= List of BanG Dream! characters =

List of characters from the BanG Dream! franchise

Artwork featuring the vocalists from eight of the bands in the franchise. From left to right: Mashiro Kurata of Morfonica, Rei Wakana/LAYER of Raise A Suilen, Ran Mitake of Afterglow, Kasumi Toyama of Poppin'Party, Tomori Takamatsu of MyGO!!!!!, Yukina Minato of Roselia, Aya Maruyama of Pastel Palettes, and Kokoro Tsurumaki of Hello, Happy World!.

The Japanese music media franchise BanG Dream! features a large ensemble of characters, with its main cast organized into twelve all-female bands of five members each. The band Poppin'Party serves as the protagonists of the franchise's anime television series, making their debut in 2015.

Four new bands were introduced with the arrival of the BanG Dream! Girls Band Party! mobile game in 2017: Roselia, Afterglow, Hello, Happy World!, and Pastel Palettes At the end of 2018, a backup band called The Third was renamed Raise A Suilen, with its members portraying new characters. A seventh band named Morfonica was introduced in 2020.

In 2022 and 2023, following a new approach being undertaken by Bushiroad, MyGO!!!!! and Ave Mujica were introduced as the eighth and ninth bands in the franchise. A tenth band, Mugendai MewType, was also introduced in 2023, consisting of five VTubers.

In 2026, two new bands, millsage and Ikka Dumb Rock!, were introduced and both made their debut in the franchise's second mobile game BanG Dream! Our Notes.

For live performances, the members of Poppin'Party, Roselia, Raise A Suilen, Morfonica, MyGO!!!!!, Ave Mujica, and Mugendai MewType play their own music, while the others are limited to vocals as well as voice acting. The live bands are the main characters in the anime while the mobile game further details their formation and activities. Various voice actresses also host band-themed online radio and television programs.

== Creation and conception ==
BanG Dream! was founded by Bushiroad president Takaaki Kidani on the premise of voice actresses who could play their own instruments in live concerts. To create the characters and setting, he approached novelist Kō Nakamura; despite having little experience creating fictional bands, two of Nakamura's works were music-based and inspired by his college friends. He shaped Poppin'Party, the first band in the franchise, and its formation after his time in high school. For example, Kasumi meeting her friends is based on Nakamura befriending classmates who wished to create a band; like Kasumi, the guitarist of Nakamura's band bought a guitar at a local pawnshop, while both groups held meetings in a warehouse. Other character aspects were based on their voice actresses, such as Tae holding street performances in the second season of the anime being inspired by Sae Ōtsuka doing the same as a teenager and Chiyu and Risa Tsumugi both being fluent in English. The character designs for Poppin'Party are also loosely modeled after their real-life counterparts. The franchise's first work, the manga BanG_Dream! Star Beat by Nakamura and Aya Ishida, contained numerous differences in character traits that were retconned in later media. The rebooted story takes place in Tokyo's Kita and Shinjuku wards.

The premiere of the anime and launch of BanG Dream! Girls Band Party! in 2017 saw the debuts of Roselia, Afterglow, Hello, Happy World!, and Pastel Palettes. Roselia had first appeared as a live-action group at Tokyo Game Show 2016. Nakamura was not involved in the game's storywriting as developer Craft Egg instead oversaw it.

The Third, a backup band that provided instrumentals for live concerts by Afterglow, Hello, Happy World!, and Pastel Palettes, debuted as its own group alongside Poppin'Party and Roselia in April 2018. The band was later renamed Raise A Suilen. Morfonica, the lone band of the seven with a violinist, was formed in 2020 to celebrate Girls Band Party!'s three-year anniversary.

Nakamura primarily writes the lyrics for Poppin'Party songs, while Elements Garden's Asuka Oda does so for the other bands.

Many of the characters are high school students, mostly split between Hanasakigawa, Haneoka, and Tsukinomori Girls' High School. As part of Girls Band Party!'s sixth anniversary, ten characters begin attending college at Yotsuba Women's University or Keiho Women's University.

== Poppin'Party ==
Logo of Poppin'Party

Poppin'Party (PoPiPa for short), the first band in the BanG Dream! franchise, serves as the protagonists of the anime series. Formed by Kasumi Toyama, the band consists of five high school friends who support her in her journey to rediscover the "Star Beat". Although their raw skill is not the best, they make up for this with their strong energy and innate connection between each other. Their name references the "popping" theme of their band and music; before performances, they huddle and recite the chant, "PoPiPa, PiPoPa, PoPiPaPaPiPoPa!".

The first season of the anime is focused on Poppin'Party's creation and efforts to perform at live house Space, while the second and third seasons detail their organization of a self-sponsored concert and participation in the BanG Dream! Girls Band Challenge, respectively. In the main story to Girls Band Party!, the band helps the player character recruit bands for the titular event. Poppin'Party has four in-game band stories: "Poppin'Party is Born!" is a retelling of their formation from the first season; "Colorful, Poppin' Candy" follows the band's plans to save the downtown festival; "Double Rainbow" focuses on an argument between Arisa and the others; and "Live Beyond!!" focuses on the band's participation in the Rocking Star Festival and desire to spread their music.

Poppin'Party is a pop rock band with upbeat music. In accordance with their goals to find the Star Beat, their outfits—which are based on school uniforms—heavily feature a celestial motif.

=== Kasumi Toyama ===
Kasumi Toyama (戸山 香澄, Toyama Kasumi) is a third-year student at Hanasakigawa Girls' High School who serves as the leader, lead singer, and rhythm guitarist of Poppin'Party. She plays a red ESP Random Star. She is active and optimistic and is always looking for a heart-pounding, sparkling sound called the "Star Beat". Her sister Asuka is a year younger than her, but it is sometimes hard to tell who is the older of the two.

She is voiced by Aimi. In the English dub, Juliet Simmons voices Kasumi.

Contrary to her happy-go-lucky nature in the finalized version, Kasumi is a shy and reserved girl in Star Beat. After being ridiculed for sensing the Star Beat and singing "Twinkle, Twinkle Little Star" as a child, she becomes withdrawn as she enters high school, but wishes to change herself by rediscovering the Star Beat. Upon finding the guitar at Arisa's pawnshop, she is recruited into becoming the protagonist of Arisa's "game" BanG_Dream! As she learns the instrument, she regains her confidence in performing.

=== Tae Hanazono ===
Nicknamed "O-tae", Tae Hanazono (花園 たえ, Hanazono Tae) is the lead guitarist of Poppin'Party and a third-year student at Hanasakigawa. A skilled guitarist who has been playing since she was little, she loves music and works part-time at a live house, the money from which she saved to buy her blue ESP Snapper guitar. A bit airheaded girl, she tends to take things at her own pace, and can be surprised and wired at times. Tae lives with her parents and 20 rabbits, whom she treats like her children.

Tae is voiced by Sae Ōtsuka. Luci Christian portrays her in the English version.

Her Star Beat counterpart is shy but strong-willed. She joins the band after assisting Kasumi, Arisa, and Rimi in writing the lyrics to their song "Yes! BanG_Dream".

=== Rimi Ushigome ===
Nicknamed "Rimi-rin" by her bandmates, Rimi Ushigome (牛込 りみ, Ushigome Rimi) is a third-year student at Hanasakigawa and the bassist of Poppin'Party, making her the youngest and shortest member of the band. She is shy, and efforts to overcome this have not resulted in success so far. Rimi plays a pink ESP Viper bass, which was a hand-me-down from her older sister Yuri Ushigome of Glitter Green. She loves the chocolate cornets from Yamabuki Bakery and chocolate (outside of mint chocolate) and sweets in general. Contrary to her meek personality, she also enjoys horror entertainment like paranormal fiction and zombie films as long as they are not excessively grotesque. Rimi grew up in the Kansai region before moving in middle school, and she occasionally speaks with a Kansai dialect when panicking.

Rimi is voiced by Rimi Nishimoto. She is voiced by Avery Smithhart in the English dub.

In Star Beat, Rimi is depicted as a mysterious girl who enjoys eating rice and pretending to be a ninja.

=== Sāya Yamabuki ===
Sāya Yamabuki (山吹 沙綾, Yamabuki Sāya) is the drummer of Poppin'Party and a third-year student at Hanasakigawa. She performs with a Pearl drum kit. A kind-hearted girl, Sāya always tries to be a good friend to Kasumi and those around her. On top of her high school studies and the band, she helps out at her family's popular business, the Yamabuki Bakery. She has a brother, Jun, and sister, Sana, who are a lot younger than her.

Sāya is voiced by Ayaka Ōhashi. Christina Kelly voices her in the English dub.

The Star Beat version of Sāya does not appear until later in the manga, though she spends the early chapters communicating with Kasumi by writing on her desk. Although she urges Kasumi to form a band with the others and helps her complete the lyrics to "Yes! BanG_Dream", she is hesitant to join.

=== Arisa Ichigaya ===
Arisa Ichigaya (市ヶ谷 有咲, Ichigaya Arisa) is the keyboardist of Poppin'Party and a third-year student at Hanasakigawa. She plays a Roland Juno-DS61 keyboard. Arisa is a very indoor girl who likes taking care of her bonsai trees and looking at stuff online. She does not go out much, but is incredibly smart and excels academically, including being the top pianist at her music school. Her sharp tongue and tsundere nature causes her and Kasumi to frequently butt heads, though she tries to keep the appearance of a rich and refined girl around others. Her grandmother runs the pawnshop Ryuseido.

Arisa is voiced by Ayasa Itō. Maggie Flecknoe voices her in the English version.

In Star Beat, Arisa is a hikikomori who plays video games. She introduces Kasumi to the Random Star at her pawnshop like in the current series, which she allows her to play on the agreement that Kasumi join her "game".

== Roselia ==
Logo of Roselia

Roselia is a Gothic rock band that is recognized at a near-professional level and has caught the eye of the music industry. Their name is a combination of "rose" and "camellia", a reference to a blue rose as it represents the band's goals of achieving the impossible. With music that also contain symphonic metal leanings, Roselia's shows are based on visual kei with elaborate costumes and impressive visuals.

In the first season of the anime, Roselia plays a minor role by performing at Space's final show. The band's presence is increased to a co-starring role in the second and third seasons as its members organize a self-sponsored show and participate in the Girls Band Challenge. In the game, their primary goal is to perform at the prestigious Future World Fes. Roselia has three band stories: "Bloom of the Blue Rose" details their creation;"Neo-Aspect" follows their efforts to rediscover their pride after a poor performance; and "Sprechchor" focuses on the band's thoughts on becoming a professional group. The first two band stories and the "Noble Rose" event story trilogy are also covered in the two-part film series Episode of Roselia.

=== Yukina Minato ===
Yukina Minato (湊 友希那, Minato Yukina) is the leader and singer of Roselia who takes everything in regards to music very seriously. She has sung for as long as she can remember, taking inspiration from her father whose burgeoning music career ended after he was forced to abandon making his own music and sell out. Although she is usually cold and stoic, she would show her softer side to people she eventually warms up to. She and Lisa have been best friends since childhood. Outside of the band, she is a first-year music student at Yotsuba after previously attending Haneoka Girls' High School. Yukina also secretly loves cats.

Aina Aiba portrays Yukina, while Olivia Swasey is her voice actress in the dub.

=== Sayo Hikawa ===
Sayo Hikawa (氷川 紗夜, Hikawa Sayo) is the guitarist of Roselia and a first-year law student at Keiho. She plays a blue ESP M-II guitar. Serious to a fault and never cuts corners, she is the older twin sister of Hina; Sayo has an inferiority complex because Hina always manages to do things perfectly without trying, while Sayo always puts her absolute effort into everything but is unable to perform as well as her. She dislikes carrots passionately as she used to eat Hina's (who disliked them as well) when they were younger, and got scolded for it because she did not eat her own. Sayo previously attended Hanasakigawa Girls' High School, where she was in the archery club and the student council's disciplinary committee.

Sayo is voiced by Haruka Kudō. Kudō and fellow Roselia member Megu Sakuragawa host the Nippon Broadcasting System program Radio Shout! Elissa Cuellar plays her in the dub.

=== Lisa Imai ===
Lisa Imai (今井 リサ, Imai Risa) is the bassist of Roselia, a first-year international studies student at Yotsuba, and Yukina's best friend and neighbor since childhood. She plays a crimson ESP BTL. She has the appearance of a gyaru, but often does things that does not suit that image and ends up hiding it. Lisa is a very compassionate person who loves taking care of others. She is very social, and has lots of friends. Lisa also loves baking cookies for others, and she is even called the mother of Roselia. Outside of the band, she works part-time in a convenience store with Moca and used to be in Haneoka's dance and tennis clubs.

Lisa was originally voiced by Yurika Endō until her retirement in May 2018, and Yuki Nakashima took over as her replacement. In the English dub, Lisa is portrayed by Nastasia Marquez.

=== Ako Udagawa ===
Ako Udagawa (宇田川 あこ, Udagawa Ako) is the drummer of Roselia and younger sister to Tomoe, whom she admires a lot and shares a passion of goth and punk fashion with. She is a second-year student at Haneoka, making her the youngest and shortest member in the band. She plays a burgundy DW double bass drum kit. She is known to often have chūnibyō tendencies, which could be the result of the time she spent playing games online. She is best friends with bandmate Rinko, whom she met through the online game Neo Fantasy Online. Outside of the band, she is classmates with Rokka and Asuka, and is also a member of her school's dance club.

She is voiced by Megu Sakuragawa, who co-hosts Radio Shout! with Kudō. Julia Traber voices Ako in the dub.

=== Rinko Shirokane ===
Rinko Shirokane (白金 燐子, Shirokane Rinko) is the keyboardist of Roselia and a first-year music student at Yotsuba. She plays a black Roland keyboard. Rinko has played the piano ever since she was young and has won various awards at piano competitions. She is extremely shy and asocial, getting easily scared when she is around large crowds or unfamiliar people. As such, she does not go out much, is easily embarrassed, and tends to be a pessimist. In her free time, she likes to read and play online games, meeting her best friend Ako in the latter; Ako also calls her "Rin-rin".

Satomi Akesaka portrayed Rinko until sensorineural hearing loss forced her to leave the band and the BanG Dream! project in September 2018. Open auditions were held to find her successor, and Kanon Shizaki took over as Rinko in November. Cynthia Martinez voices Rinko in the dub.

== Afterglow ==
Afterglow is a hard rock band that is led by Himari Uehara and was formed after Ran Mitake was placed in a different class from the others in middle school. The five live by the creed of maintaining their friendship; in accordance with keeping their status quo, they have a "rough-around-the-edges" aesthetic and their music centers on their camaraderie. The name comes from the English term for the effect on the sky following a sunset, stemming from the friends regularly watching the sunset together.

In the anime's second season, Afterglow participates in a shopping district festival with Poppin'Party, followed by the latter's self-sponsored live. The band skips the Girls Band Challenge in the third season due to scheduling conflicts. Afterglow has three band stories in Girls Band Party!: "Afterglow, The Same As Always" focuses on Ran's relationship with her father and his disapproval of the band; "Tied to the Skies" revolve around her growth and her bandmates' fears that they are being left behind; and "One of Us" follows the band entering the Melodic Rain music event.

=== Ran Mitake ===
Ran Mitake (美竹 蘭, Mitake Ran) is the lead singer and rhythm guitarist of Afterglow, and a third-year student at Haneoka Girls' High School. She plays a crimson Gibson Les Paul. Ran's family has a 100-year history as experts in ikebana flower arrangement. She is honest, strong-willed, hates losing, and gets lonely easily due to her awkward and aloof nature. Ran deeply treasures her time with her friends, and regularly says the phrase "Same as always" as a compliment of her band's performances. Although she is officially not the band's leader, she has to make decisions for them at times as Himari doesn't have a strong-enough will to do so. Due to her band's emphasis on the bonds between its members over musical skill, she considers Yukina and Roselia to be Afterglow's rivals.

Ran is voiced by Ayane Sakura. Sakura was initially skeptical of portraying Ran due to her inexperience in music, but agreed to join after being intrigued by Afterglow's premise. Courtney Lomelo voices Ran in the English dub.

=== Moca Aoba ===
Moca Aoba (青葉 モカ, Aoba Moka) is the lead guitarist of Afterglow and a third-year student at Haneoka. She plays a blue Schecter Stratocaster guitar. Moca is entirely indifferent to things she does not have interest in, but will do just about anything for her friends, especially Ran whom she's particularly close with. She loves manga and the buns from Yamabuki Bakery, and works part-time at a convenience store with Lisa. Moca has a habit of calling herself "Moca-chan" when she's feeling really confident, and regularly gives nicknames to her friends and the people around her.

She is voiced by Sachika Misawa. Misawa is a co-host of the Afterglow radio show Sunset STUDIO. Moca is voiced by Cat Thomas in the dub.

=== Himari Uehara ===
Himari Uehara (上原 ひまり, Uehara Himari) is the bassist and leader of Afterglow and a third-year student at Haneoka and a member of their tennis club. She plays a black Fender American vintage '74 jazz bass. She is a cheerful and good-natured girl and gets teased a lot by her bandmates but is not great at reading between the lines and her efforts can sometimes be fruitless. Himari is easily moved to tears when she feels touched and in many ways, relies on other members to make decisions. She also likes baking and comparing sweets from different convenience stores. Moca calls her "Hii-chan".

Emiri Katō voices Himari. Chaney Moore serves as her English voice actress.

=== Tomoe Udagawa ===
Tomoe Udagawa (宇田川 巴, Udagawa Tomoe) is the drummer of Afterglow, Ako's older sister, and a third-year student at Haneoka. She plays a Yamaha gray 3-piece drum kit. Tomoe is a candid tomboy who never badmouths others and carries no regrets. She gets along well with the adults in the shopping district, playing the taiko drums for them in local festivals. Like her younger sister Ako, she has a weak spot for fashion. Outside of the band, Tomoe works part-time at the fast food restaurant and is a member of Haneoka's dance club. Moca calls her "Tomo-chin".

Tomoe is voiced by Yoko Hikasa, and is voiced by Celeste Roberts in the dub.

=== Tsugumi Hazawa ===
Tsugumi Hazawa (羽沢 つぐみ, Hazawa Tsugumi) is the keyboardist of Afterglow and a third-year student at Haneoka where she is also the Vice President of the student council. She plays a Nord stage 88-key digital piano. Nicknamed "Tsugu" by her friends and the ordinary girl in the band. She has a positive personality, and her cheery kindness that keeps the band members' spirits high. Outside of the band, she works at her family's coffee shop, while her hobbies include stargazing and reading manga.

Hisako Kanemoto portrays Tsugumi. Alongside Sachika Misawa, Kanemoto co-hosts Sunset STUDIO. Tsugumi is voiced by Allison Sumrall in the dub version.

== Hello, Happy World! ==
Hello, Happy World! (ハロー、ハッピーワールド！, Harō, Happī Wārudo!), often shorthanded to HaroHapi (ハロハピ) was formed by Kokoro Tsurumaki in her dream of making people smile all around the world. The band is popular with children and they often perform at preschools and children's hospitals, though their music has appeal across all age ranges from swing music ("Goka! Gokai!? Phantom Thief!") to hip hop ("Worldwide Treasure!"). They are named after their sole mission to "make the world happy" through their music. Their catchphrase is "Happy, Lucky, Smile, Yay~!" ("Happy, Lucky, Smile, Hooray~!" in the localization), which is also shortened to "HLSY".

In the anime's second season, the band helps Poppin'Party with planning their self-sponsored show before participating in it themselves. In the game, Hello, Happy World! has three band stories: "Smiles To The World! Hello, Happy Union!" details their creation and helping an injured friend; "I Need You!" focuses on their plans to restore an old amusement park; and "Smile Connection!" details their trip to a foreign country.

=== Kokoro Tsurumaki ===
Kokoro Tsurumaki (弦巻 こころ, Tsurumaki Kokoro) is the leader and vocalist of the band and a third-year student at Hanasakigawa. Coming from a well-off family, Kokoro typically gets to do anything she wants, and also lives in one of the biggest houses in the area. Kokoro is extremely curious by nature and her eyes glitter whenever she encounters something new. Loves to see others smile and wishes to make the whole world smile through music. Hagumi and Kasumi call her "Kokoron". According to Misaki, she's more likely a carefree girl who does not care about anything, thus explaining her ignorance over Misaki being Michelle and her ignorance on the changes of other people; despite this, she truly cares for her bandmates. Kokoro is shown to be very acrobatic—frequently doing cartwheels and even leaping from heights—and is skilled in parkour, which makes her very popular among the underclassmen.

She is voiced by Miku Itō. Itō joined the project after expressing amusement and fascination at Hello, Happy World!'s description provided by Bushiroad; despite initial concerns about portraying Kokoro due to the demands of the character's hyperactive personality, Itō figured "not to think too deeply" when voicing her. She co-hosts the online franchise news show HaroHapi CiRCLE Broadcast with Moe Toyota. Kokoro is voiced by Natalie Rial in the dub.

=== Kaoru Seta ===
Kaoru Seta (瀬田 薫, Seta Kaoru) is the guitarist of the band, a first-year theater student at Yotsuba, and Chisato's childhood friend. A popular girl in her school's drama club, Kaoru is constantly surrounded by her fans, whom she calls "little kittens"; this is a stark contrast to her shy personality during her youth with Chisato, which she shed in middle school to become a stronger person. She enjoys reading poetry and books on philosophy and reciting lines from Shakespeare, but she does not necessarily understand what she's reading or quoting. For instance, she claims to like sachertorte and vichyssoise because they sound cool, but in reality likes common foods like miso soup. Although she is generally self-confident, she can be sensitive about others and also gets flustered whenever she meets Chisato, who often teases her about her private life.

As Kokoro believes the guitarist is the biggest face in a band, she invites Kaoru to join Hello, Happy World! despite the latter's lone experience with the instrument being an acting role as a guitarist. In the drama club, Kaoru often collaborates with members of other bands for concerts, including Roselia's Yukina and Rinko, Pastel Palettes' Chisato and Maya, and Afterglow's Tomoe and Himari. She later befriends Morfonica's Tōko after the younger student approaches her for help with adding showmanship to her performances.

Azusa Tadokoro serves as Kaoru's voice actress, while Shanae'a Moore is her dub voice actress.

=== Hagumi Kitazawa ===
Hagumi Kitazawa (北沢 はぐみ, Kitazawa Hagumi) is the bassist of the band and a third-year student at Hanasakigawa. Her family owns a meat shop, whose croquettes are a bit famous in town. An animated and happy girl with a genuine heart, who loves to call people names. She is Kasumi's classmate and childhood friend. Her lightning-fast reflexes make her an ace at softball and she is the captain of her high school team.

Hagumi is voiced by Yu-ri Yoshida, while her dub counterpart is voiced by Elizabeth Byrd.

=== Kanon Matsubara ===
Kanon Matsubara (松原 花音, Matsubara Kanon) is the drummer of the band, a first-year literature student at Keiho, and employee at the fast food restaurant with Aya. Like Rimi, she is a shy and timid, yet clumsy girl who tends to get caught up in matters she was never a part of; when overwhelmed, she has a tendency to say "fuee". However, she also tries her best to keep the band's antics down a notch. Kanon has no sense of direction, though she can easily find coffee shops by their smell. She is nicknamed "Kano-chan-senpai" by Hagumi, and is close friends and college roommates with Chisato. At Hanasakigawa, she was part of their Tea Ceremony Club.

Moe Toyota portrays Kanon. Toyota co-hosts HaroHapi CiRCLE Broadcast with Itō. Christie Guidry plays Kanon in the dub.

=== Misaki Okusawa ===
Misaki Okusawa (奥沢 美咲, Okusawa Misaki) is the DJ of the band, a third-year student at Hanasakigawa, and a member of her school's tennis club. Under the guise of a pink bear costume she used to wear for a part-time job, she goes by the stage name Michelle (ミッシェル, Misheru) while the band considers Misaki herself the band's composer and Michelle's "agent" or "friend". Misaki is tomboyish, reserved, sarcastic, tends to react poorly to her band's crazy and wild antics, and has a hard time staying positive no matter the situation. Hagumi calls her "Mii-kun". Misaki also likes making felt dolls for her little sister as a hobby.

Misaki is voiced by Tomoyo Kurosawa, while she is voiced by Shannon Emerick in the dub.

== Pastel Palettes ==
Pastel Palettes is an "idol band" formed as a gimmick by a talent agency. Though they were initially not expected to play their own instruments in live performances, they began doing so after technical errors plagued their debut. This original approach has ultimately turned them into a popular group. "Pastel Palettes" refers to the colorful and varied personalities of the band, with each member's outfit being bright and frilly and heavy use of harmonization between the five in their songs.

Pastel Palettes' anime debut comes in the second season when they join the World Idol Festival and Poppin'Party's live. The group has three band stories in the game: "Pastel Palettes, The Beginning" covers their creation and efforts to rebound from their disastrous debut; "Luminous Once More" discusses the members' dreams and goals as their activities together are hamstrung by other obligations, and "Title Idol" follows their relationship with a new idol unit formed by their talent agency.

=== Aya Maruyama ===
Aya Maruyama (丸山 彩, Maruyama Aya) is the leader and singer of Pastel Palettes and a first-year literature student at Yotsuba. An alumna of Hanasakigawa, she gets worked up easily and tends to cry a lot, though outwardly she's very cheery, high-spirited, and bubbly. She has wired skills such as knowing how to take a perfect selfie and wishes that people would recognize her when she's outside, hence why she doesn't wear her disguise in public. Outside of the band, she works part-time at the fast food store together with Kanon.

She is voiced by Ami Maeshima, who co-hosted the variety show Bandori! TV with Aimi, until her temporary departure from November 30, 2022, to September 1, 2023. Mai Le voices Aya in the dub.

=== Hina Hikawa ===
Hina Hikawa (氷川 日菜, Hikawa Hina) is the guitarist of Pastel Palettes, a first-year student at Keiho, and the younger twin sister of Sayo. She is a true genius, able to do just about anything after one single demonstration. She is a cheerful, candid individual, though she struggles to understand the feelings of other people (especially when it comes to them working hard for their dreams) and gets easily bored. Hina regularly uses weird words to describe various emotions, such as "boppin' (るん)" and "zappin' (ピピツ)".

Ari Ozawa voices Hina, while she is portrayed by Katelyn Barr in the dub.

=== Chisato Shirasagi ===
Chisato Shirasagi (白鷺 千聖, Shirasagi Chisato) is the bassist of Pastel Palettes, a first-year literature student at Yotsuba, and Kaoru's childhood friend, making her the oldest yet shortest member of the band. Having been a famous actress since she was a child, Chisato has learned to cherish her private life and the friends therein. Beneath her kind and pleasant outlook and personality, she can be quite calculating and even blunt and cold at times, especially towards Kaoru's dramatic personality. She is also close friends with Kanon, whom she met in Hanasakigawa's junior high and befriended as the latter was the first to treat her like a regular person rather than a celebrity.

Sumire Uesaka voices Chisato, while Patricia Duran voices her in the dub.

=== Maya Yamato ===
Maya Yamato (大和 麻弥, Yamato Maya) is the drummer of Pastel Palettes who is a tomboy with glasses and a first-year sociology student at Keiho. Happiest when surrounded by musical equipment, Maya is a true tech geek who becomes almost impossible to stop when talking about her beloved hobby, and completely loses track of time when she starts tinkering with all kinds of parts and equipment. She was a member of Haneoka's drama club.

Ikumi Nakagami voices Maya, while Chelsea McCurdy does so for the dub.

=== Eve Wakamiya ===
Eve Wakamiya (若宮 イヴ, Wakamiya Ivu) is the keyboardist of Pastel Palettes and a third-year student at Hanasakigawa, making her the youngest yet tallest member of the band. She is half-Japanese and half-Finnish and grew up in Finland. Eve is easygoing and kind towards everyone, loves and is fascinated by Japanese culture, and believes in the way of bushido. Outside of the band, she is a member of Hanasakigawa's flower arrangement, kendo, and tea ceremony clubs. Eve is also a part-time employee at Hazawa Coffee.

Eve is voiced by former SKE48 member Sawako Hata, while she is portrayed by Skyler Sinclair in the dub.

== Raise A Suilen ==
Wordmark of Raise A Suilen

Raise A Suilen is a group originally formed as a backup band to fill the instruments for live shows by groups whose voice actresses were unable to play music. Being the third band in the BanG Dream! universe to perform live (after Poppin'Party and Roselia), RAS was initially simply referred to as The Third (Beta) before receiving its own name and in-universe characters during their second live concert on July 17, 2018.

The band debuts in the anime's second season before becoming the focal story of the third. RAS was added to Girls Band Party! on June 10, 2020. Their first band story "Raise the Curtain" is a retelling of the anime's third season, while the second "Coruscate -DNA-" follows Chiyu's family.

=== Rei Wakana ===
Rei Wakana (和奏 レイ, Wakana Rei), who performs with the stage name LAYER (レイヤ, Reiya), is the band's lead vocalist and bassist. She is a third-year high school student and Tae's childhood friend, promising that the two would form a band together. She plays a bursting red Spector Euro LX bass.

Raychell is Rei's voice actress. Shelley Calene-Black portrays her in the dub.

=== Rokka Asahi ===
Rokka Asahi (朝日 六花, Asahi Rokka), also known as LOCK (ロック, Rokku), is the band's guitarist. She is a second-year student at Haneoka who has idolized Poppin'Party since the time she saw them perform at Space, and often meets up with the band to help with organizing their live shows. She initially played with some students from her middle school in Gifu Prefecture before moving to Tokyo, where she works in the Galaxy live house. Outside of the band, she is classmates with Ako and Asuka. She plays an aqua blue Boden J6 headless guitar.

Riko Kohara voices Rokka. Rokka is voiced by Brittney Karbowski in the dub.

=== Masuki Satō ===
Masuki Satō (佐藤 ますき, Satō Masuki), also known as MASKING (マスキング, Masukingu), is the band's drummer. She is a third-year high school student at the prestigious Shirayuki Private Academy, an all-girls' Catholic school that her mother—an alumna—encouraged her to attend. She is the daughter of Live House Galaxy's owner, who was the drummer for the band Death Galaxy. Despite her intimidating appearance, she likes cute things and baking. Nicknamed "King" by her peers, she is popular with other drummers like Ako and Maya. She plays a maple Pearl drum kit.

Masuki is voiced by Natsume. Molly Searcy portrays her in the dub.

=== Reona Nyūbara ===
Reona Nyūbara (鳰原 れおな, Nyūbara Reona), also known as PAREO (パレオ, Pareo), is the band's keyboardist. She is a third-year student at Kamogawa Chuo Junior High School in Kamogawa, Chiba. and is a fan of Pastel Palettes, regularly covering songs by the band and uploading them online; and at one point waiting in front of the stage all day during the World Idol Festival to see them perform. She plays 2 Roland keyboards.

Reona is voiced by Reo Kurachi. Kurachi and Risa Tsumugi co-host Radio R･I･O･T. Taylor Fono serves as her English voice actress.

=== Chiyu Tamade ===
Chiyu Tamade (珠手 ちゆ, Tamade Chiyu), also known as CHU2 (チュチュ, Chuchu), is the band's leader, producer, DJ, and rapper. She is a 14-year-old girl who had skipped grades to become a third-year high school student at Celosia Girls' Academy, an international school. Due to her overseas education, she is fluent in English and tends to include English words while talking. Her mother is a decorated violinist, a pedigree that Chiyu struggles to live up to until she becomes a producer.

Chiyu is voiced by Risa Tsumugi, the final member to join the band. Tsumugi hosts the RAS-themed Radio R･I･O･T program with Reo Kurachi. In the English dub, she is voiced by Hilary Haag.

== Morfonica ==
Morfonica is a symphonic rock band consisting of five second-year students at the prestigious Tsukinomori Girls' Academy. Similar to Poppin'Party, Roselia, and Raise A Suilen, Morfonica's cast members perform their own music. The band's name is a portmanteau of "morpho" and "symphonic".

Morfonica's members make their debut in Girls Band Party!'s second main story, which overlaps with their band story "Morfonica, To the Sparkling World"; their second band story "Fly with the night" concerns Rui's role in the band. The band's first anime appearance takes place in the spin-off BanG Dream! Girls Band Party! Pico: Ohmori.

The band's members host the weekly YouTube show Morfonical.

=== Mashiro Kurata ===
Mashiro Kurata (倉田ましろ, Kurata Mashiro) is the band's vocalist. New to Tsukinomori after previously attending an ordinary middle school, Mashiro is a quiet girl who finds herself overwhelmed by the successes of her peers, which she struggles with until she forms the band. While she is not the band leader, she writes lyrics for Morfonica's songs. Nicknamed "Shiro" by her bandmates, Mashiro enjoys fluffy mascots like Michelle and has a tendency to daydream. She is a close follower of Poppin'Party, which occasionally results in squabbles with Rokka regarding whom of the two is the bigger fan.

Mashiro is voiced by Amane Shindō, the youngest voice actress in the BanG Dream! franchise.

=== Tōko Kirigaya ===
Tōko Kirigaya (桐ヶ谷透子, Kirigaya Touko) is the band's guitarist. She plays a black ESP Arrow. An outgoing and friendly girl, she is popular on social media and at school, having been in the Tsukinomori education system since kindergarten. With her strong social media presence, Tōko is always eager to learn about the next biggest trend. Her family runs a kimono store, so she is knowledgeable about fashion and provides costumes for the band. She is also in her school's track and field club.

She is voiced by Hina Suguta. Suguta is a host of the Morfonica-based YouTube series Monica Radio with Yūka Nishio.

=== Nanami Hiromachi ===
Nanami Hiromachi (広町七深, Hiromachi Nanami) is the band's bassist who plays a black ESP Bottom Bump. The daughter of a sculptor and painter, Nanami is gifted but her successes cause her to be ostracized by her peers, prompting her to hope for a normal life. In spite of this, she often shows signs of her skills such as quickly learning how to arrange music. The band practices at her parents' atelier. Outside of music, Nanami enjoys collecting toys and free prizes that are packaged with snacks.

Nanami is voiced by Yūka Nishio. With Hina Suguta, Nishio hosts Monica Radio.

=== Tsukushi Futaba ===
Tsukushi Futaba (二葉つくし, Futaba Tsukushi) is the band's leader and drummer. As class president, Tsukushi aims to be a responsible leader, though she can be clumsy at times. Her father is a restaurateur who operates cafés and food trucks.

Tsukushi is voiced by Mika, who was drum instructor for Ōhashi and Sakuragawa before debuting as a voice actress.

=== Rui Yashio ===
Rui Yashio (八潮瑠唯, Yashio Rui) is the band's violinist. The best student in her class and a student council member, Rui is a polite girl with a realistic but blunt attitude. She plays a black five-string violin.

She is voiced by Ayasa.

== MyGO!!!!! ==
MyGO!!!!! is an alternative rock band whose members attend different schools. Three of the band's members were formerly part of Crychic (stylized in all caps) until its dissolution.

The band name is a play on the word "迷子" (maigo), meaning "Lost Children" in Japanese, in reflection of their individual lack of direction. Five exclamation marks are suffixed to represent each band member.

=== Tomori Takamatsu ===
Tomori Takamatsu (高松 燈, Takamatsu Tomori) is the vocalist and lyricist of the band. A first-year student in Haneoka Girls' High School, Tomori has long struggled with making friends due to the fact she feels she belonged to nowhere. She has an awkward personality, infamously known as "Haneoka's Weirdo Girl" for this reason, as she likes collecting all sorts of things such as band-aids, slippery things, just-the-right-size things, and even rocks and fallen leaves that she picks up from the ground. She is a member of Haneoka's astronomy club.

Tomori is voiced by Hina Yōmiya.

=== Anon Chihaya ===
Anon Chihaya (千早 愛音, Chihaya Anon) is the rhythm guitarist and leader of the band. A first-year student in Haneoka Girls' High School, she was popular in her middle school as their student council president and used to study in England after graduating, only to end up falling behind her peers and as a result returned to Japan in secret. She is a social girl, and has been able to gather respect from people around her; in spite of her popularity, Anon has struggled to make friends with them. She plays a see-through sea green ESP Ultratone.

Anon is voiced by Rin Tateishi, in her first voice acting role.

=== Rāna Kaname ===
Rāna Kaname (要 楽奈, Kaname Rāna) is the lead guitarist of the band, making her the youngest and shortest member of the band. A third year in Hanasakigawa Girls' Junior High School, she is a very talented guitarist who also has a very frank personality and heterochromia, as she always states what she likes and does not like. She is somewhat of a glutton and loves sweets, especially parfaits, but also dislikes hot foods as she has a sensitive tongue. She plays a distressed see-through wine red ESP Potbelly.

Rāna is voiced by Hina Aoki.

=== Soyo Nagasaki ===
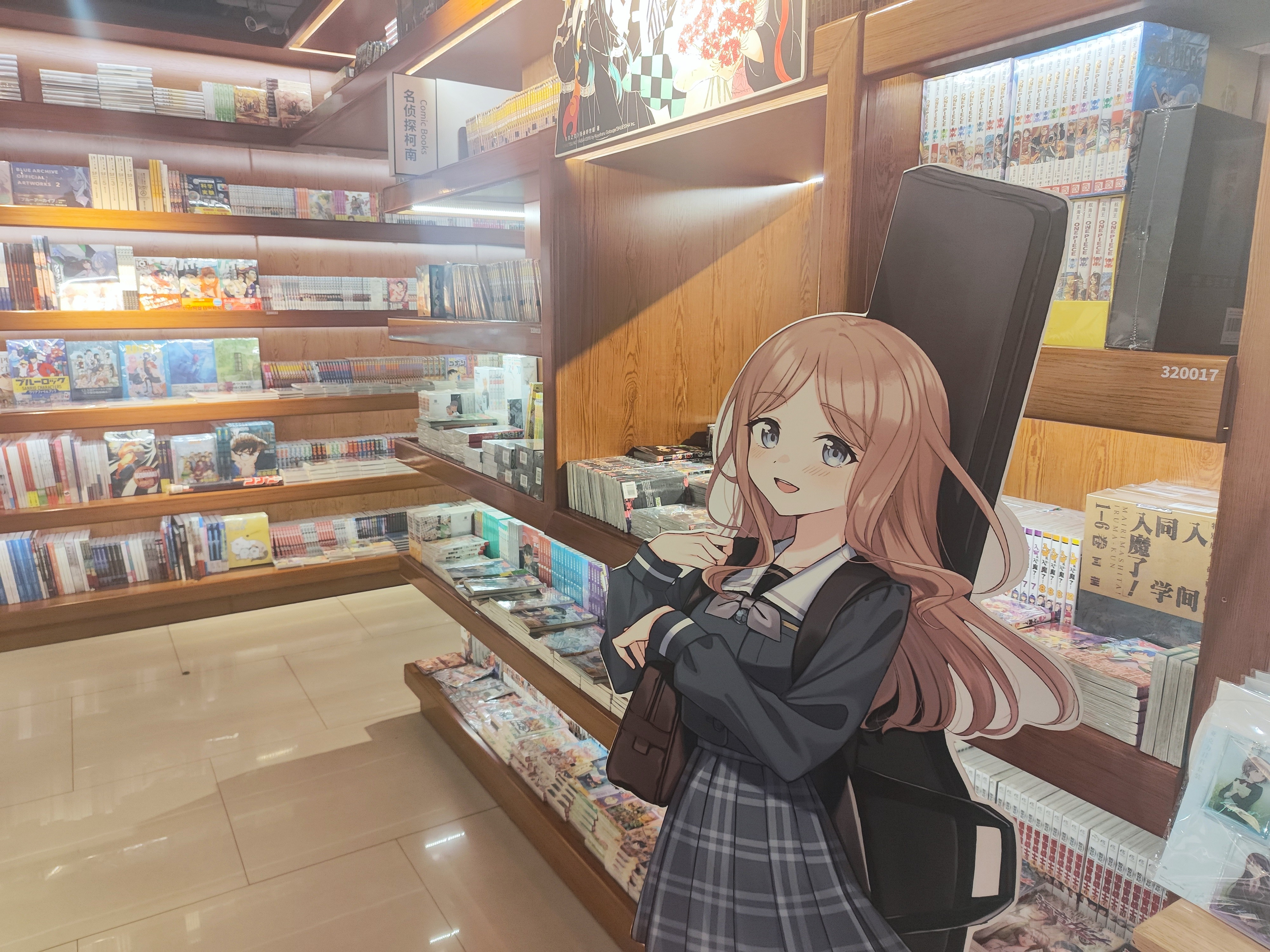
Cardboard cutout of Soyo at a bookstore in Xiamen

Soyo Nagasaki (長崎 そよ, Nagasaki Soyo) is the bassist of the band. She is also the oldest and tallest member. A first year from Tsukinomori Girls' Academy, she is in charge of the contrabass at her school's brass band. She has a calm and caring personality, which makes her reliable for many peers in her school, thus elevating her to the status of an older sister for some. She plays a sunburst ESP GB.

Soyo is voiced by Mika Kohinata, in her first voice acting role.

=== Taki Shiina ===
Taki Shiina (椎名 立希, Shiina Taki) is the drummer of the band. A first year from Hanasakigawa Girls' High School, Taki has a brash and harsh personality towards outsiders, resulting in her struggle to make friends. This behavior and look ultimately follows Taki when she works at RiNG as a junior to Sāya, which also prevents her from having good customer service. She has an older sister named Maki, who attended Haneoka; according to Soyo, Maki used to be the president of the school's brass band and is a member of the local orchestra which frequently participated in and won competitions. This compelled Taki to transfer to Hanasakigawa from Haneoka's Girls' High School's middle school branch, not wanting to be overshadowed by the accomplishments of her older sister.

She is voiced by Coco Hayashi.

== Ave Mujica ==
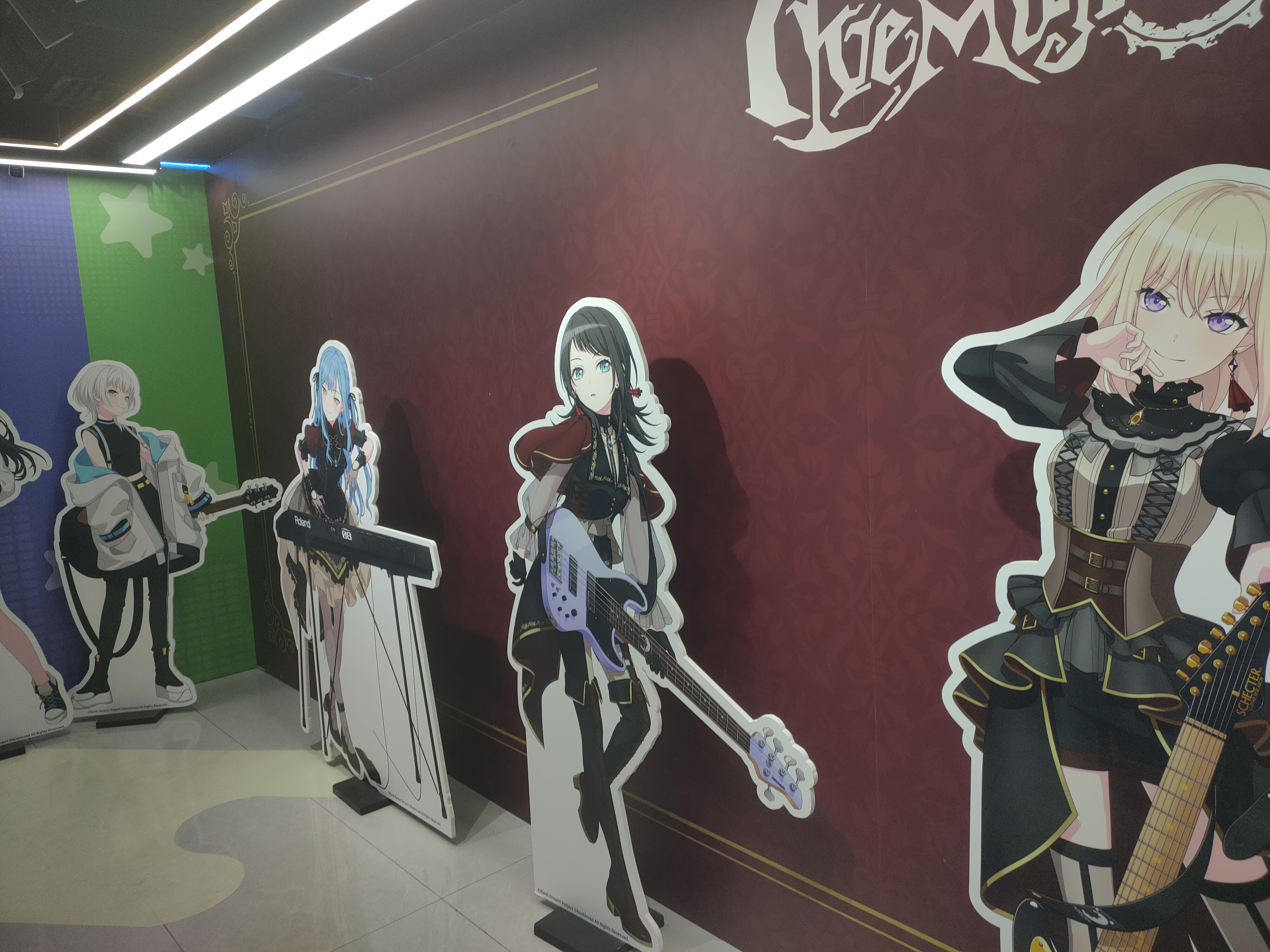
Cardboard stands of Rāna (far left), Sakiko, Umiri, and Uika at a pop-up retail store on Nanjing Road

Ave Mujica is a horror-themed, visual kei, metal band consisting of five members. Two of the band's members were formerly part of Crychic until its dissolution. Ave Mujica's band members were unknown and hid their faces while performing. During Ave Mujica 0th LIVE, they also wore cloaks until the last song. Their identities were later revealed in Episode 13 of BanG Dream! It's MyGO!!!!!.

=== Uika Misumi ===
Uika Misumi (三角 初華, Misumi Uika), also known as Doloris (ドロリス, Dororisu) after the lunar mare Lacus Doloris, is the lead vocalist, lead guitarist, and lyricist of the band as well as one of the members of pop duo sumimi, the other being Mana Sumita. She is a first-year student at Hanasakigawa Girls' High School, a classmate of Taki and Umiri, who has a bright personality and loves stargazing. She is also Sakiko's childhood friend, whom she met at the Togawa family's countryside estate. She plays a Schecter seven-string guitar.

She is voiced by Rico Sasaki.

=== Mutsumi Wakaba ===
Mutsumi Wakaba (若葉 睦, Wakaba Mutsumi), also known as Mortis (モーティス, Mōtisu) after the lunar mare Lacus Mortis, is the rhythm guitarist of the band. She is a first-year student in Tsukinomori Girls' Academy and another childhood friend of Sakiko, with a quiet, stoic personality. Her father is a famous comedian called Wakaba, and her mother is Mori Minami, an actress. Because of her famous parents, Mutsumi developed an inferiority complex and started playing the guitar to find something that she alone was good at. Like Uika, Mutsumi also plays a Schecter seven-string guitar.

She is voiced by Yuzuki Watase.

=== Umiri Yahata ===
Umiri Yahata (八幡 海鈴, Yahata Umiri), also known as Timoris (ティモリス, Timorisu) after the lunar mare Lacus Timoris, is the bassist of the band. She is a first-year student at Hanasakigawa Girls' High School, a classmate of Taki and Uika, and a very straightforward person despite her stoic appearance, although she can demonstrate her dry humor, as well as buying snacks or drinks for Taki. She plays a Schecter ExBass, but unlike all the other bassists, she plays a 5-string bass.

She is voiced by Mei Okada.

=== Nyamu Yūtenji ===
Nyamu Yūtenji (祐天寺 にゃむ, Yūtenji Nyamu), also known as Amoris (アモーリス, Amōrisu) after the lunar mare Sinus Amoris, is the drummer of the band. Nyamu is an up-and-coming beauty influencer from Fukuoka who hides her natural Hakata dialect and goes under the online name "Nyamuchi" (にゃむち).

She is voiced by Akane Yonezawa, in her first voice acting role.

=== Sakiko Togawa ===
Sakiko Togawa (豊川 祥子, Togawa Sakiko), also known as Oblivionis (オブリビオニス, Oburibionisu) after the lunar mare Lacus Oblivionis, is the keyboardist, composer, leader, and founder of the band. She is a first-year student in Haneoka Girls' High School and a talented pianist since youth. She has an outwardly harsh personality, stemming from her difficult family situation, as they were affluent before the passing of Sakiko's mother during her middle school years. Her father went into bankruptcy after he took responsibility for a fraud case with a loss of ¥16.8 billion (US$106.12 million) at his father-in-law's conglomerate, the Togawa Group, leading to him being disowned and becoming an alcoholic, prompting Sakiko to take care of him instead of staying with her grandfather.

She is voiced by Kanon Takao.

== Mugendai MewType ==
Mugendai MewType (夢限大 みゅーたいぷ, Mugendai Myūtaipu; lit. My Tape's Dream Limit) also known as "Yumemita" is an all-girl virtual band. The band consists of five female VTubers. Unlike all the other bands in the franchise, it is the only band to lack a bassist and drummer. Uniquely, the band members are also heavily involved in the production of their music. Mugendai MewType's members initially obscured their faces during live concerts and photos until their 4th live, when they fully revealed their faces. Outside of normal band activities, the members also livestream and conduct VTuber activities individually and as a group.

Within the BanG Dream! universe and in the anime television series BanG Dream! Yume∞mita, all of Mugendai MewType's members attend Kanda Shiroyama Academy and have prior established careers as Internet influencers.

=== Arale Nakamachi ===
Arale Nakamachi (仲町 あられ, Nakamachi Arare) is the band's leader and vocalist. She mainly does singing and chatting livestreams. In the BanG Dream! universe, Arale had a past as a former member of La La La La Girls with Ritsu and Viola, though the band fell apart following a scandal that maliciously depicted Arale as a problematic member. In its aftermath, Arale became socially awkward and cautious of her actions while remaining wary of Viola's schemes.

=== Nonoka Miyanaga ===
Nonoka Miyanaga (宮永 ののか, Miyanaga Nonoka) is the band's lead guitarist. She plays a pink ESP Throbber. Nonoka does a variety of streaming including gaming, playing guitar, and other activities. Prior to BanG! Dream, she had no experience with guitar. In the BanG Dream! universe, Nonoka is also an Internet celebrity who played songs on her guitar to a wide audience as a child.

=== Ritsu Minetsuki ===
Ritsu Minetsuki (峰月 律, Minetsuki Ritsu) is the band's rhythm guitarist. She plays a blue ESP Stream GT. Similarly to Nonoka, Ritsu also had no experience playing guitar prior to her debut. She also streams a variety of activities including playing guitar and mukbang streams. In the BanG Dream! universe, Ritsu was also a former member of La La La La Girls with Arale and Viola, and was forced to remain with Viola when they later formed Fairy Bouquet.

=== Miyako Fuji ===
Miyako Fuji (藤 都子, Fuji Miyako) is the band's keyboardist. She does a majority of the band's official art and her streams mainly revolve around drawing live and practicing keyboard. In the BanG Dream! universe, Miyako works as the author and illustrator of her own manga, having no opportunity to rest and becoming constantly exhausted during band practice.

=== Yuno Sengoku ===
Yuno Sengoku (千石ユノ, Sengoku Yuno) is the band's DJ and manipulator. She assists in producing some of the band's songs and mainly does karaoke and gaming streams. On December 27, 2024, she kickstarted a solo career as a music producer with the release of "YoU kNOw the overture" featuring Japanese vocalist Nanahira. In the BanG Dream! universe, Yuno had prior experience being in a band with her middle school band Supremacy, which dissolved after each of its members went their separate ways.

== Millsage ==
Millsage is one of two bands which debuted in BanG Dream! Our Notes. They are the first band in the franchise to have their vocalist playing an instrument that is not a stringed instrument. Hotaru's voice actor was revealed during the announcement of Our Notes while the other members' voice actors were accidentally leaked on Our Notes' website, before being officially revealed in their detailed profiles posted on X.

=== Hotaru Shiomi ===
Hotaru Shiomi (汐見 蛍, Shiomi Hotaru) is the band's singer and keyboardist. A third-year middle school student at Geijutsu Academy, she has a highly sensitive personality, with somewhat of a naive side. She is also an apprentice of Kanata Sawami, the previous keyboardist and leader of the band. She plays a Roland GP609.

She is voiced by Ria Yakushiji, in her first major role.

=== Natsume Izawa ===
Natsume Izawa (伊沢 なつめ, Izawa Natsume) is the band's lead guitarist and composer. A second-year student at Minase Girls' Academy, she is overconfident and extremely prideful, tending to be confrontational and assert dominance over people she doesn't deem worthy. She plays an Ibanez RG8570.

She is voiced by Chiharu, the sister of Aimi, Kasumi's voice actor.

=== Nagi Kotohira ===
Nagi Kotohira (琴平 凪, Kotohira Nagi) is the band's rhythm guitarist. A first-year student at Minase Girls' Academy and a classmate of Houka, as well as Mahoro and Kanata's childhood friend, she has a calm and composed presence with a relaxed manner and refined way of speaking, making her seem more mature than her actual age. She plays a PRS Custom 24.

She is voiced by Asaki Yuikawa.

=== Mahoro Hamasaki ===
Mahoro Hamasaki (浜崎 まほろ, Hamasaki Mahoro) is the band's bassist, current leader and lyricist. A second-year student at Minase Girls' Academy, as well as Nagi and Kanata's childhood friend, she is friendly and easygoing with a natural way of getting along with everyone. She plays an Ibanez BTB1835.

She is voiced by Yurie Igoma.

=== Houka Izumi ===
Houka Izumi (和泉 朋花, Izumi Houka) is the band's drummer. A first-year student at Minase Girls' Academy and a classmate of Nagi, she is a popular presence in her class with a strong fascination for overwhelming talent. She claims to love geniuses. She uses a Tama Starclassic drumkit.

She is voiced by Hinano Sakikawa.

== Ikka Dumb Rock! ==
Ikka Dumb Rock! is one of two bands which debuted in BanG Dream! Our Notes. Their name is a pun on "ikkadanran" (一家団欒; lit. happy family get-together). They are currently the only band in the franchise with dual vocalists. (Note: Epsilon Phi, a band from From Argonavis when the project was still part of the BanG Dream! franchise, also has two vocalists.) Raika and Miku's voice actors were revealed during the announcement of Our Notes while the other members' voice actors were accidentally leaked on Our Notes' website, before being officially revealed on their detailed profiles posted on X.

=== Raika Suga ===
Raika Suga (須賀 蕾叶, Suga Raika) is the lead guitarist and first singer. A second year student at Hanasakigawa Girls' High School, she is an energetic and outward girl who is stubborn and resolute at accomplishing a given goal, though she remains respectful and mindful of others. She plays a Fender Telecaster.

She is voiced by May Tachibana.

=== Miku Mahashi ===
Miku Mahashi (馬橋 心玖, Mahashi Miku) is the rhythm guitarist and second singer. A second year student at Haneoka Girls' High School, she has a practical and levelheaded way of thinking through a situation. She has a preference of not revealing enough information about herself to others while not peering into another person's private life. She plays a red Fender Stratocaster.

She is voiced by Sakura Suzumi.

=== Yomogi Yakura ===
Yomogi Yakura (矢倉 蓬咲, Yakura Yomogi) is the band's bassist. She is a first year university student at Shinō Women's University, but is currently taking a leave of absence. She suffers from severe stage fright and is nervous in talking to others, though she remains determined to improve her social skills by taking inspiration from the delinquent manga she frequently reads and admires. She plays a white Fender Jazz Bass.

She is voiced by Niina Hanamiya.

=== Chieri Umezato ===
Chieri Umezato (梅里 ちえり, Umezato Chieri) is the band's drummer. A first year student at Haneoka Girls' High School, she is boisterous and prideful, craving attention from others and wanting to enlist them to her own group called the "Chieri Union". She does not get discouraged from her missteps and continues to remain focused on her goals. She uses a Pearl Masters Maple drumkit with Sabian Cymbals.

She is voiced by Hana Hishikawa.

=== Shizuku Shinomiya ===
Shizuku Shinomiya (四宮 寧月, Shinomiya Shizuku) is the band's keyboardist. She is currently the youngest character in the franchise, being a second year middle school student at Tsukinomori Girls' Academy. She carries a calm demeanor and speaks in an antiquated manner, emphasizing her growing up in a privileged household. She plays a Roland FANTOM-06 Synthesizer Keyboard.

She is voiced by Hikaru Tono.

== Other characters ==
Shifune Tsuzuki (都築 詩船, Tsuzuki Shifune)
Voiced by: Mami Koyama
The owner of the live house Space (branded as SPACE) where the band Glitter Green often performs at. Simply referred to as "Owner" by her employees and participating bands, she is quite strict and has a no-nonsense personality. She was a guitarist in a popular rock band called Miraculous Scarlet, and opened Space to disprove the generalization that music venues are intimidating. Shifune eventually closes Space, but remains involved with the other live houses as an advisor and watching over her granddaughter Rāna. She later helps the live houses organize the BanG Dream! Girls Band Challenge.
Asuka Toyama (戸山 明日香, Toyama Asuka)
Voiced by: Yuka Ozaki (Japanese); Kira Vincent-Davis (English)
Kasumi's younger sister and a student at Haneoka. Called "A-chan" by Kasumi, she was a member of Hanasakigawa's swim club in junior high before transferring to Haneoka to prepare for college. At Haneoka, she becomes close friends with Rokka and Ako. She later helps Marina organize the finals for the Girls Band Challenge, which includes conducting interviews with the participating bands. Her voice actress Yuka Ozaki formerly co-hosted Bandori! TV with Aimi before Ami Maeshima took over.
Marina Tsukishima (月島 まりな, Tsukishima Marina)
Voiced by: Aya Suzaki
A staff member at the live house CiRCLE and the main non-player character in the game BanG Dream! Girls Band Party!, where she tries to get five bands together for a multi-live event together with the player's help. Prior to working at CiRCLE, she was the guitarist in an all-girl band that sought to go professional, but broke up after realizing they were not having fun during their performances. In response to her band's failure, she joined CiRCLE to help raise awareness for other groups striving for success. She is a main character in the Girls Band Party! Pico spin-off anime, while she helps organize the Girls Band Challenge in the third season.

=== CHiSPA ===
CHiSPA is the band that Sāya was a member of in middle school. Like Poppin'Party, CHiSPA auditioned to play at Space and succeeded; for the live house's final concert, CHiSPA was the last band to perform before PoPiPa. CHiSPA's song "Be shine, shining!" appears in the first season of the anime as an insert song.

Natsuki Umino (海野 夏希, Umino Natsuki)
Voiced by: Misato Fukuen
Natsuki is a third-year student at Hanasakigawa. She is the vocalist and lead guitarist and is friends with Sāya.
Satomi Taiko (大湖 里実, Taiko Satomi)
Voiced by: Saki Minami
Satomi is a third-year high school student at Hanasakigawa. She becomes CHiSPA's drummer after Sāya's departure, and other members call her "Sato-chan". She is "quiet but her performance is flashy."
Fumika Mori (森 文華, Mori Fumika)
Voiced by: Madoka Asahina
Fumika is the bassist of CHiSPA. She is a third-year high school student at a nearby high school.
Mayu Kawabata (川端 真結, Kawabata Mayu)
Voiced by: Rina Honnizumi
Mayu is the keyboardist of CHiSPA. She is a third-year student at Fumika's school.

=== Glitter Green ===
Glitter Green (stylized Glitter☆Green) is a four-person band consisting of students from Hanasakigawa. Led by Rimi's older sister Yuri Ushigome, the band primarily performed at Space until its closure and the members' graduation. Prior to leaving high school, the four were part of the student council.

The members' voice actresses have starred together in the Bushiroad franchise Tantei Opera Milky Holmes. Their lone single "Don't be afraid!", which was used as an insert song during the first season, was released in collaboration with Milky Holmes on November 21, 2018. A second song "Glee! Glee! Glee!" also appears in the season.

In the English dub of the second season, Kara Greenberg voices much of the band, with the exception of Hinako, who is portrayed by Melissa Molano.

Yuri Ushigome (牛込 ゆり, Ushigome Yuri)
Voiced by: Suzuko Mimori (Japanese); Kara Greenberg (English)
The lead vocalist, guitarist, and leader of Glitter Green and the older sister of Rimi Ushigome. Yuri has a mature and caring personality, and was a member of Hanasakigawa's Swim Club. After graduating high school, she begins attending a college overseas but remains in contact with Rimi via text.
Hinako Nijikki (二十騎 ひなこ, Nijikki Hinako)
Voiced by: Sora Tokui (Japanese); Melissa Molano (English)
The drummer of Glitter Green. She is an energetic girl who likes to be physically affectionate, hugging and petting those she is friends with. Hinako also works with Rii at Edogawa Music, though her hyperactive personality regularly annoys Rii; in response, Rii orders her to remain quiet during the band's concerts to avoid raising a commotion.
Rii Uzawa (鵜沢 リィ, Uzawa Rii)
Voiced by: Izumi Kitta (Japanese); Kara Greenberg (English)
The bassist of Glitter Green. Outside of the band, she works as a salesperson at Edogawa Music with Hinako. Rii carries a plush demon named "Debeko" that she occasionally uses to communicate with others.
Nanana Wanibe (鰐部七菜, Wanibe Nanana)
Voiced by: Mikoi Sasaki (Japanese); Kara Greenberg (English)
The keyboardist of Glitter Green and the student council president before graduating. She connects with her fellow Hanasakigawa keyboardists by interacting with Arisa, including practicing and eating at ramen shops together, and being partly responsible for Rinko succeeding her as student council president.

=== Sumimi ===
Sumimi (stylized in lowercase) is an idol unit consisting of Uika Misumi and Sumita Mana.

Mana Sumita (純田 まな, Sumita Mana)
Voiced by: Hazuki Tanda
Mana is the vocalist of the idol unit sumimi. She enjoys donuts and often shares them with Uika.

=== Fairy Bouquet ===
Fairy Bouquet (フェアリィ・ブゥケ, Fearī Būke) is a band that appeared in BanG Dream! Yume∞mita. Within the story, it was the former band of Ritsu before joining Mugendai MewType.

Viola (ビオラ, Biora)
Voiced by: Kaede Hondo
The leader of Fairy Bouquet. She was a former bandmate of Arale and Ritsu in a band named La La La La Girls. Cunning and manipulative, she exerts effort in ruining Arale's career in Mugendai MewType by spreading rumors and faked videos and manipulating her bandmates Ritsu and Miyako.
Bell (ベル, Beru)
Voiced by: Wakana Maruoka
A member of Fairy Bouquet.
Popo (ポポ)
Voiced by: Yui Tsukada
A member of Fairy Bouquet.
