= Roland Juno =

Synthesizer

- Manufacturer: Roland
- Dates: 1982 - present

Technical specifications
- Synthesis type: digital synthesizer

Input/output

The Juno is a line of polyphonic synthesizers produced by Roland Corporation since 1982. They are typically lower cost than the flagship synthesizers, but nonetheless the sounds of some Juno synthesizers have been very influential.

Roland Juno models
Model name	Year	Synth engine	Price on release	Reference
Juno-6	1982	DCO+Filter, 6 voices	£699	
Juno-60	1982	DCO+Filter, 6 voices, memory and DCB connection	£1199	
Juno-106	1984	DCO+Filter, 6 voices, MIDI	£799	
Alpha Juno	1986	DCO+Filter, 6 voices, MIDI	£575–£779	
Juno-D	2005	PCM	£399	
Juno-G	2006	PCM with SRX expansion board	£799	
Juno-Di	2009	PCM		
Juno-Gi	2010	PCM, digital multitrack recorder		
Juno-DS	2015	PCM, Axial wave expansion slot	£549	
Juno-X	2022	ZEN-core	£1689	
Juno-D	2025	ZEN-core	£699	
