= Timoris =

Timoris may refer to:

- Lacus Timoris, a lunar mare
- Timoris, the stage name of Umiri Yahata, a fictional character from BanG Dream!
