= Roland Juno-60 =

Synthesizer

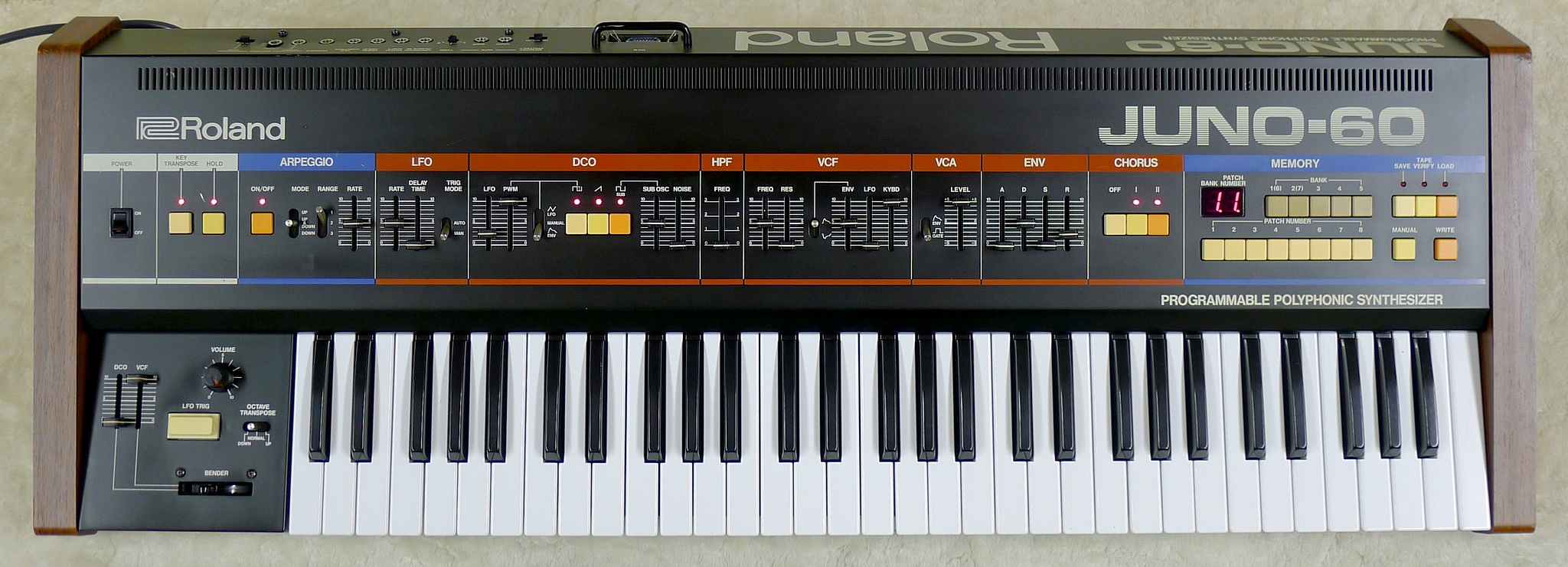
- Roland Juno-60
- Manufacturer: Roland
- Dates: 1982–1984
- Price: US$1,795; UK£1,199; JP¥238,000

Technical specifications
- Polyphony: 6 voices
- Timbrality: Monotimbral
- Oscillator: 1 DCO + Sub osc per voice (pulse, saw, square)
- LFO: triangle
- Synthesis type: Analog Subtractive
- Filter: Analog 24dB/oct resonant low-pass, non-resonant high-pass
- Attenuator: 1 ADSR envelope generator
- Aftertouch expression: No
- Velocity expression: No
- Storage memory: 56 patches
- Effects: Chorus

Input/output
- Keyboard: 61 keys
- External control: DCB

The Roland Juno-60 is an analog synthesizer manufactured by the Roland Corporation between 1982 and 1984. It followed the Juno-6, an almost identical synthesizer released months earlier. The Juno synthesizers introduced Roland's digitally controlled oscillators, allowing for greatly improved tuning stability over its competitors.

The Juno-6 and Juno-60 were introduced as low-cost alternatives to polyphonic synths such as the Sequential Circuits Prophet-5 and Roland's own Jupiter-8. Its built-in chorus effect was designed to make up for the weaker sound of its single oscillator, and it went on to become its signature effect. The Juno-60 had an immediate impact in 1980s pop music, being used on hits such as "Take On Me" by a-ha, "A Different Corner" by George Michael, and "Time After Time" by Cyndi Lauper.

The Juno-60 continued to be popular in the 1990s, being used by house and techno artists. It experienced a resurgence in the 2000s and beyond, gaining popularity amongst modern pop, indie and synthwave artists. It has inspired numerous software emulations.

== Development ==
We used a one-oscillator design for the JUNO series to reduce its price, but its sound naturally ended up being thinner than say the JUPITER-8 or JX-3P, which used two oscillators. So our main priority in developing the JUNO series was to produce thick and dense sounds with just one oscillator. To this end, we employed a variety of strategies, such as adding a chorus function and boosting the lows when the high-pass filter was not being applied. So the flat setting is actually just one increment up from zero on the high-pass filter.

— Hideki Izuchi, engineer at Roland Corporation

The late 1970s and 1980s saw the introduction of the first digital synthesizers, such as the Fairlight CMI and Synclavier. Roland president Ikutaro Kakehashi recognized that the synthesizer market was moving away from analog synthesis, but Roland had no commercially viable digital technology. He approached American engineer John Chowning about his recently developed means of FM synthesis, but Yamaha had already secured exclusive rights.

Prior to the release of the Juno-6, polyphonic synthesizers were expensive and subject to tuning issues caused by the components in synthesizers' oscillator circuits being sensitive to temperature. At the time, Roland's flagship synthesizer was the Jupiter-8, released in 1981, which cost $5,000 (equivalent to nearly $18,000 in 2024). With the Juno range, Roland aimed to create a polyphonic synthesizer that was less expensive than competitors, whilst also improving tuning reliability.

== Release ==
Roland released the Juno-6 in May 1982 with a list price of US$1295. It used mostly traditional analog technology, with a voltage-controlled filter, voltage-controlled amplifier, low-frequency oscillator and ADSR envelope generators. However, it also used digitally controlled oscillators (DCOs), analog oscillators controlled by digital circuits. As opposed to the voltage-controlled oscillators of previous synthesizers, which frequently went out of tune, the DCOs ensured tuning stability. According to Sound on Sound, "The Juno-6 was the first analog polysynth that you could carry onto a stage, switch on, and play with complete confidence that the instrument would be in tune." It also included performance controls, an arpeggiator, and an ensemble effect.

Roland released another version, the Juno-60, in September 1982, which added patch memory (allowing users to save and recall up to 54 sounds) and a DCB connector, a precursor to MIDI.

Production of the Juno-60 ended in February 1984, when Roland released the Juno-106.

== Sounds and features ==
Juno-60 Envelope PWM strings
An example of the Juno-60's unique ability to assign its PWM to the envelope generator, creating a rich "swell" effect. Not possible on the Juno-106, or most synthesizers in general.

Juno-60 Resonance sweep
Creating a "cat's meow" effect with the IR3109 resonance assigned to the envelope, very difficult for most software or digital emulations to get right due to the complexities of analog resonance.

Juno-60 Manual PWM
Manually controlling the PWM while playing chords on the Juno-60.

Juno-60 and Jupiter-4
A Juno-60 playing a lead alongside a Jupiter-4 for the random arpeggio. No external effects only onboard chorus for both.

The Roland Juno-6 and Juno-60 are single-oscillator analog synthesizers, featuring a high-pass filter, a low-pass filter, a single ADSR envelope and a single LFO.

Many polyphonic synthesizers contained two oscillators, so to make up for the single oscillator, Roland implemented an onboard chorus effect as well as a high-pass filter that would boost the bass level in its lowest position. The chorus effect is engaged using two push buttons which give slow modulation rates of 0.4 Hz and 0.6 Hz. Additionally, the two buttons can be engaged simultaneously to create an even stronger chorus effect. Although regarded as noisy, the Juno chorus effect is considered a signature feature of the Juno-60. It was based around bucket brigade designs from the 1970s, such as those in the Roland DC-50 "Digital Chorus" effect unit from 1976, and uses two identical circuits incorporating two ICs (MN3009 and MN3101).

== Impact ==
The Juno-60 was widely used in 1980s pop, house, 1990s techno music, and even today by acts including Enya, Vince Clarke, Howard Jones, Nik Kershaw, John Foxx, a-ha, Billy Idol, Fingers Inc., Berlin, Eurythmics, A Flock of Seagulls, Cyndi Lauper and Wham!. It was also a key instrument in Chicago house. The 2010s saw a resurgence of popularity among indie and electro acts such as Metronomy, driving up the price on the used market.

== Successors ==
Roland followed up the Juno-60 with the Roland Juno-106 in 1984. The Juno-106 featured MIDI, had patch storage of 128 sounds, replaced the arpeggiator with a portamento effect, and introduced Roland's now-standard left/right/push performance lever for pitch-bend and modulation.

The Alpha Juno 1 and Alpha Juno 2 were released in 1985. These synths offered new programming capabilities, backlit screens and a new interface. The Juno 2 also featured a velocity‑ and aftertouch‑sensitive keyboard as well as a cartridge slot for storing patches. They were seen as too expensive and difficult to program, so were a commercial failure, ceasing production in 1986.

Roland revived the Juno name in the 00s, releasing the Juno-D in 2004, the Juno-G in 2006, the Juno-Stage in 2008, the Juno-Di in 2009 and the Juno-Gi 2010. Despite the name, these synths had nothing in common with the Juno or Alpha Juno synths, with Roland instead using the name Juno to denote 'affordable' synthesizers.

In 2015, Roland released the JU-06 as part of their Boutique range. The JU-06 is a 4-voice version of the Juno-106, using Roland's digital Analog Circuit Behaviour (ACB) technology. An updated version, the JU-06A, was released in 2019, which is a Juno-60 switchable to Juno-106. It features the continuous high-pass filter of the 106, the envelope-controllable pulse-width-modulation of the 60, and the filter of both switchable from the front panel.

Roland released the Juno-X in 2022, a modern synth featuring digital emulations of the Juno-60 and Juno-106 as well as an additional Juno-X model that features a supersaw waveform, velocity sensitivity and an Alpha-Juno style pitch envelope control.

== Software emulations ==
Due to its popularity and coveted sound, the Roland Juno 60 has inspired several software plugin emulations of both the synthesizer engine and chorus effect.

- TAL U-NO-62 by Togu Audio Line, a Juno-60 emulation released in 2007.
- TAL U-NO-LX, released in 2012 as a fully rewritten replacement for TAL U-NO-62.
- Arturia Jun-6 V, an emulation of the Juno-6 was released in 2020.
- Roland released a software emulation of the Juno-60 in 2021 as part of their Roland Cloud subscription, which can be used with Roland's PLUG-OUT format.
- JUNE by AudioThing, a JUNO-60 Emulation Plugin released in 2025.

Software emulations of the Juno chorus effect include:

- TAL Chorus-60 (2007)
- TAL Chorus-LX (2012)
- Arturia Chorus JUN-6 (2020)
- Roland JUNO-60 Chorus (2022)
