= East of Eden (Japanese band) =

Japanese all-female rock band

- Origin: Japan
- Genres: Symphonic rock; Heavy metal; Heavy metal; Power metal
- Years active: 2023–present
- Labels: Victor; JPU; Warner Japan
- Members: Ayasa; Akane Minato; Yuki; Mina Yamauchi; Mizuki
- Past members: Wakazaemon
- Website: fan.pia.jp/east_of_eden_official/

East of Eden is a Japanese symphonic rock-/metal band formed in August 2023.

== History ==
The formation of East of Eden was announced on August 8, 2023 with violinist and Morfonica member Ayasa as a founding member. Akane Minato who was a member of the idol group predia was announced as the group's vocalist. Yuki, who is also a member of the instrumental rock group D Drive, became the guitarist of the band. Mizuki, a founding member of Lonesome blue, started out as a session drummer in East of Eden. Until December 2024, Wakazaemon was the band's bassist. Wakazaemon was also a member of Corona Namore Momo, a franchising band of Maximum the Hormone. She was replaced by Mina Yamauchi, who was a former member of Japanese pop/rock group Girlfriend.

The same day the band was announced, their debut single Evolve was released digitally as music download and for music streaming alongside an official music video. In October 2023, the band sold-out their debut concert at Zepp DiverCity in Tokyo. On December 20, 2023, East of Eden released their debut EP entitled Forbidden Fruit -1st Piece via Victor Entertainment which managed to peak at no. 34 in the official Japanese Albums Chart published by Oricon. The EP was released internationally via British music label JPU Records on February 2, 2024. In May 2024, East of Eden performed at Metrock Festival in Tokyo before releasing their second EP Forbidden Fruit -2nd Piece- in July the same year. On the day of the EP release the group also published a music video for their song Cross∞Roads.

After signing to Warner Music Japan, East of Eden released their debut album The First Eden -Seeds of Hope on March 12, 2025. Between March 15–20, 2025 East of Eden played four concerts in Zepp Live Houses in Nagoya, Osaka and Tokyo. In May, the band performed at Japan Jam. East of Eden covered the song Tango Noir originally performed by Akina Nakamori as part of the tribute album Meikyo.

== Discography ==
=== Albums ===
List of studio albums, showing selected details, chart positions, and sales
Title	Details	Peak positions			Sales
Title	Details	JPN	JPN Cmb.	JPN Hot	Sales
The First Eden -Seeds of Hope	Released: March 12, 2025; Label: Warner Japan; Formats: CD, DL, streaming	20	24	—	JPN: 4,298

=== Extended Plays ===
List of studio albums, showing selected details, chart positions, and sales
Title	Details	Peak positions			Sales
Title	Details	JPN	JPN Cmb.	JPN Hot	Sales
Forbidden Fruit -1st Piece-	Released: December 20, 2023; Label: Victor, JPU; Formats: CD, CD+DVD, DL, streaming	21	34	17	JPN: 3,430
Forbidden Fruit -2nd Piece	Released: July 24, 2024; Label: Victor; Formats: CD, CD+BD, DL, streaming	17	27	16	JPN: 3,262
Rising in Bloom	Released: June 10, 2026; Label: Victor; Formats: CD, DL, streaming	14	—	—	JPN: 3,475
