= Junji Nishimura =

Japanese anime director and producer (born 1955)

- Born: December 23, 1955 (age 70); Yobuko, Saga, Japan
- Occupation: Anime director
- Years active: 1980–present

Junji Nishimura (西村 純二, Nishimura Junji; born December 23, 1955) is a Japanese anime director and producer currently residing in Karatsu, Saga. After graduating from Meiji Gakuin University in 1980, Nishimura entered into the anime studio Nishiko Production. Nishimura had his first job as a producer for Baldios in 1980, and went on to be in charge of production in other series such as Six God Combination Godmars, and Magical Princess Minky Momo in 1982. An episode of Urusei Yatsura he directed in 1982, "After You've Gone" (episode #44), was voted the favorite episode of the TV series by Japanese fans. In 1984, Nishimura resigned from Nishiko and in 1985 had his director debut with Pro Golfer Saru. Since then, he has worked as the director on many anime produced by Studio Deen, notably Ranma ½ (serving as series director on later television seasons and for the OVA series as well) and Kyo Kara Maoh!. In 2019, he was named as director of a new anime series, Vladlove, about a girl vampire that was written by Mamoru Oshii and financed by Ichigo Inc.

== Anime involved in ==
- Billy Inu Nandemo Shokai: Director
- Bakuon!!: Director
- Basilisk: The Ōka Ninja Scrolls: Director
- Bermuda Triangle: Colorful Pastrale: Director
- Chained Soldier: Chief director
- Code-E: Screenplay
- D-1 Devastator: Director
- Date A Live F Last Date: Director
- Dog Days: Director
- Extreme Hearts: Director
- Ghost in the Shell: Stand Alone Complex 2nd GIG: Storyboard (ep 29, 33)
- Glasslip: Director
- Kishin Dōji Zenki Gaiden: Anki Kitan: Director
- Koitabi ~True Tours Nanto: Director
- Kyo Kara Maoh!: Director
- Kyo Kara Maoh! R: Director
- Lupin the Third: The Woman Called Fujiko Mine: Script (ep 8)
- Mars: Director
- Mechanical Marie: Director
- Minami no Shima no Chiisana Hikouki Birdy: Series Composition
- Neo Yokio: Director
- OL Kaizo Koza: Storyboard
- Otaku no Seiza: Storyboard
- Pro Golfer Saru: Director
- Ranma ½: Director
- Ranma ½: One Flew Over the Kuno's Nest: Director
- Samurai Deeper Kyo Series director, Storyboard (ep 1–3, 5–6, 11, 14)
- Sengoku Majin GoShogun: Animation director
- Shutendoji: Director (ep 1, 2)
- Simoun: Director, Script (ep 3, 9, 10, 14, 16, 17, 19, 22, 25), Storyboard (ep 1, 2, 8, 12, 14, 16, 19, 22, 24, 25)
- Soul Hunter: Director
- Super Zugan: Director
- The Fire Hunter: Director
- True Tears: Director, Script (ep 2, 5), Storyboard (ep 1, 2, 3, 5), Episode Director (ep 1)
- Urusei Yatsura: Assistant director
- Urusei Yatsura: Beautiful Dreamer: Associate Director
- Violinist of Hameln: Series director
- ViVid Strike!: Director
- Vlad Love: Director
- Windy Tales: Director
- You're Under Arrest: The Movie: Director
- Zenki: Director

== See also ==
- Mamoru Oshii
- Ichigo Inc.
