= Vlad Love =

Japanese anime television series

ぶらどらぶ (Burado Rabu)
- Genre: Comedy, supernatural
- Created by: Mamoru Oshii
- Original net animation
- Directed by: Mamoru Oshii (Note: Credited as Chief Director (総監督, Sō Kantoku).); Junji Nishimura
- Produced by: Haruhiko Kouno; Chie Nakamura; Toshiyuki Tateishi
- Written by: Mamoru Oshii
- Music by: Kenji Kawai
- Studio: Drive
- Licensed by: Crunchyroll (streaming); Anime Limited (home video)
- Released: February 14, 2021 – March 14, 2021
- Episodes: 12

Vlad Love (Japanese: ぶらどらぶ, Hepburn: Burado Rabu) is a Japanese original net animation (ONA) anime series created by Mamoru Oshii. It was animated by Drive and produced by Ichigo Animation. The series was directed by Mamoru Oshii and Junji Nishimura. It was originally scheduled to premiere in October 2020, but it was delayed due to the effects of the COVID-19 pandemic. The first half of the series was released online in February 2021, while the second half was released online in March 2021. The series is a slapstick comedy centred on a vampire girl and a high school girl.

== Plot ==
Mitsugu Bamba, a high school student obsessed with donating blood, one day encounters a pale, mysterious girl named Mai Vlad Transylvania at a blood donation center. After Mai causes a disturbance and collapses, Mitsugu takes her home, only to discover that she is a vampire who has come from Romania, but is unable to drink blood by biting humans.

Taking responsibility for Mai, Mitsugu allows her to live with her and provides her with her blood. In order to secure a steady supply, Mitsugu confides in the eccentric school nurse, Chihiro Chimatsuri, who suggests creating a Blood Donation Club at their school. With Chihiro acting as advisor, the club attracts a group of unusual students, each with their own quirks, and they gradually become involved in keeping Mai's identity a secret while supporting her.

== Characters ==
Mitsugu Bamba (絆播 貢, Banba Mitsugu)
Voiced by: Ayane Sakura
Mai Vlad Transylvania (マイ・ブラド・トランシルヴァニア, Mai Burado Toranshiruvania)
Voiced by: Rina Hidaka
Chihiro Chihmatsuri (血祭 血比呂, Chimatsuri Chihiro)
Voiced by: Romi Park
Nami Unten (雲天 那美, Unten Nami)
Voiced by: Yū Kobayashi
Maki Watabe (渡部 マキ, Watabe Maki)
Voiced by: Saori Hayami
Kaori Konno (紺野 カオル, Konno Kaoru)
Voiced by: Kanako Takatsuki
Jinko Sumida (墨田 仁子, Sumida Jinko)
Voiced by: Yoko Hikasa
Masumi Katsuno (勝野 真澄, Katsuno Masumi)
Voiced by: Kenta Miyake
Okada (岡田)
Voiced by: Kaito Ishikawa
Kambara (神原)
Voiced by: Ryūnosuke Watanuki
Horita (堀田)
Voiced by: Tarō Kiuchi
Mai's dad (マイのパパ, Mai no papa)
Voiced by: Hiroshi Iwasaki
Mitsugu's pops (貢のとーちゃん)
Voiced by: Jouji Nakata

== Production and release ==
The series was created by Mamoru Oshii, who is also credited as chief director, and was directed by Junji Nishimura. The screenplay was written by Oshii and Kei Yamamura featuring character designs by Issei Arakaki, and Kenji Kawai composing the series' music. Oshii announced that the series would focus on five young girls and had no prominent male characters. The series was first announced in May 2019, with further details being revealed in June 2019. The concept and characters originated in the 2013 mobile game Chimamire Mai Love.

The series was funded by a single investor, Ichigo Animation, a subsidiary of Ichigo Inc., a new financing arrangement in Japanese anime that replaces the "sclerotic production committee system" and gives directors like Oshii and Nishimura more freedom, according to The Japan Times.

The opening theme for the "Mai Version" of the series is "Winds of Transylvania" by Lovebites, chosen by Oshii and Nishimura because they felt the band's members and concept were similar to the series' main character and unconventional themes. Lovebites' members appear in the anime's opening credits, which also features Vlad Love's fictional characters performing the song in a sequence that the animators based on the band's. "Where You Are" performed by Kanako Takatsuki and Karin Isobe as part of the vocal and dance unit BlooDye is used for the "Mitsugu Version" of the opening sequence. alan and Ayasa performed the ending theme "Akai Ame" (赤い雨) for the Japanese version of the series, while Ayasa alone performed the instrumental "Shingetsu" (新月) for the ending of the international versions. A CD including all four theme songs was released at Ichigo Animation's CulZone stores on January 9, 2021.

It was scheduled to premiere in April 2020, but it was delayed to October 2020. On May 8, 2020, it was announced that series was delayed again due to the COVID-19 pandemic. The first episode of the series had an advanced streaming debut on December 18, 2020. On December 28, 2020, it was announced the first half of the series would be released online on AbemaTV, Amazon Prime Video Japan, and various other streaming outlets on February 14, 2021 (Valentine's Day). It was hoped by series producers that the anime would first broadcast on television, but that plan never came into fruition. The second half was released on March 14, 2021 (White Day). Crunchyroll licensed the series.

In May 2025, it was announced that Anime Limited picked up the home video rights for the series in the United States.

=== Episodes ===
No.	Title	Directed by (Note: Information is taken from the ending credits of each episode.)	Written by	Original release date
1	"A Vampire Girl Becomes Excited"; Transliteration: "Kyūketsu Musume no Chi ga Sawagu" (Japanese: 吸血娘の血が騒ぐ)	Shōta Hamada	Mamoru Oshii	February 14, 2021 (Note: This episode had an advanced streaming debut on December 18, 2020.)
2	"Love Takes Flight at Night"; Transliteration: "Ai no Yakan Hikō" (Japanese: 愛の夜間飛行)	Yūjirō Abe	Kei Yamamura	February 14, 2021
3	"Sabbath Night Fever"; Transliteration: "Sabato Naito Fībā" (Japanese: さばと・ナイト・フィーバー)	Toshiyuki Sone	Mamoru Oshii	February 14, 2021
4	"Salamander's Night"; Transliteration: "Saramandā no Yoru" (Japanese: サラマンダーの夜)	Mizuho Nishikubo	Mamoru Oshii	February 14, 2021
5	"Daddy Came"; Transliteration: "Tōchan ga Kita" (Japanese: 父ちゃんが来た)	Sachiko Kanno	Kei Yamamura	February 14, 2021
6	"Castle of Vania"; Transliteration: "Akuma no Shiro Dorakyura" (Japanese: 悪魔の城ドラキュラ)	Shōta Hamada	Mamoru Oshii	February 14, 2021
7	"Day for Night"	Sachiko Kanno	Mamoru Oshii	March 14, 2021
8	"A Long Story"; Transliteration: "Rongu Sutōrī" (Japanese: ろんぐすとおりぃ)	Junji Nishimura	Kei Yamamura	March 14, 2021
9	"Bolted"; Transliteration: "Boruto-shiki" (Japanese: ボルト式)	Mizuho Nishikubo	Mamoru Oshii	March 14, 2021
10	"My Fiance is an Artificial Human"; Transliteration: "Kon'yakusha wa Jinzō Ningen" (Japanese: 婚約者は人造人間)	Toshiyuki Sone	Kei Yamamura	March 14, 2021
11	"Midsummer Night’s Mystery"; Transliteration: "Manatsu no Yoru no Kaiki Dai Sakusen" (Japanese: 真夏の夜の怪奇大作戦)	Tomoe Makino	Kei Yamamura	March 14, 2021
12	"Interview with Mai"; Transliteration: "Intabyū wizu Mai" (Japanese: インタビュー・ウィズ・マイ)	Shōta Hamada	Mamoru Oshii	March 14, 2021
