= Yūka Nishio =

Japanese musician, singer, voice actress and DJ

- 西尾 夕香
- Born: Haruka Nishio; March 31, 1994 (age 32); Kanagawa Prefecture, Japan
- Other name: Haruca
- Education: Keio University
- Occupations: Musician, singer, voice actress, DJ
- Years active: 2016–present
- Agent: Hibiki
- Known for: BanG Dream! as Nanami Hiromachi; D4DJ as Rinku Aimoto

Haruka Nishio (西尾 晴香, Nishio Haruka; born March 31, 1994), better known by her stage name Yūka Nishio (西尾 夕香, Nishio Yūka) is a Japanese musician, singer, voice actress and DJ from Kanagawa Prefecture who is affiliated with Hibiki. She was formerly active as a solo musician under the name Haruca, releasing the single "Eien no Kotae" in 2017. She is known for her roles as Nanami Hiromachi in BanG Dream!, where she also serves as the bassist of the band Morfonica, and as Rinku Aimoto, the protagonist of the multimedia franchise D4DJ.

== Biography ==
Nishio was born in Kanagawa Prefecture on March 31, 1994. During her youth, she played the violin and was in an orchestra in elementary school before quitting as a middle schooler.

She also had an interest in anime and manga from an early age, and upon entering Keio University, she decided to pursue a career as a voice actress. She began her entertainment activities as a singer in 2016 under the stage name Haruca. In October 2017, she released the single "Eien no Kotae" (永遠のこたえ), the title song of which was used as the ending theme to the anime series Kado: The Right Answer; the single peaked at 98 on the Oricon weekly charts.

In April 2019, she joined the talent agency Hibiki following an audition, and changed her stage name to Yūka Nishio. Later in the year, she was cast as Rinku Aimoto, the main protagonist of the franchise D4DJ and member of the unit Happy Around!. Before joining the series, Nishio had DJing experience at a club. She also voiced Yuu Higashiyama for the collectible card game Rebirth for you and its corresponding anime Rebirth.

In 2020, Nishio joined the music project BanG Dream!, voicing the character Nanami Hiromachi as well as becoming bassist of the band Morfonica. She was unfamiliar with the bass guitar prior to joining the band; as Morfonica is a rock violin group, Nishio developed a rapport with violinist and bandmate Ayasa over their mutual background in the instrument. Nishio co-hosts the YouTube series Monica Radio alongside bandmate Hina Suguta. On August 22–23, she participated in the BanG Dream! 8th Live by performing with Happy Around! as the opening act to Raise A Suilen's The Depths concert and with Morfonica on the following day's Special Live: Summerly Tone.

On April 21, 2022, Hibiki announced Nishio had tested positive for COVID-19, forcing her to skip upcoming events like Morfonica's Resonance concert and D4DJ's anniversary program. For the former, backing tracks of her vocals and bass were used in her place.

== Filmography ==
=== Anime ===
2020

- BanG Dream! Girls Band Party! Pico: Ohmori, Nanami Hiromachi
- D4DJ First Mix, Rinku Aimoto
- ReBirth, Yuu Higashiyama

2021

- D4DJ Petit Mix, Rinku Aimoto
- BanG Dream! Film Live 2nd Stage, Nanami Hiromachi
- BanG Dream! Girls Band Party! Pico Fever!, Nanami Hiromachi
- The Fruit of Evolution, Eris McClain

2022

- BanG Dream! Poppin'Dream!, Nanami Hiromachi
- BanG Dream! Morfonication, Nanami Hiromachi

2023

- D4DJ All Mix, Rinku Aimoto
- Cardfight!! Vanguard DivineZ, Nao Inabe

=== Video games ===
2020

- D4DJ Groovy Mix, Rinku Aimoto
- BanG Dream! Girls Band Party!, Nanami Hiromachi

2022

- Cardfight!! Vanguard Dear Days, Yuki Ichidoji

2025

- Cardfight!! Vanguard Dear Days 2, Yuki Ichidoji, Nao Inabe

=== Dubbing ===
- Middlemost Post, Lily
