= Ichigo Inc. =

Japanese infrastructure company

- Native name: いちご株式会社
- Romanized name: Ichigo Kabushiki-gaisha
- Company type: Public KK
- Traded as: TYO: 2337; First Section, Tokyo Stock Exchange
- Industry: Real estate and renewable energy
- Predecessors: Asset Managers Holdings, Ichigo Group Holdings
- Founded: March 17, 2000; 26 years ago
- Headquarters: Imperial Hotel Tower; 1-1-1, Uchisaiwaicho; Chiyoda-ku, Tokyo, Japan
- Key people: Scott Callon (Chairman); Kenji Iwasaki (Chairman); Takuma Hasegawa (President)
- Revenue: ¥83.5 billion (February 28, 2019)
- Net income: ¥15.4 billion (February 28, 2019)
- Website: www.ichigo.gr.jp/en

Ichigo Inc. (いちご株式会社, Ichigo Kabushiki-gaisha) is a Japanese sustainable infrastructure company based in Tokyo. It is active in real estate, renewable energy, asset management, boutique hotels, precision agriculture, anime production and other businesses.

Ichigo's sustainable infrastructure businesses share a common goal of promoting socially and environmentally sound development. In real estate, Ichigo specializes in the renovation and improvement of existing buildings, an approach that challenges the demolition and redevelopment prevalent in Japan's real estate industry. The company also manages publicly listed funds investing in offices, hotels, and solar power plants. As of 2019, Ichigo and its subsidiaries own and manage some 520 billion yen worth of real estate, centered on the Tokyo metropolitan area.

In 2019, Ichigo became a top partner of the J.League, Japan's professional football league, in an agreement that will allow Ichigo to renovate and manage stadiums.

In renewable energy, it is one of Japan's largest independent solar power producers, owning or operating 60 solar and wind plants across Japan as of February 2020, including the largest solar plant in the Kanto region around Tokyo. It is building a wind farm near Fukushima, and also operates floating solar plants.

In 2017, Ichigo opened one of the first boutique hotels in Japan, in the port city of Yokohama. Ichigo opened a second boutique hotel in Tokyo's Shinjuku district, and is now building and operating boutique hotels across Japan.

In 2019, Ichigo started investing in Japanese anime, including the latest production by Mamoru Oshii, known for Ghost in the Shell. The series, called Vladlove, is written by Oshii and co-directed by Junji Nishimura. The move has been described in The Japan Times as part of a new wave in financing Japanese anime that will challenge the “sclerotic production committee system” and give more creative freedom to directors like Oshii. Ichigo also owns the Akiba Cultures Zone, a large retail building in Tokyo's Akihabara neighborhood that is a center for Japan's anime subculture.

Ichigo builds and leases smart greenhouses, which use sensors and processors from the IoT (Internet of Things) to optimize levels of CO_{2}, water and other inputs to increase agricultural yields.

The company was founded in 2000 as Asset Managers, which was a leader in the securitization of nonperforming loans. In 2008, Ichigo Asset Management, a long-term Japan investor, became its largest shareholder. The company changed its name to Ichigo Group Holdings two years later, and in 2015 simplified that to Ichigo Inc. The name comes from Ichi-go ichi-e, an ancient Japanese idiom meaning “one lifetime, one encounter.”

The company also sponsors several internationally competitive athletes, including Olympic medalist weightlifter Hiromi Miyake, who has been an Ichigo employee since 2007.

== See also ==
- Mamoru Oshii
- Hiromi Miyake
- Junji Nishimura
- Vladlove
