= Amane Shindō =

Japanese voice actress (born 2004)

- 進藤 あまね
- Born: April 20, 2004 (age 22); Aichi Prefecture, Japan
- Other name: Amanesu
- Occupation: Voice actress
- Years active: 2019–present
- Agent: HiBiKi Cast
- Musical career
- Genres: J-pop; Anison
- Instrument: Vocals
- Years active: 2020–present

Amane Shindō (進藤 あまね, Shindō Amane; born April 20, 2004) is a Japanese voice actress. She has voiced characters in the anime series Bermuda Triangle: Colorful Pastrale, Rebirth, and BanG Dream!, where she is also a member of the band Morfonica, serving as the vocalist and portraying the in-universe character Mashiro Kurata.

== Career ==
Shindō signed a contract with HiBiKi agency at the age of 14. In 2019, she made her voice acting debut in the Bermuda Triangle: Colorful Pastrale anime series where she voiced Caro. She also portrayed Shūko Mino in the Rebirth short anime series, part of Bushiroad's Rebirth for you card game.

In March 2020, Bushiroad announced the formation of Morfonica, a live action band for the company's BanG Dream! franchise, with Shindō handling vocals and portraying in-universe character Mashiro Kurata. She was already familiar with the series prior to Morfonica, having regularly played the mobile game BanG Dream! Girls Band Party!. At 15 years old, she was the youngest voice actress in the franchise and the same age as Mashiro during her introduction. Series creator Takaaki Kidani felt the shared age emphasizes the connection between Shindō and her character, including their real-life and in-universe growths, respectively.

In an interview with Famitsu magazine, Shindō noted that she has a low voice in contrast to Mashiro's intended pitch, so she tries to perform Morfonica songs in a higher tone. In the wake of backlash and cyberbullying from parts of the fan base for her singing voice and the addition of Morfonica to Girls Band Party! before fellow band Raise A Suilen, Bushiroad and her agency have stated their intention to take legal action.

Shindō is also involved in Bushiroad's D4DJ franchise as a member of the DJ unit Lyrical Lily, for which she voices the character Haruna Kasuga.

In 2024, she started appearing in Link! Like! Love Live! as Izumi Katsuragi, who was initially a supporting character before joining the main cast the following year. She and Miu Miyake (as Ceras Yanagida Lilienfeld) form the sub-unit Edel Note. Shindō was a fan of the Love Live! franchise growing up, idolizing School Idol Project member Suzuko Mimori and being motivated to audition for HiBiKi since Mimori was contracted to them too.

== Personal life ==
Shindō was born in Aichi Prefecture on April 20, 2004. In 2025, she received threats over allegations that she had cheated on her partner. Bushiroad also issued a response which stated that such allegations were "completely false and unacceptable".

== Discography ==
- Cosmic CoaStar (2020; ith Lyrical Lily)

== Filmography ==
=== Anime ===
2020

- Assault Lily Bouquet as Akari Tamba

2021

- BanG Dream! Film Live 2nd Stage
- BanG Dream! Girls Band Party! Pico Fever!

2022

- BanG Dream! Poppin'Dream!
- BanG Dream! Morfonication
- Life with an Ordinary Guy Who Reincarnated into a Total Fantasy Knockout as Ultina
- Cardfight!! Vanguard will+Dress as Megumi Ōkura

2023

- D4DJ All Mix as Haruna Kasuga

2025

- The 100 Girlfriends Who Really, Really, Really, Really, Really Love You 2nd Season as Kurumi Haraga

2026

- Love Live! Hasunosora Girls' High School Idol Club Bloom Garden Party as Izumi Katsuragi

=== Video games ===
- Quiz RPG: The World of Mystic Wiz as Enigma Clover
- Nekopara: Sekai Connect (2026) as Licorice

=== Live action ===
- Kamen Rider 555 20th Paradise Regained (2024) as Smart Lady
