= Morfonica =

Japanese band

- Promotional art from the band's reveal, from left to right: Rui, Nanami, Mashiro, Tsukushi, and Tōko

Background information
- Origin: Japan
- Genres: Pop rock, progressive rock, rock violin
- Years active: 2020–present
- Label: Bushiroad Music
- Spinoff of: BanG Dream!
- Members: Amane Shindō (Mashiro Kurata); Hina Suguta (Tōko Kirigaya); Yūka Nishio (Nanami Hiromachi); mika (Tsukushi Futaba); Ayasa (Rui Yashio)

Morfonica is a Japanese all-female rock band that is part of Bushiroad's media franchise BanG Dream!. Formed in 2020, the group's members portray fictional characters in the project's anime series and mobile game BanG Dream! Girls Band Party! in addition to performing their characters' respective instruments in live concerts.

The band consists of Amane Shindō (vocals), Hina Suguta (guitar), Yūka Nishio (bass), Mika (drums), and Ayasa (violin). In the game, Morfonica is represented by five first-year students at the prestigious Tsukinomori Girls' Academy: Mashiro Kurata (Shindō), Tōko Kirigaya (Suguta), Nanami Hiromachi (Nishio), Tsukushi Futaba (Mika), and Rui Yashio (Ayasa).

Of the twelve bands in BanG Dream!, Morfonica is one of seven whose members perform their own music during live shows.

== History ==
Morfonica's formation was announced on 1 March 2020 during the franchise's live stream BanG Dream! Girls Band Party! @HHW CiRCLE Live Broadcasting Pre-3rd Anniversary Special. The band is the seventh in the franchise and the fourth that performs in live concerts after Poppin'Party, Roselia, and Raise A Suilen. Morfonica is the only group in the project with a violinist, which was conceived by BanG Dream! Girls Band Party! developer Craft Egg to differentiate them from the others.

During the stream, a music video for their song "Daylight" was broadcast; the video was animated by the BanG Dream! anime's studio Sanzigen. A live-action music video and an introduction clip starring the voice actresses were released four days later. The Morfonica-centric weekly YouTube show Morfonical, hosted by the band's members, began airing on 24 March.

On 13 May, Morfonica was named Tower Records' recommended artist of May 2020. "Daylight" was released as their debut single two weeks later on 27 May. The single sold over 15,000 copies in its first week, and peaked at second on the Oricon Weekly Singles Chart. In June, the BanG Dream! Girls Band Party! Cover Collection Vol. 4, a series of cover songs by Morfonica and other bands in the franchise, topped Oricon's Weekly Albums Chart with 2,231 sales in the opening week.

The band's first concert, Special Live: Summerly Tone at the BanG Dream! 8th Live Summer Outdoors 3 Days alongside Poppin'Party and Pastel Palettes' Ami Maeshima with Raise A Suilen, took place on 23 August at Fuji-Q Highland Conifer Forest. Morfonica was the first of the three acts to perform, playing five songs. Cantabile, Morfonica's maiden standalone performance, came on 7 October at Tokyo Garden Theater. The live featured 12 songs, including the two from the "Daylight" single and four cover versions of popular anime theme music.

Morfonica's second single "Bloom Bloom", which was revealed during Cantabile, was released on 13 January 2021. The group held a "Friendship Live" concert with Poppin'Party, known as Astral Harmony, on 23 February at Yokohama Arena. The band's second standalone show, titled Andante, took place on 21 May at Zepp Haneda. Morfonica also performed alongside Raise A Suilen at the BanG Dream! 9th Live, subtitled Mythology, on 4–5 September at Fuji-Q Highland Conifer Forest. A sequel to Mythology was held 18 June 2022.

"Harmony Day", the band's third single, came out on 6 October 2021. One of the single's tracks, "Fateful..." was used as the second ending theme music for the anime Cardfight!! Vanguard overDress. Later in the month, Morfonica began a two-stop concert tour, titled Amabile, at Zepp Osaka Bayside on 28 October and Zepp Haneda on 5 November.

In 2022, Morfonica partnered with Jun'ichi Satō of the band Fhána for a song composed by Satō titled "The Circle of Butterflies". The collaboration also included Morfonica covers of Fhána's songs "Rhapsody of Blue Sky" and "Divine Intervention". The band's fourth single "fly with the night" was released on 30 March. They held the Resonance show at Tokyo Dome City Hall on 24 April; Nishio did not take part after testing positive for COVID-19, and backing tracks of her bass and vocals were used in her place.

== Members ==
- Amane Shindō (Mashiro Kurata, vocals): The youngest voice actress in BanG Dream!, Shindō was 15 when she joined the franchise. Like Mashiro, Shindō was a first-year high school student at the time of Morfonica's creation, which franchise creator Takaaki Kidani felt emphasized the connection between Shindō and her fictional persona. She was a fan of Girls Band Party! prior to Morfonica, while her voice acting roles included the anime Bermuda Triangle: Colorful Pastrale. In a 2020 interview with Famitsu, she noted that since she has a low voice in contrast to Mashiro's intended pitch, she performs Morfonica songs in a higher tone.
- Hina Suguta (Tōko Kirigaya, guitar): Before joining BanG Dream!, Suguta was a voice actress in Afterlost. She is a host of the Morfonica-based YouTube series Monica Radio.
- Yūka Nishio (Nanami Hiromachi, bass): Nishio's previous voice acting experience included portraying Yuu Higashiyama in ReBirth for You. Along with Suguta, Nishio co-hosts Monica Radio.
- Mika (Tsukushi Futaba, drums): Mika was the instructor for Poppin'Party and Roselia's drummers Ayaka Ōhashi and Megu Sakuragawa prior to Morfonica, and she also provided support drums for Poppin'Party at the BanG Dream! 7th Live. Tsukushi is her debut role as a voice actress.
- Ayasa (Rui Yashio, violin): Rui is Ayasa's first voice acting role. Outside of the franchise, she is a YouTube personality who performs violin covers of popular anime songs. She has also worked as a session musician for various artists.

== In-universe band ==
In the anime and game, Morfonica is a band of first-year high school students at the prestigious Tsukinomori Girls' Academy. The group is formed by Mashiro Kurata, a new student who struggles to fit in with her more accomplished peers, after attending a concert by Poppin'Party and the other major bands. Morfonica is a portmanteau of "morpho", in reference to their goals of changing themselves for the better (a metamorphosis), and "symphonic", alluding to their use of a violin.

Morfonica's characters first appeared in Girls Band Party! in the main story's second season in 2019, and were formally added as a group during the third-year anniversary on 15 March 2020 and later worldwide in 2021. The band makes its anime debut in the 2020 spin-off series BanG Dream! Girls Band Party! Pico: Ohmori. A two-episode original anime focusing on the band titled Morfonication premiered in July 2022.

== Discography ==
As of 28 September 2022, Morfonica has 13 original songs.

=== Singles ===
Year	Title	Coupling track	Release date	Peak Oricon chart position	Notes	Ref
2020	"Daylight" (Daylight -デイライト- 」)	"Prelude to Gold" (金色へのプレリュード, Konjiki e no Prelude)	27 May	2		
2021	"Bloom Bloom (ブルームブルーム)	"flame of hope"	13 January	6		
2021	"Harmony Day" (ハーモニー・デイ)	"Sonorous", "Fateful..."	6 October	8		
2022	"fly with the Night"	"Secret Dawn"	30 March	7		
2022	"Yorube no Sunny, Sunny" (寄る辺のSunny, Sunny)	"One Step at a Time"	14 September	23	Limited edition release includes Morfonication soundtrack	
2024	"Brilliance of Wings" (両翼のBrilliance, Ryouyoku no Brilliance)	"Serenade of Gratitude Sound" (音がえしのセレナーデ, Ongaeshi no Serenade), "Trail to the Blue Sky" (蒼穹へのトレイル, Soukyuu e no Trail)	1 May	14		
2024	"Tempest"	"Wreath of Brave"	9 October	16		
2025	"Feathered Dreams"	"Color of Us", "Portray Empathy"	27 August	12	Opening theme for Cardfight!! Vanguard Divinez Final Deluxe Arc	
2026	"Resonant Strings"	"Shining Leaves", "Beauty-ful" (ビューティ・フォー)	22 April	TBA		

=== Albums ===
Year	Title	Release date	Peak Oricon chart position	Notes	Ref
2020	BanG Dream! Girls Band Party! Cover Collection Vol. 4 (バンドリ！ ガールズバンドパーティ！ カバーコレクション Vol.4)	27 May	1	Joined by Poppin'Party, Afterglow, Pastel Palettes, Roselia, Hello, Happy World!, and Raise A Suilen	
2020	Garupa Vocaloid Cover Collection (ガルパ ボカロカバーコレクション)	16 December	4	Joined by Poppin'Party, Afterglow, Pastel Palettes, Roselia, Hello, Happy World!, and Raise A Suilen	
2021	BanG Dream! Girls Band Party! Cover Collection Vol. 5 (バンドリ！ ガールズバンドパーティ！ カバーコレクションVol.5)	24 February	6	Joined by Poppin'Party, Afterglow, Pastel Palettes, Roselia, Hello, Happy World!, and Raise A Suilen	
2021	"BanG Dream! FILM LIVE 2nd Stage" Special Songs	25 August	13	Joined by Poppin'Party, Afterglow, Pastel Palettes, Roselia, Hello, Happy World!, and Raise A Suilen	
2021	BanG Dream! Girls Band Party! Cover Collection Vol. 6 (バンドリ！ ガールズバンドパーティ！ カバーコレクションVol.6)	10 November	4	Joined by Poppin'Party, Afterglow, Pastel Palettes, Roselia, Hello, Happy World!, and Raise A Suilen	
2022	BanG Dream! Dreamer's Best	16 March	6	Fan vote-determined compilation album with Morfonica's "Daylight", "flame of hope", and "Bloom Bloom" included	
2022	BanG Dream! Girls Band Party! Cover Collection Vol. 7 (バンドリ！ ガールズバンドパーティ！ カバーコレクションVol.7)	14 December	13	Joined by Poppin'Party, Afterglow, Pastel Palettes, Roselia, Hello, Happy World!, and Raise A Suilen	
2023	Quintet	15 March	9		
2025	Polyphony	12 March	21		
