= Bermuda Triangle: Colorful Pastrale =

Japanese anime television series

- Promotional art for the anime.

バミューダトライアングル 〜カラフル・パストラーレ〜 (Bamyuuda Toraianguru: Karafuru Pasutoraare)
- Genre: Fantasy
- Anime television series
- Directed by: Junji Nishimura
- Produced by: Bushiroad
- Written by: Michiko Yokote
- Studio: Seven Arcs Pictures
- Licensed by: NA: Sentai Filmworks
- Original network: Tokyo MX, Sun TV, AT-X, BS11
- Original run: January 12, 2019 – March 30, 2019
- Episodes: 12

Bermuda Triangle: Colorful Pastrale (バミューダトライアングル 〜カラフル・パストラーレ〜, Bamyūda Toraianguru: Karafuru Pasutorāre) is a Japanese original anime television series by studio Seven Arcs Pictures. The series premiered from January 12 to March 30, 2019.

== Plot ==
The series takes place in a quiet, rural sea far from the bustling metropolis where a group of mermaid idols swim and dance underwater as they sing.

== Characters ==
Caro (キャロ, Kyaro)
Voiced by: Amane Shindō
Sonata (ソナタ)
Voiced by: Larissa Tago Takeda
Kanon (カノン)
Voiced by: Moeka Hiraguri
Fina (フィナ)
Voiced by: Risa Tsumugi
Serena (セレナ)
Voiced by: Hikaru Tono
Ardi (アルディ, Arudi)
Voiced by: Noriko Hidaka
Ferma (フェルマ, Feruma)
Voiced by: Kikuko Inoue
Frase (フラゼ)
Voiced by: Ayaka Shimoyamada
Coda (コーダ)
Voiced by: Rina Takatsuki
Chante (シャンテ)
Voiced by: Yumi Uchiyama
Maltre (マルトレ)
Voiced by: Emiko Takeuchi
Léger (レジェ)
Voiced by: Chiwa Saitō
Poko (ポコ)
Voiced by: Eriko Matsui
Mail Carrier Azarashi (アザラシ郵便)
Voiced by: Hirofumi Nojima
Capri (カプリ)
Voiced by: Eriko Matsui
Adele (アデル)
Voiced by: Yume Miyamoto
Natura (ナチュラ)
Voiced by: Amina Satō
Manta (マンタ)
Voiced by: Takashi Matsuyama

== Production and release ==
The series was announced during a Cardfight!! Vanguard event. The series is produced by Bushiroad and animated by Seven Arcs Pictures, with Junji Nishimura serving as the director and Michiko Yokote writing the script. Takayoshi Hashimoto is designing the series characters based on the original designs produced by Takuya Fujima. The series aired from January 12 to March 30, 2019, on Tokyo MX. Sentai Filmworks have licensed the series.

No.	Title (Note: All English titles are taken from Hidive.)	Original release date
1	"Welcome to Parrel" "Pāreru e Yōkoso" (パーレルへようこそ)	January 12, 2019
Sonata, Fina, Serena, Carol – a quartet of mermaid idols – spend their days in the peaceful village of Parrel with their dog, Poko. One day, a package arrives via seal mail addressed to Ardi, which turns out to be a Cineorb.
2	"So Many Cineorbs" "Kineobu ga Konna ni" (キネオ一ブがこんなに)	January 19, 2019
Sonata, Fina, Serena, and Carol are captivated by the Cineorbs unfolding before them in an old theater they stumble upon those. Although Ardi prohibits them from entering the theater, the four girls refuse and try to begin their plan.
3	"Five of Us, Together" "5-nin Issho" (5人いつしよ)	January 26, 2019
The mermaid idols aim to revive an abandoned film theater by gathering opinions from villagers to make it a comfortable place for everyone.
4	"Bold with Everything You've Got" "Daitan ni Omoikitte" (大胆に思い切つて)	February 2, 2019
The mermaid idols find a Cineorb containing the film that only plays haunted house-like sounds. Serena encounters three small children on her way to the library to do research on said film through the projector.
5	"Surprise and Excitement" "Bikkuri Waku-waku" (びっくりワクワク)	February 9, 2019
Having restored the theater and fixed the projector, the mermaid idols begin a film screenplay. However, they struggle to select a film and deciding on a date to inform the villagers.
6	"Tell Me Your Name" "Anata no Namae o Oshiete" (あなたの名前を教えて)	February 16, 2019
Fina visits to the movie theater to look for her forgotten thing.
7	"So, I'll Just Have it All" "Dakara Zenbu Itadaku wa" (だから全部いただくわ)	February 23, 2019
A pop star hailing from a metropolis arrives in Parrel and enters the dormitory where Caro, Sonata, Kanon, Fina, and Serena live.
8	"Well, Those are Called Shoes" "Sore wa ne, Kutsutsute Iu no" (それはね、靴つていうの)	March 2, 2019
Caro, Sonata, Kanon, Fina, and Serena use a magical item that allows them to walk on land like humans to run an errand. While the other four mermaid idols experience walking on feet for the first time, Serena struggles to do it.
9	"Hey, Do You Want Some Too?" "Ne, Kimi mo Taberu?" (ね、君も食べる？)	March 9, 2019
A film crew arrives in the peaceful village of Perleil, causing a huge commotion. While Caro, Sonata, Kanon, Fina, and Serena are helping them out, the cameraman suddenly asks Caro to star in the film.
10	"How Do You Take This Anyway?" "Kore, Dō Yatte Toru no?" (これ、どうやって撮るの？)	March 16, 2019
Sonata finds a Cineorb that has not recorded anything and decides to try filming with it. Struggling what to film, Ardi asks her to record the village festival.
11	"This Song's..." "Kono Kyoku wa" (この曲は)	March 23, 2019
The mermaid idols reminisce their past experiences until Kanon receives a letter from Verata, the Guardian of Atlantia, who invites them to participate in another audition.
12	"Become a Small Light, and Shine" "Chīsana Hikari to Natte Kagayaite" (小さな光となって輝いて)	March 30, 2019
As the mermaid idols host their final concert, Mail Carrier Azarashi brought some letters from Kanon that have been sent years ago.
