= Lacus Timoris =

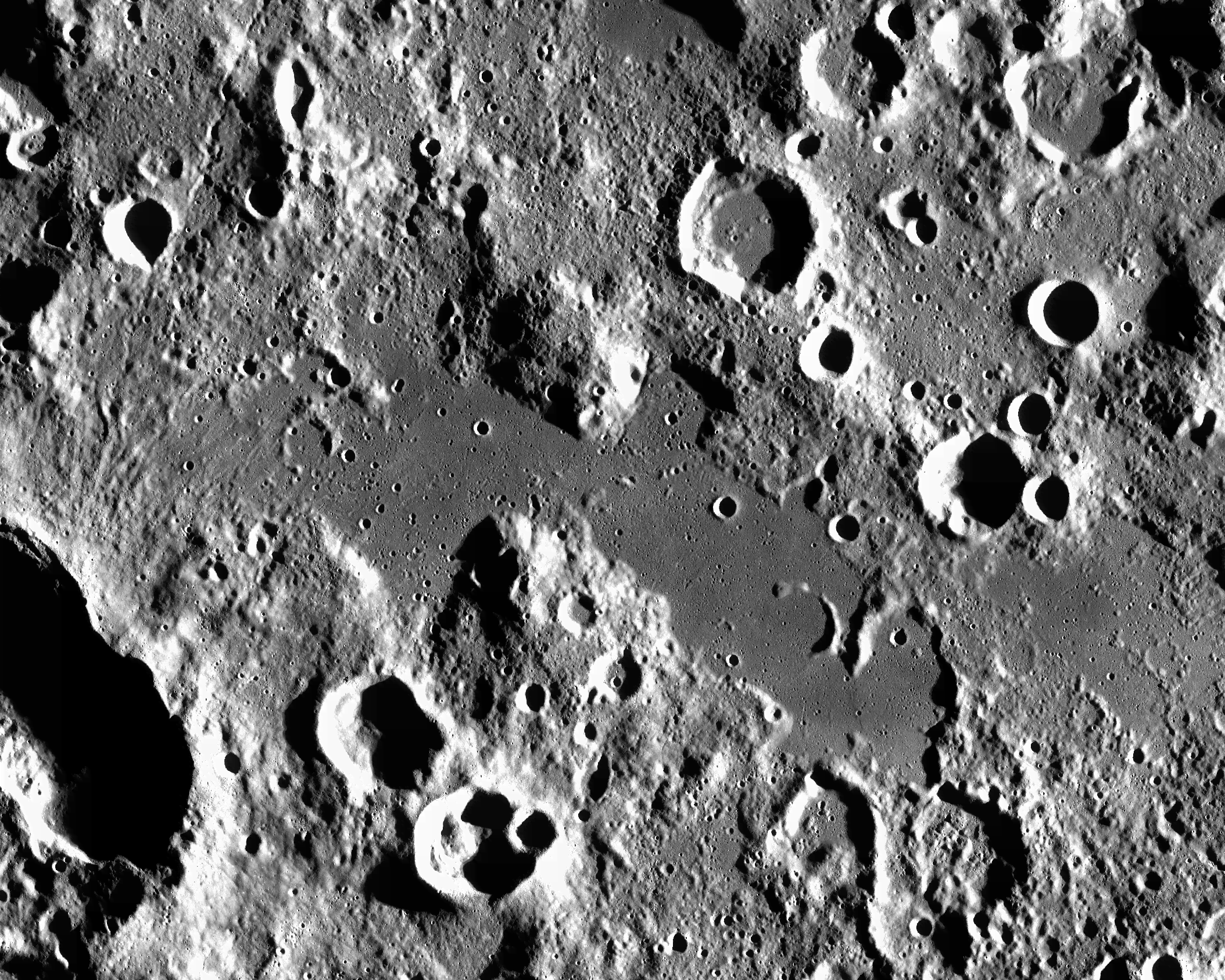
- Mosaic of photos by Lunar Reconnaissance Orbiter
- Coordinates: 39.4°S 27.9°W
- Diameter: 154 km

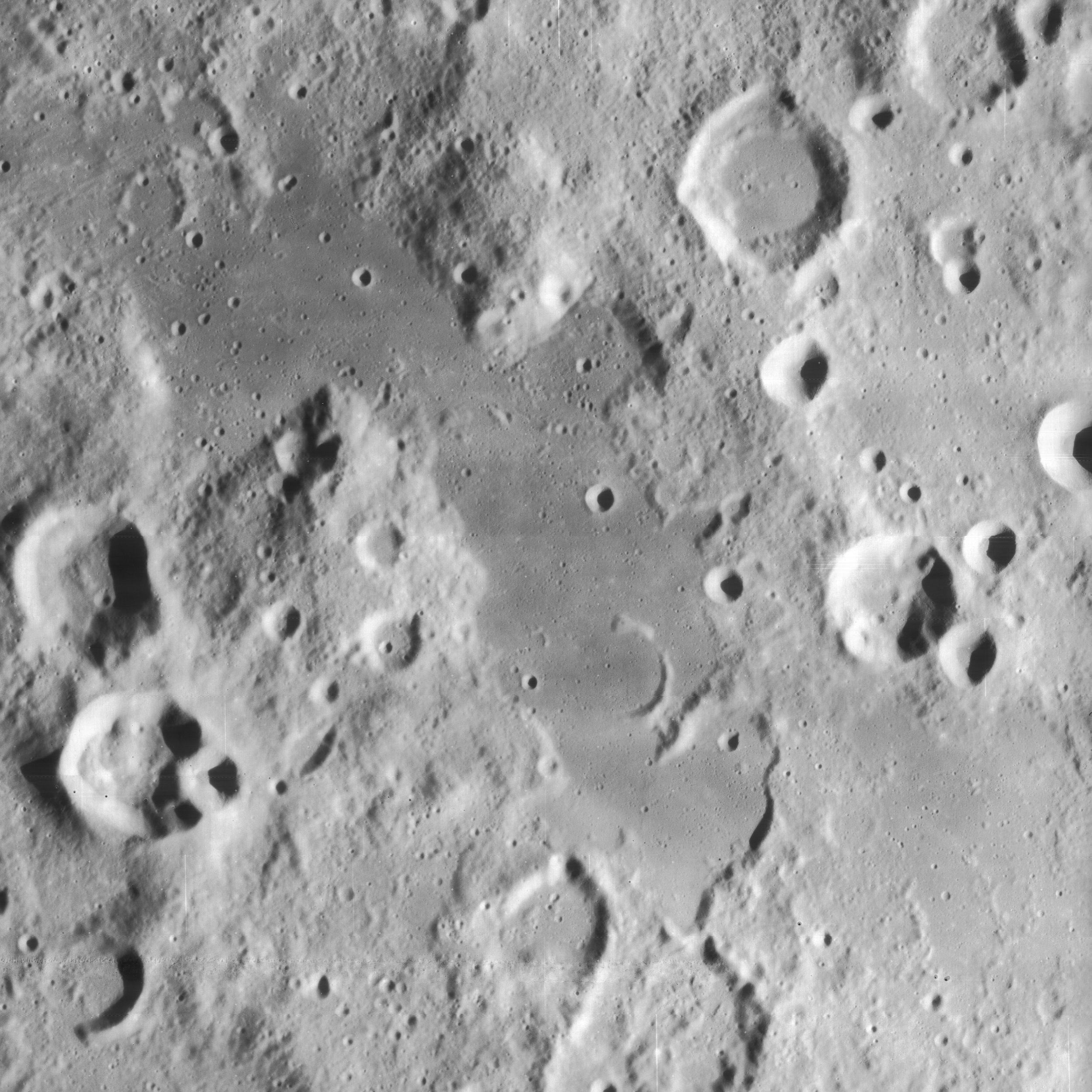
Lunar Orbiter 4 image

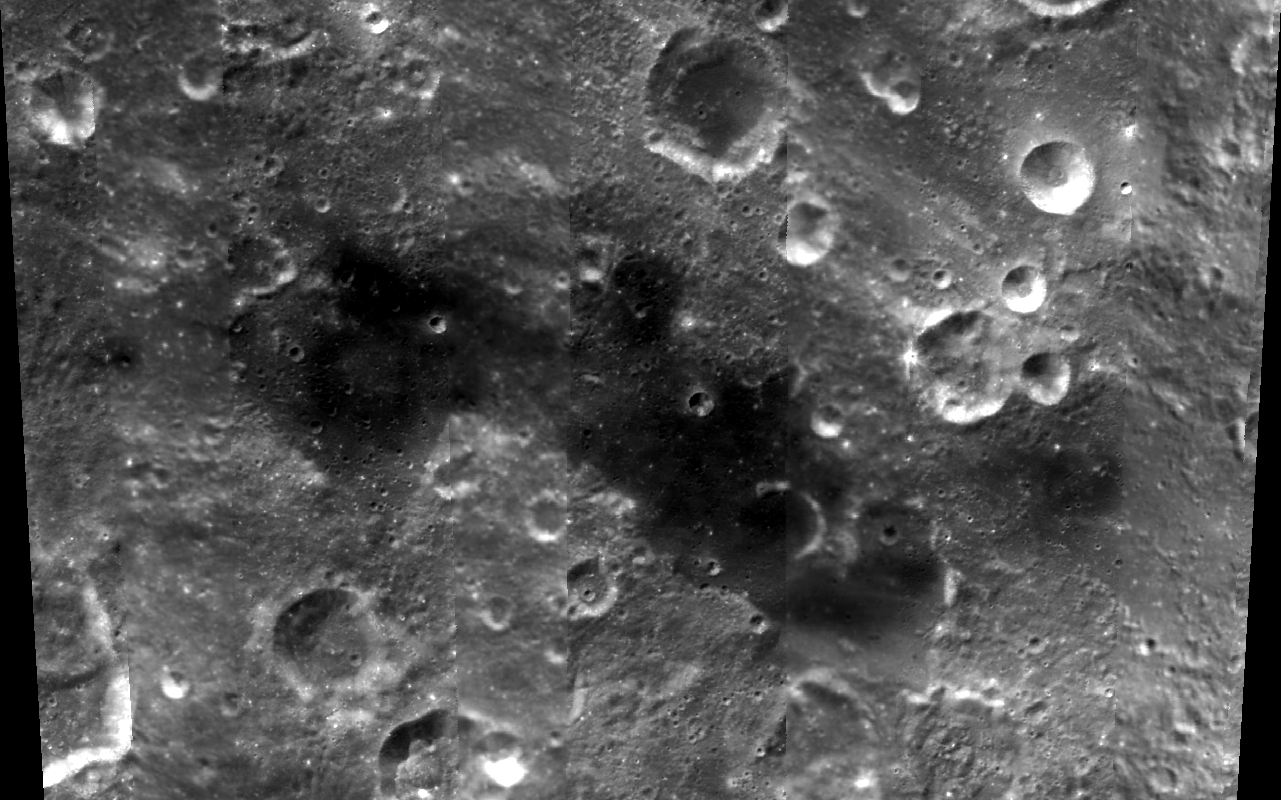
Clementine image

Lacus Timoris /ˈleɪkəs tɪˈmɔːrɪs/ (Latin timōris, "Lake of Fear") is a small lunar mare on the Moon. It is located at 39.4° S, 27.9° W and is 154 km in diameter.
