= Roland Juno-G =

Music workstation/synth

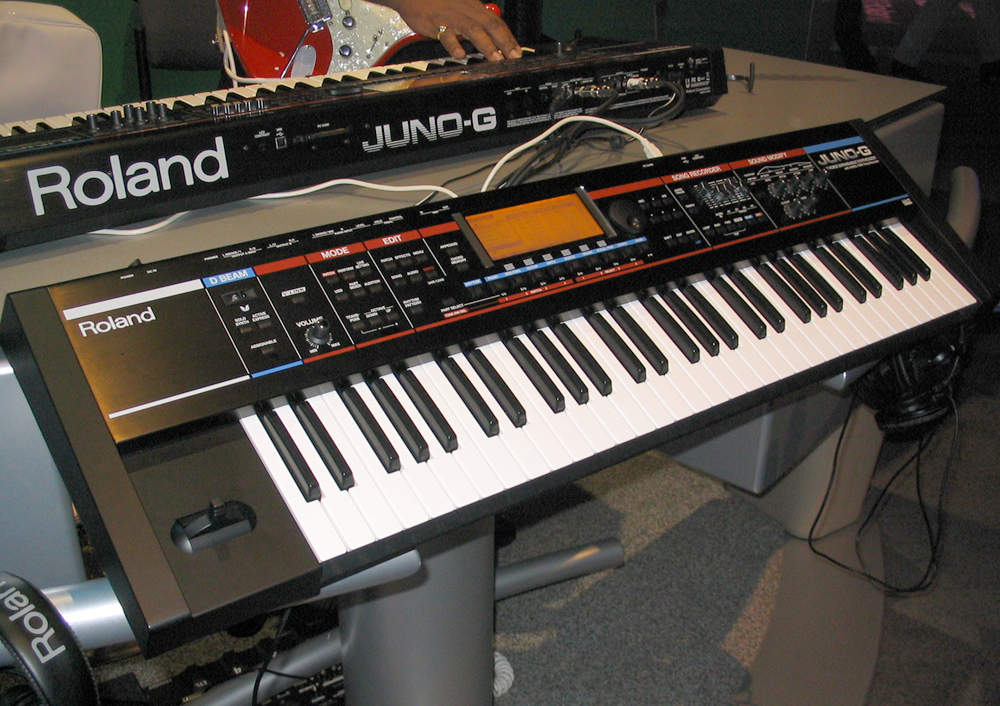
- Manufacturer: Roland
- Dates: 2006 - 2012
- Price: 1,000EUR / US$1,000

Technical specifications
- Polyphony: 128 voices
- Timbrality: 16
- LFO: 2
- Synthesis type: sample-based Subtractive
- Filter: 1
- Attenuator: 1
- Aftertouch expression: No
- Velocity expression: Yes
- Storage memory: 4 MB + DIMM slot
- Effects: 78

Input/output
- External control: USB, MIDI

Roland Juno-G is a music workstation/synth introduced in 2006 by Roland Corporation. It is based on the Fantom-X series, having a vintage design that resembles the first Juno synthesizers, such as the Juno-106. The Juno-G's main competitors in the approximate price range, with similar features, when first released, were the Korg Triton Le/TR and Yamaha MO6 workstation synthesizers.

Despite the similar name and later introduction, the Juno-G was not set to replace the popular Juno-D synthesizer: for they both ran concurrently. Apart from the Juno name, the G and the D have little similarities, the D having its roots in Roland's RS PCM machines. The Juno-G was discontinued in 2010, when Roland introduced its successor, the Juno-Gi.

== Features ==
The Juno-G has the same sound engine as the Fantom-X series: 128-voice polyphony, 768 patches and 256 GM2 patches within the 64 MB of wave memory, with 16 MIDI plus 4 stereo audio tracks for recording and mixing.

It was Windows and Mac compatible, connecting through USB for MIDI and data transfer. However, no MacOS driver software is available for Catalina. Conventional MIDI In and Out sockets are also provided, although there is no MIDI Thru socket. Up to 2 GB CompactFlash and Secure Digital memory cards are accepted using a standard PC card adapter. A single SRX expansion board slot and a PC133 RAM slot is also available for DIMMs up to 512 MB. The Juno-G also utilizes a D-Beam controller.

Version 2 of the keyboard's operating system is available as a free download, which allows user-sampling, waveform editing, and sample triggering.
