= Ayasa (violinist) =

Japanese musician and voice actress

- Born: Ayasa Shimamura; 19 October 1991 (age 34)
- Origin: Tokyo, Japan
- Genres: Rock
- Occupations: Musician; voice actress
- Instrument: Violin
- Years active: 2008–present
- Label: Dreamusic
- Member of: Morfonica; East Of Eden
- Formerly of: Sword of the Far East

Ayasa Shimamura (Japanese: 島村絢沙, Hepburn: Shimamura Ayasa; born 19 October 1991), known professionally by the mononym Ayasa, is a Japanese rock musician and voice actress. She is the violinist for the band Morfonica of the BanG Dream! multimedia franchise, which includes portraying the character Rui Yashio. In addition, she posts YouTube videos where she plays violin covers of anime songs while wearing cosplay and has released several albums with the record label Dreamusic.

== Biography ==
=== 1991–2015: Early life and career, Sword of the Far East ===
Ayasa Shimamura, a native of Tokyo, was born on 19 October 1991, and at the age of three, she started playing the violin. While studying at Toho Girls' High School, Ayasa was ranked 4th place in the 2009 Japan Classical Music Competition's high school violin section. She attended summer seminars at the Accademia Musicale Chigiana and Tokushima Bunri University.

In April 2008, under the name Ayasa Nakamura (中村アヤサ, Nakamura Ayasa), Ayasa made her first acting appearance in a Suntory commercial for their Minami-Alps no Tennensui brand, playing the Vittorio Monti song "Csárdás" on a violin. Ayasa later recalled in a 2019 interview with Oricon News that this gig allowed her to make her first appearance in a national concert tour, namely at Okayama Symphony Hall with the Saint Petersburg Festival Orchestra in December 2009. In 2011, Ayasa became a producer of the Sword of the Far East rock violin music project, serving alongside Do As Infinity band member Dai Nagao. In April 2013, she and media personality Naoki Iketani appeared together at Momoiro Clover Z's Haru no Ichidaiji concert at Seibu Dome.

=== 2015–present: Solo career, Chronicle, and BanG Dream! ===
In January 2015, Ayasa announced that she would depart from Sword of the Far East, citing a desire to do solo work as a reason. In November 2015, she released her first solo album, Chronicle I. In 2016, she teamed up with musical group Nowisee for her next album, Chronicle II. Over the next few years, more albums followed: Chronicle III (2016), Chronicle IV (2016), and Chronicle V (2018). In 2017, she also released a greatest hits album, Best I, and another version, Best I Special Edition Ver.1. In 2019, Ayasa released five albums, one on the first day of each consecutive month: Chronicle VI in June, Chronicle VII in July, Anisong Cover Night Vol.1 in August, Chronicle VIII in September, and Anisong Cover Night Vol.2 in October. Two more albums were later released over the next two years: Anisong Cover Night Vol.3 (2020) and Anisong Cover Night Vol.4 (2021). In May 2023, she released Live In Japan: Symphonic Metallization, a concert album of her performances at the Symphonic Metallization concert in January 2020.

Ayasa, whose love of anime had stemmed from her interest in Rozen Maiden music during her adolescence, later regained interest in anime after watching Code Geass. In the mid-2010s, Ayasa started uploading YouTube videos of herself playing the violin, many of which feature her wearing cosplay. Songs she has covered include "Ichiban no Takaramono (Yui final ver.)" (a song from the Angel Beats! anime franchise) and "Daddy! Daddy! Do! feat. Airi Suzuki" (the opening theme song of Kaguya-sama: Love Is War's second season). Anime! Anime, a Japanese-language anime news site, praised her "splendid cosplay appearance and outstanding violin skills". In an interview with Oricon News in 2018, Ayasa revealed that she started making such videos because she felt that there weren't any other people doing so.

In 2015, she appeared as herself in Not Anymore!, a mockumentary film where she is the subject of a documentary film. In 2016, she appeared in a commercial for the Sony Xperia X Performance smartphone model. She performed the theme song of the TBS White Sacas 10th Anniversary television show, "Kokuhaku no Yoru", which was also included in her album Chronicle V.

In April 2016, she and singer Ataru Nakamura performed with Dir En Grey guitarist Die's new band Decays. In July 2018, Ayasa was announced as a guest in the 2018 Anime Festival Asia event in Jakarta, Indonesia. In August 2018, Ayasa played a violin medley of Fate/Grand Order music at the Fate/Grand Order Fes. 2018, with Akiba Souken calling the performance "sometimes elegant and sometimes intense", and she and singer Akira formed the duo +A and performed the song Bōkyaku no Saint, the ending theme song of Fuji TV show Tune; the song was later released as part of a single on 8 August 2018. In October 2018, Ayasa played the theme song of The Prince of Tennis: Best Games!! Tezuka vs Atobe, and the single it was included in charted at #136 in the Oricon Album Charts. She and singer Alan Dawa Dolma performed the ending theme "Akai Ame" for the Japanese version of the 2021 ONA Vlad Love, and she alone performed the instrumental "Shingetsu" for the ending of the international versions.

In March 2020, Ayasa was announced as the violinist of Morfonica, one of the bands of Bushiroad's BanG Dream! multimedia franchise, and as the voice actor of Rui Yashio, the violinist and composer of the band's fictional counterpart of the same name. Her role as Rui was Ayasa's first voice acting role. Kara Dennison of Otaku USA credited Ayasa's inclusion in the franchise with allowing her "anime fandom [to] hit new heights". In the same year, Ayasa began voicing the character in BanG Dream! Girls Band Party! Pico, the franchise's chibi short anime spinoff. Famitsu praised her violin performance in Morfonica's first standalone concert Cantabile as "elegant and powerful". In 2022, she appeared with the rest of Morfonica in the anime spinoff Morfonication.

In August 2023, Ayasa announced a new band, named East Of Eden, and released first digital single and music video.

== Discography ==
=== Albums ===
Title	Year	Album details	Peak chart positions
Title	Year	Album details	JPN
Chronicle I	2015	Released: 9 December 2015; Label: Juggler	102
Chronicle II	2016	Released: 29 June 2016; Label: Dreamusic	64
Chronicle III	2016	Released: 19 October 2016; Label: Dreamusic	81
Chronicle IV	2016	Released: 21 December 2016; Label: Dreamusic	112
Best I	2017	Released: 25 January 2017; Label: Dreamusic	52
Best I Special Edition Ver.1	2017	Released: 29 March 2017; Label: Dreamusic	112
Chronicle V	2018	Released: 24 January 2018; Label: Dreamusic	91
Chronicle VI	2019	Released: 1 June 2019	— (Note: Chronicle VI did not enter the Top 50 of the Oricon Albums chart, but peaked at number 24 on the Oricon Digital Albums chart.)
Chronicle VII	2019	Released: 1 July 2019	— (Note: Chronicle VII did not enter the Top 50 of the Oricon Albums chart, but peaked at number 27 on the Oricon Digital Albums chart.)
Anisong Cover Night Vol.1	2019	Released: 1 August 2019	— (Note: Anisong Cover Night Vol.1 did not enter the Top 50 of the Oricon Albums chart, but peaked at number 22 on the Oricon Digital Albums chart.)
Chronicle VIII	2019	Released: 1 September 2019	— (Note: Chronicle VIII did not enter the Top 50 of the Oricon Albums chart, but peaked at number 43 on the Oricon Digital Albums chart.)
Anisong Cover Night Vol.2	2019	Released: 1 October 2019	— (Note: Anisong Cover Night Vol.2 did not enter the Top 50 of the Oricon Albums chart, but peaked at number 45 on the Oricon Digital Albums chart.)
Anisong Cover Night Vol.3	2020	Released: 1 July 2020	— (Note: Anisong Cover Night Vol.3 did not enter the Top 50 of the Oricon Albums chart, but peaked at number 22 on the Oricon Digital Albums chart.)
Anisong Cover Night Vol.4	2021	Released: 1 March 2021	— (Note: Anisong Cover Night Vol.4 did not enter the Top 50 of the Oricon Albums chart, but peaked at number 37 on the Oricon Digital Albums chart.)
Live In Japan: Symphonic Metallization	2023	Released: 26 May 2023; Label: Oikos Music	—
"—" denotes releases that did not chart or were not released in that region.

=== Singles ===
Title	Year	Single details	Peak chart positions
Title	Year	Single details	JPN
"Best Games!!"	2018	Released: 24 October 2018; Label: Feel Mee	136

== Filmography ==
=== Anime television ===
- BanG Dream! Girls Band Party! Pico: Ohmori (2020) as Rui Yashio
- BanG Dream! Girls Band Party! Pico Fever! (2021-2022) as Rui Yashio
- BanG Dream! Morfonication (2022) as Rui Yashio

=== Films ===
- Not Anymore! (2015) as Ayasa
- BanG Dream! Film Live 2nd Stage (2021) as Rui Yashio

=== Video games ===
- BanG Dream! Girls Band Party! (2020-present) as Rui Yashio
