= Roland Juno-Gi =

Music workstation

- Manufacturer: Roland
- Dates: 2010–?

Technical specifications
- Synthesis type: sample-based Subtractive
- Aftertouch expression: No
- Velocity expression: Yes
- Storage memory: USB

Input/output
- External control: USB, MIDI

Roland Juno-Gi is a music workstation/synth introduced in 2010 by Roland Corporation. As an installment in the long-running Juno series, the synthesizer is the successor to the Juno-G.

== Features ==
The Juno-Gi is a 128-voice polyphony keyboard that contains about 1,300 sounds and an eight-track digital recorder with guitar, microphone and line inputs. USB memory, MIDI file format (SMF/MP3/WAV/AIFF), and D-Beam control are included.
