= Roland Juno-D =

Polyphonic synthesizer

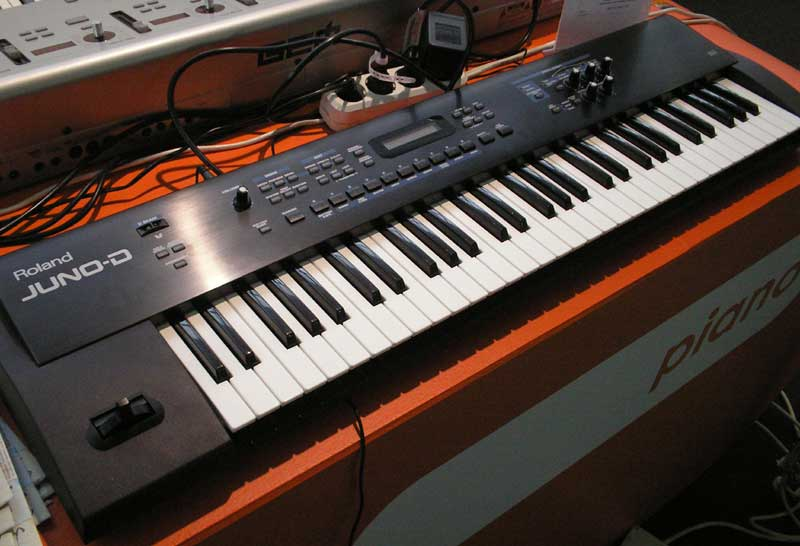
- Manufacturer: Roland
- Dates: 2005

Technical specifications
- Polyphony: 64 voices
- Synthesis type: sample-based Subtractive
- Aftertouch expression: No
- Velocity expression: Yes
- Effects: Multi-Effects: 47 types; Reverb: 8 types; Chorus: 8 types

Input/output
- External control: USB, MIDI

Roland Juno-D is a polyphonic synthesizer introduced in 2005 by Roland Corporation. It is based on the Fantom-X series, having a vintage design that resembles the previous Juno synthesizers, such as the Juno-106. Despite having similar names and introductions, the Juno-D was not intended to be succeeded by the Juno-G synthesizer, for they were both released concurrently. A Limited Edition was released.

== Features ==
Apart from the Juno name, the Juno-D carries distinctions from the other Juno installments, for the synthesizer has connection to Roland's RS PCM machines. The synthesizer utilizes General MIDI 2 (GM2), D-Beam control, and two optional pedal inputs. 768 Patch locations (128 user-programmable) are available for use, plus 22 Rhythm sets and 40 Performance memories. Of the preset patches, 384 are described as "Juno-D original" and 256 conform to the GM2 spec. Has 61 full size keys.
