= List of BanG Dream! live performances =

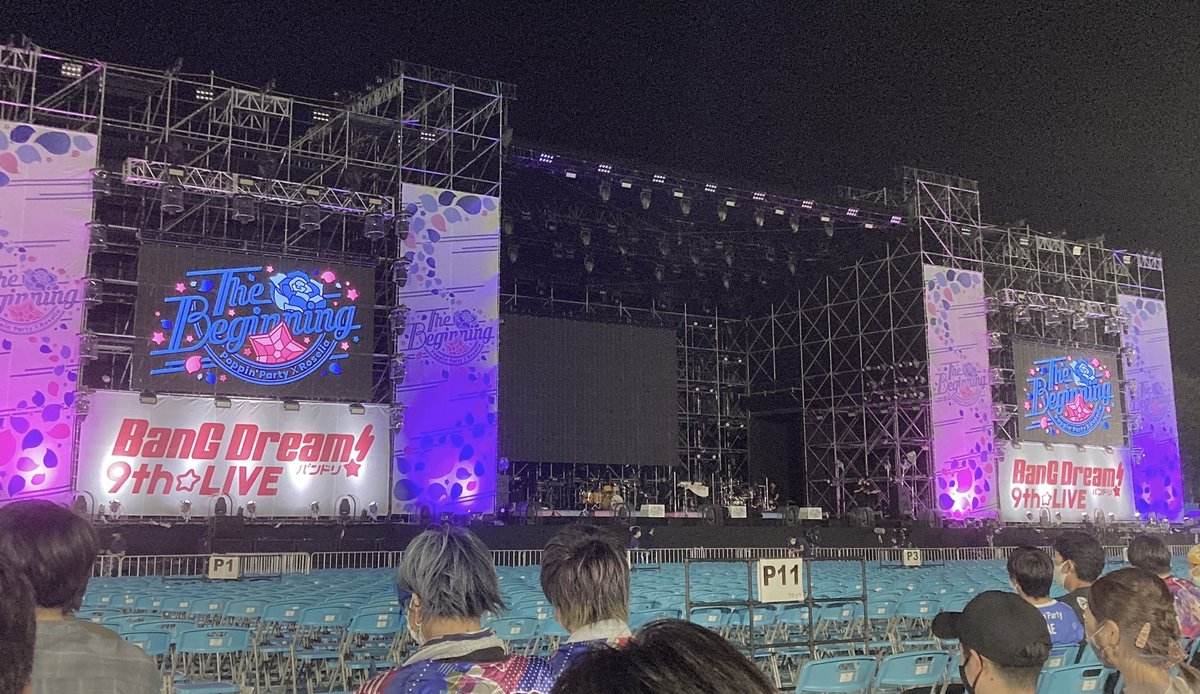
The stage for the BanG Dream! 9th Live's first concert, The Beginning by Poppin'Party and Roselia, at Fuji-Q Highland Conifer Forest on August 22, 2021

BanG Dream! is a Japanese music media franchise with the premise of all-female bands whose members are also voice actresses for the project's anime series and mobile game,BanG Dream! Girls Band Party!. As of 2021, the franchise consists of ten bands, seven of which perform live concerts: Poppin'Party (formed in 2015), Roselia (2017), Raise A Suilen (2018), Morfonica (2020), MyGO!!!!! (2022), Ave Mujica (2023) and Mugendai Mewtype (2023).

== Official concerts ==
=== 2015 ===
Title	Date	Venue	Performer(s)	Description
BanG_Dream! 1st Live: I started a band in spring!	April 18	Shimokitazawa Garden	Poppin'Party	Aimi (Kasumi Toyama), Rimi Nishimoto (Rimi Ushigome), and Ayasa Itō (Arisa Ichigaya) comprised the lineup. 11 of the 12 songs performed were cover versions of popular anime theme music, with the exception being "Yes! BanG_Dream!".
BanG_Dream! 2nd Live: Instruments × Girls = Justice!	June 14	Shinjuku Loft	Poppin'Party	The first show with the Poppin'Party name, Sae Ōtsuka made her debut as the band's guitarist Tae Hanazono.
BanG_Dream! 3rd Live: It's summer! Bang-A-Dream!	August 15	Duo Music Exchange	Poppin'Party	Summer-themed performance. Poppin'Party debuted the original song "Summer Skies & Sun! Sun! Seven!".
BanG_Dream! Kansai Live: BanG_Dream! Won't you come to Kobe?	September 26	Kobe Uwaya Gekijou	Poppin'Party	
Welcome! Poppin☆Party!!!!!	October 11	Differ Ariake	Poppin'Party	Ayaka Ōhashi joined Poppin'Party as the fifth and final member Sāya Yamabuki. The band debuted the song "Teardrops".

=== 2016 ===
Title	Date	Venue	Performer(s)	Description
BanG Dream! First Live Sprin'Party 2016!	April 24	Shinagawa Stellar Ball	Poppin'Party	First in-character concert under the rebooted BanG Dream! brand.
BanG Dream! 2nd LIVE Starrin'Party 2016!	November 13	Tokyo Dome City Hall	Poppin'Party	The first promotional video for the anime, along with other updates related to the show, was released.

=== 2017 ===
Title	Date	Venue	Performer(s)	Description
BanG Dream! 3rd Live Sparklin'Party 2017	February 5	Tokyo Dome City Hall	Poppin'Party	Roselia made its live debut as a surprise guest.
Roselia 1st Live Rosenlied	June 30	Duo Music Exchange	Roselia	Roselia's first standalone live.
Roselia 1st Live Rosenlied	July 29	Ariake Coliseum	Roselia	A second concert under the Rosenlied title was organized due to overwhelmingly positive reception to the first show.
BanG Dream! 4th Live Miracle Party 2017!	August 21	Nippon Budokan	Poppin'Party	Poppin'Party debuted the song "Time Lapse", which was released as the band's seventh single. Tickets were sold out prior to general sale, leading to Live Viewing Japan streaming the show in theaters.
Roselia 2nd Live Zeit	October 8	Makuhari Messe	Roselia	

=== 2018 ===
Title	Date	Venue	Performer(s)	Description
The Third 1st Live	March 25	Shimokitazawa Garden	The Third	The Third's (working name for Raise A Suilen) first standalone live. Initially composed of Raychell, Natsume, and Reo Kurachi, the band introduced Riko Kohara during the show. Ōtsuka was a guest performer.
BanG Dream! 5th Live	May 12	Makuhari Messe	Poppin'Party	Subtitled Happy Party 2018!. The Third was the opening act for both days.
BanG Dream! 5th Live	May 13	Makuhari Messe	Roselia	Subtitled -Ewigkeit-. The show was Yurika Endō's final performance as Lisa Imai, and Yuki Nakashima debuted as her replacement during the encore.
The Third 2nd Live	July 7	Akasaka Blitz	The Third	The Third was formally renamed Raise A Suilen, while Risa Tsumugi joined the band.
Vier	November 7	Shinagawa Stellar Ball	Roselia	A four-member performance after Satomi Akesaka's (Rinko Shirokane) departure. Kanon Shizaki made her debut as Akesaka's successor.
BanG Dream! 6th Live	December 7	Ryōgoku Kokugikan	Raise A Suilen	Subtitled Brave New World. Raise A Suilen's characters for the anime were revealed. Roselia was the opening act and Miku Itō (Kokoro Tsumuraki) was a guest performer.
BanG Dream! 6th Live	December 8	Ryōgoku Kokugikan	Poppin'Party	Subtitled Let's Go! Poppin'Party!.

=== 2019 ===
Title	Date	Venue	Performer(s)	Description
BanG Dream! 7th Live	February 21	Nippon Budokan	Roselia	Subtitled Hitze.
BanG Dream! 7th Live	February 22	Nippon Budokan	Raise A Suilen	Subtitled Genesis. Itō, Ami Maeshima (Aya Maruyama), Sachika Misawa (Moca Aoba), Suzuko Mimori (Yuri Ushigome), and Argonavis were guest performers.
BanG Dream! 7th Live	February 23	Nippon Budokan	Poppin'Party	Subtitled Jumpin' Music.
Heaven and Earth	July 13–14	World Memorial Hall	Raise A Suilen	Ōtsuka was a guest performer on the first day, while Itō and Maeshima appeared at the second.
Flame/Wasser	August 3–4	Fuji-Q Highland Conifer Forest	Roselia	Subtitled Flamme (August 3) and Wasser (August 4).
Rausch und/and Craziness	November 30–December 1	Makuhari Messe	Roselia; Raise A Suilen	
The Creation: We are Raise A Suilen	December 29	Line Cube Shibuya	Raise A Suilen	RAS debuted a new original song "Soul Soldier".

=== 2020 ===
Title	Date	Venue	Performer(s)	Description
Pastel Palettes Special Live: Manmaru Oyamani Irodori Special	January 27	Zepp Tokyo	Ami Maeshima	Pastel Palettes' first live show. Fellow band members Sawako Hata (Eve Wakamiya) and Ikumi Nakagami (Maya Yamato) made guest appearances.
Rausch und/and Craziness	February 1	Musashino Forest Sport Plaza	Roselia	Subtitled Rausch.
Rausch und/and Craziness	February 9	Ecopa Arena	Raise A Suilen	Subtitled Craziness.
BanG Dream! 8th Live Summer Outdoors 3DAYS	August 21	Fuji-Q Highland Conifer Forest	Roselia	Subtitled Einheit. Merm4id of D4DJ served as the opening act.
BanG Dream! 8th Live Summer Outdoors 3DAYS	August 22	Fuji-Q Highland Conifer Forest	Raise A Suilen	Subtitled The Depths. Happy Around! of D4DJ was the opening act.
BanG Dream! 8th Live Summer Outdoors 3DAYS	August 23	Fuji-Q Highland Conifer Forest	Morfonica; Ami Maeshima with Raise A Suilen; Poppin'Party	Subtitled Special Live: Summerly Tone. Sumire Uesaka (Chisato Shirasagi) was a guest performer with Maeshima.
Cantabile	October 7	Tokyo Garden Theater	Morfonica	Morfonica's first standalone live. The band debuted their single "Bloom Bloom".
BanG Dream! 8th Live Breakthrough!	October 8–9	Tokyo Garden Theater	Poppin'Party	Subtitled Kirakira Festa Day! (October 8) and Dokidoki Special Day! (October 9).
Rausch und/and Craziness: Interlude	December 12	Online	Roselia; Raise A Suilen	

=== 2021 ===
Title	Date	Venue	Performer(s)	Description
Rausch und/and Craziness II	February 22	Yokohama Arena	Roselia; Raise A Suilen	
Friendship Live "Astral Harmony"	February 23	Yokohama Arena	Poppin'Party; Morfonica	
Andante	May 21	Zepp Haneda	Morfonica	
Pastel Palettes Special Live "Title Dream"	July 8	Zepp Haneda	Ami Maeshima	Fellow band members Sumire Uesaka (Chisato Shirasagi), Sawako Hata (Eve Wakamiya), and Ikumi Nakagami (Maya Yamato) made surprise guest appearances.
BanG Dream! 9th Live	August 21–22	Fuji-Q Highland Conifer Forest	Poppin'Party; Roselia	Subtitled The Beginning.
BanG Dream! 9th Live	September 4–5	Fuji-Q Highland Conifer Forest	Raise A Suilen; Morfonica	Subtitled Mythology.
Edelstein	December 11–12	Nagoya Congress Center Century Hall	Roselia	First day subtitled Weißklee, second day Rose. Argonavis' Masahiro Itō and Daisuke Hyūga were the opening act for the second day.

=== 2022 ===
Title	Date	Venue	Performer(s)	Description
Repaint	February 7	Zepp DiverCity	Raise A Suilen	Fear, and Loathing in Las Vegas was a guest performer.
Resonance	April 4	Tokyo Dome City Hall	Morfonica	Bassist Yūka Nishio did not perform after testing positive for COVID-19.
Episode of Roselia	May 21–22	Fuji-Q Highland Conifer Forest	Roselia	
Mythology Chapter 2	June 18	Fuji-Q Highland Conifer Forest	Raise A Suilen; Morfonica	
Overkill	June 19	Fuji-Q Highland Conifer Forest	Raise A Suilen	
BanG Dream! 10th☆LIVE	September 22	Ariake Arena	Roselia	
BanG Dream! 10th☆LIVE	September 23	Ariake Arena	Morfonica	
BanG Dream! 10th☆LIVE	September 24	Ariake Arena	Poppin'Party	
BanG Dream! 10th☆LIVE	September 25	Ariake Arena	Raise A Suilen	
BanG Dream! Special Live Girls Band Party! 2020→2022	November 12	MetLife Dome	Poppin'Party; Roselia; Raise A Suilen; Morfonica; Ayane Sakura; Miku Itō	Postponed twice due to the COVID-19 pandemic. Initially scheduled for May 3, 2020 followed by June 5–6, 2021. Maeshima did not take part for health reasons. Blu-ray will be released on July 26, 2023.

=== 2023 ===
Title	Date	Venue	Opening Act	Performer(s)	Description
BanG Dream! 11th☆LIVE	February 4	Ariake Arena	MyGo!!!!!	Poppin'Party Raise A Suilen	Subtitled GALAXY to GALAXY.
BanG Dream! 11th☆LIVE	February 5	Ariake Arena	MyGo!!!!!	Roselia Morfonica	Subtitled Sternenzelt Nocturne.
MyGO!!!!! 4th LIVE	April 9	Tachikawa Stage Garden	MyGo!!!!!		
Popipan! no Odekake in SUMMER	August 11	Yamano Hall	SHINJUCK BANG BANG GIRLS	Poppin'Party	
MyGO!!!!! 5th LIVE	August 12	KT Zepp Yokohama	MyGo!!!!!		
Roselia "Farbe"	August 16	Ariake Arena	MyGo!!!!!	Roselia	
Roselia "Farbe"	August 17	Ariake Arena	Ave Mujica	Roselia	
BanG Dream! 12th☆LIVE	November 3	Tokyo Garden Theater	Poppin'Party		Each day had their own subtitle depending on the band
BanG Dream! 12th☆LIVE	November 4	Tokyo Garden Theater	MyGo!!!!!		Each day had their own subtitle depending on the band
BanG Dream! 12th☆LIVE	November 5	Tokyo Garden Theater	Raise A Suilen		Each day had their own subtitle depending on the band

=== 2024 ===
Title	Date	Venue	Performer(s)	Description
Ave Mujica 1st LIVE "Perdere Omnia"	January 27	Yokosuka Arts Theater	Ave Mujica	
Divide/Unite	April 29	Yokohama Arena	Poppin'Party MyGo!!!!!	
Ave Mujica 2nd LIVE「Quaerere Lumina」	June 8	Kanagawa Kenmin Hall	Ave Mujica	
Ave Mujica 2nd LIVE「Quaerere Lumina」	July 7	Aichi Prefectural Art Theater	Ave Mujica	
Raise A Suilen Live 2024 "ESSENTIALS"	June 15	Tokyo Garden Theater	Raise A Suilen	
Raise A Suilen Live 2024 "ESSENTIALS"	June 16	Tokyo Garden Theater	Raise A Suilen	
MyGO!!!!! 6th LIVE	July 27	Musashino Forest Sports Plaza	MyGo!!!!!	The additional show in Shanghai was planned after the original performance was announced.
MyGO!!!!! 6th LIVE	July 28	Musashino Forest Sports Plaza	MyGo!!!!!	The additional show in Shanghai was planned after the original performance was announced.
MyGO!!!!! 6th LIVE	September 21	National Exhibition and Convention Center (Shanghai)	MyGo!!!!!	The additional show in Shanghai was planned after the original performance was announced.
Mugendai Mewtype 1st LIVE "Metamorphose"	August 24	1000 Club	Mugendai Mewtype	
Ave Mujica 3rd LIVE"Veritas"	October 13	Kawaguchiko Stellar Theater	Ave Mujica	
Poppin'Party LIVE 2024 "Poppin'Canvas ~Geijutsu no Aki, Ongaku no Aki!~"	October 14	Kawaguchiko Stellar Theater	Poppin'Party	

== Concert tours ==
Title	Venue	Date	Performer(s)	Description
Raise A Suilen Zepp Tour 2021 "Be Light"	Zepp Haneda	May 22, 2021	Raise A Suilen	Main tour held from May to June. Encore took place in November and December.
Raise A Suilen Zepp Tour 2021 "Be Light"	Zepp Nagoya	June 2, 2021	Raise A Suilen	Main tour held from May to June. Encore took place in November and December.
Raise A Suilen Zepp Tour 2021 "Be Light"	Zepp Namba	June 30, 2021	Raise A Suilen	Main tour held from May to June. Encore took place in November and December.
Raise A Suilen Zepp Tour 2021 "Be Light"	Zepp Sapporo	November 12, 2021	Raise A Suilen	Main tour held from May to June. Encore took place in November and December.
Raise A Suilen Zepp Tour 2021 "Be Light"	Zepp Fukuoka	November 26, 2021	Raise A Suilen	Main tour held from May to June. Encore took place in November and December.
Raise A Suilen Zepp Tour 2021 "Be Light"	KT Zepp Yokohama	December 4	Raise A Suilen	Main tour held from May to June. Encore took place in November and December.
Kasumi and Tae's Stay After School Tour	Zepp Namba	October 17, 2021	Aimi; Sae Ōtsuka	Acoustic music tour.
Kasumi and Tae's Stay After School Tour	Zepp Nagoya	November 7, 2021	Aimi; Sae Ōtsuka	Acoustic music tour.
Kasumi and Tae's Stay After School Tour	Zepp Yokohama	November 17, 2021	Aimi; Sae Ōtsuka	Acoustic music tour.
Morfonica Zepp Tour 2021 "Amabile"	Zepp Osaka Bayside	October 28, 2021	Morfonica	
Morfonica Zepp Tour 2021 "Amabile"	Zepp Haneda	November 5, 2021	Morfonica	
Morfonica Zepp Tour 2023 "forte"	July 20	Zepp Osaka Bayside	Morfonica	
Morfonica Zepp Tour 2023 "forte"	September 6	Zepp Nagoya	Morfonica	
Morfonica Zepp Tour 2023 "forte"	October 5	Zepp Haneda	Morfonica	
MyGo!!!!! Zepp Tour 2024 "Wandering Desire"	February 12	Zepp Haneda	MyGo!!!!!	
MyGo!!!!! Zepp Tour 2024 "Wandering Desire"	March 19	Zepp Fukuoka	MyGo!!!!!	
MyGo!!!!! Zepp Tour 2024 "Wandering Desire"	March 22	Zepp Osaka Bayside	MyGo!!!!!	
MyGo!!!!! Zepp Tour 2024 "Wandering Desire"	April 11	Zepp Nagoya	MyGo!!!!!	
Raise A Suilen Asia Tour 2024	March 23	Zepp New Taipei	Raise A Suilen	
Raise A Suilen Asia Tour 2024	March 30	Shanghai Grand Theatre	Raise A Suilen	
Raise A Suilen Asia Tour 2024	March 31	Shanghai Grand Theatre	Raise A Suilen	

== Collaborations and guest appearances ==
Show	Date	Venue	Performer(s)	Description
Animelo Summer Live 2016	August 27, 2016	Saitama Super Arena	Poppin'Party	Poppin'Party performed on the second day and played "Yes! BanG_Dream!" and "Star Beat!".
Animelo Summer Live 2017	August 25, 2017	Saitama Super Arena	Roselia	Roselia performed on the first day and played "Black Shout" and "Louder".
Animax Musix 2018 Osaka	March 3, 2018	Osaka Castle Hall	Poppin'Party	Collaboration with OxT for a cover of OxT vocalist Masayoshi Ōishi's song "Kimi Ja Nakya Dame Mitai".
Rock in Japan Festival 2019	August 11, 2019	Hitachi Seaside Park	Poppin'Party	Poppin'Party performed on the Buzz Stage.
Animelo Summer Live 2018	August 24, 2018	Saitama Super Arena	Poppin'Party	Poppin'Party performed on the first day and played "Tear Drops", "Sparkling Dreaming ~Sing Girls~", and a cover of "God Knows" from Haruhi Suzumiya. Ōtsuka and Nishimoto partnered with Maon Kurosaki and Luna Haruna to cover "Shunkan Sentimental" from Fullmetal Alchemist: Brotherhood.
No Girl No Cry	May 18–19, 2019	MetLife Dome	Poppin'Party	A Battle of the Bands-style concert with Silent Siren.
D4DJ 1st Live	July 21, 2019	Makuhari Messe	Raise A Suilen	Collaboration with D4DJ, a fellow Bushiroad property.
Animelo Summer Live 2019	August 30–September 1, 2019	Saitama Super Arena	Poppin'Party, Roselia, Raise A Suilen	Roselia performed on the first day with "Louder", "Black Shout", and "Brave Jewel" followed by a cover of "This game" with Konomi Suzuki. RAS performed "Unstoppable" and "World Wide Treasure!" on the second day, the latter in collaboration with Miku Itō and Tomoyo Kurosawa (Michelle). On the third day, Poppin'Party played "Teardrops" with the festival band, "Star Beat!", and "Kizuna Music".
Aso Rock Festival	September 29, 2019	Mikuni World Stadium Kitakyushu	Raise A Suilen	
Mag Rock Festival	October 5, 2019	Shimizu Marine Park	Raise A Suilen	Guest appearance on the first day.
Animax Musix 2019 Kobe	October 26, 2019	World Memorial Hall	Raise A Suilen	
No Girl No Cry -Round 2-	March 27, 2021	Zepp Tokyo	Poppin'Party	Second collaboration with Silent Siren.
Animax Musix 2021	November 20, 2021	Yokohama Arena	Poppin'Party; Roselia	
Rock in Japan Festival 2022	August 13, 2022	Soga Sports Park	Raise A Suilen	
Summer Sonic Festival 2022	August 20, 2022	Zozo Marine Stadium	Raise A Suilen	
Avoid Note	January 12, 2025	Tokyo Dome City Hall	MyGO!!!!!	Collaboration with TOGENASHI TOGEARI from Girls Band Cry.
RAISE MY CATHARSIS	December 7, 2025	Keiho Arena Tokyo	RAISE A SUILEN	Collaboration with TOGENASHI TOGEARI from Girls Band Cry.
