= Ruka Fukagawa =

Japanese singer and voice actress

- 深川 瑠華
- Born: 6 September 2004 (age 21); Kanagawa Prefecture, Japan
- Occupations: Actress; singer
- Years active: 2020–present
- Employer: Hibiki
- Notable work: D4DJ as Kurumi Shiratori; Revue Starlight as Ryoko Kobato
- Musical career
- Member of: Lyrical Lily; Siegfeld Institute of Music Junior High

Ruka Fukagawa (Japanese: 深川 瑠華, Hepburn: Fukagawa Ruka; born 6 September 2004) is a Japanese singer and voice actress affiliated with Hibiki. She started her career portraying Kurumi Shiratori as part of Lyrical Lily, one of the musical groups in Bushiroad's D4DJ franchise. She also portrays Ryoko Kobato in Revue Starlight, another Bushiroad franchise.

== Biography ==
Ruka Fukagawa was born on 6 September 2004 in Kanagawa Prefecture and raised in Tokyo.

In April 2020, Fukagawa became part of Bushiroad's D4DJ franchise as Kurumi Shiratori, one of the four members of Lyrical Lily; the same month, she and her Lyrical Lily co-star Yuzuki Watase joined Bushiroad's talent agency Hibiki. She voiced the character in D4DJ Groovy Mix (2020), D4DJ Petit Mix (2021), and D4DJ All Mix (2023). She also reprised her role in the stage productions Senri! no Michi mo Ippo Kara and Arisugawa Gakuin Cultural Festival Live Stage.

She also voices Ryoko Kobato in the game Revue Starlight: Re LIVE (also part of a Bushiroad franchise), and she portrayed her in the Revue Starlight stage plays The LIVE Edel Delight (2022) and The STAGE Chūtō-bu Rebellion (2023). She is part of Siegfeld Institute of Music Junior High, a voice acting unit that she appeared in for the musicals, and two of their singles charted in the top 40 of the Oricon Singles Chart: Regalia: Keishō/Afuregu! Aufregendes Leben (2022) and Rebellion/Yumemiro (2023).

In 2023, she was cast as Flasher in Azur Lane. She also voices minor characters in the games Assault Lily Last Bullet, Brown Dust, and Lost Decade.

== Filmography ==
=== Animated television ===
2021

- D4DJ Petit Mix, Kurumi Shiratori

2023

- D4DJ All Mix, Kurumi Shiratori

=== Video games ===
- D4DJ Groovy Mix (2020), Kurumi Shiratori
- Brown Dust (2021), Joy
- Lost Decade, Gloria
- Assault Lily Last Bullet, injured Lily, etc.
- Revue Starlight: Re LIVE (2022), Ryoko Kobato
- Azur Lane (2023), Flasher

=== Stage ===
2020

- Reading Party Vol. 8, Mio Tomioka/Rumi Kamisato

2021

- Hakoniwa Dōsōkai, Nana Komori
- Satorare: The Reading

2022

- Butai Lyrical Lily: Senri! no Michi mo Ippo Kara, Kurumi Shiratori
- Revue Starlight: The LIVE Edel Delight, Ryoko Kobato

2023

- Butai D4DJ: Arisugawa Gakuin Cultural Festival Live Stage, Kurumi Shiratori
- Matching Appli: Apple Bomb (Kari), Kū
- Revue Starlight: The STAGE Chūtō-bu Rebellion, Ryoko Kobato
