= Raise A Suilen =

Japanese band

- RAISE A SUILEN members from left to right: PAREO, MASKING, LAYER, CHU², LOCK

Background information
- Origin: Japan
- Genres: Electronicore; anime song; dubstep; electronica; rap metal
- Years active: 2018–present
- Label: Bushiroad Music
- Spinoff of: BanG Dream!
- Members: Raychell (Rei Wakana); Natsume (Masuki Satō); Riko Kohara (Rokka Asahi); Reo Kurachi (Reona Nyūbara); Risa Tsumugi (Chiyu Tamade)
- Website: en.bang-dream.com/artists/raise-a-suilen/

Raise A Suilen (stylized as RAISE A SUILEN) is a Japanese all-female rock band that is part of Bushiroad's media franchise BanG Dream!. Formed in 2018, the group's members portray fictional characters in the project's anime series and mobile game BanG Dream! Girls Band Party! in addition to performing their characters' respective instruments in live concerts.

Raise A Suilen consists of Raychell (vocals, bass guitar), Riko Kohara (guitar), Natsume (drums), Reo Kurachi (keyboards, vocals), and Risa Tsumugi (DJ, vocals). In-universe, the band is represented by Rei Wakana (Raychell), Rokka Asahi (Kohara), Chiyu Tamade (Tsumugi), Masuki Satō (Natsume), and Reona Nyūbara (Kurachi).

Of the twelve bands in BanG Dream!, Raise A Suilen is one of seven whose members perform their own music. The group has produced eleven singles, a mini-album and their first album was released on August 19, 2020.

== History ==
=== Early history (2018–2019) ===
Logo as The Third (Beta)

Raise A Suilen started as a backup band that performed music for the in-universe bands whose members are unable to play their own instruments. In a 2018 interview with Real Sound, franchise creator and Bushiroad head Takaaki Kidani explained he was reluctant to hire a male backup band for an all-female franchise, prompting the group's formation. Kidani envisioned the band as a female version of One Ok Rock and provided them with more freedom in playing music for non-Bushiroad properties than fellow BanG Dream! groups Poppin'Party and Roselia.

The group debuted with Raychell, Natsume, Kurachi, and Poppin'Party guitarist Sae Ōtsuka in the Garupa Live and Garupa Party! at Tokyo Big Sight on January 13–14, 2018, where they filled the instrumentals for Afterglow, Hello, Happy World!, and Pastel Palettes. The band was formally announced as a standalone unit during the event's second day; they were initially named The Third (Beta) as the third live-action music group in the franchise after Poppin'Party and Roselia.

Their first live concert, known as The Third (Beta) 1st Live, took place on March 25 at Shimokitazawa Garden with Raychell, Natsume, and Kurachi; Ōtsuka was a guest performer and played with the group for the first nine songs, which were pre-existing pieces from the BanG Dream! franchise. Kohara was introduced as the band's permanent guitarist for their original track "R・I・O・T". It would be released as the band's debut single on December 12 as part of a triple-release day for the franchise along with Poppin'Party and Roselia's respective singles; "R・I・O・T" peaked at sixth on the Oricon Weekly Singles Chart. "R・I・O・T"'s B-side "Unstoppable" was later used as ending theme music for the 2018 anime Cardfight!! Vanguard. The music from the live was compiled into an album and released on September 26.

On May 12, 2018, The Third served as the opening act for the BanG Dream! 5th Live at Makuhari Messe. Tsumugi joined the band at their second live at Akasaka Blitz on July 17, where they were formally renamed Raise A Suilen. A "suilen" (垂簾) is a bamboo screen, and the name alludes to "raising the screen" for performances. In November, the band participated in its first overseas performance at CharaExpo USA in Anaheim, California, with Poppin'Party and Roselia. Raise A Suilen's first official concert with the new name and full lineup, titled Brave New World, took place on December 7 in the BanG Dream! 6th Live at Ryōgoku Kokugikan.

The band's second single "A Declaration of ×××" came out on February 20, 2019, as part of a six-single release by the franchise (each band released a song). Every single appeared on the Oricon Daily Chart for February 19, with Raise A Suilen's ranking eighth. Two days later, the band played in the BanG Dream! 7th Live at the Nippon Budokan, where their Genesis show was supported by Hello, Happy World!'s Miku Itō, Pastel Palettes' Ami Maeshima, Afterglow's Sachika Misawa, Glitter Green's Suzuko Mimori, and the franchise's male-centric group Argonavis. On June 19, RAS released their third single "Invincible Fighter"; the single's self-titled track and B-side "Takin' My Heart" were used as theme music for the anime Cardfight!! Vanguard: High School Arc Cont..

RAS held their first standalone show, called Heaven and Earth, on July 13–14, 2019 at World Memorial Hall. Itō, Maeshima, and Ōtsuka made guest appearances at the live. The band would also have guest performances of their own during the year, appearing at the debut live for fellow Bushiroad franchise D4DJ on July 21, Animelo Summer Live on August 31, Aso Rock Festival on September 29, and Mag Rock Festival and Animax Musix 2019 Kobe on October 5 and 26. On November 30–December 1, Raise A Suilen partnered with Roselia for the joint concert Rausch und/and Craziness at Makuhari Messe; a second Craziness live by RAS took place at Ecopa Arena on February 9, 2020. The Creation: We are Raise A Suilen, the band's second solo live, was conducted at Line Cube Shibuya on December 29, 2019.

"Drive Us Crazy", their fourth single, was released on January 22, 2020; it reached fifth on the Oricon Weekly Chart and ended the year as Billboard Japan's 97th-best-selling single of 2020. In April, Tsumugi and Kurachi began hosting the franchise-centric variety show Radio R･I･O･T. A stage play by the band's members called We are Raise A Suilen -BanG Dream! The Stage- took place from July 15 to 19 at the Tennozu Galaxy Theater with nine shows; due to the COVID-19 pandemic, unused tickets were refunded and performances were streamed online. A total of 10,064 watched the nine performances at the theater or via live stream.

=== First album and stage play (2020–present) ===
Raise A Suilen's first album Era was released on August 19, 2020; after topping the Oricon Daily Chart for August 18 with 15,420 sales, it ranked second on the Weekly Albums Chart. Era also ranked 86th on Billboard Japan's best-selling albums of 2020 and 94th on its Hot Albums of the year. Later in the week on August 22 and 23, the band performed on the second and third days of the BanG Dream! 8th Live, respectively titled The Depths and Special Live: Summerly Tone, at Fuji-Q Highland Conifer Forest. The Depths saw the band perform every song from Era and debut the new song "Sacred world". At Special Live: Summerly Tone, RAS was the backing band for Pastel Palettes' Ami Maeshima, and the show concluded with Raychell and Roselia's Aina Aiba joining Poppin'Party for the encore. "Sacred world", released as the band's fifth single on October 21, is used as the opening theme song for the show Assault Lily Bouquet; the single's coupling tracks "Reigning" and "R・I・O・T" are renditions from The Stage.

A sequel show to Rausch und/and Craziness was held at Yokohama Arena on February 22, 2021, with an online show known as Rausch und/and Craziness -interlude- taking place on December 12, 2020. The band's sixth single "mind of Prominence" was released on January 27, 2021. The two songs on RAS' April 21-bound seventh single "Exist"—the titular track and "Embrace of light"—were featured as theme music for Bushiroad's Joran: The Princess of Snow and Blood. In May and June, the band held its first concert tour, known as Raise A Suilen Zepp Tour 2021 "Be Light", with three shows at Zepp Haneda (May 22), Zepp Nagoya (June 2), and Zepp Namba (June 30); an encore tour took place at Zepp Sapporo (November 12), Zepp Fukuoka (November 26), and KT Zepp Yokohama (December 4). RAS and Morfonica performed at the BanG Dream! 9th Live, subtitled Mythology, at Fuji-Q Highland Conifer Forest on September 4–5. The band's eighth single "Domination to world" came out later that month.

RAS' Repaint show was held on February 7, 2022, at Zepp DiverCity. Fear, and Loathing in Las Vegas was a guest act, and the two groups also collaborated for a song of the same name that was composed by FALILV and performed by RAS. "Repaint" was released digitally on February 26 and was included on the band's ninth single "Coruscate -DNA-", which was released on April 27. A sequel to Mythology came on June 18 followed by a solo performance Overkill the next day, both at Fuji-Q Highland Conifer Forest. The band also performed at Rock in Japan Festival 2022 at Soga Sports Park on August 13, followed by the Summer Sonic Festival at Zozo Marine Stadium a week later.

Raise A Suilen released its first mini album ''REVELATION'' in 2023. The album released songs that were more individually about the 5 members of the band and yet kept the unique musical character of the band.

The band has published their second full-length album called 'SAVAGE' in 2024. During the interview with Gekirock, members Raychell, Reo Kurachi and Risa Tsumugi shared their thoughts about the album and the songs, and about how the band is playing live.

== Members ==
- Raychell (Rei Wakana/Layer, vocals/bass guitar): Prior to BanG Dream!, Raychell had no voice acting experience but was a radio host and live-action actress. From 2010 to 2013, she was a solo singer under the moniker "Lay". In 2017, she performed the ending theme song to Bushiroad's Cardfight!! Vanguard G: NEXT and was approached by Kidani about joining the backup band for BanG Dream!'s groups. She had been acquainted with Natsume and Ōtsuka before BanG Dream! as colleagues at the Ace Crew Entertainment talent agency, and had played Girls Band Party! since its release. Raychell commented in a 2020 interview with Real Sound that she had considered quitting singing before being recruited for Raise A Suilen, adding that she felt she was "really saved" by the franchise.
- Riko Kohara (Rokka Asahi/Lock, guitar): Kohara joined the band at The Third (Beta) 1st Live; she was scouted by Kidani when a supporter sent him a video of her playing guitar on social media, and was a Poppin'Party fan prior to joining the franchise. She picked up the instrument when she was 18 years old and attended a music school, while her interest in voice acting began in high school. She was a member of The Sketchbook, a band based on the fictional group from the anime Sket Dance, from 2011 until its disbandment in 2015. Rokka's background is modeled after Kohara's as the two moved from Gifu Prefecture to Tokyo to pursue musical careers, while the character's birthday (July 17) is the same day as The Third's second live where it was renamed Raise A Suilen.
- Natsume (Masuki Satō/Masking, drums): Masuki was Natsume's debut role as a voice actress. She began drumming in high school after being invited to perform with the school band, and later attended the vocational school ESP Gakuen where she formed a band with her classmates. After playing in the backup band for the festival A-Nation, she performed at Bushiroad's tenth anniversary concert and was recruited by Kidani to join BanG Dream! When she first portrayed Masuki for the anime's second season, Natsume spoke in a lower tone under the impression that her character suppresses her emotions, but became more expressive in the third season as Masuki's character develops.
- Reo Kurachi (Reona Nyūbara/Pareo, vocals/keyboards): Kurachi learned to play the piano during her youth, while her interest in voice acting began in junior high school after watching the anime K-On! and Fullmetal Alchemist. She entered the voice acting industry in 2016 with S Inc., while BanG Dream! 2nd Season was her first role in a television series.
- Risa Tsumugi (Chiyu Tamade/CHU2, DJ/rap): Tsumugi joined Raise A Suilen at their second live. She began voice acting after hearing Aya Hirano's performance in the Haruhi Suzumiya series, while she had no disc jockeying or rapping experience prior to Raise A Suilen. As Tsumugi is fluent in English due to her overseas education, Kidani described her as a major asset in helping BanG Dream! grow internationally; Chiyu is also bilingual and regularly includes English words in her speech.

== In-universe band ==
Wordmark of the band

Raise A Suilen's fictional counterparts were revealed at the BanG Dream! 6th Live. The characters' personalities and backgrounds were created from interviews between the voice actresses and the anime's staff. The band is described by anime streaming service HIDIVE as an "eclectic blend of aesthetics that reflects the mad mix of styles found in their infectious music", which includes the use of electronic rock themes in their songs.

The group first appears in the anime's second season. After her offer to become Roselia's producer is rejected, Chiyu Tamade forms Raise A Suilen to get her revenge, which includes trying to recruit Tae Hanazono from the lead group Poppin'Party. RAS becomes a main band in the third season as they enter the BanG Dream! Girls Band Challenge. The group was added to the BanG Dream! Girls Band Party! mobile game on June 10, 2020.

A manga series focusing on RAS titled RAiSe! The story of my music began serialization in Monthly Bushiroad in January 2019. Kō Nakamura and Ryū Shihara wrote and illustrated the manga, respectively.

== Discography ==
The band's songs are composed and arranged by Elements Garden.

=== Singles ===
Year	Title	Coupling track (Note: Instrumental versions of both songs are also included.)	Release date	Peak Oricon chart position	Notes	Ref
2018	"R・I・O・T"	"Unstoppable" (Note: Officially stylized in all caps)	December 12	6		
2019	"A Declaration of ×××"	"Expose 'Burn Out!!!'"	February 20	10		
2019	"Invincible Fighter"	"Takin' My Heart"	June 19	7		
2020	"Drive Us Crazy"	"Hell! or Hell?"	January 22	5		
2020	"Sacred World"	"Reigning ~The Stage ver.~", "R・I・O・T ~The Stage ver.~"	October 21	6		
2021	"Mind of Prominence"	"Just the Way I Am"	January 27	3		
2021	"Exist"	"Embrace of Light", "Outsider Rodeo"	April 21	4		
2021	"Domination to World"	"Shakunetsu Bonfire!" (灼熱 Bonfire!)	September 29	9		
2022	"Coruscate -DNA-"	"Repaint", "Light a fire", "Just Awake" (A version), "Keep the Heat and Fire Yourself Up" (B version)	April 27	7	Two versions were released with different cover songs.	
2022	"The Way of Life"	"Dead Heat Beat"	November 30	10		
2023	"-Nemesis-"	"EXPOSE 'Burn out!!!' – English Ver.", "Takin' my Heart – English Ver."	June 28	13	Featuring two English versions of previous songs.	
2025	"Bad Kids All Bet"	"Welcome to Pandemonium"	January 8	8		
2025	"Howling Ambition"	"Vivid First Time"	June 11	11		
2025	"Fight Addict" (Note: The title of the song is stylized as 'Fight' Addict.)	"Five as One", "Drown Out the Noise and Push Through the Trash"	November 12	11	Featuring an original song composed by Fear, and Loathing in Las Vegas	
2026	"What an Explosion"	"Runaway Star"	June 10	10		

=== Albums ===
Year	Title	Release date	Peak Oricon chart position	Notes	Ref
2018	"The Third (Beta) 1st Live" (THE THIRD（仮）1st ライブ)	September 26	17	Recorded at their first live	
2019	BanG Dream! Girls Band Party! Cover Collection Vol. 3 (バンドリ！ ガールズバンドパーティ！ カバーコレクション Vol.3)	December 18	4	Joined by Poppin'Party, Roselia, Afterglow, Pastel Palettes, and Hello, Happy World! (Note: Joined by Morfonica in Volume 4)	
2020	BanG Dream! Girls Band Party! Cover Collection Vol. 4 (バンドリ！ ガールズバンドパーティ！ カバーコレクション Vol.4)	May 27	1	Joined by Poppin'Party, Roselia, Afterglow, Pastel Palettes, and Hello, Happy World!	
2020	Era	August 19	2		
2020	Garupa Vocaloid Cover Collection (ガルパ ボカロカバーコレクション)	December 16	4	Joined by Poppin'Party, Roselia, Afterglow, Pastel Palettes, Hello, Happy World!, and Morfonica	
2021	BanG Dream! Girls Band Party! Cover Collection Vol. 5 (バンドリ！ ガールズバンドパーティ！ カバーコレクションVol.5)	February 24	6	Joined by Poppin'Party, Roselia, Afterglow, Pastel Palettes, Hello, Happy World!, and Morfonica	
2021	"BanG Dream! FILM LIVE 2nd Stage" Special Songs	August 25	13	Joined by Poppin'Party, Roselia, Afterglow, Pastel Palettes, Hello, Happy World!, and Morfonica	
2021	BanG Dream! Girls Band Party! Cover Collection Vol. 6 (バンドリ！ ガールズバンドパーティ！ カバーコレクションVol.6)	November 10	4	Joined by Poppin'Party, Roselia, Afterglow, Pastel Palettes, Hello, Happy World!, and Morfonica	
2022	BanG Dream! Dreamer's Best	March 16	6	Fan vote-determined compilation album with RAS' "EXPOSE 'Burn out!!!'", "Beautiful Birthday", and "HELL! or HELL?" included	
2022	BanG Dream! Girls Band Party! Cover Collection Vol. 7 (バンドリ！ ガールズバンドパーティ！ カバーコレクションVol.7)	December 14	13	Joined by Poppin'Party, Roselia, Afterglow, Pastel Palettes, Hello, Happy World!, and Morfonica	
2023	BanG Dream! Girls Band Party! Cover Collection Vol.8 (バンドリ！ ガールズバンドパーティ！ カバーコレクションVol.8)	September 6	21	Joined by Poppin'Party, Roselia, Afterglow, Pastel Palettes, Hello, Happy World!, and Morfonica, Includes tie-up songs featuring Konomi Suzuki, FLOW, ClariS, Kanako Itō, Machico, Fhána, and MYTH & ROID	
2024	Savage	June 12	10		
2024	BanG Dream! Girls Band Party! Cover Collection Vol.9 (バンドリ！ ガールズバンドパーティ！ カバーコレクションVol.9)	October 30	13	Joined by Poppin'Party, Roselia, Afterglow, Pastel Palettes, Hello, Happy World!, and Morfonica	

=== Live albums ===
Year	Title	Release date	Peak Oricon chart position	Notes	Ref
2019	BanG Dream! 6th☆LIVE	November 27	10	Joined by Poppin'Party, Roselia, and Hello, Happy World! (Note: Joined by Afterglow, Pastel Palettes, and Glitter Green for 7th☆LIVE)	
2020	TOKYO MX presents 「BanG Dream! 7th☆LIVE」COMPLETE BOX	February 19	3	Joined by Poppin'Party, Roselia, and Hello, Happy World!	
2020	TOKYO MX presents「BanG Dream! 7th☆LIVE」 DAY2：RAISE A SUILEN「Genesis」	February 19	13		
2020	Roselia x RAISE A SUILEN "Rausch und/and Craziness"	November 18	3	Joined by Roselia	
2021	Poppin'Party x SILENT SIREN VS Live "NO GIRL NO CRY" at MetLife Dome	April 28	17	Supported Poppin'Party and Silent Siren, joined by Roselia	
2022	BanG Dream! 9th☆LIVE COMPLETE BOX	June 22	7	Joined by Poppin'Party, Roselia, and Morfonica	
2023	BanG Dream! 11th☆LIVE/Mythology Chapter 2 Special edition-LIVE BEST-	December 27	16	Joined by Morfonica	
