= Momoyo Koyama =

Japanese actress

- 小山 百代
- Born: November 30, 1995 (age 30); Sapporo, Hokkaido, Japan
- Occupations: Actress; voice actress; singer
- Years active: 2007–present
- Agent: Stardust Promotion
- Height: 155 cm (5 ft 1 in)

Momoyo Koyama (Japanese: 小山 百代, Hepburn: Koyama Momoyo; born November 30, 1995) is a Japanese actress, voice actress and singer from Sapporo, Hokkaido, who is affiliated with Stardust Promotion. She is known for playing Sailor Mercury in two stage play adaptations of Sailor Moon in 2014 and 2015, and for playing Karen Aijō, the protagonist of the multimedia franchise Revue Starlight. She is also a member of the musical group SoundOrion.

On April 23, 2020, it was announced Koyama will take a hiatus in May due to vocal cord surgery.

== Biography ==
Koyama was born in Hokkaido on November 30, 1995. Her mother is a nursery teacher. From an early age, she had an interest in acting, particularly after becoming familiar with stage play adaptations of the manga series Sailor Moon; it would become her dream to perform in a play of the series.

Koyama became affiliated with the Sapporo-based acting office Egg in 2007, and she would begin performing in several theatrical plays in Hokkaido. In 2014, she was cast as Sailor Mercury in the stage musical Sailor Moon: Petite Étrangère, and she would reprise the role the following year in the stage musical Sailor Moon: Un Nouveau Voyage. At some point in her career, as she was unsure of what her future held, she considered retiring from acting and pursuing a different career. Following a recommendation from the director of the Sailor Moon stage plays, who was surprised to hear that she was not a voice actress, she decided to try out voice acting. After passing an audition held by the talent agency Stardust Promotion, she became affiliated with them in 2017 and moved to Tokyo.

In 2017, Koyama was cast as Karen Aijō, the protagonist of the multimedia franchise Revue Starlight. Her participation in the series began when she played Karen in the franchise's stage play, which was initially performed at the AiiA 2.5 Theater in Tokyo; she would then reprise the role in the 2018 anime television series. To promote the series, she appeared at panels at C3 AFA Singapore, and CharaExpo USA in 2018. She has also been cast as the character Haruka Shima in the multimedia franchise Onsen Musume. In 2019, she and two other voice actresses from Hokkaido, Miharu Hanai and Reia Hayasaka, started hosting a radio program on STV Radio.

In 2020, she played the role of Elma in Interspecies Reviewers.

== Filmography ==
=== Stage plays ===
List of performances in stage plays
Year	Title	Role	Notes	Source
2013	KobuTa Run De Boo			
2014	Pretty Girl Sailor Moon: Petite Étrangère	Ami Mizuno/Sailor Mercury		
2015	Pretty Girl Sailor Moon: Un Nouveau Voyage	Ami Mizuno/Sailor Mercury		
2017	Shōjo Kageki Revue Starlight: The LIVE #1	Karen Aijō		
2018	Shōjo Kageki Revue Starlight: The LIVE #1 revival	Karen Aijō		
2018	Shōjo Kageki Revue Starlight: The LIVE #2 Transition	Karen Aijō		
2019	Shōjo Kageki Revue Starlight: The LIVE #2 revival	Karen Aijō		
2020	Shōjo Kageki Revue Starlight: The LIVE ONLINE	Karen Aijō		
2020	Shōjo Kageki Revue Starlight: The LIVE Seiran BLUE GLITTER	Karen Aijō	guest appearance	
2021	Shōjo Kageki Revue Starlight: The LIVE #3 Growth	Karen Aijō		
2022	Shōjo Kageki Revue Starlight: The STAGE Junior High Regalia	Karen Aijō	guest appearance	
2023	Shōjo Kageki Revue Starlight: The LIVE #4 Climax	Karen Aijō		

=== Anime ===
List of voice performances in anime
Year	Title	Role	Notes	Source
2017	NTR: Netsuzou Trap	As part of SoundOrion	Ending theme episodes 4–6	
2018	Revue Starlight	Karen Aijō		
2020	Rebirth	Kei Tōdō		
2020	Interspecies Reviewers	Elma		
2020	Love Live! Nijigasaki High School Idol Club	Drama club president	episodes 1-2, 8, 12	
2022	Teppen!!!!!!!!!!!!!!! Laughing 'til You Cry	Chihori Hokuto		

=== Video games ===
List of performances in video games
Year	Title	Role	Notes	Source
2018	Onsen Musume	Haruka Shima		
2018	Shōjo Kageki Revue Starlight: Re LIVE	Karen Aijō		
2020	100% Orange Juice	Teotoratta		
