= Yatogame-chan Kansatsu Nikki =

Japanese manga series

- The cover of the first volume

八十亀ちゃんかんさつにっき
- Genre: Comedy
- Manga
- Written by: Masaki Andō
- Published by: Ichijinsha
- Magazine: Monthly Comic Rex
- Original run: May 28, 2016 – September 27, 2022
- Volumes: 13
- Anime television series
- Directed by: Hisayoshi Hirasawa
- Written by: Words in Stereo
- Studio: Saetta (seasons 1–3); Hayabusa Film (season 4)
- Licensed by: Crunchyroll
- Original network: TVA; Tokyo MX; AT-X
- Original run: April 4, 2019 – June 11, 2022
- Episodes: 46

Yatogame-chan Kansatsu Nikki (Japanese: 八十亀ちゃんかんさつにっき; lit. 'Yatogame-chan Observation Diary') is a Japanese four-panel manga series written and illustrated by Masaki Andō. It was serialized in Ichijinsha's Monthly Comic Rex magazine from May 2016 to September 2022. An anime television series adaptation by Saetta aired from April to June 2019, with a second season airing from January to March 2020. A third season aired from January to March 2021. A fourth season aired from April to June 2022.

== Plot ==
High school student Toshika Jin moves from Tokyo to Nagoya where he learns through his new classmate Monaka Yatogame and her friends about the peculiarities of life in his new hometown and the quirks of its inhabitants.

== Characters ==
Monaka Yatogame (八十亀 最中, Yatogame Monaka)
Voiced by: Haruka Tomatsu
Mai Tadakusa (只草 舞衣, Tadakusa Mai)
Voiced by: Yuki Wakai
Yanna Sasatsu (笹津 やん菜, Sasatsu Yanna)
Voiced by: Mikako Komatsu
Kaito Jin (陣 界斗, Jin Kaito)
Voiced by: Mitsuhiro Ichiki
Toshika Jin (陣 繁華, Jin Toshika)
Voiced by: Hisako Tōjō
Lala Shonai (初内 ララ, Shonai Rara)
Voiced by: Yoshino Nanjō
Rin Jandara (雀田来 鈴, Jandara Rin)
Voiced by: Eriko Matsui
Teppei (鉄平, Teppei)
Voiced by: Kenji Akabane
Shiharu Itemae (一天前 紫春, Itemae Shiharu)
Voiced by: Honoka Kuroki
Nanaho Koshiyasu (輿安 七帆, Koshiyasu Nanaho)
Voiced by: Ayasa Itō
Recchiri-sensei (レッチリ先生)
Voiced by: Tetsu Inada
Serura Dobe (土辺 世瑠蘭, Dobe Serura)
Voiced by: Maria Naganawa
Masahide Tsuji (辻 優秀, Tsuji Masahide)
Voiced by: Junji Majima
Shō Kochikashi (東風樫 湘, Kochikashi Shō)
Voiced by: Sumire Uesaka
Kei Aonaji (青那寺 恵, Aonaji Kei)
Voiced by: Sora Tokui
Kiina Asaka (朝霞 きぃな, Asaka Kiina)
Voiced by: Reo Kurachi

== Media ==
=== Manga ===
Masaki Andō launched the manga in Ichijinsha's shōnen manga magazine Monthly Comic Rex on May 28, 2016. It ended serialization on September 27, 2022.

No.	Japanese release date	Japanese ISBN
1	November 26, 2016	978-4-7580-6632-7
2	May 27, 2017	978-4-7580-6662-4
3	November 27, 2017	978-4-7580-6696-9
4	May 26, 2018	978-4-7580-6732-4; 978-4-7580-6733-1 (Special edition)
5	November 27, 2018	978-4-7580-6772-0; 978-4-7580-6773-7 (Special edition)
6	May 27, 2019	978-4-7580-6805-5; 978-4-7580-6806-2 (Special edition)
7	November 27, 2019	978-4-7580-6826-0; 978-4-7580-6827-7 (Special edition)
8	March 27, 2020	978-4-7580-6853-6; 978-4-7580-6854-3 (Special edition)
9	October 27, 2020	978-4-7580-6888-8; 978-4-7580-6889-5 (Special edition)
10	May 27, 2021	978-4-7580-6909-0; 978-4-7580-6910-6 (Special edition)
11	November 26, 2021	978-4-7580-6948-9
12	April 27, 2022	978-4-7580-6975-5
13	December 27, 2022	978-4-7580-8391-1

=== Anime ===
An anime adaptation was announced in Volume 4of the manga on May 26, 2018. The television series is directed by Hisayoshi Hirasawa, with animation by studio Saetta. Satsuki Hayasaka is the character designer, and Words in Stereo is credited for series composition. Creators in Pack is credited with animation cooperation. The series premiered from April 4 to June 20, 2019, and was broadcast on TVA, Tokyo MX, and AT-X. Haruka Tomatsu performed the series' opening theme song "Deluxe Deluxe Happy".

After the series' finale, it was announced that the series would receive a second season. The season, titled Yatogame-chan Kansatsu Nikki 2 Satsume (八十亀ちゃんかんさつにっき 2さつめ), premiered from January 5 to March 22, 2020, with the cast and staff reprising their roles. Levels joins Creators in Pack in the animation cooperation. +α/Alphakyun performed the second season's opening theme song "Imaginary Love". The second season will run for 12 episodes.

On September 25, 2020, it was announced that the anime series received a third season. The season, titled Yatogame-chan Kansatsu Nikki 3 Satsume (八十亀ちゃんかんさつにっき 3さつめ), aired from January 10 to March 28, 2021, with the cast and staff reprising their roles. The opening theme song is "Don't Be a Weed Soul!" (雑草魂なめんなよ！, Zassō Damashii Namennayo!) performed by Taiki. Crunchyroll licensed the series.

A fourth season of the series was announced on November 23, 2021. It is titled Yatogame-chan Kansatsu Nikki" 4 Satsume (八十亀ちゃんかんさつにっき 4さつめ), is produced by Hayabusa Film, with Creators in Pack credited with animation cooperation. The rest of the main staff and cast reprised their roles. It aired from April 9 to June 11, 2022. A special announcement program aired on April 2. The opening theme song is performed by Akira Ouse.

=== Series overview ===
Season	Episodes	Originally released	
Season	Episodes	First released	Last released
1	12	April 4, 2019	June 20, 2019
2	12	January 5, 2020	March 22, 2020
3	12	January 10, 2021	March 28, 2021
4	10	April 9, 2022	June 11, 2022

==== Season 1 ====
No.	Title (Note: All English titles are taken from Crunchyroll.)	Original release date
1	"Beginning"; Transliteration: "Hajimari" (Japanese: はじまり)	April 4, 2019
2	"Tokyoites"; Transliteration: "Tokyomon" (Japanese: トーキョーもん)	April 11, 2019
3	"I'll Nyaa-ver Allow It"; Transliteration: "Mitome-nyaa" (Japanese: 認めにゃあ)	April 18, 2019
4	"No Good Pictures"; Transliteration: "Torete-nyaa" (Japanese: 撮れてにゃあ)	April 25, 2019
5	"Not Gonna Teach You"; Transliteration: "Oshienyaa" (Japanese: 教えにゃあ)	May 2, 2019
6	"Let's Go to Sugakiya"; Transliteration: "Sugakiya Iko-myaa" (Japanese: スガキヤいこみゃあ)	May 9, 2019
7	"Not Like That"; Transliteration: "Sotchi ja-nyaa" (Japanese: そっちじゃにゃあ)	May 16, 2019
8	"This Ain't Akiba"; Transliteration: "Akiba ja-nyaa" (Japanese: アキバじゃにゃあ)	May 23, 2019
9	"Nothin' To Do With It"; Transliteration: "Kankei-nyaa" (Japanese: 関係にゃあ)	May 30, 2019
10	"Just Gotta Put Some On"; Transliteration: "Kakeru shika-nyaa" (Japanese: かけるしかにゃあ)	June 6, 2019
11	"It Ain't Cool Here"; Transliteration: "Suzushiku-nyaa" (Japanese: 涼しくにゃあ)	June 13, 2019
12	"See Y'all Again"; Transliteration: "Mata Ao-myaa" (Japanese: また会おみゃあ)	June 20, 2019

==== Season 2 ====
No.	Title	Original release date
1	"We Meet Again"; Transliteration: "Mata Aeta de yo" (Japanese: また会えたでよ)	January 5, 2020
2	"I Ain't Scary"; Transliteration: "Kowaku-nyaa" (Japanese: 怖くにゃあ)	January 12, 2020
3	"It Ain't Dull"; Transliteration: "Shoboku-nyaa" (Japanese: しょぼくにゃあ)	January 19, 2020
4	"I Didn't Leave Nothin' Out"; Transliteration: "Habu ite-nyaa" (Japanese: ハブいてにゃあ)	January 26, 2020
5	"It Ain't a Main Dash"; Transliteration: "Shushoku ja-nyaa" (Japanese: 主食じゃにゃあ)	February 2, 2020
6	"I Ain't Backin' Down"; Transliteration: "Yuzure-nyaa" (Japanese: 譲れにゃあ)	February 9, 2020
7	"I Ain't Skippin' It"; Transliteration: "Tobasa-nyaa" (Japanese: 飛ばさにゃあ)	February 16, 2020
8	"It Ain't a Building"; Transliteration: "Biru ja-nyaa" (Japanese: ビルじゃにゃあ)	February 23, 2020
9	"It Ain't Weird"; Transliteration: "Hen ja-nyaa" (Japanese: 変じゃにゃあ)	March 1, 2020
10	"It Ain't Weak"; Transliteration: "Usuku-nyaa" (Japanese: うすくにゃあ)	March 8, 2020
11	"I Ain't Yer Servant"; Transliteration: "Kerai ja-nyaa" (Japanese: けらいじゃにゃあ)	March 15, 2020
12	"It Ain't Number Three"; Transliteration: "Dai 3 ja-nyaa" (Japanese: 第3じゃにゃあ)	March 22, 2020

==== Season 3 ====
No.	Title	Directed by (Note: Information is taken from the ending credits of each episode.)	Original release date
1	"We Meet Yet Again"; Transliteration: "Matamata Aetadeyo" (Japanese: またまた会えたでよ)	Ryōsuke Higashi	January 10, 2021 (Note: This episode aired on BS11 and was released on Hikari TV Channel at 9:55 p.m. JST, a minute after the original air time as TV Aichi postponed it at 10:09 p.m. JST.)
2	"It Ain't Dumb"; Transliteration: "Baka ja-nyaa" (Japanese: バカじゃにゃあ)	Ryōsuke Higashi	January 17, 2021
3	"This Ain't Trainin'"; Transliteration: "Kitae-nyaa" (Japanese: 鍛えにゃあ)	Wang Yuechun	January 24, 2021
4	"I Ain't Alone"; Transliteration: "Hitori ja-nyaa" (Japanese: 一人じゃにゃあ)	Wang Yuechun	January 31, 2021
5	"I Ain't a Nagoyer"; Transliteration: "Nagoyā ja-nyaa" (Japanese: ナゴヤーじゃにゃあ)	Tarō Kubo	February 7, 2021
6	"You Ain't My Kind"; Transliteration: "Nakama ja-nyaa" (Japanese: 仲間じゃにゃあ)	Tarō Kubo	February 14, 2021
7	"It Ain't Enough"; Transliteration: "Monotari-nyaa" (Japanese: 物足りにゃあ)	Daiki Takemoto	February 21, 2021
8	"We Ain't a Couple"; Transliteration: "Kappuru ja-nyaa" (Japanese: カップルじゃにゃあ)	Wang Yuechun	February 28, 2021
9	"It Just Ain't Gonna Happen"; Transliteration: "Muri wa Shi-nyaa" (Japanese: ムリはしにゃあ)	Wang Yuechun	March 7, 2021
10	"I Can't Make It"; Transliteration: "Tsukure-nyaa" (Japanese: 作れにゃあ)	Takeya Teppei	March 14, 2021
11	"I Ain't Gonna Last"; Transliteration: "Karada ga Tamota-nyaa" (Japanese: 体が保たにゃあ)	Ryōsuke Higashi	March 21, 2021
12	"Let's All Get Along"; Transliteration: "Nakayoku Shiyo-myaa" (Japanese: なかよくしよみゃあ)	Ryōsuke Higashi	March 28, 2021

==== Season 4 ====
No.	Title	Directed by	Original release date
1	"It's Smack in the Middle"; Transliteration: "Doman Naka da de" (Japanese: どまんなかだで)	Wang Yuechun	April 9, 2022
2	"Welcome, Student Council President"; Transliteration: "Iryaase, Seito Kaichō" (Japanese: いりゃあせ、生徒会長)	Wang Yuechun	April 16, 2022
3	"Ya Can't Say That"; Transliteration: "Sono Kotoba wa Mākan" (Japanese: その言葉はまーかん)	Wang Yuechun	April 23, 2022
4	"A Battle I Can't Go Losin'"; Transliteration: "Zettai ni Makerarenyā Tatakai" (Japanese: 絶対に負けられにゃあ戦い)	Shin Chō	April 30, 2022
5	"More Chicken Wings"; Transliteration: "Matto Tebasaki" (Japanese: まっと手羽先)	Wang Yuechun	May 7, 2022
6	"A Woman's Heart Is Complicated"; Transliteration: "Onnagokoro wa Fukuzatsu da de" (Japanese: 女心は複雑だで)	Wang Yuechun	May 14, 2022
7	"They Ain't Just Round"; Transliteration: "Maru dake ja Aresen" (Japanese: 丸だけじゃあれせん)	Yama Mamimu	May 21, 2022
8	"Gotta Be Bread Before an Athletic Meet"; Transliteration: "Undōkai wa Pan ni Shite Chō" (Japanese: 運動会はパンにしてちょう)	Wang Yuechun	May 28, 2022
9	"Welcome, Honored Guest"; Transliteration: "Gozatta, Raihinsha" (Japanese: ござった、来賓者)	Daichi Nakajima	June 4, 2022
10	"So Many Norms"; Transliteration: "Yōsan no Atarimae" (Japanese: よーさんの当たり前)	Wang Yuechun	June 11, 2022
