= Revue Starlight =

Japanese media franchise

- Key visual

少女☆歌劇 レヴュースタァライト (Shōjo☆Kageki Revyū Sutāraito)
- Genre: Music, battle royale
- Created by: Bushiroad, Nelke Planning, Kinema Citrus
- Manga

Butai Revue Starlight: Show Must Go On
- Illustrated by: Tsubaki Ayasugi
- Published by: Bushiroad
- Imprint: Bushiroad Media
- Magazine: Monthly Bushiroad
- Original run: 6 January 2018 – present
- Volumes: 2
- Manga

Yonkoma Starlight
- Illustrated by: Makimaki Mawaru
- Published by: Bushiroad
- Imprint: Bushiroad Media
- Magazine: Monthly Bushiroad
- Original run: 6 January 2018 – present
- Manga

Shōjo Kageki Revue Starlight Overture
- Written by: Kanata Nakamura
- Illustrated by: Sora Goto
- Published by: ASCII Media Works
- Imprint: Dengeki Comic NEXT
- Magazine: Dengeki G's Comic
- Original run: 30 January 2018 – present
- Volumes: 2
- Anime television series
- Directed by: Tomohiro Furukawa
- Produced by: Akane Taketsugu; Yūki Katayama; Teppei Nojima; Atsushi Iwasaki; Sayaka Shimoizumi
- Written by: Tatsuto Higuchi
- Music by: Tatsuya Kato; Yoshiaki Fujisawa
- Studio: Kinema Citrus
- Licensed by: NA: Sentai Filmworks; UK: MVM Films
- Original network: TBS, CBC, BS-TBS, MBS, RKB
- Original run: 12 July 2018 – 27 September 2018
- Episodes: 12
- Anime film

Revue Starlight: Rondo Rondo Rondo
- Directed by: Tomohiro Furukawa
- Produced by: Akane Taketsugu; Yūki Katayama; Teppei Nojima; Atsushi Iwasaki; Sayaka Shimoizumi
- Written by: Tatsuto Higuchi
- Music by: Tatsuya Kato; Yoshiaki Fujisawa
- Studio: Kinema Citrus
- Released: 7 August 2020
- Runtime: 119 minutes
- Anime film

Revue Starlight
- Directed by: Tomohiro Furukawa
- Produced by: Akane Taketsugu; Yūki Katayama; Teppei Nojima; Atsushi Iwasaki; Sayaka Shimoizumi
- Written by: Tatsuto Higuchi
- Music by: Tatsuya Kato; Yoshiaki Fujisawa
- Studio: Kinema Citrus
- Licensed by: Sentai Filmworks
- Released: 4 June 2021
- Runtime: 120 minutes
- icon

Revue Starlight (少女☆歌劇 レヴュースタァライト, Shōjo Kageki Revyū Sutāraito; lit. Girls' Musical Revue Starlight) is a Japanese media franchise created in 2017 by Bushiroad, Nelke Planning and Kinema Citrus. It primarily consists of a series of musicals, debuting between 22 and 24 September 2017 at the AiiA 2.5 Theater Tokyo; a 12-episode anime television series directed by Tomohiro Furukawa which aired between July and September 2018; and two animated films, released on 7 August 2020, and 4 June 2021, which abridged and continued the story of the anime. It has received three manga adaptations, all of which began serialization in January 2018.

A smartphone game titled Shōjo Kageki Revue Starlight: Re LIVE, developed by Ateam, launched in October 2018. Six years after the game's launch, the game ended service for all servers in September 2024. A visual novel game titled Shōjo☆Kageki Revue Starlight Stage Musical Impression Drama: Distant El Dorado was launched on 8 August 2024 for the Nintendo Switch and PC via Steam. The visual novel is a sequel to the franchise's second animated film, Revue Starlight: The Movie. A new anime sequel has been announced.

== Premise ==
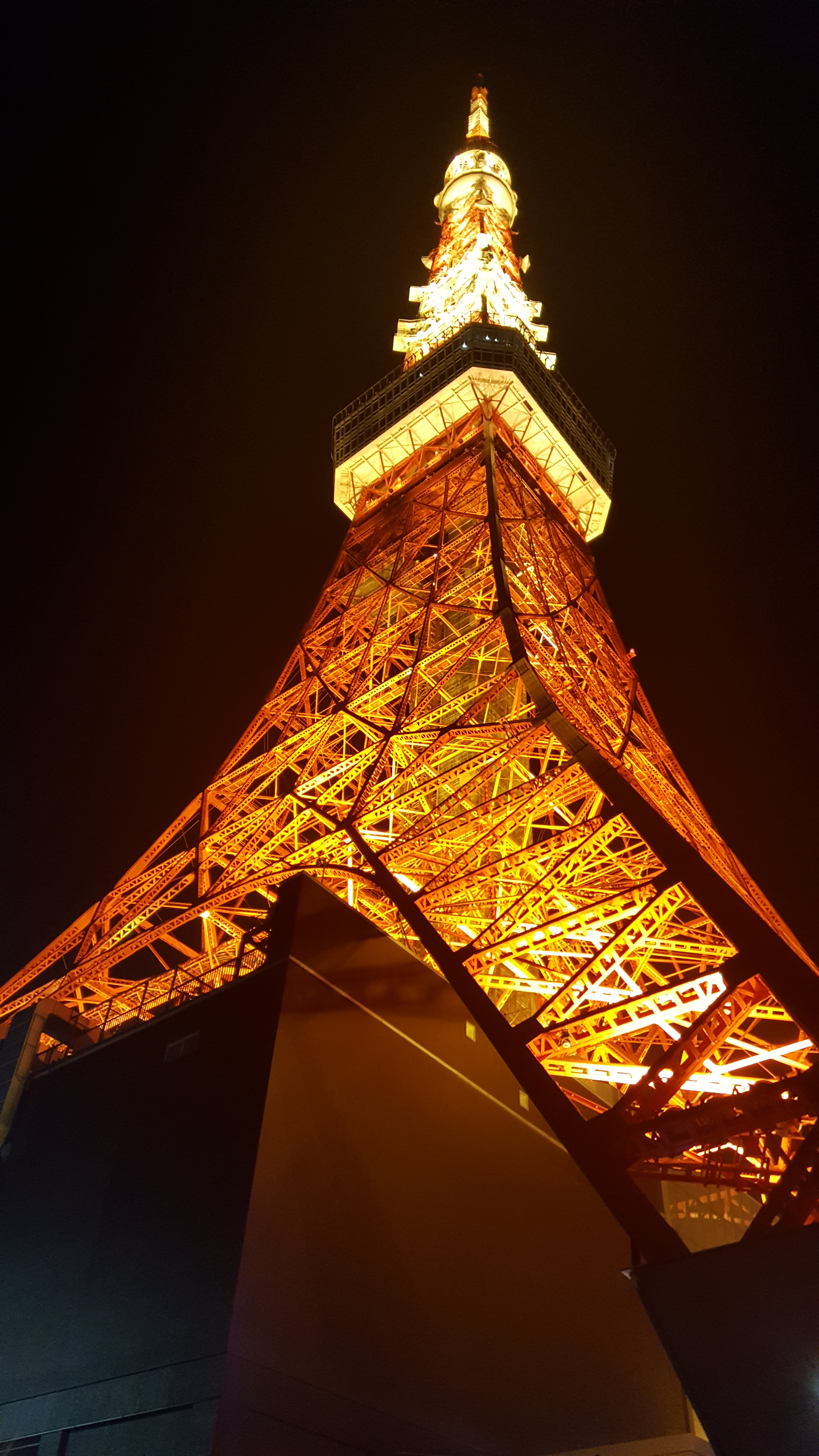
Tokyo Tower appears prominently and repeatedly throughout the anime series and subsequent films. The tower appears in its real-world landmark form, but also as a replaceable stage prop or scenery in full-scale or giant scale.

The Revue Starlight franchise includes stage musicals, a musical animated series, musical films, and a mobile game each telling original, interconnected stories about the training, personal lives, and growth of several groups of female performing arts students, who are distinguished from their peers as "Stage Girls" by their exceptional zeal for stage acting, ambition for stardom, and competitive nature. Over multiple school years, the characters are drawn together by these shared qualities despite their greatly different personalities and talents, while also coming into conflict in their pursuit to surpass each other.

The Stage Girls invariably settle their conflicts by performance in an otherworldly underground theatre in the round, where the "brilliance" that embodies their passion for acting empowers them to stage impromptu musical theatre revues without stagehands or audiences. In these revues, the Stage Girls sing seemingly spontaneously composed musical numbers, clash in largely hand-to-hand combat, and may even act out dramas, on an ever-changing set constructed by unmanned stagecraft. Though the Stage Girls are depicted as using real weapons, the battles end harmlessly with the removal of a piece of the opponent's stage costume, and victory is declared by standing at a taped T-mark dubbed "position zero". The franchise portrays the spectacle of these revues both on stage using choreography and stage combat, and in animation.

A talking giraffe and other characters from the underground theatre host the revues. The Stage Girls take part in some revues after being invited and in others by choice, pursuing goals that carry significant consequences.

In each revue, the characters perform an original "revue song" in duets and ensembles. The franchise further includes a discography of albums and singles collecting these and other original songs, composed in various show tune styles.

The franchise also chronicles the Stage Girls' backstage exploits during school theatre productions. The plots of these plays, most prominently the fictional play Starlight, are often recounted as a story within a story.

== Characters ==
As the same characters appear in both staged and animated media, each character is performed live by her voice actress in stage shows and concerts.

=== Seisho Music Academy ===
The franchise launched in 2017 with a cast made up of nine students from Seisho Music Academy's 99th graduating class, who have since appeared as the main casts of three numbered stage plays, an anime series, two animated films, and several manga. They have also received prominent focus in a mobile game. In addition, they have recorded most of the musical discography of the franchise under the billing of Starlight Kuku Gumi (スタァライト九九組, lit. Starlight 99 Group), and have performed the franchise's music live in three numbered concerts, as well as two orchestral concerts.

Karen Aijō (愛城 華恋, Aijō Karen)
Voiced by: Momoyo Koyama (Japanese); Brittney Karbowski (English)
Karen is straightforward and carefree. Years ago, after watching a performance of Starlight with Hikari that left them both spellbound, she exchanged a promise with Hikari to one day perform Starlight themselves, which motivated her to pursue theatre to the present day. Despite this, Karen lacked the competitive drive to become a Stage Girl until Hikari's return to Japan, after which she resolved not to yield her desired roles to others. Though her impulsiveness causes trouble for the other Stage Girls, her guileless nature makes them ultimately fond of her. In the revues, she uses a spadroon.
Hikari Kagura (神楽 ひかり, Kagura Hikari)
Voiced by: Suzuko Mimori (Japanese); Patricia Duran (English)
In London, Hikari enrolled in an exclusive theatrical school, cultivating her talent under world-class tutelage for the sake of returning to Japan to perform Starlight with Karen. A reserved girl, Hikari is slow to open up to Karen upon arriving at Seisho, and even slower to speak openly to anyone else, making her easily misunderstood. Weak to Karen's overwhelming affection, Hikari sometimes keeps at arm's-length, but privately takes great pains to protect Karen even at her own expense. She habitually leaves her room in disarray, until reined in by Mahiru. She fights using a rope dagger, the blade shrunken down from a full-length sword.
Mahiru Tsuyuzaki (露崎 まひる, Tsuyuzaki Mahiru)
Voiced by: Haruki Iwata (Japanese); Maggie Flecknoe (English)
The eldest child of a farming family in rural Hokkaido, Mahiru earned many awards in middle school recognizing her performance and baton twirling talent, and enrolled in Seisho at her grandmother's behest. Exceedingly modest, Mahiru fell into an inferiority complex amidst the assembled talent at Seisho, but became smitten with Karen's personality, and found new self-esteem attending to her needs. Mahiru comes to understand that she can find fulfillment in helping everyone, not just Karen. She possesses strong domestic skills and physical strength from family and farm life. She fights using a mace.
Claudine Saijō (西條 クロディーヌ, Saijō Kurodīnu)
Voiced by: Aina Aiba (Japanese); Christina Kelly (English)
Born to a Japanese father and French mother, Claudine acted professionally from a young age and was lauded as a theatrical child prodigy. Entering Seisho, Claudine immediately found herself only second-best next to Maya, dashing her former privileged self-image. Ever since, Claudine has turned her full efforts to measuring up to and surpassing Maya in all endeavours, putting on haughty airs all the while, but she is often frustrated when Maya imperturbably meets her challenges. After working hand-in-hand on stage with Maya, her one-sided rivalry finally becomes a mutual partnership. She fights using a longsword.
Maya Tendō (天堂 真矢, Tendō Maya)
Voiced by: Maho Tomita (Japanese); Olivia Swasey (English)
Recognized by her peers as the 99th class's top student and even addressed deferentially as "Maya-sama", Maya possesses a superior physique and voice and industrious work ethics, inherited from a primadonna mother and stage actor father and honed over a lifelong stage career. Though cordial with the other Stage Girls, Maya is clear-eyed as to their aptitude and limitations. She noticed Claudine's aspiring rivalry with her from their first meeting, eventually acknowledging Claudine as a rival and partner worthy of mutual respect. Privately, Maya harbours imperious and seething jealousy toward all who threaten her dominance on stage, the product of bitter competition in performances past. She fights using a long rapier.
Junna Hoshimi (星見 純那, Hoshimi Junna)
Voiced by: Hinata Satō (Japanese); Shannon Emerick (English)
Raised to study hard and excel in academics, Junna discovered her passion for theatre on her own. Against her parents' wishes, she enrolled in Seisho and vowed to not return home until after graduation. Endowed with top scholarship aptitude but little advantage in performing, Junna still pursues her unclear path to stardom, and is preoccupied with overcoming the gap in talent between her and the other Stage Girls. While her fast thinking and reserves of knowledge in friendship and competition alike, she is prone to over-thinking. She fights using a bow and arrow.
Nana Daiba (大場 なな, Daiba Nana)
Voiced by: Moeka Koizumi (Japanese); Luci Christian (English)
Nana excels in performance with her tall stature, cooks numerous beloved recipes for the other students, and even helps in backstage work. She is kind and caring to others in the 99th class, and often takes photos for posterity. She is nicknamed "Banana" by Karen due to her name, her distinctive hairstyle, and her fund of bananas. As Junna's roommate, Nana often accompanies her. After a year in the acting department, she surprises the class by moving to the stagecraft and playwrighting department in her second year. She fights dual wielding both a katana on her right and a wakizashi on her left.
Futaba Isurugi (石動 双葉, Isurugi Futaba)
Voiced by: Teru Ikuta (Japanese); Chelsea McCurdy (English)
Growing up with Kaoruko at her family's traditional dance school in Kyoto, Futaba became resigned to coming to the aid of the pampered, unworldy Kaoruko from an early age. Remaining by Kaoruko's side out of admiration for her genuine talent, Futaba even followed Kaoruko in enrolling at Seisho on a whim, arduously training to barely pass her own unplanned admission. At Seisho, Futaba further bought a motorcycle and became licensed solely to carry Kaoruko to, and from school. Let down by Kaoruko's lackadaisical track record at Seisho, Futaba begins pursuing her own ambitions to become a star performer, even knowing her roles would be limited by her small stature. She is skilled at stage combat, action scenes, and kendo. She fights using a halberd.
Kaoruko Hanayagi (花柳 香子, Hanayagi Kaoruko)
Voiced by: Ayasa Itō (Japanese); Savanna Menzel (English)
Born into a privileged Kyoto family as the granddaughter of a Japanese dance master, Kaoruko grew up assured of inheriting her family's dance school, and carries herself presumptuously as a master to-be. Trained in not just dance but the classical Japanese arts, Kaoruko is proud of her traditional artistry and has taken her training to the heart; however, she has come to rest on her laurels, spurning having to prove herself further at Seisho. Taking Futaba's unconditional help for granted, Kaoruko becomes stuck in a rut of complaining and scheming to get her way before finally understanding her responsibilities to Futaba. While Kaoruko remains quite self-centered in some measure, she joins the rest of the Stage Girls in competing and contributing in school and life. She fights using a naginata.

=== Rinmeikan Girls School ===
Five students from Rinmeikan Girls School, an institution specializing in traditional theatre of Japan, debuted in 2018 as additional main characters in the mobile game. They have also released one single and performed alongside Starlight Kuku Gumi in their third concert.

Tamao Tomoe (巴 珠緒, Tomoe Tamao)
Voiced by: Tomori Kusunoki
Kaoruko's childhood friend who greatly values tradition. She holds a unique fondness for the school and its performance department as her grandmother and mother both graduated from it. With the department facing closure, she fights ardently for its survival. She fights using a tachi.
Ichie Otonashi (音無 いちえ, Otonashi Ichie)
Voiced by: Azumi Waki
Although her surname means "silent", she's actually a frequent troublemaker. She isn't a deep thinker but is straightforward and friendly. While she can be clumsy, she is willing to work to become a better stage girl. She was an idol in junior high before her group got disbanded and still aspires to be one. She loves pulling pranks on everyone, especially Fumi. She fights using a Japanese war fan.
Fumi Yumeōji (夢大路 文, Yumeōji Fumi)
Voiced by: Reo Kurachi
A student who transferred from Siegfeld to Rinmeikan under enigmatic circumstances. Fumi is a serious, strong-headed, and determined person. Initially, she refuses to participate in Rinmeikan's Performance Department, but Tamao's kindness and her determination influences her to return to the stage. She works a part-time job at Tamao's family's restaurant to support herself and is obsessed with ponzu. She has a younger sister, Shiori, whom she is fond of but currently estranged from. She fights using a swordbreaker.
Rui Akikaze (秋風 塁, Akikaze Rui)
Voiced by: Risa Tsumugi
Tamao's underclasswoman since junior high. Although she frequently gets nervous and doubts herself, she's training to be a stage girl because of her longtime admiration for Tamao and her desire to have a place where she can express herself. She is especially proficient in stage fighting. In addition to theater, she practices kendo and is noted to be fairly good at it. She fights using an odachi.
Yuyuko Tanaka (田中 ゆゆ子, Tanaka Yuyuko)
Voiced by: Iori Saeki
A frequent napper who even brings a pillow to class with her. In spite of her reputation and laid-back personality, she is actually a very smart and hardworking person whose sleepiness during the day comes from her hard work practicing solo until late into the night. However, she doesn't like showing it directly and actively tries to hide how hard she works from others. She dreams of becoming a rakugo storyteller and loves Japanese traditional arts. She fights using kunai.

=== Frontier School of Arts ===
Five students from Frontier School of Arts, an unconventional, modern school, debuted in 2018 as additional main characters in the mobile game. They have also released one single and performed alongside Starlight Kuku Gumi in their third concert.

Aruru Otsuki (大月 あるる, Otsuki Aruru)
Voiced by: Megumi Han
A girl with no background as a stage performer, Aruru is always happy and cheerful, and never lets any sadness get her down, believing a bright attitude makes it easier to improve her performance abilities. She inspires her friends to act to their full potential and sees them as family. Behind her happy personality, however, is a traumatic past - she was abandoned by both her parents at birth and spent her childhood in an orphanage, with a slip of paper her only clue to her identity, until she met Misora and her family's theatre troupe. She is an enthusiastic baker, but her creations are mostly inedible. She fights using two Colt Single Action Army handguns.
Misora Kanō (叶 美空, Kanō Misora)
Voiced by: Ayana Taketatsu
Aruru's childhood friend who balances out her highly upbeat nature. She comes from a stage background, as her parents own a small theatre. Though her parents react with skepticism due to the hardship of the lifestyle, they acceded to her desire to become a stage girl. She has two younger sisters and two older sisters. She also has a huge appetite and often eats a shocking amount of food to keep up her stamina. She's good at basketball and other sports. She's totally unaware of Aruru's past despite being close to her as a child until later stories. She fights using a spear.
Lalafin Nonomiya (野々宮 ララフィン, Nonomiya Rarafin)
Voiced by: Miyu Tomita
She is a year older than Aruru and Misora, yet she appears to be very childish, cute, carefree and energetic girl with passion for rabbits. She's a former model and child actress. She is half-German on her mother's side, although she cannot speak any German. She's very dynamic and dedicated as a stage performer, often working her acrobatic abilities into her scenes. She fights using a hammer.
Tsukasa Ebisu (恵比寿 つかさ, Ebisu Tsukasa)
Voiced by: Emiri Katō
One of the most talented stage girls at Frontier, she suffered an injury that forced her to withdraw from performing for a few months prior to the start of the story. However, thanks to Aruru and Misora's encouragement, she returns to the stage. She had a strict upbringing due to her wealthy family, which lead her to try to break out of her shell as a high school student and become interested in things like fashion and inexpensive snack foods that she was denied in her youth, but despite her frivolous looks, she is responsible, very serious about working to improve her stage skills, and cares deeply about her friends. She fights using two axes.
Shizuha Kochō (胡蝶 静羽, Kochō Shizuha)
Voiced by: Mikoi Sasaki
Known as an acting genius on the level of Maya, Claudine, and Akira. However, because of her skill, she's often pressured by adults around her to diminish herself in order to let other people shine brighter. Outside of acting, she is a renowned gamer and incredibly fond of computers. Shizuha is very health-conscious and often makes smoothies and drinks for her friends and herself that are very nutritious, but taste awful. She fights using a scythe.

=== Siegfeld Institute of Music ===
Five students from Siegfeld Institute of Music, an elite school fostering strong competition, debuted in 2018 as additional main characters in the mobile game. They have also released two singles, performed alongside Starlight Kuku Gumi in their third concert, and starred in a Siegfeld-focused stage play with guest appearances from each other school.

==== Senior ====
Akira Yukishiro (雪代 晶, Yukishiro Akira)
Voiced by: Hotaru Nomoto
As Frau Platin, Akira is the leader of the Edels. She is exceptionally talented in many areas in performance, but she can be uncompromising and miss the social dynamics around her, making her come off as blunt and somewhat socially awkward. She has considered Maya Tendō her rival since junior high. She has high standards for her fellow Edels, but she looks out for them and helps guide them to their full potential. She fights using a jousting lance.
Michiru Ōtori (鳳 ミチル, Ōtori Michiru)
Voiced by: Yuka Ozaki
Frau Saphir and Akira's close childhood friend. Michiru presents a friendly, energetic, and outgoing personality hiding a calculating interior. Her dream is to create the ultimate stage with Akira at the center, so she is interested in directing and producing in addition to acting. She's very perceptive of other people. She fights using a German greatsword.
Liu Mei Fan (リュウ・メイファン, Liu Meifan; 柳美帆 (Note: It is an official translation in the traditional Chinese version of Shōjo Kageki Revue Starlight -Re LIVE-. The Japanese version shows katakana only.))
Voiced by: Yume Takeuchi
Frau Rubin and an exchange student from China who was a famous child actor back home. After watching a performance Akira was in, she was inspired to learn Japanese and enroll at Siegfeld in order to perform by her side. She is outgoing and passionate about everything she does. She enjoys gashapon and fortune telling, though her predictions almost always suggest disaster. She fights using a serpent spear, based on the weapon Three Kingdoms General Zhang Fei wields.
Shiori Yumeōji (夢大路 栞, Yumeōji Shiori)
Voiced by: Hikaru Tono
Fumi's younger sister and the new Frau Jade, Shiori was recruited to be an Edel despite still being a middle school student. Shiori is fairly timid around those she doesn't know, but she is kind and has a lot of potential. As a child, Shiori was frail and only started attending school recently out of a desire to become a stage girl. Despite Fumi's distance and mysterious departure, Shiori respects her older sister and wishes to restore their relationship. She fights using a saber.
Yachiyo Tsuruhime (鶴姫 やちよ, Tsuruhime Yachiyo)
Voiced by: Haruka Kudo
The elusive and mysterious Frau Perle. Yachiyo often teases the other Edels, provoking anger from the more serious ones like Akira and Mei Fan. She often gets swept up in her imagination. Despite her appearance, Yachiyo is an incredibly skilled stage girl and tailor. Like Michiru, she is very perceptive of people. She fights using a crossbow.

==== Junior High ====
Stella Takachiho (高千穂 ステラ, Takachiho Sutera)
Voiced by: Hina Aoki
A transfer student from the Munich National Academy of Arts in Germany and the maternal granddaughter of the school director Victoria Siegfeld. Her given name is Stella Siegfeld, but she goes by her Japanese grandfather's surname while in Japan. Since her ancestors founded the school, she seeks to protect its traditions, though she tends to act spoiled when surrounded by her friends.
Shiro Ōgami (大賀美 詩呂, Ōgami Shiro)
Voiced by: Kanon Matsuzawa
Another transfer student from Germany, Shiro is Stella's childhood friend who also serves as her de facto maid and protector. Quiet and serious, she comes from a family who has served the Siegfelds for generations, and refers to Stella as "ojousama" (young mistress, or Miss Stella).
Ryōko Kobato (小鳩 良子, Kobato Ryōko)
Voiced by: Ruka Fukagawa
A low-achieving student who enrolled in the school as an alternate, she suffers from low self-confidence and is strained by the competitive nature of her classmates. Despite this, she is determined to overcome the difficulties in order to provide for her large family at home.
Minku Umibe (海辺 みんく, Umibe Minku)
Voiced by: Kokoro Kuge
A student who possesses natural abilities as a stage performer, but has a freewheeling attitude that prevents her from getting good grades. She is currently trying to figure out her stage girl status.
Kuina Moriyasu (森保 クイナ, Moriyasu Kuina)
Voiced by: Yuria Sato
The president of Stella's class and a hardworking, serious student who aims to follow Akira's footstep.

=== Seiran General Arts Institute ===
Three students from Seiran General Arts Institute debuted in 2018 in the franchise's second numbered stage play, before being added to the mobile game as additional main characters. They have also released one single, starred in a Seiran-focused stage play, and played central roles in Siegfeld's stage play.

Koharu Yanagi (柳 小春, Yanagi Koharu)
Voiced by: Kanon Nanaki
The "genius of Seiran," a stage girl whose reputation and capabilities are acknowledged even by Maya Tendō.
Suzu Minase (南風 涼, Minase Suzu)
Voiced by: Minami Tsukui
A stage girl who attended the same middle school as Seisho's Mahiru Tsuyuzaki. Suzu was the ace of the cheerleading squad just as Mahiru was the ace of the baton twirling team. Inspired by Mahiru's skills at a baton twirling meet, she requested to incorporate baton twirling into cheerleading routines. Her dream is to stand on the same stage as Mahiru and see the view from it together with her.
Hisame Honami (穂波 氷雨, Honami Hisame)
Voiced by: Yoko Kadoyama
A stage girl who attended the same middle school as Seisho's Nana Daiba. She has a beautiful singing voice and was part of the chorus club in middle school. She wanted to put on a play with Nana, but she felt that she was not good enough and didn't show up at the performance so that she wouldn't bring down Nana.
Kyōko Yakumo (八雲 響子, Yakumo Kyōko)
Voiced by: Yuka Kobayashi
Seiran's club teacher.

=== Other ===
Giraffe (キリン, Kirin)
Voiced by: Kenjiro Tsuda (Japanese); Jay Hickman (English)
The sole occupant of the underground theatre, for the most part, is a giraffe who officiates over revues. Normal in appearance, the giraffe speaks human languages and can contact Stage Girls by a mobile app with a distinctive ringtone. Though he is never seen outside the theatre, he is able to know the Stage Girls' activities and thoughts. In stage plays, the giraffe appears as an offstage voice only.

Elle Nishino (西野 える, Nishino Eru)

Voiced by: Kaoru Sakura
In the Re LIVE mobile game, a young woman known only as Elle joins the giraffe, summoning Stage Girls of multiple schools to the theatre. Unlike the giraffe's revues, Elle's revues – as well as Elle herself – are products of the imagination of a five-year-old child, given form through her fledgling playwriting efforts inspired by the Stage Girls' performances. Though Elle of the theatre cannot speak to the real Elle, the Stage Girls find the real Elle and help to nurture her writing.

Andrew (アンドリュー, Andoryū)

Voiced by: Unknown
A mole teddy of Elle Nishino, who appears in Stage Girls summoning. Like Elle herself, he is just a product of the imagination of Elle herself. In his imagination form, he is a shopkeeper.

== Media ==
=== Stage plays ===
The series began as a stage play performed at the AiiA 2.5 Theater in Tokyo. The first performances, titled Shōjo☆Kageki Revue Starlight: The LIVE #1 were held from 22 to 24 September 2017, and a re-run titled Shōjo☆Kageki Revue Starlight: The LIVE #1 revival took place from 6 to 8 January 2018. A sequel stage play, titled Shōjo☆Kageki Revue Starlight: The LIVE #2 Transition, was performed at the Galaxy Theater in Shinagawa from 13 to 21 October 2018, with a re-run titled Shōjo☆Kageki Revue Starlight: The LIVE #2 Revival performed at the Maihama Amphitheater in Chiba from 12 to 15 July 2019. A third stage play, titled Shōjo☆Kageki Revue Starlight: The LIVE #3 Growth, was performed at Shinagawa Prince Hotel Stellar Ball in Shinagawa from 27 July – 1 August 2021. The play was originally meant to be performed in July 2020, but was postponed due to the COVID-19 pandemic, and an online prequel stage play, titled Shōjo☆Kageki Revue Starlight: The LIVE ONLINE, was held in its place. A fourth stage play will be held in February 2023 at Tokyo Tatemono Brilla Hall.

A stage play focusing on the students of Seiran General Art Institute and a spin-off of The LIVE #2 Transition, titled Shōjo☆Kageki Revue Starlight: The LIVE Seiran BLUE GLITTER, was performed at the Galaxy Theater in Shinagawa from 21 to 27 December 2020.

A stage play based on the Shōjo☆Kageki Revue Starlight: Re LIVE game and focusing on the Edels and Junior High students of Siegfeld Institute of Music, titled Shōjo☆Kageki Revue Starlight: The LIVE Edel Delight, was performed at the Galaxy Theater in Shinagawa from 18 to 27 February 2022. A spin-off stage play focusing on the Junior High students of said school, titled Shōjo☆Kageki Revue Starlight: The STAGE Junior High Regalia, was held at the Hikosen Theater in Taito from 14 to 24 October 2022.

=== Manga ===
A manga adaptation of the musical drawn by Tsubaki Ayasugi, titled Butai Revue Starlight: Show Must Go On (舞台 レヴュースタァライト SHOW MUST GO ON), and a 4-panel manga series by Makimaki Mawaru, Yonkoma Starlight (よんこま すたぁらいと), both began serialization in Bushiroad's Monthly Bushiroad magazine from 6 January 2018. A third manga written by Kanata Nakamura and illustrated by Sora Goto, Shōjo Kageki Revue Starlight Overture (少女☆歌劇 レヴュースタァライト オーバーチュア), began serialization in ASCII Media Works' Dengeki G's Comic magazine from 30 January 2018.

=== Anime ===
A 12-episode anime television series produced by Bushiroad, Tokyo Broadcasting System Television, Pony Canyon, Overlap, Nelke Planning and Kinema Citrus aired in Japan between 12 July – 27 September 2018. The series was directed by Tomohiro Furukawa, with Tatsuto Higuchi handling series composition and writing the scripts, Hiroyuki Saita designing the characters and Yoshiaki Fujisawa and Tatsuya Kato composing the score. In addition, most episodes feature musical numbers by various composers, with lyrics by Kanata Nakamura. The series was released on three Blu-ray Disc/DVD volumes, each containing additional original video animation shorts, between 24 October 2018, and 27 February 2019. The opening theme is "Hoshi no Dialogue" (星のダイアローグ, Star Dialogue), while the ending theme is "Fly Me to the Star", both performed by Starlight 99-gumi, the series' voice actors. Sentai Filmworks has licensed the anime and is streaming the series on Hidive with English, Portuguese and Spanish subtitles, and is also dubbed in English. MVM Entertainment acquired the distribution rights for the UK and Ireland via Sentai Filmworks. A spin-off comedy series, titled Shōjo Konto All-Starlight (少女☆寸劇 オールスタァライト), was announced on 31 March 2019.

On January 12, 2026, a teaser video was released on the franchise's official YouTube channel, announcing a new anime sequel.

Revue Starlight episodes
No.	Title (Note: All English titles are taken from the Sentai Filmworks Blu-ray release.)	Directed by	Original release date
1	"Stage Girls"; Transliteration: "Butai shōjo" (Japanese: 舞台少女)	Shinya Iino; Tomohiro Furukawa	12 July 2018
At Seisho Music Academy, a prestigious performing arts school in Tokyo, the 99th graduating class begins preparing for the 100th annual Seisho Festival, where they will perform the play Starlight for the second year running. While various students hope for the leading roles, Karen Aijō, an enthusiastic but easygoing student, is content for Maya Tendo and Claudine Saijō, the top students of the class, to reclaim those roles. Hikari Kagura, Karen's childhood friend, transfers into the class after years of studying overseas. Karen, trying to reacquaint with the standoffish Hikari, accidentally discovers an unattended theatre beneath an underground replica of Tokyo Tower. Within, Hikari and classmate Junna Hoshimi are engaged in armed combat while performing a musical theatre revue (Revue of Passion, Revue Song: "Until the World Turns to Ash"), as scenery, rigging, spotlights, and stage curtains automate fantastically. A talking giraffe explains that the battling Stage Girls are auditioning to be crowned the Top Star, conferring the privilege to perform a transcendental, timeless role on stage, and dismisses Karen for her lack of such ambitions. Suddenly defiant as she recalls a promise once made with Hikari, Karen is "reborn" as a costumed Stage Girl and defeats Junna by surprise.
2	"The Stage of Fate"; Transliteration: "Unmei no butai" (Japanese: 運命の舞台)	Akane Tsukamoto; Tomohiro Furukawa	19 July 2018
The next day, Hikari remains taciturn, but abruptly moves into Karen's dorm room and plots to remove Karen from the auditions. Junna lashes out at Karen for interloping, revealing her desperation to catch up to elite performers like Maya and Claudine. This stirs competitive urges in Karen to remain in the auditions for the sake of her promise, over Hikari's objections. Karen wins again in a rematch with Junna (Revue of Desire, Revue Song: "The Star Knows"), but the two become friends after Karen encourages Junna to carry on.
3	"Top Star"; Transliteration: "Toppu sutā" (Japanese: トップスタァ)	Taku Yamada; Takushi Koide	26 July 2018
Claudine, deeply affected by having faced Maya in the auditions, bonds with Futaba Isurugi, who is pursuing newfound ambitions in the auditions to become a performer after habitually playing keeper to longtime friend Kaoruko Hanayagi. Hikari holds Karen captive to, unsuccessfully, keep her from the auditions, and is unable to intervene as Karen is greatly outmatched and beaten by Maya, who jealously lays her sole claim to the Top Star title (Revue of Pride, Revue Song: "Pride and Arrogance"). Hikari chastises the defeated Karen.
4	"Promise Tower"; Transliteration: "Yakusoku tawā" (Japanese: 約束タワー)	Masayuki Kojima	2 August 2018
Karen spends an entire day wandering Tokyo in search of Hikari, who has left campus unannounced. By phone, the two gradually open up to each other after reaffirming their childhood promise: to perform together in Starlight. They finally meet up at Tokyo Tower, where Hikari hints at terrible consequences for losing in the auditions. Karen assures Hikari that they can find a way to win together. The two receive a warm welcome upon finally returning to the dorm the next morning, even after earning punishment for everyone who helped hide their overnight absence.
5	"Is 'Shine' Even Possible?"; Transliteration: "Kirameki no ari ka" (Japanese: キラめきのありか)	Yoshiko Mikami	9 August 2018
With Hikari's help, Karen begins working harder in classes and daily life, relying less on roommate Mahiru Tsuyuzaki. Mahiru grows jealous of Hikari for spurring Karen to become independent from her. Summoned to a revue against Karen, Mahiru admits her feelings of inferiority and attachment to Karen (Revue of Jealousy, Revue Song: "Love's Wicked Pitch"). Karen defeats Mahiru, reminding her of her own talents and admirable qualities; back at the dorm, Mahiru finds self-affirmation in bringing happiness to everyone.
6	"Stage Left for Two"; Transliteration: "Futari no hanamichi" (Japanese: ふたりの花道)	Kazuki Yokouchi	16 August 2018
After Kaoruko fails the initial Seisho Festival auditions while Futaba passes, Futaba rebels against Kaoruko's dependency to prioritize her own success. The two fall out, going to drastic lengths to spite and guilt trip each other. Their grievances continue into a revue (Revue of Promise, Revue Song: "A Song or the Blooming of Flowers?"), where Futaba vents her disappointment in Kaoruko's underachievement after lifelong admiration of her talent. Though moved, Kaoruko feigns contrition to elicit Futaba's affection, then dazzles Futaba with a display of her full talent, winning the revue. They reconcile, and Kaoruko becomes more motivated and more considerate in her continued reliance on Futaba.
7	"Nana Daiba" (Japanese: 大場なな)	Akane Tsukamoto	23 August 2018
In the wake of the 99th class's first-year production of Starlight, Nana Daiba became deeply attached to that performance and all her experiences with the rest of the class. The following school year, Nana joined the giraffe's auditions after learning that the Top Star can stand on any stage across time itself. Nana defeated even Maya to win the auditions, and wished to relive the first-year Starlight, causing time to rewind to the start of the previous school year. Intent on protecting the 99th class from growing up and changing, Nana happily repeated their first school year time and time again by becoming Top Star every time. When Hikari arrived at Seisho, however, Nana recognized that the course of events had changed for the first time ever.
8	"Toward the Light"; Transliteration: "Hikari, sasu hō e" (Japanese: ひかり、さす方へ)	Fumiaki Kōta	30 August 2018
While studying in London, Hikari diligently worked to fulfill her promise with Karen, but was tempted by the giraffe into an audition where she ultimately lost to a fellow classmate. Afterwards, Hikari realised that the intangible "brilliance" that propelled her stage performances had been taken to fuel the winner's Top Star role. Fearful of forsaking her promise, Hikari accepted a second chance to compete in the auditions in Japan. In the present, Hikari struggles to battle Nana with a much-diminished blade (Revue of Solitude, Revue Song: "RE:CREATE"), but overcomes this handicap, drawing on her remaining brilliance to augment the weapon's form and function. Even so, Hikari remains haunted by the dilemma that her promise with Karen would be broken if either of them lost. Defeated, Nana warns Hikari that she cannot avert the tragic parting written into Starlight's ending.
9	"On the Night of the Star Festival"; Transliteration: "Hoshi matsuri no yoru ni" (Japanese: 星祭りの夜に)	Taku Yamada	6 September 2018
Hikari reads to Karen The Starlight Gatherer, the English-language book that Starlight was adapted from. In the tragedy, two girls, Flora and Claire, ascend a tower to seek out a star, but are forever separated in the end. Distressed by seeing the 99th class revise Starlight, Nana confesses her secrets to Junna before understanding that Karen was the impetus for this new course of events. With only one more chance to take the Top Star title, Nana fights Karen (Revue of Bonds, Revue Song: "The Bonds of the Stars"). Karen rebukes Nana's fear of change with the admonition that Stage Girls must constantly improve, and wins. Junna helps Nana confront the changed performance to come, and they see new sides to each other for the first time.
10	"The Show Must Go On"; Transliteration: "Saredo butai wa tsuzuku" (Japanese: されど舞台はつづく The Show Must Go On)	Kazuki Yokouchi; Akane Tsukamoto; Takushi Koide	13 September 2018
On the final day of the auditions, Karen and Hikari revisit Tokyo Tower, recalling how they embodied their promise there by trading hair barrettes. Claudine is surprised when Maya acknowledges what she had believed to be a one-sided rivalry. With these four as the only potential winners remaining, the giraffe allows them to fight two-on-two. Together, Karen and Hikari overcome Maya and Claudine's teamwork, defeating Maya and winning the revue (Revue of Fate, Revue Song: "-Star Divine- finale"). A distraught Claudine tries to assume Maya's loss, but Maya takes the outcome in stride and accepts Claudine as her partner. The giraffe pits the winners against each other in one more revue (Revue of Tragedy), dashing their hopes of winning together. Thanking Karen, Hikari defeats her and says goodbye.
11	"We Are"; Transliteration: "Watashi-tachi wa" (Japanese: わたしたちは)	Yoshiko Mikami; Ryūtarō Suzuki	20 September 2018
The other Stage Girls watch on as Hikari refuses to take their brilliance, to spare Karen. Hikari is crowned Top Star, and disappears entirely, ending the auditions. As Karen tries in vain to contact Hikari in the months that follow, Maya and Claudine are cast as the Starlight leads. Though her brilliance was spared, Karen's passion for performance wanes with Hikari gone. Seeking clues, and supported by the other Stage Girls, Karen painstakingly translates the entirety of The Starlight Gatherer, learning that Claire was imprisoned for seeking the star. Deducing that Hikari wished for the same punishment, Karen laments their unfulfilled promise, causing the entrance to the underground theatre to reappear. Karen descends into the theatre as the other Stage Girls appear by her side, bidding her and Hikari to return to the stage ("The Knowledge of a Stage Girl -Interlude-").
12	"Revue Starlight"; Transliteration: "Revyū sutāraito" (Japanese: レヴュースタァライト)	Tomohiro Furukawa; Takushi Koide	27 September 2018
Karen rouses Hikari from an endless solo performance of Starlight, in which she is repeatedly battered by red stars hoisted from far above, but Hikari still resolves to condemn herself for falling to the temptation of becoming Top Star. In a final revue recreating the ending of Starlight, Hikari takes on Claire's role, casting Karen, as Flora, out from her stage (Main revue: Revue of Astral Sins; New ending: Revue of Starlight Gathering, Revue Song: "Starlight" for both Revues). Karen forces the revue to continue, conceiving a new ending in which Flora reunites with Claire, and reaches Hikari by summoning Tokyo Tower onto the stage as a bridge. Hikari gives in to Karen, and together they perform the revue to its conclusion. Later, Karen and Hikari play the leading roles in Starlight at the 100th Seisho Festival, acting out Flora and Claire's new, happy ending.

=== Films ===
On 3 November 2019, during the "Revue Starlight 3rd StarLive 'Starry Diamond'" concert, it was announced that the series would receive two new films. The first is a compilation film titled Rondo Rondo Rondo that was slated to premiere on 29 May 2020, but was delayed to 7 August 2020, due to the COVID-19 pandemic. The second is a brand-new anime film, entitled after the series itself, was planned to premiere on 21 May 2021, but was delayed to 4 June 2021, due to the COVID-19 pandemic and the extension of Japan's state of emergency period.

==== Revue Starlight: Rondo Rondo Rondo ====
Rondo Rondo Rondo is an abridged theatrical presentation of previously broadcast content from the anime series, re-edited and expanded with a few new scenes. Many dialogue scenes are removed, and several of the revue scenes segue directly into each other. Dialogues between Nana and the giraffe are added, commenting on the audition and the surrounding events.

All songs from the series appear in the film, some with new musical arrangements, except "-Star Divine- finale" and "Fly Me to the Star". The former is replaced with "Star Diamond", while the new song "Hymn to Rebirth" plays over the end credits. "The Star Knows" and "Pride and Arrogance" exchange order of appearance.

Before the end credits, Nana, in the underground theatre, notices the red star props suspended overhead as a portent of death. After the end credits, the fallen Tokyo Tower is seen in the underground theatre, and the sound of an oncoming train is heard.

==== Revue Starlight: The Movie ====
Revue Starlight: The Movie (Gekijōban Shōjo☆Kageki Revyū Sutāraito) is a sequel film continuing from the ending shared by the anime and Rondo Rondo Rondo. The film includes 50 minutes of musical sequences featuring six new revue songs, as well as the new end credits song "私たちはもう舞台の上" (Watashitachi wa Mō Butai no Ue).

Having performed Starlight together, Hikari defeats Karen in a chaotic revue. Both the Starlight tower and Tokyo Tower fall to cataclysmic ruin in a desert as Hikari declares their parting.

As they enter their graduating year, all but a few of the Stage Girls of Seisho's 99th class intend to apply to the top national theatrical troupe. Karen, mourning Hikari's return to London, is without future plans.

On their way to visit the troupe, the Stage Girls are waylaid in a surprise revue when their subway train and the city landscape transform into a stage. Detached and without exertion, Nana dispatches nearly everyone, posing cryptic questions about their future that only Maya seems to comprehend (Revue of Annihilation, "wi(l)d-screen baroque"), and leaving them playing out a graphic tableau of death.

After receiving the unfinished Starlight script for their graduating performance, featuring new lines calling for change and rebirth, the Stage Girls arrive at understandings of Nana's exhortations. On another train, the giraffe, appearing in the form of vegetables, drops tomatoes which each of the Stage Girls bites into.

Karen, oblivious to all this, is left alone in a solitary train car heading through a vast desert to Tokyo Tower. In extended flashbacks, Karen's childhood since meeting Hikari is shown: once shy and withdrawn, Karen became outgoing and found her love for the stage with Hikari's encouragement. Receiving from Hikari a Starlight poster folded as an envelope, Karen kept the envelope as a lifelong possession. Even over years of theatre training to reunite with Hikari on the stage, however, Karen repeatedly shrank from learning about Hikari's activities.

In the underground theatre, Kaoruko, as a bakuto, deals a game of chō-han at an illicit gambling den in a Shinto shrine complex. She faces off against Futaba, as a sukajan-clad delinquent, as both crash dekotora trucks through the walls (Revue of Malice, "わがままハイウェー"Wagamama Highway). Squabbling over Kaoruko's resentment for refusing to return to Kyoto together, Futaba offers rationalizations but cannot face Kaoruko when the scene changes to a seductive cabaret club. Atop high scaffolding, they mount opposing trucks and race head-on with weapons drawn, only to fall off together. In resignation, Kaoruko acquiesces to Futaba's victory and receives Futaba's motorcycle as a gift.

Spurred by the giraffe to search for Karen, Hikari boards a London Underground train, arriving beneath the underground theatre. Hikari finds instead Mahiru opening a multi-sport event in a track and field stadium. Forced halfheartedly into a revue that instantaneously morphs into a variety of sport competitions (Revue of Competition, "MEDAL SUZDAL PANIC◎〇●"), Hikari is defeated by Mahiru, then further menaced in a frightening pursuit through the deserted backstage. Browbeaten into tearful contrition for leaving Karen, Hikari is solaced by a once-more encouraging Mahiru in a medal ceremony and is sent on her way.

Nana coldly scorns Junna's retreat from performance to study theatre in university, offering a blade as if to prompt seppuku. After futilely attempting to ensnare Nana in a labyrinth paved in famous quotations while raining down arrows and copies of the character 星 (hoshi, lit. star), Junna, reduced to tears by Nana's contempt, claims Nana's blade as her own and fights back, renouncing the quotations for words of her own (Revue of Hunting, "ペン : 力 : 刀", Pen:Chikara:Katana). Battling obstinately through spotlit haze, Junna steps onto an unseen position zero and defeats Nana through her shocked denial. They reconcile and part without looking back.

Confronted by Hikari on a train platform high above the clouds, the giraffe drops a tomato before bursting into flame and falling to the desert far below.

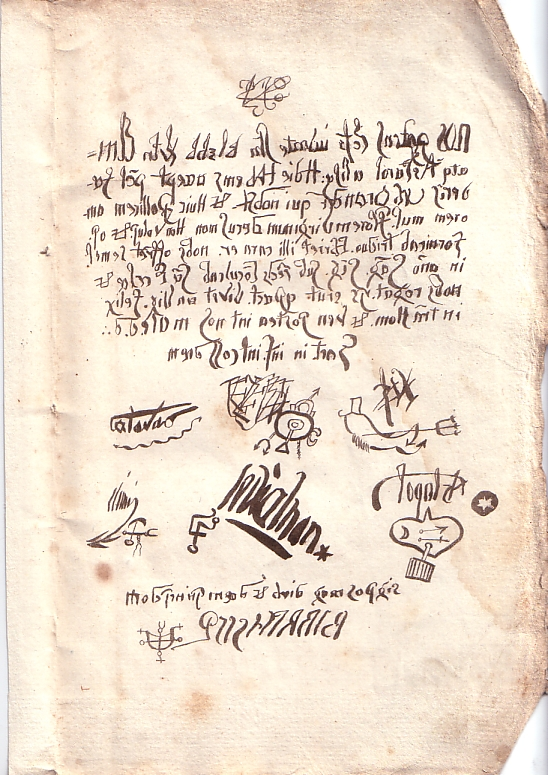
This 17th-century document, an alleged pact with Satan used to convict Urbain Grandier of witchcraft, appears in modified form as a stage prop during Maya and Claudine's scene.

Maya and Claudine perform a play on the stage of a conventional, empty theatre (Revue of Souls, "美しき人 或いは其れは", Utsukushiki Hito Arui wa Sore wa). The Devil in human guise (Claudine) wagers for the soul of a stage performer (Maya) by the signature of a contract. They trick each other, in turn, with artifices as the Devil seeks to take the performer's soul in return for a display of brilliance. Discarding their roles, they goad each other into a frenzied, passionate duel across a web of aerial pathways and platforms. Claudine defeats Maya, fulfilling the contract as the stage set burns down in a towering conflagration. Holding hands, they commit once more to their rivalry to come.

Arriving on Tokyo Tower, Karen finds Hikari with a half-eaten tomato. Still speaking of only Hikari, Karen is unnerved by suddenly seeing the stage and the audience anew. Denied of another stage with Hikari, Karen falls dead as an uneaten tomato explodes. Weeping, Hikari confesses to running from her own admiration of Karen.

Hikari drops her envelope and Karen's body through a chute, beckoning Karen to return. A position zero-shaped metal box with Karen's face lands on a rail car, which carries the box through a fierce sandstorm by igniting rocket engines and launching off a ramp. The rocket exhaust incinerates, in its wake, Hikari's envelope and scenes of Karen's past life. A reborn Karen emerges from the box in front of Hikari, and both are paraded in ostentatious displays of stage lighting (The Final Lines, "スーパー スタァ スペクタクル", Super Star Spectacle).

Hikari's radiance, visible for miles, awes Karen and snaps her sword in two. Both thrust their weapons, and Hikari stabs Karen squarely in the chest. A geyser of position zero-shaped boxes erupts forth from Karen, tearing Tokyo Tower in two. The tower's upended tip plants into a vast position zero swathed across the desert. The Stage Girls, including the others watching from afar, cast away their pelisses as the revue ends. Unharmed, Karen looks forward to her next stage as Hikari gives her a tomato.

Over the end credits, Hikari encounters the Stage Girls at their new professions and studies across the world. Karen is seen at an unspecified audition, her destination unrevealed.

=== Video games ===
A smartphone game titled Shōjo Kageki Revue Starlight -Re LIVE- developed by Ateam and Bushiroad was released for Android devices on 22 October 2018, and an iOS version was released on 28 October. The game features gacha gameplay elements. A worldwide version of the game, localized into English, Korean, and Traditional Chinese, was released on 22 April 2019.

In the game, players collect Stage Girls performing a variety of roles from literature, history, mythology, legends, and original stories, then build parties to challenge a growing variety of single-player and multi-player activities, most featuring leaderboards. Players can select songs from across the franchise to use as revue songs during battles.

The game story, continuing after the end of the auditions in the anime series, introduces the Seisho Stage Girls to the Rinmeikan, Frontier, and Siegfeld Stage Girls in new revues in the underground theatre, as their four schools prepare to participate in the Performance Festival, a high-profile event.

At first, the Stage Girls battle collectively against forces causing Starlight, as well as other plays treasured by each school, to be forgotten by the general public. They then discover that these battles were manifestations of the writings of a five-year-old girl, Elle, who wishes to witness the Stage Girls perform those plays. The Stage Girls decide to continue to perform Elle's stories in revues.

In late 2019, after the game cast performed the real-life "Starry Diamond" concert, including six original revue songs by mixed ensembles between the four schools, the game launched stories, events, and characters depicting the Stage Girls competing in a series of Greek mythology and constellation-themed revues using these songs. However, the Starry Diamond story did not continue past its first two parts.

The next phase of the story, Arcana Arcadia, is written by Tatsuto Higuchi, the scriptwriter of the anime series, and remains ongoing. In Arcana Arcadia, the Stage Girls return to the underground theatre, performing in a new audition to inspire a future play yet to be written by Elle, and to compete for the yet-unknown leading role. At the same time, the Stage Girls are all cast in an original ensemble cast play for the Performance Festival, performing roles based on the Major Arcana, and become driven to outperform each other despite the lack of a leading role. Each part of the story debuted an original revue song.

The game also launched time-limited cross-promotional events for franchises including Hatsune Miku, BanG Dream!, Love Live! Sunshine!!, Symphogear, Steins;Gate, Pacific League baseball, and Sakura Wars. Crossover characters from the Sakura Wars franchise were added to the game as playable Stage Girls. Both the global and Japanese versions of the game ended service on 30 September 2024 at 7:00 a.m. (UTC).

A visual novel which serves as a sequel to Revue Starlight the Movie, titled Revue Starlight El Dorado (Shoujo☆Kageki Revue Starlight Butai Souzougeki Harukanaru El Dorado) was announced in January 2023, developed by Frontwing, with scenario written by Tatsuto Higuchi. It was released on 8 August 2024 in both English and Japanese for Nintendo Switch and Windows via Steam.
