= Mitsuhiro Ichiki =

Japanese voice actor

- 市来 光弘
- Born: January 10, 1982 (age 44); Kagoshima Prefecture, Japan
- Occupation: Voice actor
- Years active: 2003–present
- Agent: Mausu Promotion
- Spouse: Nana Inoue (m. 2015)
- Children: 1

Mitsuhiro Ichiki (市来 光弘, Ichiki Mitsuhiro; born January 10, 1982) is a Japanese voice actor from Kagoshima Prefecture. He is affiliated with Mausu Promotion. As of March 9, 2015, he is officially married with voice actress, Nana Inoue. He is also a veteran player of The King of Fighters and Granblue Fantasy series under alias Yukichi as well as Blue Archive.

== Filmography ==
=== Anime ===
2004

- Maria-sama ga Miteru as Yūki Fukuzawa
- Maria-sama ga Miteru: Printemps as Yūki Fukuzawa
- School Rumble as Hiroyoshi Asō

2005

- The Law of Ueki as Yasokichi Yamada

2006

- Magikano as Haruo Yoshikawa
- School Rumble: 2nd Semester as Hiroyoshi Asō

2008

- Hyakko as Kitsune Kageyama
- Porphy no Nagai Tabi as Monk
- S · A: Special A as Atsushi Hanazono, Oogawara (ep 1–2)

2009

- Inuyasha: Kanketsu-hen as Shishinki's messenger
- Maria-sama ga Miteru 4th Season as Yūki Fukuzawa
- Sora o Kakeru Shōjo as Yubi-tan
- Tayutama: Kiss on my Deity as Hou

2010

- Angel Beats! as Takeyama
- Astro Fighter Sunred as Night Owl (Night Man)
- Dance in the Vampire Bund as Hikosaka
- Kaichō wa Maid-sama! as Naoya Shirakawa

2011

- Bleach as Yukio Hans Vorarlberna
- Fractale as Young man (ep 6)
- Freezing as Kazuya Aoi
- I Don't Like You at All, Big Brother!! as Daigo Kurosaki
- Euphoria as Takatou Keisuke

2012

- Another as Tomohiko Kazami

2013

- Freezing Vibration as Kazuya Aoi
- Hetalia the Beautiful World as Picardy (ep 11)

2015

- Hetalia: World Twinkle as Kugelmugel

2016

- Norn9 as Setsu Takishima
- Touken Ranbu: Hanamaru as Yamatonokami Yasusada

2017

- My Girlfriend Is Shobitch as Haruka Shinozaki
- Osake wa Fūfu ni Natte kara as Sora Mizusawa
- Yowamushi Pedal New Generation as Sadatoki Sugimoto

2018

- Zoku Touken Ranbu: Hanamaru as Yamatonokami Yasusada
- Crossing Time as Takashi Komaba

2019

- Yatogame-chan Kansatsu Nikki as Kaito Jin
- Demon Slayer: Kimetsu no Yaiba as Shoichi
- Vinland Saga as Ari

2020

- Yatogame-chan Kansatsu Nikki 2 Satsume as Kaito Jin
- A3! as Haruto Asuka
- Dorohedoro as Professor Kasukabe

2021

- Yatogame-chan Kansatsu Nikki 3 Satsume as Kaito Jin

2022

- Sasaki and Miyano as Gonsaburō Tashiro
- Yatogame-chan Kansatsu Nikki 4 Satsume as Kaito Jin

2024

- Blue Archive the Animation as Master Shiba

=== Original video animation (OVA) ===
- Kokoro Connect: Michi Random as Shouto Shiroyama
- Maria-sama ga Miteru 3rd Season as Yūki Fukuzawa
- School Rumble: Extra Class as Hiroyoshi Asō

=== Tokusatsu ===
- Samurai Sentai Shinkenger as Ayakashi Marigomori (ep 16)

=== Video games ===
- Akane-sasu Sekai de Kimi to Utau as Sugita Genpaku
- Atelier Meruru: The Apprentice of Arland as Lias Falken
- BlazBlue series as Hibiki Kohaku
  - BlazBlue: Chronophantasma
  - BlazBlue: Central Fiction
- Desert Kingdom as Legetta
- Desert Kingdom Portable as Legetta
- Fire Emblem Awakening as Denis
- Fire Emblem Fates as Hinata, Hisame
- Granblue Fantasy as Icarus
- Granblue Fantasy Versus: Rising as Yukichi
- Root Double: Before Crime * After Days as Natsuhiko Tenkawa
- OZMAFIA!! as Scarlet
- PaniPani-パラレルニクスパンドラナイト as Karyuu Hunt
- Pokémon Go as Shellder and Cloyster
- Street Fighter 6 as Male Avatar Voice Set 1
- Tokimeki Memorial Girl's Side 3rd Story as Oosako Chikara
- Tokimeki Memorial Girl's Side Premium: 3rd Story as Osako Chikara
- Mugen Souls Z as Kakeru
- Tōken Ranbu as Yamatonokami Yasusada
- Show by Rock!! as Yaiba
- Norn9 as Setsu Takishima
