= Assault Lily =

Japanese media franchise

- Key visual for the anime series

アサルトリリィ (Asaruto Rirī)
- Genre: Action; Magical girl; Yuri
- Created by: Kenei Obanazawa (acus)
- Light novel

Assault Lily ~Hitotsuyanagi-tai, Shutsugeki Shimasu!~
- Written by: Kasama Hiroyuki
- Illustrated by: Yaegashi Nan, Mieko Hosoi
- Published by: Micro Magazine
- Imprint: GC Novels
- Published: June 20, 2015
- Volumes: 1
- Light novel

Assault Lily Arms
- Written by: Kasama Hiroyuki
- Illustrated by: Yaegashi Nan
- Published by: Azone International
- Published: July 2017
- Volumes: 1
- Manga

Assault Lily League of Gardens -full bloom-
- Written by: Kousuke Tsukinami
- Published by: Bushiroad
- Magazine: Monthly Bushiroad
- Original run: July 8, 2020 – February 8, 2023
- Volumes: 5
- Anime television series

Assault Lily Bouquet
- Directed by: Shouji Saeki; Keita Nagahara (Note: Assistant Director (副監督). See the Shaft directors credit legend.); Hajime Ootani (Note: Chief Episode Director (チーフ演出).)
- Produced by: Tarou Okada (Bushiroad); Miku Ooshima (Shaft); Masahide Kobayashi (Pokelabo); Shuuhei Nakagawa
- Written by: Shouji Saeki; Shaft (Note: Credited as Fuyashi Tō, the collective pseudonym for Shaft's staff.) (Note: Funimation and Amazon's credits incorrectly romanize the name as "Azuma Fuyako.")
- Music by: Akito Matsuda
- Studio: Shaft
- Licensed by: Crunchyroll (Note: In North America through Crunchyroll, LLC (formerly known as Funimation).)
- Original network: TBS, BS-TBS
- English network: SEA: Animax Asia
- Original run: October 2, 2020 – December 25, 2020
- Episodes: 12
- Original net animation

Assault Lily Fruits
- Directed by: Shouji Saeki
- Produced by: Miku Ooshima (Shaft); Masahide Kobayashi (Pokelabo); Shuuhei Nakagawa; Akihiko Yuzawa
- Written by: Miku Ooshima
- Music by: Akito Matsuda
- Studio: Shaft
- Released: July 20, 2021 – January 4, 2022
- Episodes: 13
- Manga

Assault Lily Last Bullet: Secret Garden Sweet Memoria
- Written by: Minori Chigusa
- Magazine: Manga Ōkoku
- Original run: June 30, 2022 – present
- icon

Assault Lily (Japanese: アサルトリリィ, Hepburn: Asaruto Rirī) is a Japanese mixed-media franchise created by Azone International and Acus. It mainly consists of two lines of toy figurines titled Assault Lily and Custom Lily. The series takes a theme of combining "girls" and "weapons" and revolves around teenaged girls called "Lily" who have to fight against monsters called "Huge" using their weapon called "Charm". Two novels have been published; the first, titled Assault Lily ~Hitotsuyanagi-tai, Shutsugeki Shimasu!~ (アサルトリリィ～一柳隊、出撃します！～), was released in June 2015, and the second, titled Assault Lily Arms (アサルトリリィ アームズ), was released in July 2017. Three stage plays based on the series have also been performed.

An anime television series adaptation by Shaft, titled Assault Lily Bouquet (アサルトリリィ BOUQUET, Asaruto Rirī Būke), aired from October to December 2020. A spin-off mini anime, titled Assault Lily Fruits, aired from July 2021 to January 2022.

== Plot ==
In a near future, humanity is threatened by the existence of monsters they call "Huge" (ヒュージ). To anticipate this, the whole world unites against Huge and succeeds in developing a decisive weapon called "Charm" (チャーム) that brings together the power of science and magic. Since Charm shows high synchronization to teenage girls, these girls are called "Lily" (リリィ) and are regarded as heroes. To train them, the Lily training institution called "Garden" (ガーデン) was established all over the world to counter Huge, and became a "sanctuary" to protect and guide people.

== Characters ==
=== Yurigaoka Girls Academy ===
==== Team Hitotsuyanagi ====
Riri Hitotsuyanagi (一柳 梨璃, Hitotsuyanagi Riri)
Voiced by: Hikaru Akao (Japanese); Sarah Wiedenheft (English)
A normal girl who aimed to become a Lily after Yuyu saved her from a Huge attack two years ago and came to Yurigaoka Academy to find her.
Yuyu Shirai (白井 夢結, Shirai Yuyu)
Voiced by: Yūko Natsuyoshi (Japanese); Lindsay Seidel (English)
A well respected sophomore at Yurigaoka Academy. She always fights alone. She is greatly affected by the death of her partner Misuzu, who died prior to the events of the anime.
Kaede Johan Nouvel (楓・J・ヌーベル, Kaede Joan Nūberu)
Voiced by: Mikako Izawa (Japanese); Dawn M. Bennett (English)
A first year student and a daughter of the chairman of the top Charm manufacturer company Grand Guinol. She is hailed from a mixed Franco-Japanese family.
Fumi Futagawa (二川 二水, Futagawa Fumi)
Voiced by: Rimi Nishimoto (Japanese); Suzie Yeung (English)
A brilliant student and an otaku, she is obsessed with anything related to Lily.
Tazusa Andō (安藤 鶴紗, Andō Tazusa)
Voiced by: Risa Tsumugi (Japanese); Kristen McGuire (English)
A girl who has a very dark past due to being betrayed and abused despite her attempt to demonstrate kindness, and she distrusts many people, including her Lily teammates.
Mai Thi Yoshimura (吉村・Thi・梅, Yoshimura Ti Mai)
Voiced by: Haruki Iwata (Japanese); Dani Chambers (English)
A girl who comes from Vietnam. She dislikes strict training, but has an upbeat personality and doesn't get angry even when she is ridiculed.
Shenlin Kuo (郭 神琳, Kuo Shenrin)
Voiced by: Sana Hoshimori (Japanese); Michelle Rojas (English)
A girl who comes from Taipei. She is a kind girl but always stands up for what she believes is right.
Yujia Wang (王 雨嘉, Wan Yūjia)
Voiced by: Hikaru Tono (Japanese); Megan Shipman (English)
A girl of Chinese descent who was born in Iceland, and attended a Swedish middle school before transferring to Yurigaoka. She is a friend of Shenlin Kuo. She is quiet and self-confident, but she isn't great at showing emotion.
Miriam Hildegard von Gropius (ミリアム・ヒルデガルド・v・グロピウス, Miriamu Hirudegarudo fon Guropiusu)
Voiced by: Karin Takahashi (Japanese); Emily Fajardo (English)
A friendly girl who is from Germany. She is seen as cute and genius, but is also a game addict, troublemaker and always curious about something news. She easily gets shunned by serious people.
Yuri Hitotsuyanagi (一柳 結梨, Hitotsuyanagi Yuri)
Voiced by: Miku Itō (Japanese); Amber Lee Connors (English)
A mysterious girl discovered by Team Hitotsuyanagi under investigation on the beach. Yuyu and Riri take care of her, but she later dies after fighting a Huge.

==== Alfheim ====
Soraha Amano (天野 天葉, Amano Soraha)
Voiced by: Minami Tsuda (Japanese); Marissa Lenti (English)
An excellent Lily with a cheerful personality and a combat power based on high physical ability. It was Kusumi Egawa who persuaded her to not give up being a Lily after her Legion was disbanded.
Kusumi Egawa (江川 樟美, Egawa Kusumi)
Voiced by: Sayaka Harada (Japanese); Meg McClain (English)
A calm, quiet yet excellent and powerful Lily, which earns her a nickname "Child of God". But she loses trust of everyone due to an unknown incident in the past.
Ena Banshōya (番匠谷 依奈, Banshōya Ena)
Voiced by: Rika Tachibana (Japanese); Brittany Lauda (English)
Ichi Tanaka (田中 壱, Tanaka Ichi)
Voiced by: Aya Suzaki (Japanese); Emi Lo (English)
Araya Endō (遠藤 亜羅椰, Endō Araya)
Voiced by: Akira Sekine
Shizu Itō (伊東 閑, Itō Shizu)
Voiced by: Ayaka Nanase

==== Reginleif ====
Shiori Rokkaku (六角 汐里, Rokkaku Shiori)
Voiced by: Rie Takahashi (Japanese); Katelyn Barr (English)
A careless and gentle girl but with a strong determination. She is the last surviving member of her clan and loses the feeling of left arm due to past injuries.

=== Other characters ===
Moyu Mashima (真島 百由, Mashima Moyu)
Voiced by: Inori Minase (Japanese); Madeleine Morris (English)
Shinobu Izue (出江 史房, Izue Shinobu)
Voiced by: Juri Nagatsuma (Japanese); Alex Moore (English)
Misuzu Kawazoe (川添 美鈴, Kawazoe Misuzu)
Voiced by: Ayako Kawasumi (Japanese); Meli Grant (English)
Matsuri Hata (秦 祀, Hata Matsuri)
Voiced by: Tomomi Tanaka^{Ep. 3 credits} (Japanese); Mallorie Rodak (English)
Kogetsu Takamatsu (高松 咬月, Takamatsu Kogetsu)
Voiced by: Jouji Nakata^{Ep. 4 credits}
Mayuri Uchida (内田 眞悠理, Uchida Mayuri)
Voiced by: Megu Sakuragawa^{Ep. 8 credits} (Japanese); Kristi Rothrock (English)

== Production and release ==
An anime television series adaptation titled Assault Lily Bouquet was announced on October 13, 2019. The series was produced by Shaft, directed by Shouji Saeki, and chief directed by Hajime Ootani, with Mieko Hosoi designing the characters. Akito Matsuda composed the music, and both Saeki and Shaft, under the pseudonym Fuyashi Tō, are credited for series composition, with Saeki himself writing the scripts for all of the episodes. Kazuya Shiotsuki (Shaft), Sayuri Sakimoto, and Kentarou Tokiwa were the chief animation directors; and following episode 8, Akihisa Takano (Shaft) joined as a fourth chief animation director.

The franchise's original creator, Kenei Obanazawa, called it "technical yuri" in an interview with Animate, but specifically stated that while he's not opposed to kissing as an overt display of intimacy between characters, he prefers characters to develop deep and meaningful emotional relationships with each other first. He even specifically informed the team of the series that he was not against kissing, but asked them not to force the characters to kiss in the first episode already.

Raise A Suilen performed the opening theme "Sacred world". Hitotsuyanagi-tai, a unit consisting of the main characters, performed the first ending theme "Edel Lilie" from Episodes 1–4, 6–7, and 10–12, while Hikaru Akao and Yūko Natsuyoshi performed the second ending theme "Heart + Heart" for Episode 5 as their characters Riri Hitotsuyanagi and Yuyu Shirai, respectively, Hitotsuyanagi-tai performed the third ending theme "GROWING*" for Episode 8, and Miku Itō performed the fourth ending theme "Mabataki" (まばたき; "Blink") for Episode 9 as her character Yuri Hitotsuyanagi.

The series was originally scheduled for a July 2020 debut, but due to the COVID-19 pandemic, it aired from October 2 to December 25, 2020, on TBS and BS-TBS. (Note: TBS listed the series premiere at 25:28 on October 1, 2020, which is effectively October 2 at 1:28 a.m. JST.) Funimation licensed the series and streamed it on its website in North America and the British Isles. On October 29, 2020, Funimation announced that the series would receive an English dub, which premiered the following day.

On January 12, 2021, it was announced that the series would be getting a spin-off mini-anime, titled Assault Lily Fruits (アサルトリリィ ふるーつ), which was released from July 20, 2021, to January 4, 2022. Shouji Saeki returned to direct the series with Akito Matsuda's music; Yumi Shimizu designed the series' chibi characters; and Shaft producer Miku Ooshima wrote the screenplay. Hikaru Akao, Yūko Natsuyoshi, Ayaka Fujii, and Kaori Maeda performed the series' theme "Can't Stop Fruity" as their respective characters.

=== Episodes ===
==== Assault Lily Bouquet ====
No.	Title (Note: English translated titles are taken from Funimation.)	Directed by	Storyboarded by	Original release date	Ref.
1	"Water Lily: Purely of Heart"; Transliteration: "Suiren" (Japanese: スイレン)	Keita Nagahara	Shouji Saeki; Keita Nagahara	October 2, 2020	
2	"Lily of the Valley: Return of Happiness"; Transliteration: "Suzuran" (Japanese: スズラン)	Hajime Ootani	Hajime Ootani	October 9, 2020	
3	"Forget-Me-Not: True Love, Memories"; Transliteration: "Wasurenagusa" (Japanese: ワスレナグサ)	Yuuji Tokuno	Yuuji Tokuno; Shouji Saeki	October 16, 2020	
4	"Fragrant Olive: A Person of Eminence"; Transliteration: "Kinmokusei" (Japanese: キンモクセイ)	Takashi Asami	Kousuke Murayama; Hajime Ootani	October 23, 2020	
5	"Jade Vine: Forget Me Not"; Transliteration: "Hisuikazura" (Japanese: ヒスイカズラ)	Keita Nagahara	Keita Nagahara	October 30, 2020	
6	"Violet: Daydreaming, You Occupy My Thoughts"; Transliteration: "Sumire" (Japanese: スミレ)	Hajime Ootani	Hajime Ootani	November 6, 2020	
7	"Freesia: Innocence"; Transliteration: "Furījia" (Japanese: フリージア)	Shuuji Miyazaki	Takeshi Ninomiya; Shouji Saeki	November 20, 2020	
8	"Camellia: You're Flame in My Heart"; Transliteration: "Tsubaki" (Japanese: ツバキ)	Yukihiro Miyamoto	Kousuke Murayama	November 27, 2020	
9	"Cosmos: The Joys that Love Life can Bring"; Transliteration: "Kosumosu" (Japanese: コスモス)	Kenjirou Okada (Note: Assisted by Hoshihira Fujita.)	Shuuji Miyazaki; Kenjirou Okada	December 4, 2020	
10	"Anemone: Believe in You and Wait"; Transliteration: "Anemone" (Japanese: アネモネ)	Yuuji Tokuno	Yuuji Tokuno	December 11, 2020	
11	"Lily: Purity"; Transliteration: "Yuri" (Japanese: ユリ)	Hajime Ootani (Note: Assisted by Naoaki Shibuta.)	Hajime Ootani	December 18, 2020	
12	"Bouquet: Flower Language"; Transliteration: "Būke" (Japanese: ブーケ)	Keita Nagahara; Shouji Saeki (Note: Credited in the home releases version.)	Shouji Saeki	December 25, 2020	

==== Assault Lily Fruits ====
No.	Title	Directed by (Note: Information is taken from the ending credits of each episode.)	Storyboarded by	Original release date
1	"Strawberry"; Transliteration: "Ichigo" (Japanese: いちご)	Kouji Matsumura	Shouji Saeki	July 20, 2021
2	"Orange"; Transliteration: "Orenji" (Japanese: おれんじ)	Kouji Matsumura	Kouji Matsumura	August 3, 2021
3	"Cherry"; Transliteration: "Sakuranbo" (Japanese: さくらんぼ)	Kouji Matsumura	Kouji Matsumura	August 17, 2021
4	"Melon"; Transliteration: "Meron" (Japanese: めろん)	Yukihiro Miyamoto	Yukihiro Miyamoto	August 31, 2021
5	"Mango"; Transliteration: "Mangō" (Japanese: まんごー)	Kouji Matsumura	Kouji Matsumura	September 14, 2021
6	"Grape"; Transliteration: "Budō" (Japanese: ぶどう)	Kouji Matsumura	Kouji Matsumura	September 28, 2021
7	"Peach"; Transliteration: "Momo" (Japanese: もも)	Kouji Matsumura	Kouji Matsumura	October 12, 2021
8	"Pineapple"; Transliteration: "Painappuru" (Japanese: ぱいなっぷる)	Kouji Matsumura	Kouji Matsumura	October 26, 2021
9	"Apricot"; Transliteration: "Anzu" (Japanese: あんず)	Kouji Matsumura	Kouji Matsumura	November 9, 2021
10	"Yuzu" (Japanese: ゆず)	Kouji Matsumura	Kouji Matsumura	November 23, 2021
11	"Kiwi"; Transliteration: "Kiui" (Japanese: きうい)	Kouji Matsumura	Kouji Matsumura	December 7, 2021
12	"Watermelon"; Transliteration: "Suika" (Japanese: すいか)	Kouji Matsumura	Kouji Matsumura	December 21, 2021
13	"Mikan" (Japanese: みかん)	Kouji Matsumura	Kouji Matsumura	January 4, 2022

== Other media ==
=== Light novels ===
A light novel adaptation, titled Assault Lily ~Hitotsuyanagi-tai, Shutsugeki Shimasu!~ (アサルトリリィ～一柳隊、出撃します！～), was published by Micro Magazine under their imprint GC Novels. It written by Kasama Hiroyuki and illustrated by Yaegashi Nan and Mieko Hosoi.

A second light novel, titled Assault Lily Arms (アサルトリリィ アームズ), was published by Azone International in July 2017.

==== Volumes ====
===== Assault Lily ~Hitotsuyanagi-tai, Shutsugeki Shimasu!~ =====
No.	Japanese release date	Japanese ISBN
1	June 20, 2015	978-4-89-637513-8

===== Assault Lily Arms =====
No.	Japanese release date	Japanese ISBN
1	July 2017	—

=== Manga ===
A manga adaptation by Kousuke Tsukinami, titled Assault Lily League of Gardens -full bloom- (アサルトリリィ League of Gardens -full bloom-), was serialized in Bushiroad's Monthly Bushiroad magazine from July 8, 2020, to February 8, 2023.

A spin-off manga illustrated by Minori Chigusa, titled Assault Lily Last Bullet: Secret Garden Sweet Memoria (アサルトリリィ Last Bullet しーくれっとがーでん ~Sweet Memoria~), began serialization on the Manga Ōkoku website on June 30, 2022.

==== Volumes ====
===== Assault Lily League of Gardens -full bloom- =====
No.	Japanese release date	Japanese ISBN
1	January 8, 2021	978-4-04-899474-3
2	July 27, 2021	978-4-04-899487-3
3	January 20, 2022	978-4-04-899506-1
4	April 20, 2023	978-4-04-899561-0
5	April 20, 2023	978-4-04-899561-0

== Stage plays ==
A stage play, titled Assault Lily: League of Gardens, ran at the Shinjuku Face venue in Tokyo from January 9 to January 15, 2020. A second stage play, titled Assault Lily: The Fateful Gift, ran at the Tokyo Tatemono Brillia Hall from September 3 to September 13, 2020. A third stage play, titled Assault Lily: Lost Memories, ran at the Sunshine Theatre in Tokyo from January 20 to January 30, 2022.

== Mobile game ==
Assault Lily: Last Bullet, a role-playing video game developed by Pokelabo and published by Bushiroad, was released on January 20, 2021, for Android and iOS.

== Reception ==
In a review of the anime's first episode on Erica Friedman's Okazu, Kristin called its "yuri undertones" a trap for yuri fans, saying she "highly [doubts] it will be worth it unless you're really into the skin and bouncing boobs of teenage girls." James Beckett of Anime News Network called Kaede's confession of love to Riri a good sign for those fans tired of having lesbian characters "doomed to the Wasteland of Subtext."
