= Reo Kurachi =

Japanese voice actress

- 倉知 玲鳳
- Born: 22 May 1997 (age 29)
- Occupations: Voice actress; keyboardist
- Years active: 2017–present
- Notable work: Reona "PAREO" Nyubara in BanG Dream!; Esora Shimizu in D4DJ; Kina Asaka in Yatogame-chan Kansatsu Nikki
- Musical career
- Member of: Raise A Suilen; Peaky P-key

Reo Kurachi (倉知 玲鳳, Kurachi Reo; born 22 May 1997) is a Japanese voice actress and keyboardist previously affiliated with S Inc. She plays the keyboard for the band Raise A Suilen of the BanG Dream! franchise, which includes portraying the character Reona "Pareo" Nyubara. She also voices Esora Shimizu in D4DJ and Kina Asaka in Yatogame-chan Kansatsu Nikki.

== Biography ==
Reo Kurachi, a native of Saitama Prefecture, was born on 22 May 1997. She learned to play the Electone and piano during her youth, while her interest in voice acting began in junior high school after watching the anime series Fullmetal Alchemist and K-On!. She joined S Inc., a talent management agency run by singer Hiromi Satō, after passing their 3rd Newcomer Audition in 2016.

In 2018, Kurachi became a member of the BanG Dream! band Raise A Suilen, serving as its keyboardist. She voiced the character Reona "PAREO" Nyubara, the keyboardist of Raise A Suilen's fictional counterpart of the same name, in the second and third seasons of the franchise's anime television series. Although her first voice acting role was as a character named Hatano on the 2017 Azure Striker Gunvolt: Striker Pack drama CD, BanG Dream! was her first role in a television series. In 2020, she began voicing the character in BanG Dream! Girls Band Party! Pico, the franchise's chibi short anime spinoff, and in Film Live 2nd Stage, the franchise's animated concert film. In 2022, she reprised the role in the BanG Dream! film Poppin'Dream! Alongside RAS member Risa Tsumugi, she is a host on the franchise-focused variety show Radio RIOT.

Kurachi has also appeared in other Bushiroad media. In July 2019, she became part of the D4DJ franchise as Esora Shimizu, one of four members of Peaky P-key. She voiced the character in D4DJ First Mix (2020–2021), D4DJ Petit Mix (2021), and D4DJ All Mix (2023). She voices Fumi Yumeōji (as part of Rinmeikan Girls School) in Shōjo Kageki Revue Starlight: Re LIVE, the smartphone game of Bushiroad franchise Revue Starlight.

In 2022, she starred in the film adaptation of the Idol Bu Show franchise as Shiho Hoshino (who is part of the group No Princess), and she starred in Yatogame-chan Kansatsu Nikki as Kina Asaka, a student council member.

On July 1, 2024, she became a freelancer.

== Filmography ==
2017

- Azure Striker Gunvolt: Striker Pack Drama CD, Hatano

2018

- Shōjo Kageki Revue Starlight: Re LIVE, Fumi Yumeōji.

2019

- BanG Dream! 2nd Season, Reona "Pareo" Nyubara

2020

- BanG Dream! 3rd Season, Reona "Pareo" Nyubara
- BanG Dream! Girls Band Party! Pico: Ohmori, Reona "Pareo" Nyubara
- D4DJ First Mix, Esora Shimizu

2021

- BanG Dream! Film Live 2nd Stage, Reona "Pareo" Nyubara
- D4DJ Petit Mix, Esora Shimizu

2022

- BanG Dream! Girls Band Party! Pico Fever!, Reona "Pareo" Nyubara
- BanG Dream! Poppin'Dream!, Reona "Pareo" Nyubara
- Idol Bu Show, Shiho Hoshino
- Yatogame-chan Kansatsu Nikki, Kina Asaka

2023

- D4DJ All Mix, Esora Shimizu

2024

- Ōmuro-ke, Kokoro Ogawa
- Loner Life in Another World, Gymnastics Girl

TBA

- Utahime Dream, Himawari Hagiwara
