= Risa Tsumugi =

Japanese voice actress

- 紡木 吏佐
- Born: July 5, 1996 (age 30); Okinawa Prefecture, Japan
- Occupations: Voice actress, DJ, rapper, singer
- Years active: 2018–present
- Agents: Hibiki (2017–2023) JeAC; (2023–2024）; mitt management: (2024–）
- Known for: BanG Dream! as CHU²/Chiyu Tamade; Assault Lily as Tazusa Andō; D4DJ as Saki Izumo
- Spouse: Yuki Honda (m. 2022; div. 2023)

Risa Tsumugi (紡木 吏佐, Tsumugi Risa; born July 5, 1996) is a Japanese voice actress, DJ, rapper and singer from Okinawa Prefecture who is affiliated with Hibiki. She is a member of the band Raise A Suilen (RAS), and plays the character CHU²/Chiyu Tamade in the multimedia franchise BanG Dream!. She also portrays Tazusa Andō in Assault Lily and Saki Izumo in D4DJ.

== Biography ==
Tsumugi was born in Kanagawa Prefecture on July 5, 1996, and moved to Okinawa Prefecture after her birth. From kindergarten to fourth grade of elementary school, she attended an international school where she learned to speak English. After graduating from high school, she moved to Tokyo for university and studied in the school's law department.

As a second-year middle school student, she became interested in voice acting after watching a video of voice actress Aya Hirano perform a live dubbing of Haruhi Suzumiya. Her parents initially opposed her decision, prompting her to secretly register for auditions but she was unable to take part as such sessions took place in Tokyo or Fukuoka Prefecture; they eventually gave their support upon being asked again. At university, Tsumugi started auditioning during her first year and became affiliated with the talent agency Hibiki two years later. Among her early roles were Yukimura Yuzuki in Aikatsu Friends! and Fina in Bermuda Triangle: Colorful Pastrale, and she also voiced unnamed characters in shows like We Never Learn and Anima Yell!.

In 2018, Tsumugi was cast for the BanG Dream! music franchise and became the disc jockey for the project's in-universe and real-life band Raise A Suilen; she had no disc jockeying or rapping experience prior to joining the band. She made her concert debut in the band's live performance at Akasaka Blitz on July 17. In October, she and other members of Raise A Suilen made an appearance at CharaExpo USA, later returning for the event's 2019 iteration. Her character, Chiyu Tamade (nicknamed CHU2), debuted in the anime's second season in 2019 before appearing in the game BanG Dream! Girls Band Party! the following year. Created with input provided to the staff in interviews, Chiyu has various similarities with Tsumugi such as fluency in English due to her overseas education, which allows her to mix languages while speaking. Bushiroad founder and BanG Dream! creator Takaaki Kidani regarded Tsumugi's bilingualism, which is featured in RAS songs, as an important asset in the franchise's growth overseas. Alongside RAS member Reo Kurachi, Tsumugi is a host on the franchise-focused variety show Radio RIOT.

Tsumugi joined D4DJ, also a Bushiroad property, in 2019 as Saki Izumo of the unit Photon Maiden. In the project's debut concert on July 20–21, she performed with Photon Maiden on the first day before joining Raise A Suilen for the opening act on the second. As Saki is also a DJ, Tsumugi explained in a 2020 interview with Anime News Network that the character allows her to "[appreciate] the joy of DJing through my role again." Tsumugi and Photon Maiden host the variety program D4DJ Photon Maiden TV.

In 2020, she began playing Tazusa Andō in the mixed-media project Assault Lily.

== Personal life ==
In 2022, she married music composer Yuki Honda. In 2023, she announced her divorce.

== Filmography ==
=== Anime ===
Year	Title	Role	Notes
2019	BanG Dream! 2nd Season	Chiyu Tamade	
2019	Bermuda Triangle: Colorful Pastrale	Fina	
2019	One-Punch Man 2	Ring-Ring	
2019	Shōjo Conte All Starlight	Rui Akikaze	
2020	BanG Dream! 3rd Season	Chiyu Tamade	
2020	BanG Dream! Girls Band Party! Pico: Ohmori	Chiyu Tamade	
2020	Assault Lily Bouquet	Tazusa Andō	
2020	D4DJ First Mix	Saki Izumo	
2021	D4DJ Petit Mix	Saki Izumo	
2021	BanG Dream! Film Live 2nd Stage	Chiyu Tamade	Movie
2021	BanG Dream! Girls Band Party! Pico Fever!	Chiyu Tamade	
2021	Assault Lily Fruits	Tazusa Andō	
2022	BanG Dream! Poppin'Dream!	Chiyu Tamade	Movie
2025	Okinawa de Suki ni Natta Ko ga Hōgen Sugite Tsurasugiru	Naoya Higa	
2026	Magical Explorer	Claris	

=== Video games ===
Year	Title	Role	Notes
2018	Shōjo Kageki Revue Starlight: Re Live	Rui Akikaze	
2018	Yakuza 3 Remastered	Miyu Shiraboshi	
2020	D4DJ Groovy Mix	Saki Izumo	
2020	BanG Dream! Girls Band Party!	Chiyu Tamade	
2023	Crymachina	Leben Distel	
2023	Fate/Grand Order	Locusta	
2023	Honkai Impact 3rd	Project Bunny	
2025	Goddess of Victory: NIKKE	Mori	

=== Theater ===
Date	Title	Role	Notes
2020	Assault Lily League of Gardens	Tazusa Andō	Ran on January 9–15 at Shinjuku Face
2020	We are Raise A Suilen: BanG Dream! The Stage	Chiyu Tamade	Ran on July 15–19 at Tennozu Galaxy Theater
2020	Assault Lily The Fateful Gift	Tazusa Andō	Ran on September 3–13 at Tokyo Tatemono Brillia Hall
