= Natsume (drummer) =

Japanese drummer and voice actress

Natsume 夏芽
- Born: 20 July
- Origin: Tokyo, Japan
- Occupations: Drummer; actress
- Instrument: Drums
- Years active: 2005–present
- Member of: Shazna; Raise A Suilen
- Formerly of: Claddagh Ring

Natsume (夏芽, Natsume; born 20 July) is a Japanese drummer and voice actress. She is a member of the bands Shazna and Raise A Suilen, the latter as part of the BanG Dream! franchise, for which she voices the character Masuki "Masking" Satō.

== Biography ==
Natsume, a native of Tokyo, was born on 20 July. She began drumming in high school after being invited to perform with the school band, and later attended the vocational school ESP Gakuen where she formed a band with her classmates.

She provided live support at a 2005 fan club event for the band Arashi. In 2006, she became part of the band Claddagh Ring. After she left the band in 2012, she provided live support for Arashi, Barbars, Cyntia, The Marcy Band, Yōichi Hirose, Maki Ōtsuki, Raychell, and Shinkū Horō. In 2012, she released a training DVD named Issho ni Hatakeru: Drum Rhythm Training (一緒に叩ける ドラム・リズムトレーニング, Issho ni hatakeru doramu rizumu torēningu; lit. 'Play Them Together: Drums and Rhythm Training'). In 2017, Natsume joined the band Shazna following the band's resumption of activities.

After playing in the backup band for the festival A-Nation, Natsume performed at Bushiroad's tenth anniversary concert and was recruited by Takaaki Kidani to join Bushiroad's BanG Dream! multimedia franchise. As part of BanG Dream!, Natsume became a member of the band Raise A Suilen, serving as its drummer; she had previously been a part of Raise A Suilen's precursor band, The Third. She voiced the character Masuki "Masking" Satō, the drummer of Raise A Suilen's fictional counterpart of the same name, in the second and third seasons of the franchise's anime television series. When she first portrayed Masuki for the second season, Natsume spoke in a lower tone under the impression that her character suppresses her emotions, but became more expressive in the third season as Masuki's character develops. In 2020, she began voicing the character in BanG Dream! Girls Band Party! Pico, the franchise's chibi short anime spinoff, and in Film Live 2nd Stage, the franchise's animated concert film. In 2022, she reprised the role in the BanG Dream! film Poppin'Dream!

In 2023, Natsume's affiliation with Ace Crew Entertainment ended.

== Filmography ==
2019

- BanG Dream! 2nd Season, Masuki "Masking" Satō

2020

- BanG Dream! 3rd Season, Masuki "Masking" Satō
- BanG Dream! Girls Band Party! Pico: Ohmori, Masuki "Masking" Satō

2021

- BanG Dream! Film Live 2nd Stage, Masuki "Masking" Satō

2022

- BanG Dream! Girls Band Party! Pico Fever!, Masuki "Masking" Satō
- BanG Dream! Poppin'Dream!, Masuki "Masking" Satō
