= Ya Boy Kongming! =

Japanese manga series and its adaptation(s)

- First tankōbon volume cover, featuring Zhuge Kongming

パリピ孔明 (Paripi Kōmei)
- Genre: Comedy; Music; Reverse isekai
- Manga
- Written by: Yuto Yotsuba
- Illustrated by: Ryo Ogawa
- Published by: Kodansha
- English publisher: NA: Kodansha USA (digital)
- Imprint: Young Magazine KC Special
- Magazine: Comic Days; (December 31, 2019 – November 16, 2021); Weekly Young Magazine; (November 22, 2021 – present)
- Original run: December 31, 2019 – present
- Volumes: 27
- Anime television series
- Directed by: Shū Honma
- Written by: Yōko Yonaiyama
- Music by: Genki Hikota
- Studio: P.A. Works
- Licensed by: Sentai Filmworks
- Original network: Tokyo MX, MBS, BS NTV
- Original run: April 5, 2022 – June 21, 2022
- Episodes: 12
- Television drama
- Directed by: Shūhei Shibue
- Produced by: Kasumi Yao
- Written by: Nonji Nemoto
- Music by: Naoyuki Chikatani
- Studio: Fuji Television
- Original network: FNS (Fuji TV)
- Original run: September 27, 2023 – November 29, 2023
- Episodes: 10
- Anime film

Road to Summer Sonia
- Directed by: Shū Honma
- Written by: Yōko Yonaiyama
- Music by: Genki Hikota
- Studio: P.A. Works
- Licensed by: Sentai Filmworks
- Released: March 1, 2024
- Runtime: 119 minutes
- Live-action film

Ya Boy Kongming! the Movie
- Directed by: Shūhei Shibue
- Produced by: Kasumi Yao, Yuka Takagi
- Written by: Nonji Nemoto
- Music by: Naoyuki Chikatani
- Studio: C&I Entertainment
- Released: April 25, 2025
- icon

Ya Boy Kongming! (Japanese: パリピ孔明, Hepburn: Paripi Kōmei; lit. "Kongming of the Party People") is a Japanese manga series written by Yuto Yotsuba and illustrated by Ryo Ogawa. The series was serialized on Kodansha's Comic Days website from December 2019 to November 2021, before being transferred to Weekly Young Magazine; its chapters have been collected in 27 tankōbon volumes as of November 2026. Set in Shibuya, Tokyo, the series centers on Zhuge Kongming, who is transported from ancient China to modern Japan and uses military tactics to transform his new friend, Eiko Tsukimi, into a music star.

An anime television series adaptation produced by P.A. Works was streamed from March to June 2022 and aired on television from April to June of the same year. Sentai Filmworks has licensed the series outside of Japan and streamed it on its Hidive platform.

A live-action television drama aired from September to November 2023 on Fuji TV's Shinsui 10 Drama programming block. A sequel live-action film was released in April 2025.

== Premise ==
The famous military strategist Zhuge Kongming met his demise in the Battle of Wuzhang Plains in 234. On his deathbed, he wishes that his next life would be in a peaceful place, free from bloodshed. He is reborn (in his youth) in modern Japan, appearing in the middle of a costume party for Halloween in the club district of Tokyo. The partygoers (in Japanese, "Paripi", a contraction of the English 'party people') of Shibuya lure him to a nightclub, where he meets Eiko Tsukimi, an aspiring singer, and his second life begins.

== Characters ==
Eiko Tsukimi (月見 英子, Tsukimi Eiko)
Voiced by: Kaede Hondo, 96Neko (singing voice) (Japanese); Juliet Simmons (English)
Portrayed by: Moka Kamishiraishi (drama), Haruki Iwata (stage play)
Eiko is a young singer and aspiring singer-songwriter from Kyoto who works as the resident singer and clerk at the BB Lounge. Her father abandoned the family to pursue a music career, causing her mother to oppose Eiko's involvement in music and creating a rift between them. After being prevented from taking her own life, Eiko is inspired by a performance of American singer Maria Diesel and regains her determination to move people through song. With support from Kongming, she overcomes self-doubt and becomes the lead singer of the record label Fourth Kingdom. Her character is named after Huang Yueying.
Zhuge Kongming (諸葛 孔明, Shokatsu Kōmei)
Voiced by: Ryōtarō Okiayu (Japanese); Joe Daniels (English)
Portrayed by: Osamu Mukai (drama), Ray Fujita (stage play)
Zhuge Liang, the brilliant strategist and Chancellor of Shu Han during the Three Kingdoms Period also known as the Sleeping Dragon, finds himself reincarnated in modern-day Shibuya with a youthful appearance. After encountering Eiko during her singing performance, he is deeply moved by her music and resolves to become her strategist. His high intellect allows him to quickly adapt to the modern world. Kongming later orchestrates a large-scale music event involving major record labels, which leads to the establishment of Eiko's record company, Fourth Kingdom.
Kabetaijin (KABE太人)
Voiced by: Shōya Chiba (Japanese); Antonio Lasanta (English)
Portrayed by: Ryubi Miyase (drama), Fumiya Takao (stage play)
His real name is Taijin Kawabe, a young rapper who has dominated the MC rap contest "DRB" for three consecutive years and has the nickname unrivaled freestyle. However, because he could not stand the pressure, he left the rap world after losing the battle due to stomach ulcers from the MC duel. However, after hearing Eiko's singing in the BB Lounge and his heated confrontation with Kongming's MC Battle, he regained his enthusiasm and decided to make a comeback as a rapper and become a partner with Eiko and others. The name of the person is "Kabe", which is the Japanese word for "wall", which corresponds to Seki (Red) of Sekitoba (Red Hare) Kung Fu.
Nanami Kuon (久遠 七海, Kuon Nanami)
Voiced by: Hibiku Yamamura, Lezel (singing voice) (Japanese); Teresa Zimmerman (English)
Portrayed by: Rikako Yagi (drama), Moeka Koizumi (stage play)
Nanami is the vocalist and bassist for the band Azalea, which she formed in high school with guitarist Ichika and drummer Futaba. Forced to follow producer Toshihito Karasawa's commercial policies, the band gradually lost its original passion. After hearing Eiko and Kabetaijima perform, Nanami is moved to tears and recalls her initial love for music. The band chooses to perform in their own authentic style, receiving a strong fan response and achieving 100,000 online likes with strategic assistance from Kongming. They later reconcile with Karasawa as their producer, and Nanami offers guidance to support Eiko's developing career.
Owner Kobayashi (オーナー小林, Ōnā Kobayashi)
Voiced by: Jun Fukushima (Japanese); David Matranga (English)
Portrayed by: Mirai Moriyama (drama), Takeshi Nadagi (stage play)
Kobayashi is the owner of the BB Lounge, a man with a strong personality who is also a Three Kingdoms otaku (オタク) and enjoys playing Go. He once rescued Eiko from a suicide attempt and subsequently employed her as both a clerk and resident singer at his establishment. Deeply impressed by Kongming's intellect during an interview, he hires the strategist as a bartender and receptionist. Though initially concerned that his small venue would limit Eiko's growth, Kobayashi supports the founding of the Fourth Kingdom record label and continues to assist her career. He serves as the key inspiration for Eiko's song "Hot Chill Hot".

== Media ==
=== Manga ===
Written by Yuto Yotsuba and illustrated by Ryo Ogawa, Ya Boy Kongming! was serialized on Kodansha's Comic Days online platform from December 31, 2019, to November 16, 2021. The series was transferred to Weekly Young Magazine starting on November 22, 2021. Kodansha has collected its chapters into individual tankōbon volumes. The first volume was released on April 8, 2020. As of November 6, 2026, 27 volumes have been released.

The manga has been licensed for English digital release in North America by Kodansha USA, with the first volume released on June 1, 2021.

==== Volumes ====
No.	Original release date	Original ISBN	English release date	English ISBN
1	April 8, 2020	978-4-06-519219-1	June 1, 2021	978-1-63699-137-5
Chapter 1: Kongming, to Descend Upon Shibuya; Chapter 2: Kongming, to Seek One's Master; Chapter 3: Kongming, to Observe Thine Enemy; Chapter 4: Kongming, to Strategize; Chapter 5: Kongming, to Join the Festival; Extra: Zhuge Kongming's House Hunting Chapter 1: Kongming, to Seek an Abode
2	July 8, 2020	978-4-06-520198-5	July 6, 2021	978-1-63699-213-6
Chapter 6: Kongming, the Path Ahead Clear; Chapter 7: Kongming, to Lift the Cup; Chapter 8: Kongming, to Show Sympathy to Thine Enemy; Chapter 9: Kongming, to Light the Way; Chapter 10: Kongming, on an Expedition to Roppongi; Chapter 11: Kongming, to Await His Opportunity; Chapter 12: Kongming, to Kick a Rhyme; Chapter 13: Kongming, to Light the Fire; Extra: Zhuge Kongming's House Hunting Chapter 2: Kongming, to Preview an Abode
3	October 14, 2020	978-4-06-520998-1	August 3, 2021	978-1-63699-288-4
Chapter 14: Kongming, Freestylin' 1; Chapter 15: Kongming, Freestylin' 2; Chapter 16: Kongming, Iron Heart; Chapter 17: The Master Plan to Unite the World in Peace Vol. 1; Chapter 18: Steve Kiddo; Chapter 19: Kin of the Same Chord; Chapter 20: Street Concert; Chapter 21: For the Civilians; Extra: Zhuge Kongming's House Hunting Chapter 3: Kongming, to Decide
4	January 13, 2021	978-4-06-522012-2	September 7, 2021	978-1-63699-342-3
Chapter 22: Dreamer; Chapter 23: To the Battlefield; Chapter 24: To Borrow Arrows with Straw Ships; Chapter 25: AZALEA; Chapter 26: Eiko's Song; Chapter 27: AZALEA Reborn; Chapter 28: The Stories of the Victors; Chapter 29: The Wakatsuki Siblings; Extra: Zhuge Kongming's House Hunting Chapter 4: Kongming, to Live Alone
5	April 14, 2021	978-4-06-522928-6	October 5, 2021	978-1-63699-402-4
Chapter 30: Kongming and the Sibling Rivalry; Chapter 31: The Wakatsuki Siblings Collab Concert; Chapter 32: DJ Kongming MIX; Chapter 33: While We Still Live; Chapter 34: Team EIKO; Chapter 35: The Mother Arrives; Chapter 36: Dream, Incomplete; Chapter 37: To Depart on a Journey; Extra: Special Short Story "GuanYu@50,000KM" Chapter 1
6	July 14, 2021	978-4-06-523989-6	December 7, 2021	978-1-63699-511-3
Chapter 38: Kongming, to Arrive in Kyoto; Chapter 39: Entertainment Competitions; Chapter 40: Togano; Chapter 41: The Shape of a Family; Chapter 42: Mia, Come Back!; Chapter 43: Kamogawa Reconnaissance; Chapter 44: Connecting String; Chapter 45: Strained Bonds; Chapter 46: Visitation
7	November 18, 2021	978-4-06-525885-9	May 10, 2022	978-1-68491-169-1
Chapter 47: The Five-District Festival Begins; Chapter 48: Kiyamachi's First Float; Chapter 49: The Vibes from the Capital; Chapter 50: Deception and Switch; Chapter 51: Togano's Secret Strategy; Chapter 52: Frontrunner; Chapter 53: Dreamer's High; Chapter 54: MIA Intercepted; Chapter 55: One More Time; Extra: Special Short Story "GuanYu@50,000KM" Chapter 2
8	January 6, 2022	978-4-06-526485-0	August 23, 2022	978-1-68491-406-7
Chapter 56: Results; Chapter 57: To Act Irrespective of One's Appearance; Chapter 58: Kongming, to Have His First Sauna; Chapter 59: A Major Label; Chapter 60: A Stadium of 50,000; Chapter 61: Hajime Shoji; Chapter 62: Corporate Philosophy for a Hopeful Future; Chapter 63: Headhunted Into Our Company; Extra: Special Short Story "GuanYu@50,000KM" Chapter 3
9	April 6, 2022	978-4-06-527465-1	November 15, 2022	978-1-68491-550-7
Chapter 64: All Warfare is Based on Deception; Chapter 65: Honey Trap; Chapter 66: Well Done; Chapter 67: Promise of That Day; Chapter 68: Border; Chapter 69: Promise; Chapter 70: The Arabesque Woman; Chapter 71: The Newbie Host, Kongming; Chapter 72: Limitless Lion; Extra: Special Short Story "GuanYu@50,000KM" Chapter 4
10	July 6, 2022	978-4-06-528482-7	February 21, 2023	978-1-68491-708-2
Chapter 73: The Legend of Kabukicho; Chapter 74: Health First; Chapter 75: The Face of a Professional; Chapter 76: 1st Album; Chapter 77: The Stage; Chapter 78: Friendship and Daiginjo Sake; Chapter 79: Oncoming Sparks; Chapter 80: The Start of Summer Sonia; Chapter 81: Writhing Festival; Extra: Special Short Story "Kongming, the Pinch-Hitter"
11	October 6, 2022	978-4-06-529480-2	May 16, 2023	978-1-68491-940-6
Chapter 82: Kabetaijin's Decision; Chapter 83: The Calm East-South; Chapter 84: The Rumored Artist; Chapter 85: Proof of Innocence; Chapter 86: The Wind's Rock; Chapter 87: A Session with the Wind and Eiko; Chapter 88: Swaying Wind; Chapter 89: The Start of the Summer War; Chapter 90: Sealed Bridge; Extra: Special Short Story "Kongming's Day Off"
12	January 6, 2023	978-4-06-530382-5	July 18, 2023	979-8-88933-042-4
Chapter 91: Might of the Horse; Chapter 92: The Beginning of a Legend; Chapter 93: The Truth Behind The Altar; Chapter 94: Prayer for Song; Chapter 95: A Strategy of Self-Sacrifice; Chapter 96: RESPECT THE ROCK; Chapter 97: Rock and One Hundred Million Yen; Chapter 98: Listen to the Wind's Song
13	April 6, 2023	978-4-06-531377-0	September 19, 2023	979-8-88933-150-6
Chapter 99: Strategic Triple Strike; Chapter 100: The Look of Miracles and Hope; Chapter 101: Live Bebop; Chapter 102: The One Who Shines on the Great Stage; Chapter 103: A Perfect Stage; Chapter 104: So Close Yet So Far; Chapter 105: DAY 1; Chapter 106: Maria's Stage; Extra: Special Short Story "Morning Contemplation"
14	July 6, 2023	978-4-06-532251-2	December 19, 2023	979-8-88933-294-7
Chapter 107: Eiko's Determination; Chapter 108: A Sudden Break; Chapter 109: What Is Desired; Chapter 110: Something a Little Different in the City; Chapter 111: Interview and Dreams; Chapter 112: Solo Concert Strategy Meeting; Chapter 113: Betting Everything; Chapter 114: To Their Own Battles; Extra: Special Short Story "Kongming, To the Neo Pub"
15	October 5, 2023	978-4-06-533371-6	March 12, 2024	979-8-88933-412-5
Chapter 115: The Truth Behind the Concert; Chapter 116: Excel Twins; Chapter 117: Sparkling; Chapter 118: I'm No Main Character; Chapter 119: Follow your Heart; Chapter 120: Unlucky Man; Chapter 121: Weiwushu's Training; Chapter 122: Old Wounds; Extra: Special Short Story "Kongming, To Party Alone at Night"
16	January 9, 2024	978-4-06-534296-1	June 18, 2024	979-8-88933-575-7
Chapter 123: Into the Gates; Chapter 124: Genius Jockey, Ichikawa; Chapter 125: Desperate and Surrounded; Chapter 126: Unshakable Thoughts; Chapter 127: The End of the Minami Cup; Chapter 128: The Truth of the Five Classes; Chapter 129: Messhi's True Abilities; Chapter 130: Almost Concerned; Chapter 131: My First Stage; Extra: Alternate Covers Revealed
17	April 5, 2024	978-4-06-535243-4	September 17, 2024	979-8-89-478014-6
Chapter 132: The Shooting Star That Beckons the Beginning; Chapter 133: Message; Chapter 134: Dream's Light; Chapter 135: Follow Your Heart; Chapter 136: The Fruits of Success; Chapter 137: Emergency at BB Lounge!; Chapter 138: Trouble at the Supermarket Front Lines; Chapter 139: Uniting all of Japan, the Second Stage; Extra: Special Short Story "Kongming's Modern Occupational Tactics"
18	August 6, 2024	978-4-06-536541-0	January 21, 2025	979-8-89-478314-7
Chapter 140: Get that Deal; Chapter 141: Break Through the Audition; Chapter 142: Kongming-sensei, to Become a True Sensei; Chapter 143: The Kindergarten's Problem; Chapter 144: A Strategy for the Kindergarten; Chapter 145: Kongming, to Counter; Chapter 146: Burnt Stench; Chapter 147: Onward! To Hunt the Bandits!; Extra: Special Short Story "Kongming, on Raising Children of the Modern Era
19	November 6, 2024	978-4-06-537449-8	April 29, 2025	979-8-89-478517-2
Chapter 148: Nothing Can Escape Heaven's Wide Mesh; Chapter 149: We're Just Practicing for Our Play; Chapter 150: Kongming's Trap; Chapter 151: The Kindergarten Siege Concludes; Chapter 152: Another Heated Fight! The Audition; Chapter 153: The Final Piece; Chapter 154: The Genius Director Minoru Asagumo; Chapter 155: Anime Film Script Meeting; Extra: Special Short Story "Kongming's Study Guide"
20	February 6, 2025	978-4-06-538457-2	July 8, 2025	979-8-89-478583-7
Chapter 156: To Discuss Military on Paper; Chapter 157: The Director's Ire; Chapter 158: 3500 Leagues in Search of Father; Chapter 159: Father's Dream; Chapter 160: A Film of the Heart; Chapter 161: An Awkward Wedding; Chapter 162: A Large Hunched Back; Chapter 163: The Sinful Singer; Extra: Special Short Story "Kongming, When Once He Had Ambition"
21	April 18, 2025	978-4-06-539233-1	November 25, 2025	979-8-89-478766-4
Chapter 164: The Heated Film Production Site; Chapter 165: The Two Geniuses; Chapter 166: First Day of Screening; Chapter 167: My First Movie Premiere Talk Show; Chapter 168: The Star of Bad Omens in the Eastern Sky; Chapter 169: Nanami's Impatience; Chapter 170: Rock Battle Japan; Chapter 171: The Dark Horse Appears!!; Extra: Special Short Story "Kongming, the Art of the Super Fire Sale"
22	August 6, 2025	978-4-06-540503-1	February 24, 2026	979-8-89-478896-8
Chapter 172: Substitute Tactician Service; Chapter 173: Haste Makes Waste; Chapter 174: Zen Meditation Training; Chapter 175: State of Selflessness; Chapter 176: RBJ Redemption Battle; Chapter 177: Redemption Battle Outcome; Chapter 178: The Captured Songstress; Chapter 179: Kongming, Crank-In!; Extra: Special Short Story "Kongming, Lecturing on the Experience of a Defeated General"
23	November 6, 2025	978-4-06-541406-4	April 7, 2026	979-8-89-830068-5
Chapter 180: Shooting Starts for the Castle-Raiding PV!!; Chapter 181: The Fourth Kingdom's Own Guan Yu; Chapter 182: As a Professional Office Lady...; Chapter 183: The Masked Helper; Chapter 184: Kongming's Spy; Chapter 185: A Battle Professional's War Strategy; Chapter 186: No One Can Stop Me Now; Chapter 187: Shooting Ends for the Castle-Raiding PV; Extra: Special Short Story "Kongming, to Plow the Fields in the Sun and Read in the Rain in Shibuya"
24	February 6, 2026	978-4-06-542519-0	July 14, 2026	979-8-89-830171-2
Chapter 188: RBJ Finals!!; Chapter 189: Time for Explanations; Chapter 190: Queen of Rock; Chapter 191: Resonance; Chapter 192: Curtain Fall on RBJ!!; Chapter 193: A Stuck-On Label; Chapter 194: The Future That Awaits His Master; Chapter 195: Dirty TV Show; Chapter 196: Declaration of War; Extra: Alternate Covers Revealed Part 2
25	May 1, 2026	978-4-06-543529-8	September 15, 2026	979-8-89-830283-2
26	August 6, 2026	978-4-06-544495-5	—	—
27	November 6, 2026	978-4-06-545495-4	—	—

=== Anime ===
An anime television series adaptation by P.A. Works was announced in November 2021. The series was directed by Shū Honma, with Yōko Yonaiyama overseeing the series' scripts, Kanami Sekiguchi designing the characters, and Genki Hikota composing the music. It was streamed on Abema and other platforms from March 31 to June 16, 2022, and aired on Tokyo MX, MBS, and BS NTV from April 5 to June 21 of the same year. The opening theme song is "Chikichiki Banban" (チキチキバンバン; "Chitty Chitty Bang Bang") by the music unit Queendom, while the ending theme song is "Kibun Jōjō ↑↑" (気分上々↑↑; "Feeling Good ↑↑") by Eiko Starring 96Neko. (Note: The opening theme is a Japanese cover of the song "Bulikirály" (known in Japan as "Chikichiki Banban") by Hungarian singer Jolly, while the ending theme is a cover of Japanese duo Mihimaru GT's song of the same name.)

Sentai Filmworks has licensed the series outside of Asia. At their Otakon panel in July 2022, Sentai Filmworks announced that the series would receive an English dub, which premiered on the Hidive service on September 23 of that same year.

A compilation film, titled Ya Boy Kongming! Road to Summer Sonia, premiered in Japanese theaters on March 1, 2024. Sentai Filmworks licensed the film, which premiered on Hidive on April 23, 2024.

==== Episodes ====
No.	Title	Directed by (Note: Information is taken from the ending credits of each episode.)	Written by	Storyboarded by	Original release date (Note: Episodes are released on Abema and other streaming platforms five days before their air dates on television.)
1	"Kongming Descends Upon Shibuya"; Transliteration: "Kōmei, Shibuya ni Oritatsu" (Japanese: 孔明、渋谷に降り立つ)	Shū Honma	Yōko Yonaiyama	Shū Honma	April 5, 2022
Near the end of Ancient China's Three Kingdoms period, genius tactician Zhuge Kongming succumbs to illness, wishing to be reborn in a peaceful world. He is reincarnated in the prime of his life in modern-day Shibuya, Japan. There, he is moved by the performance of a young singer, Eiko Tsukimi. Eiko teaches him about modern life in Japan, and he secures employment at the BB Lounge, the nightclub where she works. Eiko reveals that she had once considered suicide, but a performance by the famous singer Maria Diesel motivated her to keep living and inspire others through song. However, her career is stagnant and she is thinking of quitting. Kongming offers his tactical skills to help Eiko achieve her dream.
2	"Kongming Uses a Stratagem"; Transliteration: "Kōmei, Keiryaku o Tsukau" (Japanese: 孔明、計略を使う)	Motoki Nakanishi	Yōko Yonaiyama	Shū Honma	April 12, 2022
Eiko seeks to perform at major music festivals, but lacks popularity. Kongming arranges for them to attend a performance by the famous singer Mia Iriomote to try and learn from her, and Mia offers to let Eiko perform at a larger club. However, Kongming realizes that both women are performing simultaneously, and that Mia intends to exploit Eiko's low fame to boost her own audience. On the night of the performance, Kongming employs subterfuge and illusion to lure patrons to Eiko's stage and prevent them from leaving. Eiko's follower count sharply increases, while a furious Mia orders her manager to keep tabs on Eiko.
3	"Kongming Learns of the Right Path to Take"; Transliteration: "Kōmei, Susumu Beki Michi o Shiru" (Japanese: 孔明、進むべき道を知る)	Yasuo Fujii	Nanto Teranishi	Kei Oikawa	April 19, 2022
Kongming signs Eiko up for a local music festival, but she is scheduled to perform at the same time as the popular band Jet Jacket. Having thoroughly studied Jet Jacket, Kongming knows their lead singer has a sensitive throat, and predicts that they will not play their signature song for the festival. Kongming feigns technical issues to lull Jet Jacket into a false sense of security, allowing Eiko to make an explosive opening to her performance and steal the crowd's attention. Jet Jacket confronts Kongming about his underhanded tactics, but he brokers peace by providing them with a concoction that treats throat ailments.
4	"Kongming Lights the Way"; Transliteration: "Kōmei, Michi o Terasu" (Japanese: 孔明、道を照らす)	Michiru Itabisashi	Yōko Yonaiyama	Masayoshi Nishida	April 26, 2022
Impressed by Eiko's potential, an influential music festival organizer offers Eiko one of two performance slots: a local music festival, or a major festival called Summer Sonia with a much higher expected attendance. However, in order to qualify for Summer Sonia, Eiko must first accrue 100,000 likes on a single social media post before the festival. Despite the difficulty of the challenge, Eiko applies for Summer Sonia, trusting Kongming to devise a plan. He predicts that they will need the skills of a rapper, and visits clubs and parties to find the right one. Eiko reveals that her ultimate dream is to sing at Voicell Land, one of the biggest music festivals in the world.
5	"Kongming Busts a Rhyme"; Transliteration: "Kōmei, In o Fumu" (Japanese: 孔明、韻を踏む)	Yūki Morita	Hideaki Shirasaka	Ken'ichi Imaizumi	May 3, 2022
A talented young rapper, Kabetaijin, is pursued by his rival, Sekitoba Kung Fu, who seeks a rematch after being defeated by him in a rap battle. While rap is his passion, Kabetaijin swore off it after developing stomach ulcers from the pressure of success. Kongming tracks him down and challenges him to a rap battle at the BB Lounge. If Kongming wins, Kabetaijin must join his cause; if Kabetaijin wins, Kongming will grant him one wish. Intrigued, Kabetaijin decides to scope out the BB Lounge.
6	"Kongming's Freestyle"; Transliteration: "Kōmeizu Furīsutairu" (Japanese: 孔明's フリースタイル)	Aya Kobayashi	Hideaki Shirasaka	Shū Honma	May 10, 2022
At the nightclub, Kabetaijin has second thoughts until Eiko's performance reminds him of his first forays into rap. Kongming then appears on stage and reiterates his challenge to Kabetaijin. He is goaded into accepting, and the two get into a heated rap battle. Kabetaijin's passion for rap is revived and he defeats Kongming. Sekitoba, who had been watching, is satisfied to see his rival return to rapping. Afterwards, Kongming asks Kabetaijin about his wish, but the latter replies that his wish of returning to rap has already been granted, and he decides to join Kongming's cause. Unbeknownst to everyone, Kongming had manipulated the entire situation, using a spy to determine Kabetaijin's favorite song and sneaking medicine into his drink to calm his stomach before the rap battle.
7	"Plan for Peace Throughout the World, Vol. 1"; Transliteration: "Tenka Taihei no Kei Boryūmu Wan" (Japanese: 天下泰平の計vol.1)	Akira Takahashi	Nanto Teranishi	Masayoshi Nishida	May 17, 2022
Kongming lays out their plan to accrue likes, identifying their greatest competitor as an all-girl band, Azalea, led by the talented idol Nanami Kuon and backed by the major talent agency Key Time. Kongming determines that the best time to act is three days before the competition deadline. In the meantime, he advises Kabetaijin to have a rematch with Sekitoba, and arranges for Eiko to record an original song with the famous producer Steve Kido. While impressed by her skill, Kido advises Eiko to put more of herself into her singing. Kongming provides Eiko with a street performance permit, and she stumbles upon a busker named Nanami who shares her taste in music. They perform together, forming a close bond.
8	"Searching for Oneself"; Transliteration: "Jibun o Sagasu" (Japanese: 自分を探す)	Yasuo Fujii	Nanto Teranishi	Yoshiyuki Asai	May 24, 2022
Eiko feels inferior compared to Nanami and begins losing faith. Meanwhile, Kabetaijin struggles to devise lyrics for his upcoming match with Sekitoba, and he and Eiko have an impromptu performance together. Taking Eiko's suggestion to return to his roots, Kabetaijin visits his hometown and discovers he has become a local celebrity. Eiko vents her frustrations to Nanami, who helps her find her own voice and drastically improve her singing.
9	"For the Populace"; Transliteration: "Tamikusa no Tame ni" (Japanese: たみくさのために)	Shigeki Awai	Hideaki Shirasaka	Norihiro Naganuma	May 31, 2022
Despite seeing improvement, Kido still thinks Eiko has not found her reason for singing. When they next meet, Nanami reveals to Eiko that she is Azalea's lead vocalist. She formed Azalea with two of her schoolmates, and they enjoyed playing their own music despite their obscurity. Then they met Karasawa, a music producer, who promised them success, but only if they sang his music. Initially reluctant, financial troubles forced them to agree. Under Karasawa's guidance, Azalea became successful, but in Nanami's eyes, their focus shifted towards fame and profit rather than music. Inspired by Nanami's turmoil, Eiko sings her own rendition of the song that saved her, which moves Nanami to tears. Nanami warns that they will be rivals the next time they meet, but Eiko hopes to sing with her again someday. Kongming then arrives, having heard Eiko's singing, and tells her that she has finally found her reason to sing.
10	"Dreamer"	Takuma Suzuki	Yōko Yonaiyama	Masayoshi Nishida	June 7, 2022
Kabetaijin draws strength from memories of his old crew, defeating Sekitoba during their rematch. Nanami, still conflicted about her friendship with Eiko, continues to train with Azalea. Karasawa announces that they will perform a surprise concert in Shibuya with a million yen giveaway to secure their 100,000 likes. Nanami is uncomfortable at the idea of buying likes, but cannot bring herself to argue. Meanwhile, Eiko returns to Kido, who is impressed by her resolve and produces her song. Upon hearing Eiko's fully produced song, Kongming relives his memory of meeting his former master Liu Bei for the first time and swearing loyalty to him. Over the next few days, Eiko continues to improve her singing and decides on the name of her new song: "Dreamer".
11	"Borrowing Arrows with Straw Boats"; Transliteration: "Sōsen Shakusen" (Japanese: 草船借箭)	Akira Takamura	Yōko Yonaiyama	Jong Heo	June 14, 2022
Karasawa plans to have Azalea perform a surprise concert at Shibuya 109, where they will distribute a QR code for fans to enter the giveaway, at the same time giving Azalea likes. However, Kongming preemptively has Eiko perform an Azalea song at Shibuya 109 while showing his own QR code, tricking the Azalea fans into giving Eiko 70,000 likes before they are outed as imposters. When Azalea arrives, Nanami is alarmed to see Eiko is her rival and becomes anxious about performing. Kongming considers using a strategy to break Azalea apart, but changes plans out of respect for Eiko and Nanami's friendship. Instead, he has Kabetaijin perform a provocative rap song accusing Azalea of being fake, and sows doubt in the crowd, halting Azalea's likes at 98,000. With both sides at a stalemate, Eiko prepares to tip the balance in her favor with her song.
12	"Eiko's Song"; Transliteration: "Eiko no Uta" (Japanese: 英子の歌)	Shū Honma	Yōko Yonaiyama	Shū Honma	June 21, 2022
Eiko sings Dreamer, which moves Azalea and the audience, accruing 100,000 likes. Despite losing the contest, Nanami and her bandmates are inspired to return to their roots and perform one of their original songs. Kongming streams their performance online, earning them 100,000 likes as well and demonstrating to Karasawa that they are capable of attracting true fans. During a victory party for Eiko, Kongming meets with Karasawa properly, noting that he was an aspiring musician in his youth as well before being betrayed by one of his bandmates. Karasawa admits that he saw Azalea's talent and sought to prevent them from meeting the same fate he suffered. Having heard the exchange, Azalea agrees to continue to work with him on the condition that they perform as their true selves. Later, Eiko thanks Kongming for his help; Kongming thanks her for providing him a purpose in life that does not involve war. Kongming notes that the first volume of his plan to achieve Eiko's dream is complete.

=== Drama ===
A television drama produced by Fuji TV and C&I Entertainment was announced in May 2023. The series is directed by Shūhei Shibue, with scripts written by Nonji Nemoto. Osamu Mukai has been cast as Zhuge Kongming, while Moka Kamishiraishi will portray Eiko Tsukimi. It aired on Fuji TV's Shinsui 10 Drama programming block from September 27 to November 29, 2023.

=== Live-action film ===
A live-action film sequel to the series was announced in December 2024. The film features the same staff and starring roles from the television drama. It premiered on April 25, 2025.

=== Stage play ===
A stage play adaptation was announced in December 2023. It was written and directed by Akira Ishida from the comedian duo Non Style, and starred Ray Fujita, Haruki Iwata, and Moeka Koizumi, among others. It ran in Tokyo from May 3 to 6 and in Osaka on May 10 and 11, 2024.

== Reception ==
By October 2022, the manga had over 1.2 million copies in circulation.

The series won the Next Manga Award's U-Next award in the web category in 2020. The series ranked ninth on the "Nationwide Bookstore Employees' Recommended Comics of 2021" by the Honya Club website. The series was nominated for the 69th Shogakukan Manga Award. (Note: Unlike previous years, the nominees were not divided into categories in the 2023 award.)

=== Accolades ===
Year	Ceremony	Category	Recipient	Result	Ref.
2023	7th Crunchyroll Anime Awards	Best New Series	Ya Boy Kongming!	Nominated	
2023	7th Crunchyroll Anime Awards	Best Comedy	Ya Boy Kongming!	Nominated	
2023	7th Crunchyroll Anime Awards	Best Score	Ya Boy Kongming!	Nominated	
2023	7th Crunchyroll Anime Awards	Best Anime Song	"Chikichiki Banban" by Queendom	Nominated	
2023	7th Crunchyroll Anime Awards	Best Opening Sequence	"Chikichiki Banban" by Queendom	Nominated	
