= D4DJ =

Japanese music media franchise

- Logo
- Genre: Music
- Created by: Bushiroad (2018–2024); Donuts (2024–present)
- Manga

D4DJ: The story of Happy Around!
- Illustrated by: Moroko Kurasaki
- Published by: Bushiroad
- Magazine: Monthly Bushiroad
- Original run: October 8, 2020 – May 27, 2022
- Volumes: 2
- Video game

D4DJ Groovy Mix
- Developer: Donuts
- Publisher: JP: Bushiroad; WW: Bushiroad International; TW/HK/MC: Mobimon Inc.
- Directed by: Masahiro Nakayama
- Engine: Unity
- Platform: iOS, Android
- Released: JP: October 25, 2020; WW: May 27, 2021 (Note: Except for China, Taiwan, Hong Kong, Macau, Japan, and Korea.); TW/HK/MAC: May 26, 2022
- Anime television series

D4DJ First Mix
- Directed by: Seiji Mizushima
- Produced by: Chikara Toda; Yuusuke Kaidai
- Written by: Gō Zappa (Note: Series composition and screenplay); Yuniko Ayana (Note: Screenplay)
- Music by: Ryōhei Sataka
- Studio: Sanzigen
- Licensed by: NA: Sentai Filmworks (streaming and home video) Crunchyroll (Note: Through Crunchyroll (formerly known as Funimation).) (streaming); SA/SEA: Medialink
- Original network: Tokyo MX, CTC, tvk, BS NTV, AT-X, Sun TV, KBS Kyoto, TUY, tys, MRT, RKB, HAB, TV Aichi
- English network: SEA: Aniplus Asia
- Original run: October 30, 2020 – January 29, 2021
- Episodes: 13
- Manga

D4DJ -The Starting of Photon Maiden-
- Illustrated by: Benino Atsu
- Published by: Bushiroad
- Magazine: Monthly Bushiroad
- Original run: November 6, 2020 – September 3, 2021
- Volumes: 3
- Anime television series

D4DJ Petit Mix
- Directed by: Seiya Miyajima
- Written by: Seiya Miyajima
- Music by: Ryōhei Sataka
- Studio: DMM.futureworks; W-Toon Studio
- Original network: Tokyo MX, BS Nittele, KBS Kyoto, Sun TV, tvk, CTC
- Original run: February 5, 2021 – July 30, 2021
- Episodes: 26
- Manga

D4DJ -The Prologue of Peaky P-key-
- Written by: Ichirō Sakaki
- Illustrated by: Mitsuki Meia
- Published by: Bushiroad
- Magazine: Manga Door
- Original run: April 23, 2021 – March 3, 2023
- Volumes: 3
- Anime television series

D4DJ All Mix
- Directed by: Seiji Mizushima (chief); Daisuke Suzuki
- Written by: Go Zappa
- Music by: Ryōhei Sataka
- Studio: Sanzigen
- Licensed by: Crunchyroll: SA/SEA: Medialink
- Original network: Tokyo MX, BS NTV, AT-X, KBS Kyoto, Sun TV
- Original run: January 13, 2023 – March 31, 2023
- Episodes: 12
- icon

D4DJ (Dig Delight Direct Drive DJ) is a Japanese music media franchise created by Bushiroad, with original story by Kō Nakamura. Takaaki Kidani is credited as executive producer. It consists primarily of live disc jockey performances, a rhythm game for smartphones titled D4DJ Groovy Mix and a 13-episode anime television series titled D4DJ First Mix, which aired from October 2020 to January 2021. A spin-off anime series titled D4DJ Petit Mix aired from February to July 2021. A standalone episode titled D4DJ Double Mix premiered in August 2022. A second season titled D4DJ All Mix aired from January to March 2023. In 2024, ownership of the franchise moved to Donuts.

== Plot ==
Upon returning to Japan, first-year high school student Rinku Aimoto enrolls at Yoba Girls' Academy and meets Maho Akashi, the school's broadcaster and DJ. Rinku soon develops an interest in DJing after watching a performance by Yoba's famous DJ unit "Peaky P-key", and she and Maho form a group of their own called "Happy Around!". They are later joined by Muni Ohnaruto, a talented illustrator, and Rei Togetsu, a pianist.

== Characters ==
=== Happy Around! ===
The latest idol-themed DJ unit from Yoba Academy. The name comes from Rinku's catchphrase, which she habitually says whenever she is joyfully spinning around. Their primary music genre style is a combination of J-pop and dubstep. They also use happy hardcore and gabber.

Rinku Aimoto (愛本 りんく, Aimoto Rinku)
Voiced by: Yūka Nishio (Japanese); Emi Lo (English)
Having lived in Africa as a child due to her parents' work, Rinku finally returned to Japan prior to starting high school and currently lives with her grandparents. On her first day of school, Maho introduced her to DJ activities by inviting her to a performance by Peaky P-key. She was then inspired to create her own DJ unit alongside Maho. An optimist who can be an oddball at times, she can sense how certain musical pieces can connect by moving her body, so she serves as Happy Around!'s lead singer and dancer. Later, she deeply values her friendship with Muni, to the point she can even cry when her relationship with Muni strained. Her name is a play on the word "link".
Maho Akashi (明石 真秀, Akashi Maho)
Voiced by: Karin Kagami (Japanese and English)
A school DJ broadcaster under the name "Mash", Maho started her DJ activity after watching an outdoor concert when she was a little girl. She initially attempted to reject Rinku's DJ unit invitation until she realized how seriously Rinku is about it. She is skilled at cooking and doing housework because she has younger siblings.
Muni Ohnaruto (大鳴門 むに, Ōnaruto Muni)
Voiced by: Haruka Mimura (Japanese); Lily Ki (English)
An illustrator and VJ under the name "VJ Only", Muni has been attracting attention on the internet thanks to her drawings. She takes her art seriously, even though she does not accept criticism kindly. She is Rinku's childhood friend, and reluctantly decides to join her unit upon being invited, but almost pulls out from her maiden appearance due to stage fright. Muni wears a rabbit-ear headband on her head and carries a cat plush called Nyochio during performances and in school.
Rei Togetsu (渡月 麗, Togetsu Rei)
Voiced by: Kanon Shizaki (2019–2022), Maiko Irie (2022–present) (Japanese); Anairis Quiñones (English)
Being born to a wealthy family, Rei had lessons in all sorts of activities and she is gifted to the piano. However, her parents set strict expectations that she wishes to be freed from. She serves as the group's composer and arranger. It is implied that in the past, she also attended a similar outdoor DJ concert like Maho, though the two did not know each other at the time.

=== Peaky P-key ===
A popular hip hop-themed DJ unit in Yoba Academy. It was formed during their middle school years. Also known as Peaky, their music style is a combination of techno, hip hop, and electro-pop.

Kyoko Yamate (山手 響子, Yamate Kyōko)
Voiced by: Aimi (Japanese); Christie Cate (English)
Kyoko is the charismatic leader of Peaky P-key. Born in a musical family, she has a natural talent for music. She later develops an admiration for Happy Around! after she watched their first show.
Shinobu Inuyose (犬寄 しのぶ, Inuyose Shinobu)
Voiced by: Miyu Takagi (Japanese); Divi Muse (English)
A DJ who is the brainy one of Peaky P-key. She and Kyoko have known each other since childhood, though Shinobu constantly rejects Kyoko's requests to form a unit until middle school; since then, they have maintained a close bond together. Besides being a skilled DJ, she also excels in remixing and track-making. On the outside of her DJ activity, she enjoys online gaming.
Yuka Jennifer Sasago (笹子・ジェニファー・由香, Sasago Jenifā Yuka)
Voiced by: Moeka Koizumi (Japanese); Brianna Knickerbocker (English)
Yuka is the moodmaker of Peaky P-key. She met Kyoko as she was searching for the "greatest moment" to capture with her camera and decided to join the unit as a VJ. Raised by parents who work as gym trainers, she is very cheerful and kind to everyone, and loves to cheer up her fellow group members whom she regards as her best friends.
Esora Shimizu (清水 絵空, Shimizu Esora)
Voiced by: Reo Kurachi (Japanese); Kayli Mills (English)
The self-proclaimed "lovely-type" member of Peaky P-key. As a natural-born entertainer, she joined the unit to bring entertainment to anyone, and is even willing to expend her own fortune to achieve her goals. She is skilled at getting people to let their guards down and speak their minds. Esora is also a childhood friend of Lyrical Lily member Kurumi.

=== Photon Maiden ===
A sci-fi-themed DJ unit working under an entertainment agency and consisting of students at Yoba. Their music style is a combination of trance, techno, and dance music.

Saki Izumo (出雲 咲姫, Izumo Saki)
Voiced by: Risa Tsumugi (Japanese); Deneen Melody (English)
Saki is a talented girl who excels in studies and sports. Due to having "synesthesia", she can see color in music. Despite her outstanding skills, Saki's personality looks like a doll, rarely showing emotion unless she is on the stage.
Ibuki Niijima (新島 衣舞紀, Nījima Ibuki)
Voiced by: Ami Maeshima (2019–2022), Kanon Nanaki (2022–present) (Japanese); Heather Gonzalez (English)
The athletic leader of Photon Maiden, Ibuki has participated in many sports since childhood. In junior high, she became hooked on the joyfulness of dancing and singing and started to attend a show production school.
Towa Hanamaki (花巻 乙和, Hanamaki Towa)
Voiced by: Haruki Iwata (Japanese); Brittany Lauda (English)
Towa attends the local festivals due to her family's participation in the local youth organization. As a huge idol enthusiast, she still goes to idol concerts and tries to learn from their performances. She loves sweets, but is often scolded by Ibuki for wanting to eat high-calorie foods before performances.
Noa Fukushima (福島 ノア, Fukushima Noa)
Voiced by: Hinata Satō (Japanese); Michelle Marie (English)
Noa became interested in theater thanks to her love of literature, and decided to become a performer when she was praised at a theater workshop. Very curious and knowledgeable, she becomes talkative when it comes to things she is interested in. She also kidnapped Lyrical Lily in an episode of Petit Mix, and also has an unhealthy obsession with Muni.

=== Merm4id ===
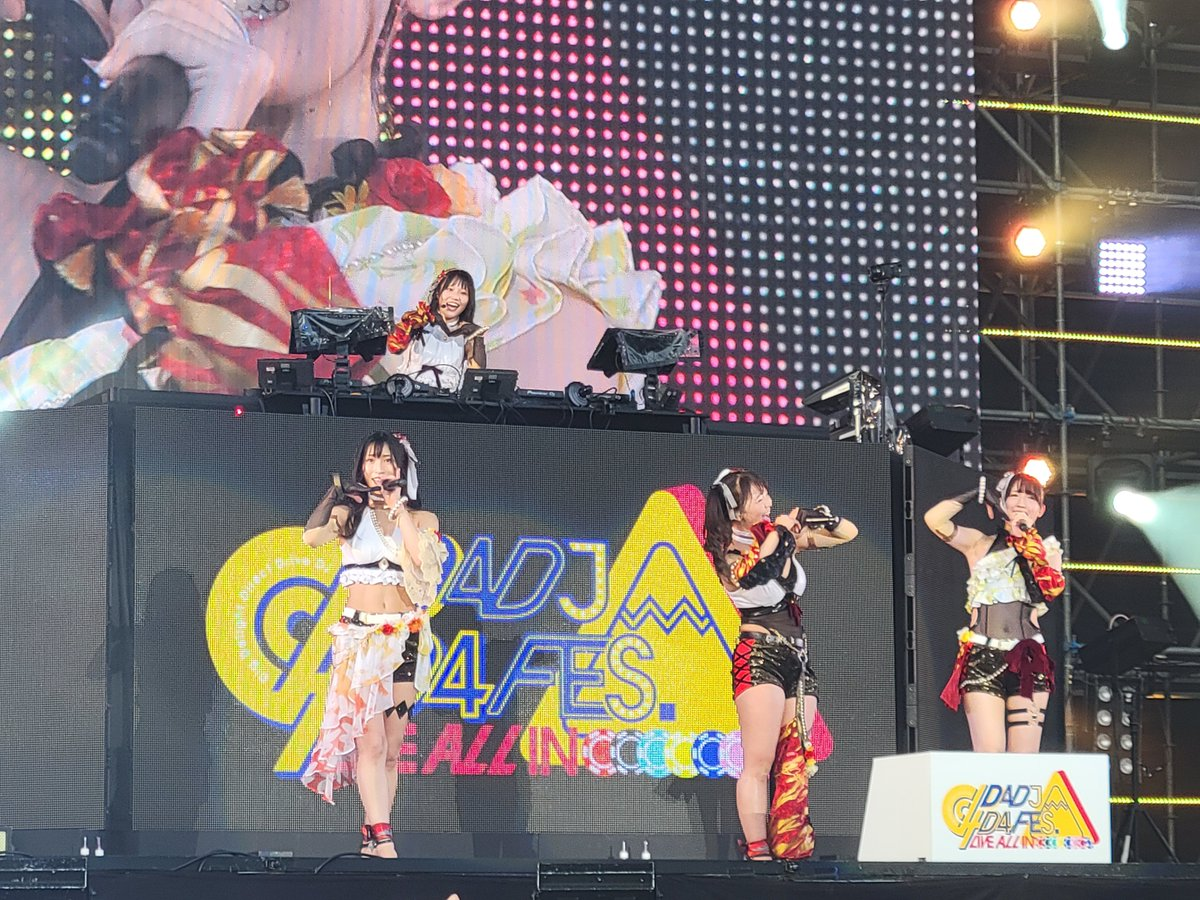
Merm4id

A glamorous tropical-themed DJ unit formed by first-year students at Seiho University, who aspire to become famous like Photon Maiden. Their music genre consists of electro house and progressive trance.

Rika Seto (瀬戸 リカ, Seto Rika)
Voiced by: Natsumi Hirajima, Ayasa Itō (young) (Japanese); Kira Buckland (English)
Holding "Life is to enjoy!" as her motto, Rika leads a positive university life. She loves to dance and sing with her friends at parties. She started her DJ activities with her best friend Marika along with Saori and Dalia whom she met by chance.
Marika Mizushima (水島 茉莉花, Mizushima Marika)
Voiced by: Mei Okada (Japanese); Kelly Baskin (English)
Marika is an easygoing person who likes to comfort. Besides being a university student, she also works as a model. She was the center of attention upon entering university, but she became friends with Rika, who was able to talk to her despite all the attention.
Saori Hidaka (日高 さおり, Hidaka Saori)
Voiced by: Himari Hazuki (2019–2025), Iroha Sakurada (2025–present) (Japanese); Jackie Lastra (English)
Saori started her DJ career in high school, and due to her hard-working nature, she has built up a certain level of technique. Her negative thinking held her back from DJing actively, even as a university student. Rika forced her to join the unit, but has made up her mind to change her mentality and achieve her goals.
Dalia Matsuyama (松山 ダリア, Matsuyama Daria)
Voiced by: Ai Negishi (Japanese); Lauren Landa (English)
Dalia devotes herself to practicing ballet, traditional Japanese dance, contemporary dance, and any other form in order to become a dancer. Also, she acts as the bodyguard of the unit.

=== RONDO ===
A gothic rock-themed group consisting of first-year Seiho University students who work at a famous club called "ALTER-EGO". Their music style is mainly a combination of trance and rock with touch of drum and bass.

Tsubaki Aoyagi (青柳 椿, Aoyagi Tsubaki)
Voiced by: Rihona Kato, Mikoi Sasaki (young) (Japanese); Madeline Dorroh (English)
A born vocalist who has been humming melodies for as long as she can remember. Tsubaki was asked to join the DJ unit, which was lacking a vocalist, by Aoi, and quickly attracted attention as soon as she joined. It is implied to varying degrees that she developed a crush on Aoi due to her handsome looks and prince-like personality.
Nagisa Tsukimiyama (月見山 渚, Tsukimiyama Nagisa)
Voiced by: Sae Ōtsuka (2019–2024), Shuri Miyumi (2024–present) (Japanese); Lizzie Freeman (English)
Nagisa is Shinobu's cousin who grew up in a rock music family. She came across the club where Aoi performed as a DJ when she was searching for a place to practice, and often visits Hiiro's house as well.
Hiiro Yano (矢野 緋彩, Yano Hīro)
Voiced by: Haruna Momono (Japanese); Natalie Hoover (English)
The most mature member of Rondo. As a VJ, her knowledge in art allows her to build the unique worldview of the unit.
Aoi Miyake (三宅 葵依, Miyake Aoi)
Voiced by: Tsunko (Japanese); Justine Huxley (English)
Aoi is a DJ that performs exclusively for a members-only club. She took interest in Tsubaki's singing skill and asked her to form a DJ unit.

=== Lyrical Lily ===
A lolita-themed DJ unit from Arisugawa Academy, a prestigious all-girls Catholic school. Their music style is a combination of synth-pop, house, and classical music.

Miyu Sakurada (桜田 美夢, Sakurada Miyu)
Voiced by: Hazuki Tanda
Miyu is a kind-hearted person with a good conduct. She started her DJ activities when she came across some analog equipment with her friends. She loves singing, and is well-versed in popular songs from the Showa era as well as nostalgic music due to her family's influence.
Haruna Kasuga (春日 春奈, Kasuga Haruna)
Voiced by: Amane Shindō
Haruna is an earnest girl who belongs to her high school's disciplinary committee. Her soft nature always gets her involved in all sorts of trouble.
Kurumi Shiratori (白鳥 胡桃, Shiratori Kurumi)
Voiced by: Ruka Fukagawa
Kurumi is Esora's childhood friend. She is a cheerful girl who loves fun stuffs and is bored of attending a strict school for children of rich and prestigious families, Kurumi always looks for the ways to create some kind of mischief.
Miiko Takeshita (竹下 みいこ, Takeshita Miiko)
Voiced by: Yuzuki Watase
Like Kurumi, Miiko is a cheerful girl who loves to make friends, play and she also loves her fellow members of Lyrical Lily. She has a dream about traveling all over the world and making friends in many different countries, demonstrated by her ability to understand English. However, she is also passionate to the pranks caused by Kurumi and often she helps Kurumi to prank the others, including Haruna.

=== Call of Artemis ===
A former high school DJ unit that disbanded prior to First Mix, due to creative differences.

Airi Amano (天野 愛莉, Amano Airi)
Voiced by: Nana Mizuki (Japanese); Kelly Baskin (English)
Airi is a waitress working at the Cafe Vinyl. Eight years prior to the start of the series, she was part of a DJ unit group consisting of herself and three other members. When the four split, she later joined Mana to form Scarlet Canary.
Mana Kase (嘉瀬 茉奈, Kase Mana)
Voiced by: Arisa Komiya
Mana is a former member of a DJ unit consisting of herself and three other members.
Shano Himegami (姫神 紗乃, Himegami Shano)
Voiced by: Raychell (Japanese); Lauren Landa (English)
Shano is a former member of a DJ group consisting of herself and three other members. She is now working as a music producer and is a person who founded Photon Maiden.
Tōka Takao (高尾 灯佳, Takao Tōka)
Voiced by: Hinako Umemura
Tōka is a former member of a DJ group consisting of herself and three others. She later joins Shano to form Lynx Eyes.

=== UniChØrd ===
A pop-house DJ unit formed by Michiru Kaibara at the request of Lumina Ichihoshi. Their cosmic aesthetic is relatively close to Photon Maiden's, however, with a lighter and more cheerful style. Although queer or vaguely queer characters have been in the franchise before, this is the first unit to include members who are in an openly lesbian relationship.

Michiru Kaibara (海原 ミチル, Kaibara Michiru)
Voiced by: Kotori Koiwai
Michiru is an independent DJ player and the childhood friend of Shinobu prior to Shinobu's involvement in Peaky. She aims to best Shinobu and tends to have weird and overreacting expressions. Michiru is later invited to form a unit consisting of herself and three other girls, becoming the DJ for the unit.
Lumina Ichihoshi (一星 ルミナ, Ichihoshi Rumina)
Voiced by: Karin Takahashi
A popular virtual singer who invites Michiru, Kokoa, and Hayate to form a DJ unit with her. She later reveals herself to be an AI, her data being based on the deceased singer Aria. She is later given a robotic humanoid body to live in.
Kokoa Shinomiya (四ノ宮 心愛, Shinomiya Kokoa)
Voiced by: Akari Yura
A sharp-tongued first-year honors student at Arisugawa Academy who is invited to form a DJ unit consisting of herself and two other girls. She holds a grudge against Michiru for something she did to her in her past. She is in a romantic relationship with Hayate.
Hayate Tendo (天堂 はやて, Tendo Hayate)
Voiced by: Yuuki Temma
A poetic first-year student at Arisugawa Academy who has a habit of saying what's on her mind. She is invited to form a DJ unit consisting of herself and two other girls. She is in a romantic relationship with Kokoa.

=== Abyssmare ===
A gothic-themed American DJ unit backed by Sho Mitsuhashi that will go up against the DJ units of Japan. They are referred only by first name, and their real names or last names are yet to be revealed.

Neo (ネオ)
Voiced by: May'n
The cool-headed leader and vocalist of Abyssmare. A musical prodigy since she was young, Neo was scouted by Sho to help her achieve her dream to become the world's greatest vocalist. She is the daughter of Aria, a deceased singer whose voice inspired Airi Amano to follow her path.
Sophia (ソフィア, Sofia)
Voiced by: Yūka Aisaka
The mood-reader and DJ of Abyssmare. She has low self-esteem due to her poor upbringing to the point where she almost committed suicide. She would later develop an unhealthy obsession with Neo after her voice allegedly saved Sophia's life.
Elsie (エルシィ, Erushī)
Voiced by: Tomomi Jiena Sumi
The dancer and chorus, as well as the self-proclaimed "number 2" of Abyssmare. A cunning and intelligent woman despite her petite stature, she also has a group of bodyguards that wait on her command. She often gets into arguments with Weronika.
Weronika (ヴェロニカ, Veronika)
Voiced by: Misuzu Yamada
The dancer and subvocal for Abyssmare. In spite of her short temper, she is shown to have a soft spot towards children, especially her younger siblings. She has strong one-sided rivalry with Neo and often gets into arguments with Elsie.

=== A Bad Cynic Doggo ===
A spin-off unit appearing in D4DJ Groovy Mix. They were first introduced in A Bad Cynic Doggo VOL.1. They mostly perform in Club DOGHOUSE.

Eimi Azai (浅井 詠実, Azai Eimi)
Voiced by: Yurie Igoma
While her knowledge of music is just barely average, her impertinent and foul-mouthed nature is on another level. She is skilled at stirring up others, her vocabulary consists of wide range of words from academic vocabulary to internet slang, and she is always spouting inappropriate remarks. Due to her subservient personality, Eimi dislikes and has a one-sided inferiority complex towards the sparkling Yoba Academy, and especially Rinku Aimoto.
Bell Bessho (別所 美鈴, Bessho Beru)
Voiced by: Saya Aizawa
Bell's father is the owner of Club Dog House. Having helped out at the club ever since she was young, Bell knows how to handle DJing and sound equipment as well as creating promotional materials and merchandise. She is always smiling, but very strict when it comes to money and expenses.
Shika Shimazu (島津 詩歌, Shimazu Shika)
Voiced by: Konomi Tamura
A talented musician ever since she was young, Shika gained some recognition as a turntablist. However, as she started fully devoting herself to music, she ended up becoming even more lost and obsessed with all sorts of subcultures. She is a closet fan of Kyoko Yamate.
Date-chan (伊達ちゃん)
Voiced by: Akira Sekine
An erratic girl whose age and real name are unknown. For some reason, she is the only member who is repeating a grade. For better or worse, she's almighty and proficient when it comes to music - whether it be track making, arranging songs, rapping, and controlling the flow, she can do it all. While she is mostly slow-going, she has a habit of experiencing highs after inhaling sugar.

=== EGOEGG ===
EGOEGG is an all-female DJ group in the Dig Delight Direct Drive DJ franchise. They were first introduced on the DIGGLER'S HIGH official sites.

Hare Kanda (神田 はれ, Kanda Hare)
Voiced by: Sakura Yoshida (2024–2025), Momoka Shirosaki
An overbearing, self-centered, and perpetually hungry unemployed woman. During her high school days, she encounters a DJ and decides to form the unit EGOEGG. After a three-year hiatus, she sets out to revive the unit. She hates when things don't follow her pace and is notorious for having a harsh and curt way of speaking and treating others.
Raika Shiodome (汐留 ライカ, Shiodome Raika)
Voiced by: Momoka Udagawa
A young and haughty college student with an intense need for approval. A former child actress, she's all for being appreciated and fawned over. Due to her high pride, she can't be satisfied unless she's number one in everything. However, she's very easy to provoke, leading to her constantly butting heads with Hare.
Jiu Tanimachi (谷町 慈雨, Tanimachi Jiu)
Voiced by: Mio Aoi (2024–2025), Yū Shirono
A laid-back and easygoing gyaru with a knack for lying. She has an elusive nature that makes her quite hard to read. She follows a personal philosophy that as long as she's having fun in the moment, then that's all she needs. Though she presents herself as a "battle junkie" who constantly craves intense, all-out clashes, in reality, she's a "defeat fanatic" who gets off on taking losses.
Mikumo Ichinohashi (一ノ橋 美雲, Ichinohashi Mikumo)
Voiced by: Miu Koshiba (2024–2025), Momonosuke
A mysterious woman working as a professional novelist. She longs to have equal relationships with people, though she tends to be excessive with physical affection. Even so, she can be quite bold and forward, and often surprises those around her.

=== Other characters ===
Ryujin Kofune (小舟 柳人, Kofune Ryujin)
Voiced by: Tōru Furuya (Japanese); Tony Oliver (English)
Ryujin is the bartender and owner of Cafe Vinyl. Eight years prior to the start of the series, he was part of the DJ group LM.O., consisting of himself and four other members, including Shinobu's grandfather.
Dennojo Inuyose (犬寄 傳之丞, Inuyose Dennojo)
Voiced by: Naoto Takenaka (Japanese); D.C. Douglas (English)
Dennoji is a former DJ and former member of the DJ group LM.O. consisting of himself and four other members. He is also Shinobu's grandfather and served as a big inspiration for her.
Ku Mitsuhashi (三橋 空, Mitsuhashi Kū)
Voiced by: Daigo (Japanese); Michael Christopher (Note: Credited as Mickey Caputo) (English)
Ku is the son of Sho Mitsuhashi, a former member of the DJ group LM.O, as well as the first host of the revived D4 FES.
Haruki Kaibara (海原 ハルキ, Kaibara Haruki)
Voiced by: Hisanori Yoshida (Japanese); Brandon Winckler (English)
Haruki is a DJ and former member of the DJ group LM.O. consisting of himself and four other members. He is also Michiru's uncle.
Masaki (真咲)
Voiced by: Houko Kuwashima^{Double Mix credits}
Masaki is the general manager of Alter-Ego, the nightclub that RONDO regularly performs at. Her past, as well as her connections to other people, are a mystery to even the members of RONDO.
Laura Bradley (ローラ・ブラッドリー, Rōra Buraddorī)
Voiced by: Shu Uchida
Laura is an English-speaking American DJ maker who befriends Saori on the internet and is the one who offers Saori to make a joint DJ music collaboration.
Sakuya Ennouji (園能寺咲耶, Ennōji Sakuya)
Voiced by: Erika Ishitobi
Sakuya is the student council president of Arisugawa Academy. She has a strict personality and she often places tradition and order above everything, seeing Lyrical Lily's DJ activities as a threat to tradition. She considers Haruna Kasuga to be her rival.
Ayumi Kuon (久遠愛弓, Kuon Ayumi)
Voiced by: Hikaru Akao
Ayumi is the vice president of Arisugawa Academy's student council and a childhood friend of Sakuya. While she has a calm demeanor, she also harbors a manipulative side to her, wanting Sakuya to be dependent on her only.
Hitomi Nakamori (中森瞳, Nakamori Hitomi)
Voiced by: Chiharu
Hitomi is the secretary of Arisugawa Academy's student council. She is a shy girl who once had an interest in DJ-ing.
Riaru Haraguchi (原口莉亞瑠, Haraguchi Riaru)
Voiced by: Rimi Nishimoto
Riaru is the general affairs clerk of Arisugawa Academy's student council. She is talented student with a fixation of "ojou-samas" and their high-class lifestyle. Riaru claims to be descended from a ninja clan.

== Media ==
=== Anime ===
An anime television series titled D4DJ First Mix was first announced in 2019. The series was animated by Sanzigen and directed by Seiji Mizushima. While the first episode had an early debut on October 22, 2020, the series officially aired from October 30, 2020, to January 29, 2021, on Tokyo MX, BS NTV, and other channels. Happy Around! performed the opening theme "Guru Guru DJ TURN!!" (ぐるぐるDJ TURN!!), while Nana Mizuki and Raychell performed the ending theme, which is a cover of "WOW WAR TONIGHT ~Toki niwa Okose yo Movement~" (WOW WAR TONIGHT～時には起こせよムーヴメント～) by H Jungle with T.

Bushiroad announced worldwide streaming, including in North America, Funimation, Crunchyroll, and Sentai Filmworks, the latter also releasing the series on Blu-ray in the future, plus Hidive streaming on more parts of the world. Medialink has also licensed the series and streamed it on its Ani-One YouTube channel in South Asia and Southeast Asia. Aniplus Asia simulcasted the series in Southeast Asia.

An English dub produced by Bang Zoom! Entertainment began streaming on January 16, 2021.

D4DJ Petit Mix, a spin-off chibi anime short series, aired from February 5 to July 30, 2021. Seiya Miyajima directed and oversaw the series' scripts at DMM.futureworks and W-Toon Studio. The series' theme is "Petit Mix Party Night!" by Happy Around!.

On March 13, 2022, a special episode titled D4DJ Double Mix was announced. Seiji Mizushima served as chief director, while Daisuke Suzuki served as director. It premiered on August 19, 2022.

On April 8, 2022, a second season titled D4DJ All Mix was announced. It features six music groups including Lyrical Lily. The staff reprised their roles with Daisuke Suzuki directing and Seiji Mizushima returning as chief director. It aired from January 13 to March 31, 2023. Lyrical Lily performed the opening theme "Maihime", while various cast members performed the ending theme "Around and Around".

==== Episode list ====
===== D4DJ First Mix =====
No.	Title	Directed by (Note: Information is taken from the ending credits of each episode.)	Written by	Original release date
1	"First Mix"	Shinpei Ishikawa	Gō Zappa	October 30, 2020 (Note: It had an early debut on October 22, 2020.)
It is the first day of school for Rinku Aimoto, who had recently moved back to Japan after living abroad in Africa. During lunch, she overhears a familiar song over the intercom that she traces to DJ and broadcaster Maho Akashi. Rinku expresses interest in how DJing works, prompting Maho to take her to a performance by Peaky P-key that inspires her to start her own unit. While Maho is initially put off by Rinku's repeated offers to join her, she eventually agrees to help and teach Rinku the basics.
2	"Next Step"	Daichi Ōmori	Gō Zappa	November 6, 2020
Maho teaches Rinku about song transitions, but Rinku's enthusiasm prompts Maho to suggest that Rinku should be the group's dancer. The two later put up a promotional poster that fails to generate interest until Maho learns about a remix contest. Despite not placing in the top five, Maho receives an honorable mention which helps draw attention to her unit's upcoming live show. The performance, with Maho as the DJ and Rinku as the singer, is eventually successful.
3	"Only Me"	Naoya Okugawa	Gō Zappa	November 13, 2020
Muni Ohnaruto attends Maho and Rinku's concert, which evokes memories of being childhood friends with the latter. Although her initial attempts to talk to Rinku fail, she encounters her and Maho at a café and intervenes when she disapproves of Maho's proposed promotional poster. A new poster by Muni receives positive reviews and Rinku invites her to join the group as a VJ. On the day of their show, Muni runs away after having a nightmare of developing stage fright before a play as a child. Rinku finds her at the playground where they used to spend time together and, as she had done when they were younger, motivates her to return in time for the performance.
4	"Make My Song"	Motomu Endō, Kengo Hayashi	Gō Zappa	November 20, 2020
Looking for more ways to gain popularity ahead of the school festival's Sunset Stage competition, the group enters a songwriting contest organized by Photon Maiden. Rinku volunteers to learn the piano to create a melody for the song, and she catches the attention of Rei Togetsu, a pianist who regularly practices in the school's music room. Rei agrees to teach Rinku how to play, but Maho points out that it would be more efficient to have Rei compose the melody herself. Although the song fails to win the contest, the four decide to use it for themselves.
5	"One and Only"	Kentarō Shiga	Gō Zappa	November 27, 2020
Although the group continues to grow in popularity, Muni is peeved about receiving no attention beyond her VJ title and wants to increase her presence by singing an image song. Unsure of how to compose the ideal song, Rei visits Muni's house for a sleepover, where they bond but Rei continues to struggle with writing. Although the song is disorganized, the group decides to proceed and invites Rei to join them onstage as a keyboardist. After their concert, the four formally change the unit name to "Happy Around!" as a reference to Rinku's catchphrase. To Muni's chagrin, her peers focus their praise on Rei instead.
6	"Fall Camp"	Shinpei Ishikawa	Gō Zappa	December 4, 2020
With finals on the horizon yet much of Happy Around! struggling in their classes, they plan a study session at Rei's house. Despite her wealthy background, she proposes making curry similar to the instant meal she had during her sleepover with Muni. When Rei purchases the wrong meat and curry roux, Maho suggests cooking beef stew instead. After dinner, the girls relax until Maho recalls their reason for organizing the meeting, leading to late-night studying. Nevertheless, the others pass their exams and they celebrate a celebratory concert.
Special	"Happy Around! First Live Commemorative Special"; Transliteration: "Happy Around! 1st Live Kaisai Kinen Tokubetsu-hen" (Japanese: Happy Around! 1st LIVE開催記念 特別編)	N/A	N/A	December 11, 2020
A recap episode that summarizes the first six episodes and the real-life concerts.
7	"Holy Gifts"	Yūya Yano	Gō Zappa	December 18, 2020
Happy Around! wants to perform on Christmas Day, but Maho is unable to schedule a concert on the day. While Rinku mopes by eating, she meets Kyoko Yamate, the leader of Peaky P-key. Kyoko, who had been watching Happy Around!, invites her to attend Peaky P-key's upcoming Christmas live and explains such shows are held to spread the festive spirit as the unit was formed on the holiday. During the concert, Kyoko asks Rinku to perform with Peaky P-key. Afterwards, while Muni and Rei praise Rinku, Maho is visibly distraught.
8	"Dear Friend"	Motomu Endō	Gō Zappa	December 25, 2020
Maho fears Rinku is being recruited to join Peaky P-key, and her worries are exacerbated by misunderstandings of conversations between the group and Rinku, particularly the latter maintaining a secret with Kyoko. She meets Shinobu Inuyose, Peaky P-key's DJ, and asks if Rinku is indeed switching units; although Shinobu is also unaware of such plans, she encourages Maho to make music better than hers to entice Rinku into staying. Shinobu reminisces about how Peaky P-key was formed, recalling that Kyoko had been a longtime fan who struggled to compose tracks that would consistently build excitement (hence the term "Peaky") before agreeing to start a unit together. After Happy Around! performs their new song, Kyoko gives the group seashell accessories, which she and Rinku reveal they had commissioned as reciprocation for the latter's guest appearance at Peaky P-key's show.
9	"Encounter With Light"	Kentarō Shiga	Gō Zappa	January 1, 2021
Happy Around! reaches eighth place in the Sunset Stage rankings to qualify for the competition, but their position is jeopardized by the rise of Photon Maiden. After Photon Maiden's latest performance, the two groups are tied for the rank and are subject to a one-on-one "Battle Mix Party" to break the tie. Needing an especially impressive song to give them a boost, Rei composes a series of melodies, though her preferred piece is shelved as the others feel it does not fit their image. While they proceed with a song that Rinku is comfortable with singing, Rei continues to mull over her favored melody before figuring that she could sing it herself.
10	"Brand New World"	Daichi Ōmori	Gō Zappa	January 8, 2021
Rinku walks in on Rei singing her song and encourages her to perform it at the Battle Mix Party. While Rei is initially hesitant as she fears the song does not match the unit's image, she agrees upon receiving the others' blessings. As Happy Around! and Photon Maiden prepare their new songs, Rinku encounters and befriends Photon Maiden's Towa Hanamaki. After the groups play their songs, Happy Around! is voted as the winner.
11	"Voice of Evolution"	Yūya Yano	Gō Zappa	January 15, 2021
While listening to Happy Around!'s winning song, Photon Maiden's Saki Izumo senses a new, calmer color in their music rather than the usual bright hues. She enters the upcoming remix contest and fails to win, but her track catches Maho's attention; after Saki follows her and is caught, Maho explains although she enjoys the remix, it is too disorganized. Maho expresses surprise at Saki's inexperience with remixing, to which she reveals that Photon Maiden's songs are selected by their producer to align with their persona, though she wants to create her own music. The rest of her unit agree to play her remix at their next show, and despite concerns that the producer would reject it, it is ultimately accepted; further worries about the song's reception among fans are quelled when they garner positive reactions upon performing.
12	"Childhood Friends"	Daichi Ōmori	Yuniko Ayana	January 22, 2021
Rinku suggests performing a rap battle with Muni at the Sunset Stage, to Muni's apprehension. When Rinku struggles to freestyle rap, she visits Muni's house to practice and work out on her exercise game as she had previously promised, which irks Muni. Rinku abruptly hands the game's controls to Muni ahead of a boss battle to answer a phone call from Towa; afterwards, an upset Muni prompts Rinku to leave. The next day, Rinku's difficulties continue and Muni walks out. Later, Muni confides in Rei that she feels guilty for breaking her own promise with Rinku to write each other letters after the latter moved to Africa. Hoping to help, Rei and Maho organize a rap battle for the childhood friends to voice their thoughts. Muni begins by expressing her frustration with Rinku prioritizing her popularity over her, to which Rinku answers she had always kept Muni and the group in mind; when Rinku mentions the broken promise, Muni admits she had stopped writing as the letters made them feel more distanced and was too afraid to apologize; as the song transitions into musical verse, the two confess their desires to reconnect and make amends.
13	"Groovy Mix"	Daisuke Suzuki	Yuniko Ayana	January 29, 2021
Happy Around! is pitted against Peaky P-key in the Sunset Stage's first round, to the former's dismay before being motivated as it is their best opportunity to face the latter. The group continues practicing at Rinku's house, where they reminisce about their formation, and attends the Yoba Festival, where Maho openly challenges Shinobu ahead of their competition. The two units perform new songs and Peaky P-key advances, eventually going on to win the tournament. After the Sunset Stage, Happy Around! further recalls their journey before being invited—along with Peaky P-key—to an afterparty held by Photon Maiden.

===== D4DJ Petit Mix =====
No.	Title	Directed by	Written by	Original release date
1	"An Invitation From Beyond"; Transliteration: "Kanata Kara no Shōtaijō" (Japanese: 彼方からの招待状)	Motoki Nakanishi	Seiya Miyajima	February 5, 2021
The six units are introduced at the Unknown Underground Unbelievable Ultimate Fes. (U4 Fes.), a mysterious music festival that takes place once every 100 years. Happy Around! receives its invitation in the mail, and although the four agree to participate, Rei notices the lack of a return address.
2	"Happy Dance Hustle!"; Transliteration: "Happī Dansu de Uh! Ha! Uh! Ha!" (Japanese: ハッピーダンスで ウッ！ハッ！ウッ！ハッ！)	Motoki Nakanishi	Haruka	February 12, 2021
While Maho ponders what Happy Around! needs to improve on, Rinku suggests dancing. After the four attempt to follow popular dances and fail, Rinku proclaims dancing is about being passionate and creates an image of Africa with the unit dressed in animal costumes. Happy Around! emulates The Lion King with their dance, ending with Muni raising Nyochio.
3	"Peaky P-key's Double Strategy"; Transliteration: "Pikipiki no Dokidoki! Kaedama Daisakusen" (Japanese: ピキピキのドキドキ！替え玉大作戦)	Motoki Nakanishi	Gigaemon Ichikawa	February 19, 2021
Peaky P-key's popularity draws the media to them for interviews, which reaches the point where they interfere with the unit's practice and daily lives. With a concert approaching, Esora creates robot counterparts of the four that participate in the press functions while the actual girls practice. Shortly before the performance, the four notice the robots have been severely worn down and tearfully give their blessings as they go on stage.
4	"Photon Maiden's Cosmic Color Analysis"; Transliteration: "Photon Maiden no Kozumikku-iro Shindan" (Japanese: Photon Maidenのコズミック色診断)	Motoki Nakanishi	Gigaemon Ichikawa	February 26, 2021
As Saki's synesthesia enables her to see colors in music and other people, she analyzes her fellow Photon Maiden members. To their horror, they are represented by a bright red color due to unexpectedly fiery personality traits that override their typical, calmer characteristics, prompting them to experiment with ways to look cooler. The unit asks Saki about her own color, but she opts to remain quiet after noticing the "color" is outer space.
5	"Hype! Merm4id Video Conference"; Transliteration: "Ten'age! Merm4id Rimōto Kaigi" (Japanese: テンアゲ！Merm4idリモート会議)	Motoki Nakanishi	Gigaemon Ichikawa	March 5, 2021
Merm4id holds a video meeting to discuss ways to improve their shows. However, they are constantly distracted by matters such as Rika arriving late after connecting to a different conference, Dalia petting her cat, Marika ordering food, and Saori's feed experiencing connectivity issues. The meeting descends into further disarray when the four try to exercise to work off their food and notice they had each been wearing sweatpants.
6	"Rondo Nightmares"; Transliteration: "Rondo no Akumu" (Japanese: 燐舞曲の悪夢)	Motoki Nakanishi	Haruka	March 12, 2021
Following Rondo's performance, Nagisa is perturbed about nightmares she has been having lately involving her fellow unit members: Aoi eats a giant flan Nagisa had been saving for herself, Hiiro scolds her for 24 hours, and Tsubaki enlarges and goes on a rampage during a concert. Hiiro concludes Nagisa is under extreme stress and points out her mistakes during the show. Hoping to alleviate her stress, the four agree to follow Hiiro's plan of using fortunes. A week later, Rondo performs in plaid costumes, to Tsubaki's embarrassment.
7	"Lyrical Lily's Delightful Snack Time"; Transliteration: "Meshimase Riri Riri ♪ Gokigen Oyatsu" (Japanese: 召しませリリリリ♪ご機嫌おやつ)	Motoki Nakanishi	Haruka	March 19, 2021
Kurumi arrives at Lyrical Lily's afternoon tea party with a large bundle of snacks, many of which are unrecognizable to the rest of the unit. When Haruna questions their safety, Kurumi repeatedly pranks her with snapping gum and popping candy. The others enjoy the snacks and agree to eat them for the rest of the month, but are chided when multiple helicopter loads are delivered to the school.
8	"Road to Legend"; Transliteration: "Maboroshi e no Michi" (Japanese: 幻への道)	Motoki Nakanishi	Haruka	March 26, 2021
Rei reminds Happy Around! about signing up for U4 Fes., especially as they had reached the deadline, but the four are still unable to figure out how to do so. The other units recall finding a QR code watermarked in the invitation that leads to a registration website, though through varying methods: Peaky P-key simply noticed the code, Photon Maiden held the sheet by a stove and the heat exposed it, Rondo solved a puzzle, Rika spilled water on Merm4id's, while Lyrical Lily refuses to disclose how they found it. After Happy Around! attempts each strategy to no avail, Rinku notices the invitation has two sheets, the second of which contains the code. However, they are quickly annoyed when the website requires them to find an alien in a crowd of people before continuing.
9	"Battles of Honor and Muscles: Deadly Fight in Nakano"; Transliteration: "Kinniku Shōjo no Jingi Naki Tatakai 〜Nakano Shitō-hen〜" (Japanese: 筋肉少女の仁義なき戦い〜中野私闘篇〜)	Motoki Nakanishi	Gigaemon Ichikawa	April 2, 2021
At the gym, Maho spots Yuka, Ibuki, and Dalia in a standoff. With commentary by Nagisa and Shinobu, the three begin competing against one another to perform the most reps in various workout routines. When they prepare to engage in a final battle, Maho attempts to intervene before they pose in front of the crowd, to her confusion.
10	"Singing Voice Conference"; Transliteration: "Utagoe♡Himitsu Kaigi" (Japanese: 歌声♡ひみつ会議)	Motoki Nakanishi	Haruka	April 9, 2021
The leaders of the six units convene at Cafe Vinyl to discuss ways to improve their singing. Each girl presents a food that she believes will help their voices: Saki and Tsubaki, respectively, bring apples and honey that the group combine, Kyoko provides oolong tea, Miyu has ginseng (that is turned into a soup), and Rika shows off an assortment of sticky foodstuffs like nattō and nalta jute that Rinku suggests mixing with her rice. The six enjoy their meal and fall asleep, having forgotten why they agreed to meet.
11	"Spa Party"; Transliteration: "Sentō Pātī" (Japanese: せんとうパーティー)	Motoki Nakanishi	Haruka	April 16, 2021
Muni visits a public bathhouse after her tub at home breaks, where she encounters Shinobu. Unfamiliar with its layout, Muni allows Shinobu to give her a tour around the building. In a role-playing game style, the two meet Nagisa, Towa, and Marika at various baths, each of whom join their group. The five run into Aoi at the shower, but Muni, Shinobu, and Nagisa are stunned by her "watermelons" and receive a "game over".
12	"Nyochio and Muni"; Transliteration: "Nyochio to Muni" (Japanese: にょちおとむに)	Motoki Nakanishi	Gigaemon Ichikawa	April 23, 2021
After watching Esora be admired by their peers, Muni is peeved about not being the cutest student in school. Nyochio—which has suddenly gained sentience—offers to help her by selling her badges and sharing her videos online, but they increase Nyochio's popularity instead. At Happy Around!'s next performance, Muni forgets to wear her bunny ears but is still praised for being cute after Nyochio shows up on her head. Muni wakes up and realizes it is a dream before leaving.
13	"Trials of Dreams"; Transliteration: "Yume e no Shiren" (Japanese: 夢への試練)	Motoki Nakanishi	Gigaemon Ichikawa	April 30, 2021
To qualify for U4 Fes., units must pass a preliminary test in which they traverse a mountain cave. After witnessing a unit be eliminated upon being trapped in a cage, Happy Around! encounters obstacles of their own like a rolling boulder, a barrage of arrows, and having to parachute after being launched from the mountain. Peaky P-key explains the traps were intended to gauge units' DJing, to Rinku's understanding and Muni's bewilderment.
14	"Rei's Challenge"; Transliteration: "Rei no Aratanaru Chōsen" (Japanese: 麗の新たなる挑戦)	Motoki Nakanishi	Haruka	May 7, 2021
Hoping to expand Happy Around!'s musical style, Rei expresses interest in trying different instruments. She initially plays traditional Japanese instruments like the taishōgoto, shakuhachi, and ōtsuzumi to great success, but the others raise concerns like the difficulty in incorporating them into their songs. Rinku presents African instruments for her to play, which ultimately prove popular with fans.
15	"Solo Holiday"; Transliteration: "Ohitori-sama Horidē" (Japanese: おひとりさまホリデー)	Motoki Nakanishi	Gigaemon Ichikawa	May 14, 2021
After a show, Peaky P-key agrees to take the next day off. However, Kyoko repeatedly runs across her fellow unit members, and later encounters them in increasingly bizarre situations that include Shinobu fighting with a bear for fish, skydiving with Yuka, and Esora appearing from a submarine. She visits Cafe Vinyl and meets the others again, where she resigns to her fate and sits with them.
16	"Photon Maiden's Galactic Tokyo Exploration"; Transliteration: "Photon Maiden no Gyarakutika Tōkyō Tanbō" (Japanese: Photon Maidenのギャラクティカ東京探訪)	Motoki Nakanishi	Gigaemon Ichikawa	May 21, 2021
Photon Maiden is granted a vacation day ahead of their promotional video shoot, during which Ibuki, Noa, and Towa show Saki around Tokyo. After completing their tour of the city, Saki expresses her wish to travel to outer space with the unit, only to be visited by an alien. The girls offer merchandise they bought in Tokyo to the alien but it continues to approach them until it is revealed to be their producer Shano. She discloses the day off was intended to be the PV shoot itself to show a casual side of the unit, to the disbelief of all but Saki.
17	"Island Survival War"; Transliteration: "Mujintō Sabaibaru Wō" (Japanese: 無人島サバイバル・ウォー)	Motoki Nakanishi	Gigaemon Ichikawa	May 28, 2021
Merm4id becomes stranded on a deserted island while on their way to a resort. In spite of their predicament, the four collect food with ease before assembling a raft. As they depart the island, they are swallowed by a whale before being shot out through its blowhole.
18	"Rondo Love Song"; Transliteration: "Rondo no Renka" (Japanese: 燐舞曲の恋歌)	Motoki Nakanishi	Haruka	June 4, 2021
Rondo is celebrating a successful show with drinks at a rooftop restaurant when Hiiro asks the group if they have experienced something "sweet" recently, though they fail to provide good answers. After Aoi changes the restaurant's background music, the four picture performing the song and Hiiro realizes they were unable to find anything sweet as they already have the unit. Noticing Tsubaki's gaze and her ordering a drink called a Glad Eye, Hiiro points out the definition of a glad-eye, to her embarrassment.
19	"Horror Girls: Final Destination... Terror"; Transliteration: "Senritsu Reijō: Dō Agaite mo... Zekkyō" (Japanese: 戦慄令嬢～どうあがいても。。。絶叫～)	Motoki Nakanishi	Haruka	June 11, 2021
Lyrical Lily is preparing to host a concert in a church when a blackout occurs. After lighting a candle lamp, Haruna attempts to console Miyu and investigate, both of which Miiko and Kurumi point out are common death tropes in horror films. Ghosts appear in the building, scaring Haruna and Miyu until Kurumi turns on the lights and reveals they are a product of her projection mapping as she feels an exorcism theme would fit their show.
20	"Life or Death?! The Battlefield of D"; Transliteration: "Sei ka Shi ka!? Kōya no Hate wa D no Senjō" (Japanese: 生か死か！？荒野の果てはＤの戦場)	Motoki Nakanishi	Haruka	June 18, 2021
In a post-apocalyptic wasteland, Happy Around! is bragging about controlling the world's music when they are attacked by Peaky P-key and their robots. The two units' fight is interrupted by Rondo, who wishes to seize the music for themselves, but are in turn ambushed by Merm4id shooting water at them. Merm4id's own attack is halted when Photon Maiden appears with psychic powers and repeatedly slams the other units into the ground. Lyrical Lily, with powers of motherhood, stops the battle by turning everyone into babies.
21	"Lyrical Dream: Noa Noa Land"; Transliteration: "Ririkaru Dorīmu♪ Noa Noa Rando" (Japanese: りりかるどり～む♪ノアノアランド)	Motoki Nakanishi	Gigaemon Ichikawa	June 25, 2021
Noa encounters Miiko and invites her to an amusement park, where she revels in Miiko's cute behavior before inviting her to her house. She visits Arisugawa Academy, where she is pranked multiple times by Kurumi but enjoys her reactions and also takes her home. The same offer is extended to Haruna, who accepts as she assumes Miiko and Kurumi are causing trouble, and Miyu, who agrees after receiving a straightforward request without reason.
22	"She That Pranks Hiiro Pranks Herself"; Transliteration: "Hiiro Norowaba Ana Fanshī" (Japanese: 緋彩呪わば穴ファンシー)	Motoki Nakanishi	Haruka	July 2, 2021
Kurumi and Miiko attempt to prank Hiiro with a five-phase plan: scare her with a toy tarantula, feed her gulab jamun when she opens her mouth to scream, which is followed by bitter espresso, placing a skull sticker on her back, and dropping her into a trapping pit. However, the gag backfires as Hiiro instead finds the tarantula cute and feeds the two the gulab jamun, and she accepts and enjoys the espresso. Although Kurumi applies the sticker, Hiiro reveals such graphics are the latest fashion trend and places them on the pair. When Hiiro starts to walk toward the pit, she transforms into her non-chibi, First Mix character design and easily hops over it. In disbelief, Kurumi and Miiko pursue her before falling into the trap themselves.
23	"Sigh Over a Cup of Coffee"; Transliteration: "Kōhī Ippai-bun no Tameiki" (Japanese: 珈琲１杯分のため息)	Motoki Nakanishi	Haruka	July 9, 2021
At Cafe Vinyl, Saori and Haruna complain about their respective units' antics while Aoi expresses discontent with being late for Rondo's meetings due to her fans (which especially peeves Tsubaki). When Saori questions her place in Merm4id, Aoi consoles her by emphasizing her importance to the group before explaining Haruna's value to Lyrical Lily. In return, the two reassure Aoi about the bond between Rondo's members. The three eventually receive texts from their units and leave.
24	"Photo Diary Memories"; Transliteration: "Omoide Foto Daiarī" (Japanese: 想い出フォトダイアリー)	Motoki Nakanishi	Gigaemon Ichikawa	July 16, 2021
Yuka becomes interested in photography and is asked by Marika, who served as a model for Yuka with Towa, what prompted her to take up the hobby. She shares her photos of the other units before Marika and Towa notice a picture of a concert, which Yuka explains highlights her dream of photographing everyone performing together on the same stage.
25	"For Whom the Disc Spins"; Transliteration: "Ta ga Tame ni...." (Japanese: 誰がために。。。)	Motoki Nakanishi	Haruka	July 23, 2021
Like the preliminaries, the six units are subject to an obstacle course to qualify for U4 Fes. The girls are gradually eliminated on various obstacles: Merm4id steps on trap tiles that drop them; Rondo falls off a ledge after Hiiro accidentally lets go of Nagisa's hand; Photon Maiden, Yuka, and Esora incorrectly answer a quiz and are sent into a swamp pit; Shinobu and Muni trip while the walls are closing on them and Rei and Maho are unable to stop them. Rinku and Kyoko escape, but the latter's shirt is caught between the walls and she is eliminated.
26	"Digglers Forever"; Transliteration: "Eien Nare, Itoshiki Digurā-Tachi" (Japanese: 永遠なれ、愛しきディグラーたち)	Motoki Nakanishi	Gigaemon Ichikawa	July 30, 2021
Rinku reaches the end of the obstacle course, where she mourns the loss of her friends before their ghosts appear and motivate her to proceed. When she arrives at the U4 Fes. stage, she discovers the others are still alive and they reveal the objective of the qualifiers was to encourage teamwork, which everyone passed. The units perform before lying down together, hand in hand, in a circle akin to a phonograph record.

===== D4DJ All Mix =====
No.	Title	Directed by	Written by	Original release date
1	"Beginning Beginning"; Transliteration: "Hajimari Hajimari" (Japanese: ハジマリ ハジマリ)	Yūya Yano	Go Zappa	January 13, 2023
2	"Camera, Life, Action!"; Transliteration: "Kamera, Raifu, Akushon!" (Japanese: カメラ ライフ アクション！)	Daichi Ōmori, Kentarō Shiga	Go Zappa	January 20, 2023
3	"Freedom Freedom?"; Transliteration: "Jiyū Jiyū?" (Japanese: ジユウ ジユウ？)	Hajime Yamanokuchi	Go Zappa	January 27, 2023
4	"Spring Storm"; Transliteration: "Haru no Arashi" (Japanese: ハルノアラシ)	Yūya Yano, Hajime Yamanokuchi	Ami Satō	February 3, 2023
5	"Negative/Positive"; Transliteration: "Nega/Poji" (Japanese: ネガ/ポジ)	Kentarō Shiga	Momoka Toyoda	February 10, 2023
6	"Daydream"; Transliteration: "Hakuchūmu" (Japanese: ハクチュウム)	Kentarō Shiga	Ami Satō	February 17, 2023
7	"Everyone is So Cute!"; Transliteration: "Minna Kawaii!" (Japanese: ミンナカワイイ！)	Kentarō Shiga	Momoka Toyoda	February 24, 2023
8	"Love and Sky"; Transliteration: "Ai to Sora" (Japanese: アイトソラ)	Hajime Yamanokuchi	Tatsuya Takahashi	March 3, 2023
9	"Stars and God"; Transliteration: "Hoshi to Kami" (Japanese: ホシトカミ)	Daisuke Suzuki	Tatsuya Takahashi	March 10, 2023
10	"Because It's Cold"; Transliteration: "Samui Yoru Dakara" (Japanese: サムイヨルダカラ)	Yūya Yano	Go Zappa	March 17, 2023
11	"On the Holy Night"; Transliteration: "Seinaru Yoru ni" (Japanese: セイナルヨルニ)	Hajime Yamanokuchi	Go Zappa	March 24, 2023
12	"A Bright Future"; Transliteration: "Zento Yōyō" (Japanese: ゼントヨウヨウ)	Yūya Yano, Kentarō Shiga, Daisuke Suzuki	Go Zappa	March 31, 2023

=== Manga ===
A manga adaptation titled D4DJ: The story of Happy Around! was launched in Bushiroad's Monthly Bushiroad magazine on October 8, 2020.

==== Volume list ====
===== D4DJ: The story of Happy Around! =====
No.	Release date	ISBN
1	April 26, 2021	978-4-04-899480-4
2	August 8, 2022	978-4-04-899531-3

===== D4DJ -The Starting of Photon Maiden- =====
No.	Release date	ISBN
1	April 26, 2021	978-4-06-522695-7
2	July 9, 2021	978-4-06-524037-3
3	October 8, 2021	978-4-06-524845-4

===== D4DJ -The Prologue of Peaky P-key- =====
No.	Release date	ISBN
1	January 8, 2022	978-4-04-899505-4
2	September 8, 2022	978-4-04-899532-0
3	May 8, 2023	978-4-04-899564-1

=== Mobile game ===
D4DJ Groovy Mix is a free-to-play mobile rhythm game developed by Donuts and published by Bushiroad for the Android and iOS platforms. A demo version of the game, titled D4DJ Groovy Mix D4U Edition, was released on February 20, 2020. The full version of the game was released in Japan on October 25, 2020. An English version was released on May 27, 2021.

== Reception ==
Anime News Network reviewer Christopher Farris considered First Mix "as one of [Bushiroad's] best [idol franchises] so far" and that its animation was quite polished, though saying that it did "not [succeed] particularly well" at implementing the technical DJing elements of the show. Anime Feminist author Brock K praised the series' explicit representation of a healthy lesbian relationship between Kokoa and Hayate, as well as Tsubaki's crush on Aoi, while also discussing the nuanced approach of the game's storyline and other characters towards Aoi's exploration of her gender presentation.
