= Yuuki Temma =

Japanese voice actress

- 天麻 ゆうき
- Born: 7 December 1997 (age 28)
- Occupations: Voice actress; singer
- Years active: 2020–present
- Employer: Swallow
- Notable work: Tokyo Mew Mew New as Ichigo Momomiya; D4DJ as Hayate Tendo; Turkey! Time to Strike as Nozomi Mitake
- Musical career
- Member of: Smewthie (2021 -); UniChord (2022 -)

Yuuki Temma (Japanese: 天麻 ゆうき, Hepburn: Tenma Yūki; born 7 December 1997) is a Japanese voice actress and singer from Tokyo, affiliated with Swallow. She starred as Ichigo Momomiya in the 2022 anime Tokyo Mew Mew New and was part of the tie-in singing group Smewthie. Since 2022, she has been part of the musical group UniChord in the D4DJ multimedia franchise, portraying the character Hayate Tendo. She stars as Nozomi Mitake in the 2025 series Turkey! Time to Strike.

== Biography ==
Yuuki Temma, a native of Tokyo, was born on 7 December 1997, and joined a theatrical troupe in the late-2010s. She was selected from over 3,000 applicants in a public audition and made her debut as Ichigo Momomiya in the 2022 anime Tokyo Mew Mew New. Alongside the other four main cast members, she formed the tie-in singing group Smewthie.

In October 2022, Tenma joined the D4DJ franchise, portraying Hayate Tendo, one of the four members of UniChord. In 2024, she played Miki Mizuguchi in Butai: Sasayaku yō ni Koi o Utau, the stage adaptation of Whisper Me a Love Song at Theater1010 in Adachi, Tokyo. She is starring as Nozomi Mitake in the 2025 series Turkey! Time to Strike.

Tenma also had minor roles in Cue! and Kaitō Queen wa Circus ga Osuki. She also worked as the stage narrator for Kana Hanazawa's 2024 concert Hanazawa Kana Live 2024: Intaglio. Tenma also works in rōdoku-geki, performing in theatres in Tokyo.

== Filmography ==
=== Animated television ===
| Year | Title | Role(s) | Ref |
|---|---|---|---|
| 2022 | Tokyo Mew Mew New | Ichigo Momomiya | |
| 2022 | Cue! | Audience | |
| 2025 | City the Animation | Sora Adatara | |
| 2025 | Turkey! Time to Strike | Nozomi Mitake | |
| 2026 | Tetsuryō! Meet with Tetsudō Musume | Misya Kamii | |

=== Animated film ===
| Year | Title | Role(s) | Ref |
|---|---|---|---|
| 2022 | Kaitō Queen wa Circus ga Osuki | | |

=== Stage productions ===
| Year | Title | Role(s) | Ref |
|---|---|---|---|
| 2024 | Butai: Sasayaku yō ni Koi o Utau | Miki Mizuguchi | |

=== Video games ===
| Year | Title | Role(s) | Ref |
|---|---|---|---|
| 2022 | D4DJ Groovy Mix | Hayate Tendo | |
| 2023 | Tower of God: New World | Vespa | |
| 2026 | Nekopara: Sekai Connect | Hana | |
