= Elegg =

- Goddess of Victory: Nikke character
- Artwork of Elegg from Nikke
- First game: Goddess of Victory: Nikke (2024)
- Voiced by: EN: Abby Espiritu; KO: Kim Hyeon-ji; JA: Ayasa Ito

In-universe information
- Race: Nikke
- Affiliation: Electric Shock Squad
- Manufacturer: Missilis Industry

Elegg (/ˈɛlɛɡ/; Korean: 일레그, romanized: Illegeu) is a character from Goddess of Victory: Nikke, a 2022 gacha game developed by South Korean company Shift Up. Implemented in a 2024 update for the title, she is a type of cyborg called a "Nikke", acting as an electrical engineer on board the player's base, the Ark. She is also characterized as a gamer, obsessed with installing the retro game "Boom" on any piece of hardware she can. Outside of Nikke, she has appeared in the tie-in trading card game, as well as the Weiss Schwarz card game. Elegg is voiced by Abby Espiritu in English, Kim Hyeon-ji in Korean, and Ayasa Ito in Japanese.

Elegg was relatively well received upon debut, though opinions differed between regions.

== Background and design ==
In the 2022 video game Goddess of Victory: Nikke, a gacha game developed by Shift Up, the player takes the role of a Commander trying to repel an alien invasion of Earth. To this end, he commands several manufactured cyborgs called "Nikkes", each of which have distinct personalities, appearances and behaviors. In the game's setting, Nikkes are soldiers developed by three major companies with their personalities influenced by their manufacturer's traits, and while their bodies are inorganic, they have organic human brains. The character Elegg was designed by Shift Up's development in response to how development had changed since the game's launch, with director Yoo Hyung-seok stating that the mindset was to create a character with distinct appeal. According to producer Lee Reed, she was one of two characters that became far more popular with players than they expected, the other being D's "Killer Wife" version.

Elegg is a pale skin woman with a curvy body, large breasts, and light bright blonde hair in a mekakure hairstyle. Her hair frames the sides of her head with an ahoge poking from the top, while her purple eyes are typically hidden behind her bangs. She additionally has a snaggletooth on the right side of her mouth that pokes out when she smiles. Her outfit consists of a white crop top and hot pants, with a black undershirt that exposes her stomach. Atop these, she wears a white and yellow jacket with matching sneakers, black and yellow gloves that go up the wrists, and a similar bag with a bunny logo strapped to her hip. Meanwhile, a large canister with a green glowing energy is suspended off her lower back. Orange suspenders extend from her hot pants under her crop top, while additional orange straps reading "Electric Shock" rest on each shoulder of her jacket.

A summer version of Elegg, called "Elegg: Boom and Shock", was added in a later update for the game.

== Appearances ==
In Goddess of Victory: Nikke's setting, Elegg is manufactured by the company Missilis Industry, and is affiliated with the Electric Shock Squad. She is further personified as a gamer who is skilled at adjusting energy efficiency, and assists with maintaining the infrastructure at the player's Ark base. She has an obsession with the in-universe retro game "Boom", and tries to install it on every system she can. Elegg is also close friends with her squadmade Trony, and tries to encourage her to be less of a shut in. She was introduced in the game's "Boom's Day" event, which revolved around a game show occurring in the Ark. She is voiced by Abby Espiritu in English, Kim Hyeon-ji in Korean, and Ayasa Ito in Japanese.

Elegg was later featured in the game's "Boom! The Ghost!" event, in which the cast investigated an abandoned ship. Serving as the introduction of her swimsuit version, she develops a gun called the "BFG" to help capture the ghosts lurking on the ship. Later, she was also featured as part of the "Memories Teller" event, which introduced guest characters Eve and others from Shift Up's other title, Stellar Blade. Outside of Nikke, she has also been featured in the tie-in trading card game, as well as the board game Nikke: Duel Encounter. Outside of the Nikke series, she also appears on cards for the Weiss Schwarz trading card game.

== Promotion and reception ==
Elegg's swimsuit design received significant reception, and was seen as heavily boosting her popularity. Several aspects of the character and her design referencing the Doom franchise via her obsession with the "Boom" video game were also praised.

Elegg was one of several characters featured in Shift Up's presentation for the game at the 2025 Tokyo Game Show. To promote the addition of her swimsuit version to the game, Shift Up released a pair of ASMR videos of the character in English, Korean, and Japanese, with her voice actors for each region providing the audio. Meanwhile, cosplayers portrayed Elegg as part of Shift Up's "Doro Family Summer Tour" which promoted the game in five cities worldwide, and the 2025 Summer Comiket. Several figures have also been produced of her by companies such as Hobby Sakura, Ribose, and Bandai Spirits. Other promotional items have included key chains, cushions, desk mats, mobile phone batteries, and food.

Elegg has been cited as an example of a character that can be seen as example of a plus-sized character in Nikke, with eSports.gg writer Lawrence Phillips describing her as "relatively unpopular". Gil Yong-chan of Gameple stated that the character had received mixed reception from Korean audiences. While he described her as having a "lively and playful vibe" due to her voice acting and animations, she bore a close resemblance to the game's existing "mob" characters, a mass-produced type of Nikke found in-game. Players noticed this aspect too, and while some felt she was unique and cute, others felt the similarity reduced her overall charm. However, he noticed a very different response from Western audiences, describing the response as explosive in how she eclipsed the popularity of previous characters and the amount of fan generated content she received. He attributed some of this response to her character design, which he felt was a "nerdy concept emphasizing health and vitality", and further felt the game's diversity in body shapes helped Nikke popularity overall.

Outlets in other regions offered their own opinions. Taiwanese magazine Cool Style praised her design, stating that just looking at images of the characters piques one's interest and that the developers understood their audience. Further praise went towards her "airhead" appearance and how her hair covered her eyes, as well as the shape of her midsection and "honey-shaped thighs", which they felt caused significant discussion around the character. Zhuó Jī of Taiwanese newspaper United Daily News highlighted some of the notable quirks of her character, such as how she stepped on the heels of shoes when firing. Japanese website Hobby Watch meanwhile praised how her bangs coupled with her ahoge created a unique appearance, and felt her expressions coupled with her snaggletooth gave her a devilish aspect. However, at the same time they expressed that while her swimsuit had a unique style, it could barely be called swimwear due to its level of exposure.

Yuzuru Fushimachi of Japanese website Inside praised her personality, stating that while she was shown to get frequently excited, she retained her pride as an engineer. Additionally, while Elegg has an otaku temperament, instead of being overbearing he saw her as highly communicative, with her interests acting as a social lubricant with others. This was demonstrated also with her friendship and regard for Trony, which he found a highlight of the story. He further stated that while characters in Nikke tended to be beautiful or cute in varying degrees, Elegg was instead visually "quirky". This was illustrated by her face, which outside of one eye sometimes peeking out of her bangs left much of it up to the player's imagination. Her figure also analyzed for its appeal, specifically her bust size but also how the shape of her stomach and legs augmented by the tightness of her clothes portrayed "a perfect flow of contours, creating a unique curve that can't be captured by just having a good figure". Fushimachi felt it suggested a mix of both body fat and muscle in her physique, and stated Elegg's indirect approach to cuteness represented Nikke's "unique and distinctive visual and style, making it a niche yet irreplaceable charm".

In regards to her swimsuit, Fushimachi described it as captivating due to its bold design, particularly in how the chest piece doubled as a monitor and provided "a daunting presence in many ways". They further praised how it emphasized her figure, while also stating that the character never seemed to overtly try to be sexy, giving her an irresistible charm. In another article, they observed that fan reaction to this design was particularly strong, drawing in more than double the social media interactions of other characters. He attributed it significantly to her character's charm, but also in how her animations helped emphasize her bright personality. While he pointed out that Nikke had effectively overshadowed her plus-size niche with the more voluptuous character Bready, the swimsuit's implementation helped her stand apart while also introducing her to new players who took a similar liking to her.

Cool Style also enjoyed how the "Boom" references in her character were a nod id Software's Doom series, down to her gun bearing similarities to the 2005 film adaptation's rendition of the BFG 9000, and how her obsession with installing Boom on everything possible mimicked real-life player's efforts do to the same with the original Doom title. United Daily News in their own coverage of the character pointed to these references as well, but also illustrated how her hairstyle heavily obscured her face in a manner similar to faceless protagonists in entertainment media, a trope they felt commonly reserved for male characters, and gave her a resemblance to the character Yanagi Uzaki from the anime Uzaki-chan Wants to Hang Out!. Another point of interest they found was that her Japanese voice actress also voiced the character Elfuda in the anime Plus-Sized Elf, a similarly chubby character.
