= Turkey! Time to Strike =

Japanese anime television series

- Key visual
- Genre: Sports (Bowling); Time travel
- Created by: Bakken Record; Pony Canyon
- Anime television series
- Directed by: Susumu Kudo
- Written by: Naomi Hiruta
- Music by: Yuki Hayashi
- Studio: Bakken Record
- Licensed by: Crunchyroll
- Original network: Nippon TV, BS NTV, TSB
- Original run: July 9, 2025 – September 24, 2025
- Episodes: 12
- icon

Turkey! Time to Strike, also simply known in Japan as Turkey!, is an original Japanese anime television series about tenpin bowling and time traveling created by Bakken Record and Pony Canyon, set in the city of Chikuma, Nagano. It aired from July to September 2025.

== Plot ==
The bowling club of Ikkokukan High School in Nagano Prefecture consists of five members: club leader Mai Otonashi, first-year student Rina Godai, nervous Sayuri Ichinose, fashionable Nozomi Mitaka, and nerdy Nanase Nikaidō. During a match between Mai and Rina to persuade Rina against leaving, a bolt of lightning strikes a partially buried artifact at a nearby construction site, which affects Mai's bowling ball as she is about to bowl, dragging her away down the lane. As the rest of the club members attempt to pull Mai to safety, the ball sends the club back in time to the Sengoku period (1467–1615), where they are taken in by the young samurai Suguri Tokura, who they save from a group of bandits. After witnessing Suguri's sister, Sumomo, playing a game similar to bowling, the club attempts to return to the present by recreating the same conditions that sent them back in time.

== Characters ==
=== Ikkokukan High School bowling club ===
Mai Otonashi (音無 麻衣, Otonashi Mai)
Voiced by: Hana Hishikawa
The president of the Ikkokukan High School bowling club. Mai has been a highly skilled bowler since she was a child. However, for reasons unknown, every time she scores a turkey, she immediately leaves snake eyes, always resulting in the club being eliminated in bowling tournaments.
Rina Godai (五代 利奈, Godai Rina)
Voiced by: Kana Ichinose
The club's most skilled bowler who rivals Mai. Rina takes bowling very seriously and is often frustrated with the club's lack of motivation to win tournaments, causing her to want to quit the club. She often clashes with other club members.
Sayuri Ichinose (一ノ瀬 さゆり, Ichinose Sayuri)
Voiced by: Haruki Iwata
A club member and one of Mai's childhood friends. Sayuri is a shy girl who always throws gutterballs. She later becomes friends with Suguri and learns that Suguri is a woman.
Nozomi Mitaka (三鷹 希, Mitaka Nozomi)
Voiced by: Yuuki Temma
A club member and one of Mai's childhood friends. Nozomi is more focused on her looks and gaining popularity than bowling.
Nanase Nikaidō (二階堂 七瀬, Nikaidō Nanase)
Voiced by: Ayasa Itō
A club member with no other ties to Mai. Nanase joined the club under the belief that associating with an athletic club will afford her better academic opportunities in the future. Once they travel to the past, she warns them to not make any changes so the future is not altered.

=== Tokura family ===
Sumomo (寿桃)
Voiced by: Noriko Hidaka
A member of the Tokura family, she plays a game similar to bowling. She correctly deduces that the club have traveled from the future. Mai later teaches her how to bowl. It is later revealed she is arranged to be married to the Washio clan's leader to ensure that the village remains under the protection of Washio.
Akebi (朱火)
Voiced by: Yūko Minaguchi
A mysterious girl who always wears a mask when outside. She is later revealed to be Sumomo's twin sister, who went into hiding to protect Sumomo due to fortune tellers believing that twins bring about misfortune.
Suguri (傑里)
Voiced by: Kikuko Inoue
Sumomo's older sister, who plays the role of a man in order to protect her family.
Anzu (庵珠)
Voiced by: Miki Itō
The youngest Tokura sister who is angry at by the presence of the bowling club members, who have posed as traveling performers. She is later saved by Nozomi after she goes to retrieve goumi berries as a gift.
Natsume (夏夢)
Voiced by: Rei Sakuma
The eldest Tokura sister, who left the family to pursue her dreams after an encounter with another man who came from the future.

=== Other characters ===
Haru (はる)
Voiced by: Noriko Hidaka
Mai's foster parent who took her in after her parents died.
Tamajyu (玉重)
Voiced by: Nobuo Tobita^{Ep. 9 credits}
A fortune teller and Kagetoki's retainer.
Sakaki Kagetoki (坂城 景時)
Voiced by: Takanori Hoshino^{Ep. 10 credits}
A feudal lord of a nation neighboring the Tokuras, who is constantly putting pressure on them.

== Production and release ==
Turkey! Time to Strike was animated by Bakken Record, directed by Susumu Kudo and written by Naomi Hiruta, with Airi Takekawa serving as character designer, Yuki Hayashi composing the music, and Pony Canyon producing the music. The series aired from July 9 to September 24, 2025, on Nippon TV's AnichU programming block and other channels, (Note: Nippon TV listed the series premiere at 25:29 on July 8, 2025, which is effectively July 9 at 1:29 a.m. JST.) and is released internationally on Crunchyroll. The opening theme song is "Hyakunichisou" (ヒャクニチソウ; lit. 'Common Zinnia'), performed by Nagano Prefectural Ikkokukan High School Bowling Club (Hana Hishikawa, Kana Ichinose, Haruki Iwata, Yuuki Temma and Ayasa Itō), with episode 9's version performed by Daughters of the Tokura Family (Noriko Hidaka, Yūko Minaguchi, Kikuko Inoue, Miki Itō and Rei Sakuma), while the ending theme song is "Moshimo" (もしも; lit. 'What If'), performed by Taiyō to Odore, Tsukiyo ni Utae. The ending was replaced in several episodes by insert songs: in episode 4, "Flashback" by Q.I.S.; in episode 6, "Sincerity Flower" by Aira Yūki; in episode 7, "Strike Freedom!" by Azami; and in episode 9, "Natsu no Sumika" by Nagi Yanagi.

=== Episodes ===
No.	Title	Directed by	Storyboarded by	Original release date
1	"Knock Down the Snake Eyes!"; Transliteration: "Taose! Sunēku Ai" (Japanese: 倒せ！スネークアイ)	Susumu Kudō, Daisuke Naitō, Kyōsuke Katō	Susumu Kudō	July 9, 2025
After Mai Otonashi's bowling club suffers another bowling tournament loss, the top performing member Rina Godai criticizes Mai and the rest of the club for not taking the sport seriously. Dissatisfied that Mai seems to have no intention of changing the club, Rina decides to quit, putting the club below the five minimum required members. Mai tries to convince Rina to give the club a second chance, and Rina only agrees on the condition that Mai can beat her in a bowling match. Mai and Rina face off, and they are both equally matched until Mai once again chokes on her third set and hits snake eyes like she does in all of her tournaments, which angers Rina again as she believes Mai is mocking her by throwing the match. Mai attempts to recover when lightning suddenly strikes an unearthed orb at an excavation site, causing Mai's bowling ball to glow and pull her into a rift. Rina and the rest of the club try to rescue her but they are all pulled in. Mai then wakes up later only to find herself in the middle of a battlefield between two warring samurai armies.
2	"Lost, Outside the Spot"; Transliteration: "Mayotte, Auto Supatto" (Japanese: 迷って、アウトスパット)	Daisuke Naitō	Tomoyuki Munehiro, Daisuke Naitō	July 16, 2025
Mai and the club wake up on a battlefield between two samurai armies. Still confused about the situation, they manages to reunite with Rina before they are attacked by a group of bandits. A young samurai intervenes and holds off the bandits long enough for the girls to escape into the forest. Regrouping there, the girls try to make sense of the situation. Nanase deduces that the battlefield is the site of their local bowling alley before it was built, and that they somehow must have been sent back in time to the Sengoku period. They then catch sight of the young samurai that helped them being captured by the bandits. Working together, the girls manage to distract the bandits while Mai knocks them out with her bowling ball, rescuing the samurai. The samurai, Suguri, thanks the girls, while the girls make up a cover story that they are traveling performers. As thanks, Suguri takes them to the estate to stay the night where they encounter a young girl that resembles Mai playing a game similar to bowling.
3	"Lean on Your Balance Line"; Transliteration: "Tayotte, Baransu Rain" (Japanese: 頼って、バランスライン)	Tatsurō Kawakami	Hiroaki Shimura, Tatsurō Kawakami	July 23, 2025
Suguri introduces the girl as Sumomo, an eccentric older sister, who quickly befriends Mai. However, their younger sister Anzu is hostile to the club due to her having a traumatizing experience with traveling performers in the past. That night, Nanase theorizes that in order for the club to return home, they need to recreate the conditions that sent them though time in the first place. Namely, they need to have Mai and Rina compete in a bowling match where they both score turkeys right when lightning strikes. Rina is skeptical of the plan since bowling alleys do not exist in the Sengoku era, but Mai is confident they will find a way and suggests they enjoy their time in this era while they wait for the next thunderstorm. During dinner, they learn that after Suguri's father, the previous lord, died, Suguri inherited the village. They also learn that Sumomo has a way to prevent rival clans from attacking. Mai finds Sumomo playing her bowling-like game, but struggles to explain bowling without talking about future events. However, Sumomo reveals that she has already deduced Mai and her friends are from the future.
4	"The Chaotic Big Four"; Transliteration: "Konran no Biggu fō" (Japanese: 混乱のビッグフォー)	Kyōsuke Katō	Kyōsuke Katō	July 30, 2025
The girls wake up to find Mai leading the villagers in building a primitive bowling alley. When they confront her about this, she reveals that Sumomo knows they are from the future, as one year prior, another "traveling performer" stopped by the village, and when he left, Sumomo's older sister, Natsume, left with him, which is what traumatized Anzu. Mai also mentions she promised to teach Sumomo about bowling in order to keep their secret. While Mai teaches Sumomo how to bowl, Rina encounters a mysterious masked girl, while Nozomi gets angry at Anzu for harassing her. As night falls, the girls realize Rina is missing and go searching for her. They soon find a makeshift bowling alley in the forest that Rina had secretly built. A thunderstorm then begins to form, and Mai and Rina meet at the village bowling to recreate their bowling match. Mai's bowling ball eventually glows and opens the rift, but Rina is unable to reach it due to a fire. Rina accepts this due to her abandonment issues. Mai and the others decide to stay with her, promising they all will be going home together.
5	"A Passing Hook Ball"; Transliteration: "Surechigatte, Fukku Bōru" (Japanese: すれ違って、フックボール)	Tatsurō Kawakami	Tatsurō Kawakami	August 6, 2025
The villagers rebuild the burnt down bowling alley while Nozomi grows anxious that her phone battery is running out. The girls then find out that they may be stuck in the Sengoku period for a year due to how different the temperatures are compared to their era. Nanase theorizes if they jump off a high enough elevation, they can trigger the rift. However, this fails after Nozomi throws her bowling ball off a cliff. Disheartened, Nozomi returns to the estate and ends up befriending Anzu. Anzu picks up an interest in Nozomi's phone, but accidentally drains most of its battery, which angers Nozomi. Determined to make up with Nozomi, Anzu heads out to find goumi berries. Suguri and the girls search for Anzu after they realize she is missing, and Nozomi finds her trying to pick the berries from a cliff. Nozomi manages to save Anzu but they fall to the bottom of the ravine, where they are surrounded by wild dogs. Finding her bowling ball, Nozomi uses it to distract the dogs and leads Anzu to safety. The next day, Rina and Nozomi make amends with each other, with Rina admitting she appreciates what they did.
6	"Reverse Hook, Clear Across"; Transliteration: "Tobikoete, Ribāsu Fukku" (Japanese: 飛び越えて、リバースフック)	Daisuke Naitō	Daisuke Naitō	August 13, 2025
The girls witness a messenger from the Washio clan arrive at the village to inquire about the rift, whose light had been witnessed, with Suguri claiming no knowledge of it. The messenger then also asks if Sumomo has begun to menstruate, which Suguri denies. The girls then learn that Sumomo is to wed to the head of the Washio clan. Mai protests this, but backs down when Sumomo assures her that she wants to go through with it in order to protect the village. That night, Sayuri panics when she begins to menstruate, but Suguri helps her through it. Sayuri shockingly learn that Suguri is actually a girl. The next day, Suguri leads the villagers to ambush a group of bandits, killing almost all of them. Sayuri is distraught at Suguri having killed other people without provocation. However, Suguri maintains that she would be willing to kill to protect those dear to her, including Sayuri. The surviving bandit then ambushes Suguri, forcing Sayuri to mortally wound him by throwing a rock at his head. Suguri finishes off the bandit, with Sayuri coming to terms with the fact killing is necessary in the Sengoku period. Suguri then reassures Sayuri.
7	"Hold On to the Loft Ball"; Transliteration: "Dakishimetai, Rofuto Bōru" (Japanese: 抱きしめたい、ロフトボール)	Susumu Kudō	Daisuke Naitō	August 20, 2025
Sayuri tells the rest of the club about Suguri's true identity. Nanase angrily reminds everybody that they are supposed to avoid changing the past. Just then, Natsume returns from her travels, confirming that the traveling performer she was with also came from the future. Suguri soon arrives and mentions that Natsume was the one to marry who was supposed to marry into the Washio clan, which she refused. This revelation causes an angry Nanase to leave. Natsume meets Nanase privately, where the latter confides she got angry because she felt her father abandoned her. Natsume comments that he left to pursue his passion and that partings are inevitable, and Nanase admits she does not actually hate him for it. Natsume also reveals the traveling performer managed to return to his own time. Natsume then asks Nanase to help her find a way to protect their village. Both Nanase and Mai come up with the idea to build a hot spring as a tourist attraction. Nanase develops a primitive boring machine she learned from her father, and comments how the "Sweetie" nickname Natsume learned from the traveling performer is the same one her father used to call her.
8	"A Surprise Blind Score"; Transliteration: "Odoroki no Buraindo Sukoa" (Japanese: 驚きのブラインドスコア)	Kyōsuke Katō	Kyōsuke Katō	August 27, 2025
Thanks to Nanase's boring machine, the village is able to construct a hot spring, and the club wonders why exactly Sumomo has not started menstruating yet. That night, Sayuri asks Suguri about the fifth sister she mentioned, but Suguri insists she misspoke. The next day, Mai and Sayuri tell Rina and Sumomo, respectively, about how Mai's parents were killed in a car accident shortly after Mai won her first bowling tournament. Despite the tragedy, Mai insists that her adoptive mother Haru helped her overcome her trauma and become the person who she is today. Upon hearing the story, Rina immediately regrets accusing Mai of throwing her games. Meanwhile, Natsume reveals that the traveling performer was bowling at the time of the lightning storm before he was sent home. This causes Nanase to wonder if the traveling performer was her father. That night, the girls are suddenly awoken by the sound of bowling. They begin searching the estate to investigate the noise, and accidentally find a hidden passage to an underground room where they meet a girl who resembles Sumomo. The other sisters then arrive, and Suguri draws her sword in order to protect her family's secret.
9	"Right in the Pocket Together"; Transliteration: "Minna de Jasutopoketto" (Japanese: みんなでジャストポケット)	Tatsurō Kawakami	Tatsurō Kawakami	September 3, 2025
Instead of attacking the club, Suguri attempts to commit seppuku, but she is stopped by her sisters. The fifth sister, Akebi, tells everybody to leave her alone and retreats into her room. The sisters explain to the club how a fortune teller told Lord Washio that Sumomo and Akebi were twins, and the secondborn one was destined to bring misfortune. Akebi volunteered herself when Lord Washio pressured them to reveal the identity of said twin. As a result, the sisters were forced to fake Akebi's death and hide her away in the basement. The club decides to use the hot spring to clear their heads and catch Akebi attempting to leap off a cliff. Both the club and the sisters confront Akebi. Mai soon comes up with the idea of deciding which sister will die through a bowling match. Everybody at first is confused by Mai's suggestion. Eventually, everybody joins in on the match and have so much fun they completely forget about their earlier challenge. Akebi, realizing her sisters are protecting her for her sake, reconciles with them just as a thunderstorm begins to form.
10	"What Do We Do? Split"; Transliteration: "Dō Suru? Supuritto" (Japanese: どうする？スプリット)	Kyōsuke Katō	Kyōsuke Katō	September 10, 2025
With the thunderstorm having started, the club says their goodbyes to the Tokura sisters and successfully return to the present right before the point they originally traveled to the past. Happy they are back in their own time, the club heads to the local museum to find out what happened to the sisters. To their shock, they learn that shortly after they left, the neighboring lord, Kagetoki Sakaki, invaded their village and killed them all. Both Rina and Nanase reason that this was how history originally happened. Mai insists on traveling back to the past to save the sisters, confiding in her friends she has feelings of survivor's guilt and believes she should have died instead of her parents. While her friends agree to go back to the past, they believe that they should take the time to prepare themselves. As they wait for the next thunderstorm, the club rigorously trains and procures a number of items. When the next thunderstorm arrives, the club heads back to the past where Kagetoki and his men are preparing to execute the sisters. Using smoke bombs and fireworks, the club successfully halts the execution.
11	"A Desperate Punch Out"; Transliteration: "Kenmei no Panchiauto" (Japanese: 懸命のパンチアウト)	Daisuke Naitō, Susumu Kudō	Daisuke Naitō, Taishi Kawakami	September 17, 2025
A flashback shows the club brainstorming on what they needed to do to not just save the Tokura sisters, but also prevent any future invasions of their territory. Ruling out killing Kagetoki and his men, they instead came up with a plan to goad Kagetoki into accepting a bowling match. Back in the present, after derailing the execution, the club begins insulting Kagetoki, accusing him of being a coward. Seeing that the girls' insults have shamed his clan, Kagetoki agrees to a nonfatal contest, with the club convincing him to try bowling, with the terms being he will leave the Tokura sisters alone if he loses, but will execute both the club and the sisters if he wins. However, rather than playing himself, Kagetoki challenges the club members to each score a strike in order for him to admit defeat. Sayuri, Nozomi, and Nanase are able to score strikes using the lessons they learned from their time in the past. However, before Rina and Mai can take their turn, Kagetoki suddenly modifies the rules, taking everybody else hostage and tying them up behind the bowling alley to remind the two girls of the stakes of their game.
12	"A Farewell Turkey!"; Transliteration: "Sayonara no Tākī!" (Japanese: さよならのTurkey!)	Susumu Kudō, Tatsurō Kawakami	Susumu Kudō, Kyōsuke Katō, Tatsurō Kawakami	September 24, 2025
Everybody realizes that Kagetoki's fortune teller is true mastermind responsible for the situation. Rina decides to go next, but due to her wounded arm, she botches her throw, resulting in a 7–10 split that put both Sayuri and Suguri up for execution. Mai successfully convinces Kagetoki to allow her to make a second throw. As it begins to rain, Sumomo reassures Mai when she realizes the latter is subconsciously afraid of winning in fear of losing people close to her. As such, Mai miraculously knocks down both pins. Kagetoki honors his word and leaves the village. After a while, a rift suddenly opens. The club enters it, but Mai accidentally drops her ball, which Sumomo recovers. Back in the present, the girls return to their regular lives. After the club manages to win a bowling tournament, Mai tries to return the past but the rift never reopens. At the end of school year, Mai heads out to her graduation ceremony when she finds a note left by Haru, which reveals she is actually Sumomo. It also reveals how she arrived in Mai's time period. A touched Mai meets up with her friends to tell them the story.

== Reception ==
There is debate as to whether the series falls into the isekai genre. While it has been described as an isekai on some websites such as Anime News Network and Anime Feminist, others such as Anime UK News argue that Turkey! just falls under the time travel genre instead.
