= Ayasa Itō =

Japanese voice actress

- 伊藤 彩沙
- Born: August 17, 1996 (age 30); Kyoto Prefecture, Japan
- Occupation: Voice actress
- Years active: 2013–present
- Agent: Hibiki
- Height: 153 cm (5 ft 0 in)

Ayasa Itō (伊藤 彩沙, Itō Ayasa; born August 17, 1996) is a Japanese voice actress from Kyoto Prefecture. She is a member of the singing unit Milky Holmes Feathers, formed with fellow voice actress Aimi for the media franchise Tantei Opera Milky Holmes.

She is known for playing Poppin'Party keyboardist Arisa Ichigaya in the band-based anime series BanG Dream!. She also played Kaoruko Hanayagi in the media franchise Revue Starlight, and Vivlos in the multimedia franchise Umamusume: Pretty Derby.

== Career ==
Itō was a junior high school student when she tried out some dub recording at NHK Studio Park. She decided to become a voice actresses when she received praise for her dubs. She quit doing high school activities in 2013 to study acting, and applied on April 27 for the "Milky Holmes Sisters Members Scout Audition". The audition had a field of 2,000 applicants, Itō was chosen from these people to play the role of Alice Myojingawa as well as be part of a sextet called the "Milky Holmes Sisters". Itō grew up in Kyoto but commuted to Tokyo where she worked, she finally moved there in early 2015 after her high school graduation then attended college.

On April 10, 2020, Itō, Aimi, and Mikoi Sasaki started their own YouTube channel under the name of the Three Voice Acting Sisters [Team Y]. In a video posted in October 2020, Itō and the two others stated that they wished for their YouTube channel to be detailed in their Wikipedia pages.

== Filmography ==
=== Anime ===
List of voice performances in anime
Year	Title	Role	Notes	Source
2013–16	Tantei Opera Milky Holmes series	Alice Myojingawa	starting from Futari wa Milky Holmes	
2013	Outbreak Company			
2014–18	Cardfight!! Vanguard G series	Saya Yatomi		
2017–present	BanG Dream!	Arisa Ichigaya		
2018	Slow Start	Tamate Momochi		
2018–21	Revue Starlight	Kaoruko Hanayagi		
2019	A Certain Magical Index III	Tochtli	eps. 16–17	
2020–21	Yatogame-chan Kansatsu Nikki series	Nao Koshiyasu		
2020–22	Mewkledreamy	Maira Tsukishima		
2020	Is the Order a Rabbit? BLOOM	Miki		
2021	Joran: The Princess of Snow and Blood	Asahi Nakamura		
2021	I've Been Killing Slimes for 300 Years and Maxed Out My Level	Fighsly		
2021	D_Cide Traumerei the Animation	Rena Mouri		
2021	Taisho Otome Fairy Tale	Kotori Shiratori		
2022	The Demon Girl Next Door Season 2	Lico		
2022	In the Heart of Kunoichi Tsubaki	Mukuge		
2022	Teppen!!!!!!!!!!!!!!! Laughing 'til You Cry	Yayoi Sakamoto		
2022	Reiwa no Di Gi Charat	Bushirodo-no-Mikoto		
2023	Ippon Again!	Michi Sonoda		
2023	Too Cute Crisis	Garumi Lou		
2023	Umamusume: Pretty Derby Season 3	Vivlos		
2024	Ōmuro-ke	Mirai Sōma	2 films	
2024	An Archdemon's Dilemma: How to Love Your Elf Bride	Manuela		
2024	Delico's Nursery	Angelico Fra		
2024	Plus-Sized Elf	Elfuda		
2024	Tying the Knot with an Amagami Sister	Mitsuko Umenoki		
2025	Medalist	Suzu Kamoto		
2025	Necronomico and the Cosmic Horror Show	Gua		
2025	Turkey! Time to Strike	Nanase Nikaidō		
2025	A Gatherer's Adventure in Isekai	Bee		
2025	Li'l Miss Vampire Can't Suck Right	Yukari Henmi		
2026	The Daughter of the Demon Lord Is Too Kind!	Sati		
2026	Kirio Fan Club	Satsuki Muraoka		
2026	Marika's Love Meter Malfunction	Sayuki Toyotomi		
2026	Hanaori-san Still Wants to Fight in the Next Life	Moe Narukami		
2026	Magical Girl Lyrical Nanoha Exceeds Gun Blaze Vengeance	Aoi Niina		
2026	FX Fighter Kurumi-chan	Mebuki Yamashi		
2027	Multi-Mind Mayhem	Selina		
2027	Otherworldly Munchkin: Let's Speedrun the Dungeon with Only 1 HP!	Managarmr		
2027	7-nin no Nemuri Hime	Mia		
2027	No-Clipping My Way to Supremacy!	Maris		

=== Video games ===
List of voice performances in video games
Year	Title	Role	Notes	Source
2017	BanG Dream! Girls Band Party!	Arisa Ichigaya		
	Valiant Knights	Juli Rosenheim		
2018	Shōjo Kageki Revue Starlight -Re LIVE-	Kaoruko Hanayagi		
2019	Da Capo 4	Nino Tokisaka		
2021	Arknights	Beanstalk		
2021	Azur Lane	IJN Kazagumo		
2021	Fate Grand Order	Habetrot		
2021	Monark	Yoru		
2021	Alchemy Stars	Tweety		
2022	Girls' Frontline	MAG-7		
2023	Xicatrice	Shiduru Nagamiya		
2023	Umamusume: Pretty Derby	Vivlos		
2024	NIKKE	Elegg		
2025	Honkai: Star Rail	Cipher		
2026	Nekopara: Sekai Connect	Paramita		

=== Audio drama ===
List of voice performances in audio dramas
Year	Title	Role	Notes	Source
2013	Radio Futari wa Milky Holmes	Alice Myojingawa	Broadcast on HiBiKi Radio Station	
2014	Aimi Ayasa no Milky Holmes Feathers Time	Alice Myojingawa	Broadcast on HiBiKi Radio Station	
2015	BanG Dream!	Arisa Ichigaya	Hibiki radio	

=== Dubbing ===
- Freakier Friday (Lily Reyes (Sophia Hammons))
