= Moeka Koizumi =

Japanese actress

- 小泉萌香
- Born: 27 February 1996 (age 30); Amagasaki Hyogo Prefecture, Japan
- Other names: Moepi; Pipi
- Occupations: Actor; voice actress; singer
- Years active: 2010–present
- Agent: Amuse
- Notable work: Love Live! Nijigasaki High School Idol Club as Shioriko Mifune; Revue Starlight as Nana Daiba; D4DJ as Yuka Jennifer Sasago; Odd Taxi as Shiho Ichimura

Moeka Koizumi (小泉 萌香, Koizumi Moeka; born 27 February 1996) is a Japanese actress, voice actress, singer, and model affiliated with Amuse. She is best known for voicing Nana Daiba in Revue Starlight, Shioriko Mifune in Love Live! Nijigasaki High School Idol Club, and Yuka Jennifer Sasago in D4DJ.

== Biography ==
Koizumi was born into a musical family, with both of her parents and grandfather having music-related jobs. She also has an older sister who works as a model in Osaka, whose stage name is Licca.

She is described as shy and modest, but sometimes a playful person who is rather independent. She says that she relates to her Revue Starlight character Nana in that she is always preoccupied with her cast-mates' well-being.

Along with costar Haruki Iwata, Koizumi is part of the musical unit "harmoe".

== Filmography ==
=== Anime ===
- Revue Starlight (2018) as Nana Daiba
- D4DJ First Mix and All Mix (2020) as Yuka Jennifer Sasago
- Love Live! Nijigasaki High School Idol Club (2020) as Shioriko Mifune
- Odd Taxi (2021) as Shiho Ichimura
- I Shall Survive Using Potions! (2023) as Emile
- Fluffy Paradise (2024) as Belgar Crius
- Harmony of Mille-Feuille (2025) as Mizuki Fujishiro
- Possibly the Greatest Alchemist of All Time (2025) as Máni
- Kunon the Sorcerer Can See (2026) as Jilni

=== Video games ===
- Revue Starlight Re:Live (2018) as Nana Daiba
- Love Live! School Idol Festival All Stars (2019) as Shioriko Mifune
- D4DJ Groovy Mix (2020) as Yuka Jennifer Sasago
- Towa Tsugai (2023) as Fukurou
- Love Live! Nijigasaki High School Idol Club Tokimeki Roadmap to Future (2025) as Shioriko Mifune

=== Live-action film ===
- Erica (2026) as Mutsumi Sagawa
