= Haruki Iwata =

Japanese actress

- 岩田 陽葵
- Born: 3 April 1995 (age 31); Tokyo, Japan
- Occupations: Actress; singer
- Years active: 2011–present
- Notable work: Assault Lily as Mai Thi Yoshimura; Revue Starlight as Mahiru Tsuyuzaki; D4DJ as Towa Hanamaki

Haruki Iwata (Japanese: 岩田 陽葵, Hepburn: Iwata Haruki; born 3 April 1995) is a Japanese actress and singer affiliated with Fennec. She is known for portraying Mahiru Tsuyuzaki in Revue Starlight, Mai Thi Yoshimura in Assault Lily, and Towa Hanamaki in D4DJ.

== Biography ==
Haruki Iwata, a native of Tokyo, was born on 3 April 1995. She started attending a vocational school as a junior high school student and was educated at Keio University. In 2011, she appeared in the third episode of the drama Jūichinin mo Iru!.

In July 2019, she became part of the D4DJ franchise as Towa Hanamaki, one of four members of Photon Maiden. She voiced the character in D4DJ First Mix (2020-2021), D4DJ Petit Mix (2021), and D4DJ All Mix (2023). She also portrays Mahiru Tsuyuzaki in Bushiroad's Revue Starlight franchise. In addition to voicing the character in the 2018 anime, she also reprised the role in the video game Revue Starlight: Re LIVE and stage plays.

Iwata portrays Mai Thi Yoshimura, a character in Bushiroad's Assault Lily franchise. She portrayed the character in three of the franchise's stage plays: League of Gardens (2020), The Fateful Gift (2020), and Lost Memories (2022). She also reprised the role in the 2020 anime adaptation Assault Lily Bouquet and the 2021 game Assault Lily Last Bullet.

In September 2019, Iwata was cast as Yuki Sakuragi in Rebirth. In December 2020, it was announced that she and Moeka Koizumi would be forming a voice actor unit called Harmoe. She was a guest at Anime Festival Asia in 2022. In February 2023, she was cast as Belle in I Shall Survive Using Potions!. In March 2023, she was cast as Sayuri Ichinose in Turkey! Time to Strike. In July 2023, she was cast as Kobeni Higashiyama in Chainsaw Man The Stage.

Iwata is the niece of voice actor Mitsuo Iwata.

== Filmography ==
=== Live-action television ===
2011

- Jūichinin mo Iru!

=== Anime television ===
2018

- Revue Starlight, Mahiru Tsuyuzaki

2020

- Assault Lily Bouquet, Mai Thi Yoshimura
- D4DJ First Mix, Towa Hanamaki
- Rebirth, Yuki Sakuragi

2021

- D4DJ Petit Mix, Towa Hanamaki

2023

- D4DJ All Mix, Towa Hanamaki
- I Shall Survive Using Potions!, Belle

2025

- Turkey! Time to Strike, Sayuri Ichinose

2026

- Tetsuryō! Meet with Tetsudō Musume, Minano Sakurazawa

=== Video games ===
2018

- Revue Starlight: Re LIVE, Mahiru Tsuyuzaki

2020

- D4DJ Groovy Mix, Towa Hanamaki

=== Stage plays ===
2017

- Revue Starlight: The LIVE #1, Mahiru Tsuyuzaki

2018

- Revue Starlight: The LIVE #1: Revival, Mahiru Tsuyuzaki
- Revue Starlight: The LIVE #2: Transition, Mahiru Tsuyuzaki

2019

- Revue Starlight: The LIVE #2: Revival, Mahiru Tsuyuzaki

2020

- Assault Lily: League of Gardens, Mai Thi Yoshimura
- Assault Lily: The Fateful Gift, Mai Thi Yoshimura
- Revue Starlight: The LIVE Seiran: Blue Glitter, Mahiru Tsuyuzaki

2021

- Revue Starlight: The LIVE #3: Growth, Mahiru Tsuyuzaki

2022

- Assault Lily: Lost Memories, Mai Thi Yoshimura
- Revue Starlight: Re LIVE: Reading Theatre, Mahiru Tsuyuzaki

2023

- Chainsaw Man The Stage, Kobeni Higashiyama
- Revue Starlight: The LIVE #4: Climax, Mahiru Tsuyuzaki

=== Live-action film ===
- Nemurubaka: Hypnic Jerks (2025), the lead vocalist of Hen'ai Structure (voice)
