= Goddess of Victory: Nikke =

2022 action role-playing game

- Developer: Shift Up
- Publisher: Level Infinite
- Director: Yoo Hyung-seok
- Producer: Hyung-tae Kim
- Artists: Hyung-tae Kim; KKUEM
- Composers: Cosmograph; Zekk; Feryquitous
- Engine: Unity
- Platforms: Android, iOS, Windows
- Release: Android, iOS; November 4, 2022; Microsoft Windows; February 15, 2023
- Genres: Third-person shooter, role-playing
- Modes: Single-player, multiplayer

Goddess of Victory: Nikke (Note: Stylized in all caps; Korean: 승리의 여신: 니케; formerly Nikke: The Goddess of Victory.) is a third-person shooter action role-playing video game developed by Shift Up and published by Level Infinite. Development of Nikke began as early as 2017, and it was released for Android and iOS in 2022, and Windows in 2023. The game's action-based battle system revolves around quick character-switching and the usage of combat skills in an anime-style environment. The game is free-to-play and features a gacha game system, through which in-app purchases are used as a method for monetization. It garnered over US$70 million in its first month of release.

Goddess of Victory: Nikke is set in a post-apocalyptic future where the surface of the Earth was overrun by mechanical aliens, called Raptures. The surviving humans fled underground and produced artificial soldiers called Nikkes. The story follows a Commander and his squad of Nikkes who hope to reclaim the surface.

== Gameplay ==
Depicted is one character under the player's control aiming a reticle towards the stage boss in the background.

Goddess of Victory: Nikke is a role-playing video game (RPG) in which the player controls one of up to five interchangeable characters (Nikkes) who are distributed in a row facing a battlefield and positioned behind a defensive object. A third-person shooter, the player aims a reticle to shoot at enemies and takes cover to reload—which automatically happens when a character is out of ammunition—allowing them to strategically plan their attacks. Each Nikke wields her own firearm and possess one of five possible elements that determine strengths and weaknesses when attacking foes. Characters each have three unique combat skills: two normal skills and one Burst skill, the latter is each assigned with a numeric value of up to three and requires users to accumulate enough cost, amassable through damaging enemies, before activating the initial Burst—subsequent skills can be activated immediately—and a temporary Full Burst mode is entered upon triggering the final skill, which significantly increases the attack power of all allies.

A stage ends once the player defeats a powerful boss following several swarms of basic enemies. Moreover, a special battle mode called the Interception requires the player to destroy a runaway locomotive throughout the stage. The game features a cooperative multiplayer mode of up to five players who can challenge the environment.

New characters are obtainable via a gacha game system, which costs in-game currency—acquirable by playing the game or via microtransactions—to use. While there is no pity system to guarantee rare characters, players can accumulate mileage tickets every time they draw from the gacha banner, and can exchange a certain number of mileage tickets for a featured character of their choice at the in-game shop. The player can raise characters' strengths by enhancing their levels and skills, increase their level caps, and equip better armour; the resources for all of those are obtainable by completing various quests.

== Story ==
Goddess of Victory: Nikke takes place in a post-apocalyptic future where the Earth was suddenly attacked by extraterrestrial mechanical creatures called Raptures that destroyed everything on the surface, forcing the remaining humans to take refuge underground and establish the Ark, a metropolis ruled by the Central Government. The PMC manufacturers Elysion, Missilis Industry and Tetra Line—owned by Ingrid, Syuen and Mustang, respectively—compose the "Big Three" and work on creating powerful feminine cyborgs, with human brains, to be called Nikkes and used as weapons to defeat the Raptures and restore humanity on the surface. Due to their prominence, the Big Three CEOs have very high authority; they are, however, heavily monitored by the Central Government to prevent any hostile behavior.

The story is played from the perspective of the Commander, who graduated from the Military Academy one day prior to the events of the game; despite this he performs extraordinarily in the operations and survives various encounters with rare Rapture species throughout the journey. He leads a squad called Counters, which consists of the Nikkes Anis, Rapi and later down the story, Neon. Other notable Nikkes in the franchise include Inherit squad leader Dorothy, as well as electrical engineer and Electric Shock squad leader Elegg. The Commander views Nikkes with sympathy and privately advocates for Nikke rights, which is illegal in accordance with the laws of the Ark. Outlaws may be sent to the Rehabilitation Center or the Outer Rim, an area fully isolated from the rest of the Ark, and they have formed terrorist organizations claiming to fight for human rights for themselves.

== Development and release ==
Nikke was developed by South Korean-based studio Shift Up working with Level Infinite, a publishing brand of Tencent Games. Development began between 2017 and 2018 with an internal planning competition of which one idea was selected to be the predecessor of the game. It was originally planned to be played from a first-person perspective but later was changed to incorporate battle poses inspired by the Gears of War series.

Shift Up's CEO Kim Hyung-tae, who was responsible for the production and illustrations of the game, said in an interview with IGN Japan that the battle environment features life-size models using Live2D, instead of chibi-style characters, to amplify sex appeal. Contributing composers include Hiroyuki Sawano, who produced one of the game's theme songs. Shift Up and Level Infinite hosted closed beta tests for the global version between the announcement and its release, allowing selected registrants to test out the game mechanics. The game contains voice-overs in English, Japanese and Korean.

Shift Up first revealed Nikke along with Stellar Blade at the Crank in Showcase event in 2019, with several trade exhibitions being held ahead of its launch, such as at BEXCO and Tokyo Game Show. The game was initially planned to be released worldwide for Android and iOS in 2020, but it was rescheduled and officially released on November 4, 2022. A Microsoft Windows version of the game was released on February 15, 2023, with, soon later, a brand collaboration with manga series Chainsaw Man that introduced characters therefrom as playable characters. The game has since collaborated with the RPG Nier: Automata in September of the same year and the anime Re:Zero in March 2024. Other collaborations throughout the rest of 2024 and 2025 have included Shift Up's own console game Stellar Blade, the anime Neon Genesis Evangelion, and Capcom's Resident Evil franchise.

On May 16th 2026, an animated spin-off of the series called Outpost: Off-Duty Tales was announced. Its first episode, "The Counters", was released on YouTube and Twitter on May 22nd. The next episode, "Marian" was released on June 7th.

== Adaptation ==
=== Manga ===
In October 26, 2026, a manga adaptation has been announced.

== Reception ==
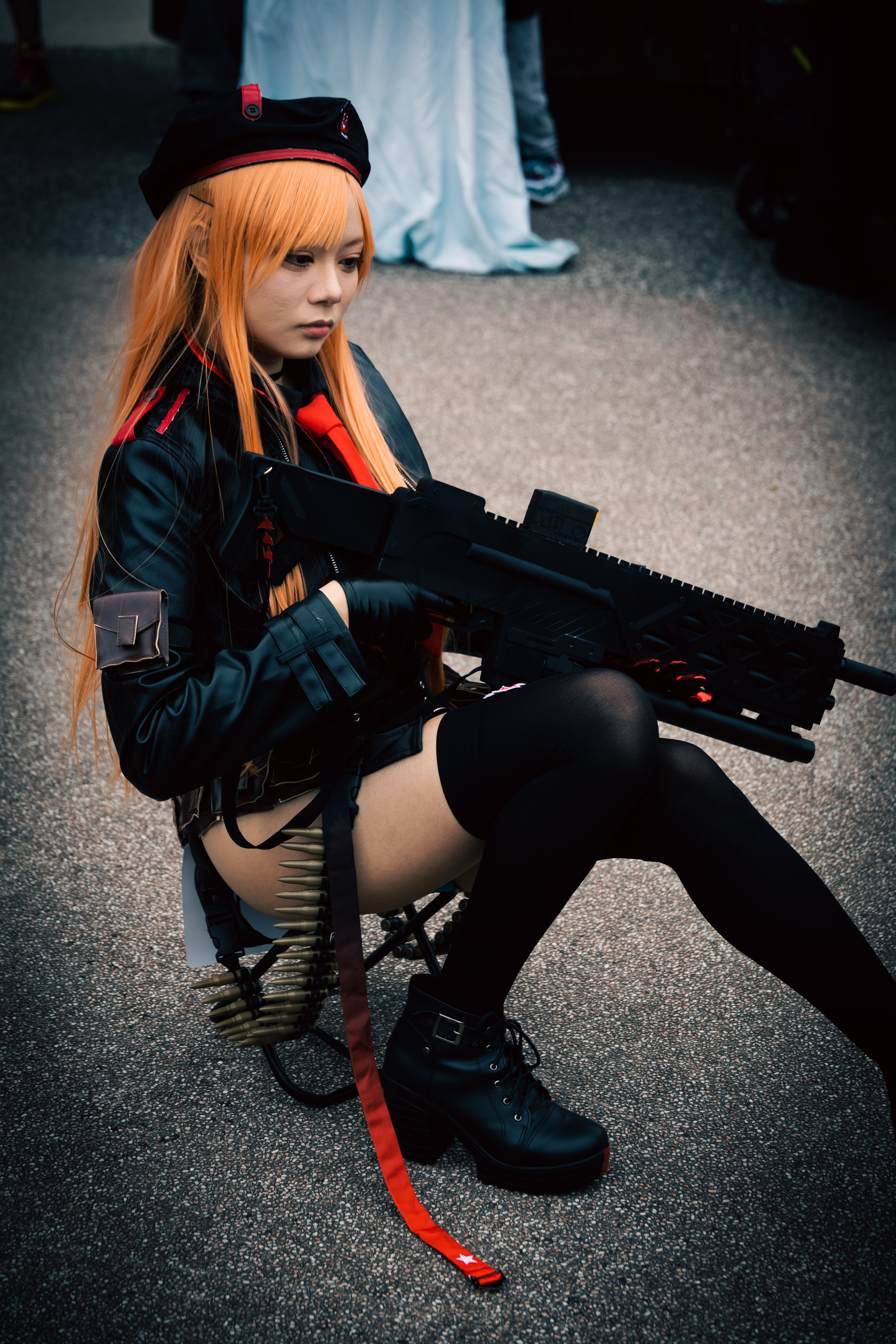
A cosplayer dressed as Rapi

Pete Davison of Rice Digital describes the story atmosphere as having "an interesting, almost Nier-esque melancholy". He remarks the early killing of Marian, calling it "a ballsy move" because it "means deliberately eschewing potential income".

According to data analysis from SensorTower, Nikke grossed over $70 million in revenue in its first month of release, which was mostly generated from Japan, South Korea, and the United States. It reached a total of $400 million less than one year after its release, and saw over 25 million downloads before the Windows port's release. PocketGamer.biz reported that though the game's "excess of fanservice" played a significant role in its "more than respectable levels of success", its unique gacha mechanics may have also been a contributing factor.

Goddess of Victory: Nikke was nominated for the Famitsu Dengeki Game Awards 2022's "Best App" category.

=== Controversies ===
Following the release of a character costume, players criticized Tencent for having the design altered from beta versions to show less revealing clothing. Since Tencent is based in China, its video games must adhere to the censorship policies of China in addition to those of other jurisdictions.

In January 2023, an official Thai advertisement—which depicted a Nikke player watching Anis', Rapi's and Marian's bouncing buttocks and fantasizing about such with cosplayers—was taken down and apologized for by Tencent after they received backlash from Thai fans who were unhappy with the portrayal of the playerbase. This pullback, however, faced another backlash from a different portion of fans who were already upset with the censorship, claiming that "there is nothing wrong with the ad for being honest about why some players are attracted to the game".

On May 22, 2025, Shift Up released the Chinese version of the game. Upon release, it was discovered that this version featured many improvements that the global players had been requesting since the original release, which caused an influx of negative reviews from global players.

In October 2026, the game's Windows launcher was compromised in a supply-chain attack, allowing attackers to use an installed launcher to steal users' credentials including browser passwords, cookies, and cryptocurrency wallets.

=== Cultural impact ===
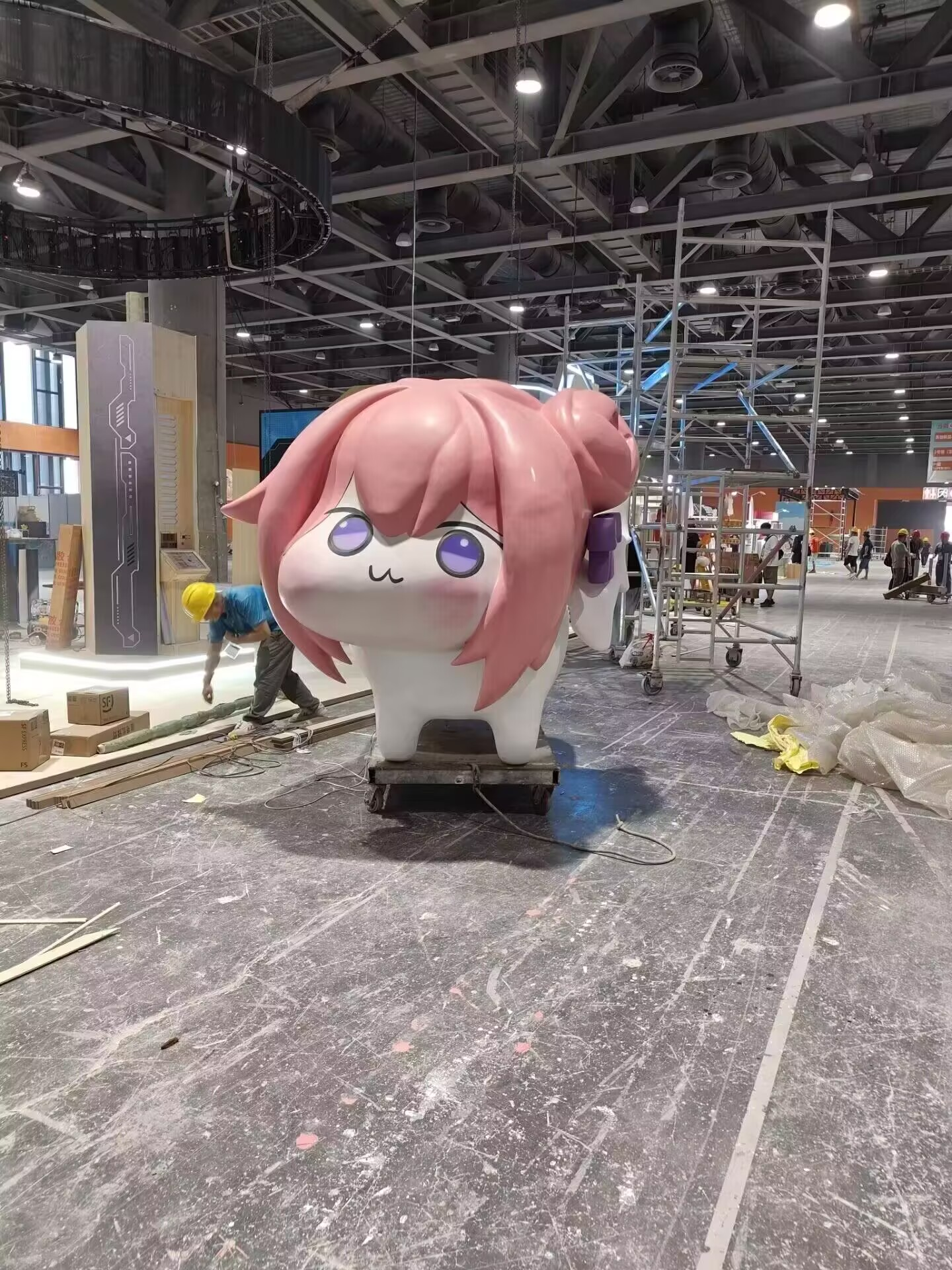
A Dororong statue at the 2025 Guangzhou Comic Convention

An internet meme named "Dororong" (also known as "Doro"), which centers a fan-made character created by a Goddess of Victory: Nikke fan as a meme version of the character Dorothy, became popular among the fandom and widely known as the game's unofficial mascot. Shift Up has officially acquired and trademarked the character, also steadily incorporating the character into its IPs.
