= Poppin'Party =

Japanese band

- Poppin'Party in a promotional artwork for BanG Dream!'s second season. From left to right: Sāya, Rimi, Kasumi, Tae, Arisa

Background information
- Genres: Pop rock; anime song
- Years active: 2015–present
- Label: Bushiroad Music
- Spinoff of: BanG Dream!
- Members: Aimi (Kasumi Toyama); Sae Ōtsuka (Tae Hanazono); Rimi Nishimoto (Rimi Ushigome); Ayasa Itō (Arisa Ichigaya); Ayaka Ōhashi (Sāya Yamabuki)
- Website: en.bang-dream.com/artists/poppinparty/

Poppin'Party is a Japanese all-female band that was formed in 2015 as part of Bushiroad's media franchise BanG Dream!. The group's members are voice actresses who portray fictional characters in the franchise's anime series and mobile game BanG Dream! Girls Band Party!.

The band consists of Aimi (lead vocals, rhythm guitar), Sae Ōtsuka (lead guitar), Rimi Nishimoto (bass), Ayaka Ōhashi (drums), and Ayasa Itō (keyboard). In the anime and game, the band is represented by Kasumi Toyama (Aimi), Tae Hanazono (Ōtsuka), Rimi Ushigome (Nishimoto), Sāya Yamabuki (Ōhashi), and Arisa Ichigaya (Itō). Poppin'Party serves as the protagonists of the anime, which began airing in 2017.

Of BanG Dream!'s twelve bands, Poppin'Party is one of seven whose members play their own music during live concerts. The band has produced 19 singles and two albums.

== History ==
=== Early history (2015–2016) ===
The BanG Dream! franchise was created by Bushiroad founder Takaaki Kidani with the premise of voice actresses who were capable of playing their own instruments in live performances. He received inspiration for the concept when a staff member attended The Idolmaster Masters of Idol World!! 2014 concert at Saitama Super Arena, where Aimi's ability to sing and play guitar piqued their interest, and they approached Kidani about her leading an all-female band; Kidani figured such a concept would be best executed as a media franchise.

At her Love Generation concert on February 28, 2015, Aimi announced she would form a band under the BanG Dream! umbrella and serve as its vocalist and guitarist. Rimi Nishimoto and Ayasa Itō joined the project in April as bassist and keyboardist, respectively. Their first live show, I Started a Band in Spring!, took place on April 18, 2015, at Shimokitazawa Garden. The three played 12 songs, 11 of which were cover versions of popular anime music, with the exception being the original song "Yes! BanG_Dream!". Composed by Elements Garden's Noriyasu Agematsu, it was released as Poppin'Party's debut single on February 24, 2016. During the concert, Aimi lost her voice, which was later used as a plot point for her character Kasumi in the anime.

The band's name Poppin'Party was revealed in the magazine Monthly Bushiroad prior to their second show. Officially known as Instruments × Girls = Justice! and held on June 14 at Shinjuku Loft, the live saw the introduction of Sae Ōtsuka as guitarist. A week later, Aimi conducted a solo concert at CharaExpo 2015 in Singapore for the franchise's first performance outside of Japan. Drummer Ayaka Ōhashi joined the group as the fifth and final member during the Welcome! Poppin'Party!!!!! concert on October 11 at Differ Ariake. In its early stages, the band's performances were inspired by fellow all-female band Silent Siren; the two groups would collaborate for the Battle of the Bands-style No Girl No Cry concert at the MetLife Dome on May 18–19, 2019. Poppin'Party and Silent Siren also released a single by the same name on July 31, 2019.

In 2016, Poppin'Party started hosting in-character concerts beginning with BanG Dream! First Live Sprin'Party 2016! on April 24, 2016. The band grew in popularity with their performances over the year, with the Second Live Starrin'Party 2016! on November 13 selling out much of its tickets shortly after opening sales in mid-October. In the summer, the group performed at Animelo Summer Live, which helped boost sales of their third single "On Your New Journey / Tear Drops" (Note: English titles are from the English-language franchise website.) to 11,301 copies in its first week of release; in comparison, "Yes! BanG_Dream!" had less than 1,500 initial-week sales, while their second single "Star Beat!" sold 3,414. In December, "On Your New Journey / Tear Drops" ranked tenth on the Oricon Weekly Singles Chart, the first time an anime-based artist had a single in an Oricon chart's top ten prior to their show's airing.

=== Anime release and first album (2017–2019) ===
The anime began broadcast in 2017, with the band's members portraying the main characters. Currently consisting of three seasons, the series features Poppin'Party songs as theme music: the first season used "Tokimeki Experience!" and "Sparkling Dreaming: Sing Girls" as its opening and ending, respectively; the second featured "Kizuna Music" and "Jumpin'"; and the third had "Initial" and "Straight Through Our Dreams!".

"Tokimeki Experience!" and "Sparkling Dreaming: Sing Girls" were released as singles on February 1 and 15, 2017, respectively. The two songs were performed by the band at the 3rd Live Sparklin'Party at Tokyo Dome City Hall on February 5. Poppin'Party's next single "Keep On Moving! / Sunflower Dreams", whose included tracks were insert songs in the anime, saw a May 10 release. On August 21, Poppin'Party participated in the 4th Live Miracle Party 2017! at the Nippon Budokan, which quickly sold out its 11,000 tickets prior to general sale, prompting Live Viewing Japan to live broadcast the concert in theaters. During the concert, the band debuted the song "Time Lapse", which was released as their seventh single on September 20; it sold 10,603 copies in its first week to rank a then-best sixth on the Oricon Weekly Chart. A third 2017 single "Our Christmas Song" came out on December 13; its coupling track "B.O.F." was used as a theme song for the anime Future Card Buddyfight X.

Poppin'Party's ninth single "CiRCLING" came out on February 21, 2018, as part of a dual-release day with fellow BanG Dream! band Roselia's "Opera of the wasteland". The two groups held the BanG Dream! 5th Live at Makuhari Messe—with Poppin'Party's concert being named Happy Party 2018!—on May 12–13. Another single "Double Rainbow / Excellent (Hey, Let's Go!)" was released on July 11 and became the band's first single to appear in Oricon's top five when it peaked at fourth; "Excellent (Hey, Let's Go)!" later served as the opening to Future Card Buddyfight Ace, and Aimi and Nishimoto also voiced characters in the show. In August, Poppin'Party returned to Animelo Summer Live, where they performed "Tear Drops", "Sparkling Dreaming: Sing Girls", and a cover of "God Knows" from Haruhi Suzumiya, while Ōtsuka and Nishimoto partnered with Maon Kurosaki and Luna Haruna to cover "Shunkan Sentimental" from Fullmetal Alchemist: Brotherhood. Another cover collaboration had taken place in March at Animax Musix 2018 Osaka as the band worked with OxT for a cover of OxT vocalist Masayoshi Ōishi's song "Kimi Ja Nakya Dame Mitai". The band's 11th single "Girl's Code", which Real Sound noted had more bittersweet lyrical content in the titular track and its B-side "Setsunai Sandglass" than other Poppin'Party songs, received an October 3 release. Two months later, they played on the 6th Live's second day (titled Let's Go Poppin'Party!) on December 8 at Ryōgoku Kokugikan; "Kizuna Music" saw its debut at the concert followed by its release as a single four days later.

The band's first album Poppin'on! was released on January 30, 2019. Consisting of their first 11 singles with acoustic versions of some songs, the album peaked at fourth in the Oricon Albums Chart. The 12th single "Jumpin'" was one of six released by the franchise on February 20 (each band produced a single); every single would rank in the Oricon Daily Chart's top ten for February 19, with "Jumpin'" being the fourth-highest in sixth. "Dreamers Go! / Returns", released on May 15, enjoyed a fourth-place ranking on the Oricon Weekly Chart. Poppin'Party made a third appearance at Animelo Summer Live in early September, performing "Tear Drops" with the festival's band, "Star Beat!", and Kizuna Music". In December, the group partnered with beverage producer Kirin Company to promote its Gogo no Kōcha tea line by creating the song "White Afternoon"; Sanzigen, who animated the second season of BanG Dream!, produced a 30-second advertisement for the collaboration. A full version of "White Afternoon" received a digital release on December 9. Performances during the year included the BanG Dream! 7th Live at the Budokan on February 23 (the band performed on the third day, titled Jumpin' Music), No Girl No Cry with Silent Siren in May, and a guest appearance at Rock in Japan Festival on August 11.

=== Topping the Oricon charts (2020–present) ===
In January 2020, Poppin'Party's 15th single "Initial / Straight Through Our Dreams!" became the first of the franchise to top Oricon's weekly chart after selling 27,000 copies from January 7 to 11. Prior to this, the band's best-performing singles were "Double Rainbow / Excellent (Hey, Let's Go!)", "Kizuna Music", and "Dreamers Go! / Returns", all of which ranked fourth. At the end of the year, "Initial / Straight Through Our Dreams!" was ranked as the 86th-best-selling single by Billboard Japan.

The band's second album Breakthrough! was released on June 24, 2020; it was originally planned for a June 3 debut before being postponed due to the COVID-19 pandemic in Japan. The album, which contains the band's four latest singles, sold 10,269 copies in its first day to top Oricon's daily chart; after one week, it had 20,988 sales to rank first on Billboard Japan's Hot Albums listing for July 6. Poppin'Party's first live of the year was Special Live: Summerly Tone on August 23, the final day of the BanG Dream! 8th Live at Fuji-Q Highland Conifer Forest; the band was joined by Morfonica and Pastel Palettes' Ami Maeshima with Raise A Suilen, while RAS' Raychell and Roselia's Aina Aiba performed "Straight Through Our Dreams!" with Poppin'Party to end the show. The band held a solo, second show under the 8th Live banner titled Breakthrough! on October 8–9 at the Tokyo Garden Theater; the two days were named Kirakira Festa Day! and Dokidoki Special Day!.

Poppin'Party's 16th single "Photograph" was released on January 6, 2021; the song was used as the month's ending theme song for TV Asahi's television program Onegai! Ranking. The single sold over 10,000 copies in its first week to top the Oricon Daily Charts twice and become the band's second number-one weekly single, while also being the week's best-selling single on Billboard Japan's chart. On February 23, the band held a joint "Friendship Live" with Morfonica, titled Astral Harmony, at Yokohama Arena. A second No Girl No Cry concert with Silent Siren, branded No Girl No Cry Round 2, took place on March 27. Poppin'Party and Roselia performed together at the BanG Dream! 9th Live, subtitled The Beginning, on August 21–22 at Fuji-Q Highland Conifer Forest. The two bands played at Animax Musix 2021 at Yokohama Arena on November 20, which was preceded by Ōhashi being the show's opening act in which she performed her solo song "Noisy Love Power" from the anime Magical Girl Ore. Aimi and Ōtsuka also hosted a series of acoustic music shows, called Kasumi and Tae's Stay After School Tour, with stops at Zepp's Namba (October 17), Nagoya (November 7), and Yokohama (November 17) venues.

A five-song mini-album Live Beyond!! was released on August 18, 2021. Two of the tracks, "A Song No More" (Note: Japanese title: "Koko Kara Saki wa Uta ni Naranai" (ここから先は歌にならない); English title is from the English-language website.) and "Moonlight Walk", were used as themes for the shows Remake Our Life! and The Fruit of Evolution, respectively. Another song "Your Beginning!" (Note: Japanese title: "Kimi ga Hajimaru!" (キミが始まる！); English title is from the English-language website.) is the theme song for the Nintendo Switch port of Girls Band Party!.

BanG Dream! Poppin'Dream!, a movie focusing on Poppin'Party, premiered on January 1, 2022. Four days later, the film's theme song "Poppin'Dream!" was released as the band's 17th single. One of the single's supporting tracks "Introduction" was written by Ayase of Yoasobi in the franchise's first "tie-up" partnership song with unaffiliated artists. Another single, "Shut Away in Summer", was released on August 31.

== Members ==
- Aimi (Kasumi Toyama, lead vocals and rhythm guitar): Aimi was the first voice actress to join the BanG Dream! project after catching Kidani's attention during a concert for The Idolmaster in 2014; she officially became part of the franchise in February 2015. Prior to Poppin'Party, she played guitar in a high school band but stopped after graduating. She co-hosts the franchise-centric variety show Bandori! TV with fellow BanG Dream! voice actress Ami Maeshima.
- Sae Ōtsuka (Tae Hanazono, lead guitar): Ōtsuka was the fourth member to join the franchise after doing so at Instruments × Girls = Justice!. Before BanG Dream!, she played the acoustic guitar but had no experience with voice acting or the electric guitar.
- Rimi Nishimoto (Rimi Ushigome, bass): Nishimoto joined Poppin'Party at the first BanG Dream! live. When she joined the franchise, she was proficient in piano and guitar but had the least experience with the bass. Nishimoto had first auditioned for Tantei Opera Milky Holmes, from which she was recruited by Kidani to join Poppin'Party as he felt "she had something special back then."
- Ayaka Ōhashi (Sāya Yamabuki, drums): The last member to join the band, Ōhashi was introduced in the franchise's fourth live performance. She already possessed drumming experience before joining the franchise.
- Ayasa Itō (Arisa Ichigaya, keyboard): Itō debuted with Nishimoto at the first BanG Dream! concert. In addition to keyboard, she also plays the tambourine for the band. Itō had little musical experience before Poppin'Party's formation, having last played piano in elementary school.

== In-universe band ==
Band logo

Besides live performances, Poppin'Party's members voice characters in the BanG Dream! anime series and other animated media. Fictionally, Poppin'Party is formed by Kasumi Toyama in her journey to rediscover the "Star Beat", and the astral theme is represented through their lyrics and outfits; the latter, which resemble school uniforms, feature a celestial motif. Although their raw skill is not the best, they make up for this with their strong energy and innate connection between each other.

The first season of the anime follows Poppin'Party's creation and efforts to perform at live house SPACE, while the second details the band's plans of organizing a self-sponsored live show. For the third season, Poppin'Party enters the Girls Band Challenge competition alongside Roselia and Raise A Suilen. In the main story mode of Girls Band Party!, Poppin'Party helps the player character recruit bands for the titular event.

Novelist Kō Nakamura was tasked with creating the band's fictional personas. Nakamura has noted that the first letters in the names of Kasumi's bandmates spell "STAR" (Sāya, Tae, Arisa, Rimi), which reflects the band's starry image but is coincidental. Aspects of Poppin'Party's formation were based on Nakamura's high school band: examples included their origins stemming from classmates who wished to create a band together and the guitarist (Kasumi in Poppin'Party's case) finding a guitar in a pawnshop, while Poppin'Party and Nakamura's group both conducted meetings in a warehouse. Further inspiration was drawn from photos of The Beatles performing at the Nippon Budokan, which Nakamura set as Poppin'Party's ultimate goal; the real-life band would perform at the arena as part of the fourth and seventh BanG Dream! live concerts.

Various elements of the characters and story are also inspired by their voice actresses. The character designs were loosely modeled after their actresses to reflect their musical abilities, while shared personality traits include Tae and Ōtsuka owning a large collection of pet rabbits. Certain events in the anime mirror experiences at the franchise's lives; for instance, Kasumi's voice loss in the first season is based on the same occurring to Aimi during the band's debut show.

BanG Dream!'s first work, the manga BanG_Dream! Star Beat by Nakamura and Aya Ishida, contained numerous differences in character traits that were retconned in later media.

== Discography ==
As of September 28, 2022, Poppin'Party has produced 58 original songs, including five image songs by their members, and 19 singles. Nakamura writes the lyrics for Poppin'Party songs, while Kasumi is credited as the in-universe lyricist; to better connect with Kasumi, Nakamura's songwriting process emulates how he believes she would do so, such as using dictionaries and consulting her friends. Elements Garden's members like Agematsu and Junpei Fujita oversee the songs' composition and arrangement.

In addition to their two albums and the Live Beyond!! mini-album, Poppin'Party and the other bands in the BanG Dream! franchise have cover songs compiled into albums called Cover Collections; the fourth album topped Oricon's weekly singles chart in June 2020.

=== Singles ===
Year	Title (Note: Some singles are double A-side.)	Main track	Coupling track (Note: Instrumental versions of both songs are also included.)	Release date	Peak Oricon chart position	Notes	Ref
2016	"Yes! BanG_Dream!"	"Yes! BanG_Dream!"	"Poppin' Shuffle" (ぽっぴん’しゃっふる, Poppin' Shaffuru)	February 24	52		
2016	"Star Beat!"	"Star Beat!" (STAR BEAT!〜ホシノコドウ〜, STAR BEAT! ~Hoshi no Kodou~)	"Summer Skies & Sun! Sun! Seven!" (夏空 SUN! SUN! SEVEN!, Natsuzora SUN! SUN! SEVEN!)	August 3	27		
2016	"On Your New Journey / Tear Drops"	"On Your New Journey" (走り始めたばかりのキミに, Hashiri Hajimeta Bakari no Kimi ni)	"Tear Drops" (ティアドロップス, Tiadoroppusu)	December 7	10		
2017	"Tokimeki Experience!"	"Exciting Experience!" (ときめきエクスペリエンス！, Tokimeki Ekusuperiensu)	"1000 Crying Skies" (1000回潤んだ空, 1000-kai Urunda Sora)	February 1	12	Anime first season opening	
2017	"Sparkling Dreaming: Sing Girls"	"Sparkling Dreaming: Sing Girls" (キラキラだとか夢だとか ～Sing Girls～, Kirakira da toka Yume da toka ~Sing Girls~)	"Happy Happy Party!"	February 15	11	Anime first season ending	
2017	"Keep On Moving! / Sunflower Dreams"	"Keep On Moving!" (前へススメ！, Mae e Susume!)	"Sunflower Dreams" (夢みるSunflower, Yumemiru Sunflower)	May 10	12		
2017	"Time Lapse"	"Time Lapse"	"If in August" (八月のif, Hachigatsu no if), "Boom Through Summer!" (夏のドーン！, Natsunodon!)	September 20	6		
2017	"Our Christmas Song"	"Our Christmas Song" (クリスマスのうた, Kurisumasu no Uta)	"B.O.F.", "Your Gift to Me" (キミにもらったもの, Kimi ni Moratta Mono)	December 13	16		
2018	"CiRCLING"	"CiRCLING"	"Light Delight"	March 21	7		
2018	"Double Rainbow / Excellent (Hey, Let's Go!)"	"Double Rainbow" (二重の虹(ダブル レインボウ), Nijū no Niji (Daburu Reinbō))	"Excellent (Hey, Let's Go!)" (最高(さあ行こう)！, Saikō (Sā Ikou)!)	July 11	4		
2018	"Girls Code"	"Girls Code" (ガールズコード, Gāruzu Kōdo)	"Painful Sandglass" (切ないSandglass, Setsunai Sandglass)	October 3	5		
2018	"Kizuna Music" (Note: Officially stylized in all caps.)	"Bonding Music♪" (キズナミュージック♪, Kizuna Myujikku♪)	"Home Street"	December 12	4	Anime second season opening	
2019	"Jumpin'"	"Jumpin'"	"What's the POPIPA!?"	February 20	6	Anime second season ending	
2019	"Dreamers Go! / Returns"	"Dreamers Go!"	"Returns"	May 15	4		
2020	"Initial / Straight Through Our Dreams!"	"Initial" (イニシャル, Inishiaru)	"Straight Through Our Dreams!" (夢を撃ち抜く瞬間に！, Yume o Uchinuku Shunkan ni!), "Sakura Memories" (Kirakira), "Anniversary" (Dokidoki)	January 8	1	Released in Kirakira and Dokidoki versions with different coupling tracks; anime third season themes	
2021	"Photograph"	"Photograph"	"Dream when you open it!" (開けたらDream!, Aketara Dream!)	January 6	1		
2022	"Poppin'Dream!"	"Poppin'Dream!" (ぽっぴん'どりーむ！, Poppin' Dorīmu!)	"Star Promise" (星の約束, Hoshi no Yakusoku), "Introduction"	January 5	4	BanG Dream! Poppin'Dream! theme music	
2022	"Shut Away in Summer"	"Shut Away in Summer" (夏に閉じこめて, Natsu ni Tojikomete)	"Courage Limit!" (勇気Limit！, Yūki Limit!)	August 31	13	Limited edition includes Poppin'Dream! soundtrack	
2024	"In a New Season"	"In a New Season" (新しい季節に, Atarashii Kisetsu ni)	"Alrighty!" (ほな！, Hona!), "Chu Chueen!"	January 24	16		
2024	"Tarinai / Tremolo Eyes"	"Tarinai"	"Tremolo Eyes" (トレモロアイズ, Toremoro Aizu)	July 17	13		
2025	"Drive Your Heart"	"Drive Your Heart"	"Special Answer" (とっておきAnswer, Totte oki Answer), "Collecting Blue Skies Worldwide" (世界中の青空をあつめて, Sekaiju no aozora o atsumete)	December 24	4		
2026	"Heart-Fluttering Date"	"Heart-Fluttering Date" (どきどきデエト, Dokidoki Dēto)	"Game Changer"	April 29	10		

==== Other ====
Year	Title	Release date	Peak Oricon chart position	Notes	Ref
2017	"Doki Doki SING OUT!" (どきどきSING OUT!)	April 5	22	Kasumi Toyama character song	
2017	"Flower Garden Electric Guitar!!!" (花園電気ギター！！！, Hanazono Denki Gīta!!!)	June 21	18	Tae Hanazono character song	
2017	"Chocolate Bass Recipe" (チョコレイトの低音レシピ, Chokoreito no Teion Reshipi)	June 21	20	Rimi Ushigome character song	
2017	"A Distant Heartbeat" (遠い音楽 ～ハートビート～, Tooi Ongaku ~Hātobīto~)	July 26	20	Sāya Yamabuki character song	
2017	"I, I Never Said Love!" (す、好きなんかじゃない！, Su, Suki Nanka Janai!)	July 26	21	Arisa Ichigaya character song	
2018	"Choco Cornet Love" (私の心はチョココロネ, Watashi no Kokoro wa Choko Korone)	April 23	—	Digital release	
2019	"No Girl No Cry"	July 31	18	Collaboration single with Silent Siren	
2019	"White Afternoon"	December 9	—	Digital release; theme song for Kirin Company's Gogo no Kōcha collaboration CM	

=== Albums ===
Year	Title	Release date	Peak Oricon chart position	Notes	Ref
2018	BanG Dream! Girls Band Party! Cover Collection Vol. 1 (バンドリ！ ガールズバンドパーティ！ カバーコレクション Vol.1)	June 27	6	Joined by Roselia, Afterglow, Pastel Palettes, and Hello, Happy World!	
2019	Poppin'on!	January 30	4		
2019	BanG Dream! Girls Band Party! Cover Collection Vol. 2 (バンドリ！ ガールズバンドパーティ！ カバーコレクション Vol.2)	March 13	6	Joined by Roselia, Afterglow, Pastel Palettes, Hello, Happy World! (Note: Also joined by Raise A Suilen (Cover Collection Volumes 3 and 4) and Morfonica (Volume 4).)	
2019	"BanG Dream! FILM LIVE" Insert Song Collection (「BanG Dream! FILM LIVE」劇中歌コレクション)	September 25	16	Joined by Roselia, Afterglow, Pastel Palettes, Hello, Happy World!	
2019	BanG Dream! Girls Band Party! Cover Collection Vol. 3 (バンドリ！ ガールズバンドパーティ！ カバーコレクション Vol.3)	December 18	4	Joined by Roselia, Afterglow, Pastel Palettes, Hello, Happy World!	
2020	BanG Dream! Girls Band Party! Cover Collection Vol. 4 (バンドリ！ ガールズバンドパーティ！ カバーコレクション Vol.4)	May 27	1	Joined by Roselia, Afterglow, Pastel Palettes, Hello, Happy World!	
2020	BanG Dream! Girls Band Party! Cover Collection Special Selection (バンドリ！ ガールズバンドパーティ！カバコレ Special Selection)	June 1	—	Poppin'Party's cover of "Kimi Ja Nakya Dame Mitai" featured as one of five in album (Note: Joined by Roselia, Afterglow, Pastel Palettes, and Hello, Happy World!.)	
2020	Breakthrough!	June 24	3	Originally planned for June 3 release but delayed due to COVID-19 pandemic	
2020	Garupa Vocaloid Cover Collection (ガルパ ボカロカバーコレクション)	December 16	4	Joined by Roselia, Afterglow, Pastel Palettes, Hello, Happy World!, Raise A Suilen, and Morfonica	
2021	BanG Dream! Girls Band Party! Cover Collection Vol. 5 (バンドリ！ ガールズバンドパーティ！ カバーコレクションVol.5)	February 24	6	Joined by Roselia, Afterglow, Pastel Palettes, Hello, Happy World!, Raise A Suilen, and Morfonica	
2021	Live Beyond!!	August 18	10	Mini-album	
2021	"BanG Dream! FILM LIVE 2nd Stage" Special Songs	August 25	13	Joined by Roselia, Afterglow, Pastel Palettes, Hello, Happy World!, Raise A Suilen, and Morfonica	
2021	BanG Dream! Girls Band Party! Cover Collection Vol. 6 (バンドリ！ ガールズバンドパーティ！ カバーコレクションVol.6)	November 10	4	Joined by Roselia, Afterglow, Pastel Palettes, Hello, Happy World!, Raise A Suilen, and Morfonica	
2022	BanG Dream! Dreamer's Best	March 16	6	Fan vote-determined compilation album with Poppin'Party's "Kizuna Music", "Returns", and "Initial" included	
2022	BanG Dream! Girls Band Party! Cover Collection Vol. 7 (バンドリ！ ガールズバンドパーティ！ カバーコレクションVol.7)	December 14	13	Joined by Roselia, Afterglow, Pastel Palettes, Hello, Happy World!, Raise A Suilen, and Morfonica	
2023	"Youth To Be Continued" (青春 To Be Continued, Seishun To Be Continued)	May 31	9	Mini-album	
2025	Popigenic	February 26	15		

=== Live albums ===
Year	Title	Release date	Peak Oricon chart position	Notes	Ref
2018	Poppin'Party 2015–2017 LIVE BEST	May 30	9		
2019	BanG Dream! 6th☆LIVE	November 27	10	Joined by Roselia, Raise A Suilen, and Hello, Happy World! (Note: Joined by Afterglow, Pastel Palettes, and Glitter Green for 7th☆LIVE.)	
2020	TOKYO MX presents 「BanG Dream! 7th☆LIVE」COMPLETE BOX	February 19	3	Joined by Roselia, Raise A Suilen, and Hello, Happy World!	
2020	TOKYO MX presents「BanG Dream! 7th☆LIVE」 DAY3：Poppin'Party「Jumpin' Music♪」	February 19	14		
2021	Poppin'Party x SILENT SIREN VS Live "NO GIRL NO CRY" at MetLife Dome	April 28	17	Joined by Silent Siren, Roselia, and Raise A Suilen	
