= Rimi Nishimoto =

Japanese voice actress and musician

- 西本りみ
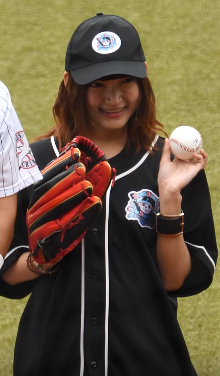
- Nishimoto at a BanG Dream! promotion with Pacific League baseball in 2018
- Born: October 25, 1994 (age 31); Hyōgo, Japan
- Occupation: Voice actress
- Years active: 2016–present
- Agent: HiBiKi
- Musical career
- Instruments: Vocals; Bass guitar
- Years active: 2015–present
- Member of: Poppin'Party

Rimi Nishimoto (西本りみ, Nishimoto Rimi; born October 25, 1994) is a Japanese voice actress and musician. Affiliated with the HiBiKi talent agency, she plays the bass guitar for the band Poppin'Party of the BanG Dream! franchise, which includes portraying the character Rimi Ushigome.

== Career ==
Nishimoto became interested in voice acting after watching the anime Mirmo! in elementary school. She began playing the piano and Electone at the age of three and the guitar at 14, and was a euphonium and saxophone player in her middle and high schools' band clubs.

In April 2013, Nishimoto auditioned for a spot in the Bushiroad franchise Tantei Opera Milky Holmes and qualified for the finals. Although Ayasa Itō ultimately won the role, Nishimoto's guitar playing caught Bushiroad head Takaaki Kidani's interest and she was later recruited for his new music project BanG Dream! as a bassist; at the time, Nishimoto had the least experience with the bass compared to the guitar and piano. Nishimoto, along with Itō and Aimi, comprised the original cast for the first BanG_Dream! live on April 18, 2015, and the three would form the band Poppin'Party with Sae Ōtsuka and Ayaka Ōhashi. In addition to live concerts, Nishimoto's role in the franchise included portraying Rimi Ushigome in the anime and mobile game BanG Dream! Girls Band Party!; certain aspects of her character were also inspired by her real-life personality. A Rimi-based image song by Nishimoto titled "Chocolate no Teion Recipe" was released on June 21, 2017; the single peaked at 20th on the Oricon Weekly Singles Chart.

In 2016, Nishimoto voiced Unne Sonosaki in the Bushiroad short series We Are the Luck & Logic Club!, followed by Amol in Hina Logi: From Luck & Logic a year later. She also portrayed Haru Mikado in the 2018 show Future Card Buddyfight Ace, which featured Poppin'Party's "Saa Ikō!" as the opening theme music. Nishimoto voiced Fumi Futagawa in the 2020 anime Assault Lily Bouquet and its spin-off series Assault Lily Fruits. She portrayed Lulune in the 2021 anime The Fruit of Evolution.

== Personal life ==
Nishimoto graduated from university in 2017. During her first year of college, she received a second Microsoft Office Specialist certification in Microsoft Word and Excel and a second-level grade in the secretary proficiency exam.

== Filmography ==
=== Anime ===
Year	Title	Role	Notes
2016	We Are the Luck & Logic Club!	Unne Sonosaki	
2017	Hina Logic: From Luck & Logic	Amol	
2017	BanG Dream!	Rimi Ushigome	
2018	BanG Dream! Girls Band Party! Pico	Rimi Ushigome	
2018	Future Card Buddyfight Ace	Haru Mikado	
2019	BanG Dream! 2nd Season	Rimi Ushigome	
2019	BanG Dream! Film Live	Rimi Ushigome	Movie
2020	BanG Dream! 3rd Season	Rimi Ushigome	
2020	BanG Dream! Girls Band Party! ☆ Pico ~Ohmori~	Rimi Ushigome	
2020	Assault Lily Bouquet	Fumi Futagawa	
2021	Assault Lily Fruits	Fumi Futagawa	
2021	BanG Dream! Episode of Roselia	Rimi Ushigome	Two-part film series
2021	BanG Dream! Film Live 2nd Stage	Rimi Ushigome	Movie
2021	BanG Dream! Girls Band Party! Pico Fever!	Rimi Ushigome	
2021	The Fruit of Evolution	Lulune	
2022	BanG Dream! Poppin'Dream!	Rimi Ushigome	Movie

=== Video games ===
Year	Title	Role	Notes
2017–present	BanG Dream! Girls Band Party!	Rimi Ushigome	
2020	Azur Lane	KMS Weser	
