= Sae Ōtsuka =

Japanese voice actress

- 大塚 紗英
- Born: October 10, 1995 (age 31)
- Occupations: Voice actress; singer
- Agent: Ace Crew Entertainment (2015–2022)
- Musical career
- Instruments: Vocals; guitar
- Years active: 2015–present
- Member of: Poppin'Party
- Website: saeotsuka.net

Sae Ōtsuka (大塚 紗英, Ōtsuka Sae; born October 10, 1995) is a Japanese voice actress and singer. She plays the guitar for the band Poppin'Party of the BanG Dream! franchise, which includes portraying the character Tae Hanazono.

== Career ==
Ōtsuka grew up playing with a toy piano that her mother purchased for her, while she wrote her first song when she was five years old after listening to a nursery rhyme. She was part of her elementary school's music committee, which involved playing music during the morning assemblies, and was in her middle school's band club as a trombonist. At the age of 15, Ōtsuka began street performing with an acoustic guitar, which she did for four years.

In December 2014, Ōtsuka was recruited to join the Bushiroad music franchise BanG Dream! as the guitarist Tae Hanazono; at the time, she had no voice acting or electric guitar experience. She was formally introduced to the franchise band Poppin'Party during its second live concert on June 14, 2015. Various aspects of Tae's character were inspired by Ōtsuka, such as Tae conducting street performances during the second season of the anime. Tae's friendship with Raise A Suilen's Rei Wakana is also based on Ōtsuka's connections with Rei's voice actress and Ace Crew colleague Raychell. Ōtsuka would perform with RAS during its role as a backup band in 2018 and as a guest at its debut live; she also made guest appearances at the band's Heaven and Earth show in 2019 and its stage play in 2020. In late 2021, Ōtsuka and Poppin'Party bandmate Aimi conducted a series of acoustic guitar shows, called Kasumi and Tae's Stay After School Tour, with performances at Zepp's Namba, Nagoya, and Yokohama venues.

In 2020, she joined Bushiroad's D4DJ franchise as Nagisa Tsukimiyama, guitarist of the group Rondo. Her graduation from the project was announced on September 30, 2024.

As a solo performer, Ōtsuka's first song "What's your Identity?" was used as the Japanese opening to the Chinese-animated show Egg Car in 2019. Avant-title, her debut mini-album, was released on February 26, 2020.

== Personal life ==
Ōtsuka owns numerous pets like rabbits and birds, the former of which was adopted as a character trait for Tae.

== Filmography ==
=== Anime ===
Year	Title	Role	Notes
2017	BanG Dream!	Tae Hanazono	
2018	BanG Dream! Girls Band Party! Pico	Tae Hanazono	
2019	BanG Dream! 2nd Season	Tae Hanazono	
2019	BanG Dream! Film Live	Tae Hanazono	Movie
2019	Future Card Buddyfight Ace	Maria Itake	
2020	BanG Dream! 3rd Season	Tae Hanazono	
2020	BanG Dream! Girls Band Party! Pico: Ohmori	Tae Hanazono	
2020	ReBirth for You	Juri Torigoe	
2020	D4DJ First Mix	Nagisa Tsukimiyama	
2021	BanG Dream! Episode of Roselia I: Promise	Tae Hanazono	Movie
2021	BanG Dream! Film Live 2nd Stage	Tae Hanazono	Movie
2021	BanG Dream! Girls Band Party! Pico Fever!	Tae Hanazono	
2021	Remake Our Life!	Yurika Hiyama	
2022	BanG Dream! Poppin'Dream!	Tae Hanazono	Movie

=== Video games ===
Year	Title	Role	Notes
2017–present	BanG Dream! Girls Band Party!	Tae Hanazono	
2017	Megami Meguri	Sotoorihime	
2020–2024	D4DJ Groovy Mix	Nagisa Tsukimiyama	
