= The Fruit of Evolution =

Japanese light novel series and its adaptations

- The Fruit of Evolution: Before I Knew It, My Life Had It Made
- First light novel volume cover, featuring Seiichi Hiiragi (left) and Saria (right)

進化の実 ～知らないうちに勝ち組人生～ (Shinka no Mi: Shiranai Uchi ni Kachigumi Jinsei)
- Genre: Isekai, fantasy
- Novel series
- Written by: Miku
- Published by: Shōsetsuka ni Narō
- Original run: January 2014 – present
- Light novel
- Written by: Miku
- Illustrated by: U35
- Published by: Futabasha
- English publisher: NA: Hanashi Media
- Imprint: Monster Bunko
- Original run: September 30, 2014 – December 28, 2022
- Volumes: 15
- Manga
- Written by: Miku
- Illustrated by: Sorano
- Published by: Futabasha
- Imprint: Monster Comics
- Magazine: Web Comic Action (September 2017–December 2019); Gaugau Monster (December 2019–present)
- Original run: September 2017 – present
- Volumes: 12
- Anime television series
- Directed by: Yoshiaki Okumura (Note: Credited as Chief Director (総監督, Sō Kantoku) for the second season.); Shige Fukase (season 2)
- Produced by: Masaki Ishii; Sakiyo Kubo; Hatsuo Nara; Makoto Nishibe; Kousei Kawamoto (season 1); Fumihiro Ozawa (season 2); Tomoaki Yusa (season 2); Koutarou Nakamura (season 2); Takeomi Sugawara (season 2)
- Written by: Gigaemon Ichikawa
- Music by: Sky Delta; Asuka Ogura; Hideyuki Gushimiyagi; (season 1); Hiroyasu Yano; Alisa Okehazama; Yūki Saitō; (season 2)
- Studio: Hotline (Note: Hotline served as the main production company, with studios Children's Playground Entertainment (CPE) and Feel credited as Production Produce (制作プロデュース) and Production Produce Assistance (制作プロデュース協力), respectively, for season 1. Neither Feel nor CPE are credited for season 2.)
- Licensed by: Crunchyroll (streaming); SA/SEA: Medialink
- Original network: TV Tokyo, BS TV Tokyo, AT-X
- Original run: October 5, 2021 – April 1, 2023
- Episodes: 24
- icon

The Fruit of Evolution: Before I Knew It, My Life Had It Made (進化の実 ～知らないうちに勝ち組人生～, Shinka no Mi: Shiranai Uchi ni Kachigumi Jinsei) is a Japanese fantasy light novel series written by Miku and illustrated by U35 (pronounced "Umiko"). It began serialization online in January 2014 on the user-generated novel publishing website Shōsetsuka ni Narō. It was later acquired by Futabasha, which has published the series since September 2014 under its Monster Bunko imprint. Hanashi Media has licensed the light novel for an English release. A manga adaptation with art by Sorano has been serialized via Futabasha's digital publication Web Comic Action since September 2017, and it moved to the Gaugau Monster website in December 2019. An anime television series adaptation by Hotline aired from October to December 2021. A second season aired from January to March 2023.

== Plot ==
Seiichi Hiiragi is an overweight high school student who is bullied by his classmates for being a "loser". One day, his entire school is suddenly transported to a video game–like world of swords and sorcery. He almost avoided it, thanks to hiding in a niche, but got caught by the God that did it just as it was erasing all evidence the summoned existed. When he unknowingly eats "the Fruit of Evolution," not only does his physical appearance change, but his life as a successful "winner" begins.

As the story progresses, it is shown that while the commoners are good people, the nobles and royalty are all selfish and greedy jerks exploiting the kidnapped otherworldly. The dungeons and their bosses were all created from vengeful victims.

== Characters ==
Seiichi Hiiragi (柊誠一, Hīragi Seiichi)
Voiced by: Hiro Shimono (Japanese); Mark Allen Jr. (English)
A generally good-hearted guy, who was abused non-stop at school for being overweight. After being transported to another world by a mysterious god, he eats 10 fruits of evolution enhancing skills and his body to give him a more conventionally attractive appearance. He can learn how to use his new spells and abilities by simply observing them or reading them in books.
Upon reaching the city of Tillburt, he finds employment as an adventurer at the local guild but after helping defend Tilburt from an army of monsters, he becomes a teacher at Barbador Magical Academy.
Saria (サリア)
Voiced by: Tetsu Inada (before evolution), Kana Hanazawa (after evolution) (Japanese); Comona Lewin (before evolution), Jalitza Delgado (after evolution) (English)
A monster girl belonging to the Kaiser Kong species. She falls in love with Seiichi after witnessing his strength in battle. Much like Seiichi, she eats from fruits of evolution granting her a human appearance. She later gains the ability to switch between her human and Kaiser Kong forms at will. Upon hearing Artoria has fallen in love with Seiichi, Saria comes up with the idea of Seiichi taking both Saria and Artoria as wives, much to his annoyance.
Because of her enormous strength, she requires no weapons and instead uses her fists.
Artoria Gremm (アルトリア・グレム, Arutoria Guremu)
Voiced by: Marina Inoue (Japanese); Corey Pettit (English)
A veteran member of Tillburt's local adventurers' guild. Artoria was born with negative 2 million luck, making her a disaster and was referred as the Calamity so she worked solo as an adventurer, and chase off any friends to keep them safe. Seiichi gifts her a magic ring causes her luck to double into a positive 4 million. Unaware he put it on a proposal finger, she decides to start out as his girlfriend.
In battle, she wields the double-handed Grand-Axe, which can increase her attack power 4 times. Previously, she could channel her bad luck to increase her physical condition, entering as state called "Calamity Berserker". However, it is unknown if she can still use "Calamity Berserker" now her bad luck has been nullified. After receiving additional training from the Valkyries, she learns how to use ice magic.
Lulune (ルルネ, Rurune)
Voiced by: Rimi Nishimoto (Japanese); Monét Lerner (English)
A female donkey Seiichi accidentally evolved into a human by feeding her a fruit of evolution during a race. She has an enormous appetite and will eat huge amounts of food.
Oliga Calmeria (オリガ・カルメリア, Origa Karumeria)
Voiced by: Yurika Kubo (Japanese); Reshel Mae (English)
A catgirl captured by the Kaiser empire and forced to work as an assassin. She attempts to assassinate King Ranze of Wimburg before being captured by Seiichi, who frees her from slavery and adopts her as a little sister.
Karen Kannazuki (神無月華蓮, Kannazuki Karen)
Voiced by: Yoshino Nanjō (Japanese); Erica Muse (English)
The student council president for Seiichi's school. She is one of the very few people who did not tease or bully him. Along with most of her classmates, she is recruited into becoming a soldier for the Kaiser empire, but she remains worried for Seiichi's safety. After being transferred to Barbador Magical Academy, she is disappointed to learn her high achievements with her training had made her unpopular with her fellow students.
Karen was originally tricked into wearing a slavery bracelet to tie her to the kingdom; however, after Seiichi frees her, Karen has him "enslave" her with it so she can be his spy.
Louise Balze (ルイエス・バルゼ, Ruiesu Baruze)
Voiced by: Yoko Hikasa (Japanese); Kimberly Grace (English)
Known as the "Knight of Swords", Louise is the leader of the Valkyries, Wimburg's most prestigious military unit. Since childhood, she has been a prodigy at sword fighting and, despite her low aptitude for magic, she became captain of the Valkyries at a young age. Upon meeting Seiichi, she challenges him to a sparring session, which he wins; not getting she was supposed to have a date with him, as prize for a contest. Impressed by his skills, she asks him to become his apprentice, to which he reluctantly accepts.
She is also the sister of Florio Balze, the leader of Wimburg's magical division. She wields a magical weapon called the "Water God's Rapier", which she can use to channel her water magic to perform slashing attacks.
Guscle Clute (ガッスル・クルート, Gassuru Kurūto)
Voiced by: Tetsu Inada (Japanese); Anthony DiMascio, Cyrus Rodas (episode 13 onwards) (English)
Guscle is the guildmaster of Telbert Adventure Guild. He loves wearing boomerang pants. He has a big voice and a big body, and is a real brainiac, he's also a masochist and doesn't try to hide it. His trademark is his muscle pose.

Seiichi has a low opinion of Guscle, on average, since the guild master can't keep the perverts in the guild in line.
Eris McClain (エリス・マクレーヌ, Erisu Makurēnu)
Voiced by: Yūka Nishio (Japanese); Giovannie Cruz (English)
Eris works as a receptionist in the Telbert adventure guild. She was also an ex-S class adventurer. She usually wears receptionist clothes while doing guild related work, and while showing her sadistic side she has a black whip and mask while wearing a blank skin-tight jumpsuit.
Mr. Sheep (羊さん, Hitsuji-san)
Voiced by: Satomi Arai (Japanese); Rachel Glass (English)
A world guide of sorts, whom enjoys tormenting Seiichi with exploding notes. He will appear after dungeons are cleared to congratulate Seiichi.
Airi Seto (世渡愛梨, Seto Airi)
Voiced by: Yumiri Hanamori
A Japanese student who was also teleported into Barbador Magical Academy, alongside Karen. She is another childhood friend of Seiichi. She was a loner at school during junior high. Then she met Seiichi. Seiichi encouraged her that she is so cute. If she gets dressed up and speaks to everyone, she would make more friends. Every day she and he will eat lunch on the rooftop. She started to develop feelings for him. After then she got more friends. Seiichi stopped coming to the rooftop because he thought that her reputation will be damaged if he continued to be her friend.
Xeanos, the Noble of the Darkness (暗黒貴族ゼアノス, Ankoku Kizoku Zeanōsu)
Voiced by: Satoshi Hino (Japanese); Major Attaway (English)
An undead skeletal monster of the "Dark Lord" class. He was formerly a human noble in love with his maid Marie, until he was betrayed by his own emperor and forced to flee to Saria's forest. Upon the death of Marie, he lost his humanity and formed a dungeon where could spend eternity alone with Marie's corpse. He is killed by Seiichi, but his soul is released from his curse and he is allowed to reunite with Marie in the afterlife.
Destra (デストラ, Desutora)
Voiced by: Miyuki Sawashiro (Japanese); Veronica Laux (English)
Vitor (ヴィトール, Vitōru)
Voiced by: Tomokazu Sugita
Demiolos (デミオロス, Demiorosu)
Voiced by: Chiharu Sawashiro (Japanese); Tom Laflin (English)
Angurea (アングレア)
Voiced by: Ami Koshimizu (Japanese); Molly Zhang (English)
Beatrice Roegner (ベアトリス・ローグナー, Beatorisu Rōgunā)
Voiced by: Lynn (Japanese); Dani Chambers (English)
Agnos Passion (アグノス・パシオン, Agunosu Pashion)
Voiced by: Minoru Shiraishi (Japanese); Dalton Walker (English)
Agnos is a male student of classroom 7 that has a large pompadour, carries a bat and is very brash in his communication. He truly cares for his fellow classmates and wants to best classroom S. He eventually is able to access fire magic due to Seiichi liberating his body's own magic energy.
Brud Lev Kaiser (ブルード・レフ・カイゼル, Burūdo Refu Kaizeru)
Voiced by: Toshinari Fukamachi (Japanese); Patrick Mealey (English)
Helen Rosa (ヘレン・ローザ, Heren Rōza)
Voiced by: Rui Tanabe (Japanese); Morgan Lea (English)
Baird Lutra (<kanji/kana>, <rōmaji>; <extra>) <extra2>
Theobold Terra Kaiser (テオボルト・テラ・カイゼル, Teoboruto Tera Kaizeru)
Voiced by: Shōya Ishige (Japanese); Cody Savoie (English)
God (神, Kami)
Voiced by: Toshihiko Seki
An unseen entity that teleports Seiichi and his classmates into an alternate universe. Said entity attempted to cover its tracks by erasing all memory of the 800 people it kidnapped from the school; however, this is still suspicious as an empty school and photographs would prove something was off.
It almost missed Seiichi because he wisely hid in the ceiling when God locked all the windows and doors; he only got sent due to falling through right before God left.

== Media ==
=== Light novels ===
The series, written by Miku, began serialization online in January 2014 on the user-generated novel publishing website Shōsetsuka ni Narō. It was later acquired by Futabasha, who have published it as a light novel with illustrations by U35 in fifteen volumes from September 2014 to December 2022 under their Monster Bunko imprint. Hanashi Media has licensed the light novel for an English release.

No.	Original release date	Original ISBN	English release date	English ISBN
1	September 30, 2014	978-4-57-575006-5	August 15, 2022	979-8-98-637090-3
2	January 30, 2015	978-4-57-575022-5	November 25, 2022	979-8-98-637094-1
3	June 30, 2015	978-4-57-575047-8	February 28, 2023	979-8-98-637096-5
4	January 30, 2016	978-4-57-575072-0	May 30, 2023	979-8-98-637098-9
5	August 30, 2016	978-4-57-575103-1	July 30, 2023	979-8-98-637099-6
6	May 30, 2017	978-4-57-575140-6	September 29, 2023	978-1-96-178804-6
7	December 28, 2017	978-4-57-575180-2	November 29, 2023	978-1-96-178806-0
8	September 29, 2018	978-4-57-575222-9	January 29, 2024	978-1-96-178807-7
9	April 30, 2019	978-4-57-575242-7	April 30, 2024	978-1-96-178812-1
10	December 28, 2019	978-4-57-575259-5	October 30, 2024	978-1-96-178824-4
11	July 30, 2020	978-4-57-575272-4	December 30, 2025	978-1-96-178845-9
12	February 27, 2021	978-4-57-575284-7	March 30, 2026	978-1-96-178848-0
13	September 30, 2021	978-4-57-575297-7	June 30, 2026	978-1-96-178866-4
14	March 30, 2022	978-4-57-575304-2	September 30, 2026	978-1-96-178883-1
15	December 28, 2022	978-4-57-575318-9	November 30, 2026	979-8-95-313605-1

=== Manga ===
A manga adaptation with art by Sorano has been serialized via Futabasha's digital publication Web Comic Action since September 2017, and it moved to the Gaugau Monster website in December 2019. It has been collected in twelve tankōbon volumes.

No.	Japanese release date	Japanese ISBN
1	February 28, 2018	978-4-57-541021-1
2	October 31, 2018	978-4-57-541034-1
3	August 30, 2019	978-4-57-541066-2
4	January 30, 2020	978-4-57-541097-6
5	July 30, 2020	978-4-57-541140-9
6	January 30, 2021	978-4-57-541202-4
7	September 30, 2021	978-4-57-541302-1
8	September 15, 2022	978-4-57-541418-9
9	March 15, 2023	978-4-57-541611-4
10	October 30, 2023	978-4-57-541734-0
11	June 28, 2024	978-4-57-541917-7
12	January 30, 2026	978-4-57-542337-2

=== Anime ===
An anime television series adaptation was announced on January 28, 2021. The series was animated by Hotline (with Feel and Children's Playground Entertainment in co-production), with Yoshiaki Okumura directing the series, Gigaemon Ichikawa overseeing the scripts, Minami Eda designing the characters, and Hifumi, Inc. composing the series' music. It aired from October 5 to December 21, 2021, on TV Tokyo, BS-TV Tokyo, and AT-X. (Note: TV Tokyo listed the series premiere at 26:00 on October 4, 2021, which is effectively 2:00 a.m. JST on October 5.) Yoshino Nanjō performed the opening theme "Evolution:", while Poppin'Party performed the ending theme "Moonlight Walk". Crunchyroll streamed the series outside of Asia. Medialink licensed the series in Asia-Pacific. Crunchyroll began streaming an English dub on May 5, 2022.

On April 1, 2022, it was announced that the series would be receiving a second season. The second season is directed by Shige Fukase, with Yoshiaki Okumura serving as chief director, Iroha Mizuki and Nobuhide Hayashi designing the characters, and Hiroyasu Yano, Alisa Okehazama and Yūki Saitō composing the music. It aired from January 14 to April 1, 2023. The opening theme is "Evolution" by Nano, while the ending theme is "Adore Me" by Erii Yamazaki.

==== Series overview ====
Season	Episodes	Originally released	
Season	Episodes	First released	Last released
1	12	October 5, 2021	December 21, 2021
2	12	January 14, 2023	April 1, 2023

==== Season 1 ====
No. overall	No. in season	Title (Note: All English titles are taken from Crunchyroll.)	Directed by (Note: Information is taken from the ending credits of each episode.)	Written by	Storyboarded by	Original release date
1	1	"Before I Knew It, I Was Living in Another World!"; Transliteration: "Shiranai Uchi ni Isekai Jinsei!" (Japanese: 知らないうちに異世界人生!)	Yoshiaki Okumura	Gigaemon Ichikawa	Yoshiaki Okumura	October 5, 2021
Japanese teenager Seiichi Hiiragi endures a difficult life in high school due to his unattractive appearance. Suddenly, his entire class receives a message by a mysterious God, who suddenly teleports Seiichi and his classmates to another world. Seiichi is separated from his classmates and emerges in a forest, where he is forced to learn how to survive on his own for 5 months. In that time, he comes across mysterious fruits that enhance his body and give him a more conventionally attractive appearance. After gaining enough experience in combat, hunting and use of magic, Seiichi is attacked by a Saria, a gorilla-like female monster who has fallen in love with him after witnessing his strength in battle. Seiichi survives a battle with Saria, convincing her to take Seiichi as her mate.
2	2	"Final Evolution! Naked Beauty"; Transliteration: "Saishū Shinka! Hadaka no Bijo" (Japanese: 最終進化！裸の美女)	Nana Fujiwara	Gigaemon Ichikawa	Yoshiaki Okumura	October 12, 2021
Seiichi grows increasingly uncomfortable around Saria and attempts to escape by entering a cave she had previously warned him about. Unfortunately, Seiichi is attacked by the cave's sole inhabitant, the Dark Lord Xeanos, and Saria saves him but she is left grievously wounded. Enraged, Seiichi kills Xeanos in battle, inadvertently releasing him from his curse of undeath and allowing to depart into the afterlife. Seiichi and Saria undergo their final evolutions, with Seiichi obtaining more magical power and Saria becoming human. They also learn the tragic history of Xeanos and receive a visit from Mr. Sheep, the administrator of Xeanos' dungeon. Mr. Sheep gifts Seiichi and Saria with travelling funds and a kit that could help them harvest more fruits of evolution. After leaving the forest, Seiichi and Saria decide to travel together. Meanwhile, Seiichi's classmates have been declared heroes by the king and have started training. However, some of the students aren't happy with the training sessions and want to see actual combat, much to the displeasure of Karen Kannazuki, one of the few people in the class who genuinely cared for Seiichi.
3	3	"Artoria, The Calamity"; Transliteration: "Saiyaku no Arutoria" (Japanese: 災厄のアルトリア)	Takashi Asami	Shinji Satō	Takashi Asami	October 19, 2021
Seiichi and Saria reach Tillburt, royal capital of Wimburg, hoping to join the local adventurer's guild and gain official IDs. Although Seiichi is unnerved by the members' fetishes, he still gains membership for himself and Saria. To become official members, they must undertake minor jobs supervised by a veteran guildmate, Artoria Gremm. While Saria looks after some children in a church, Seiichi is tasked with helping with the demolition of a local building and walking a noblewoman's dog. With their tasks completed, Seiichi and Saria are officially welcomed into the guild.
4	4	"Black Dragon God's Dungeon"; Transliteration: "Koku Ryūshin no Meikyū" (Japanese: 黒龍神の迷宮)	Ryōhei Endō	Seiichirō Mochizuki	Michi Kage	October 26, 2021
Seiichi and Saria continue their tests under Artoria's supervision, until Seiichi comes across a trio of demons setting up teleportation portals leading to the dungeon inhabited by the Black Dragon God. The next day, as Seiichi and Saria begin their final test, they (alongside Artoria) are teleported into the dungeon, which contains a massive labyrinth. Artoria steps on a stone that causes a huge wall that separates her from Seiichi and Saria, forcing her to find a way to meet up with them. She reaches the lowest part of the dungeon, where she faces off against the Black Dragon God, who almost kills her until Seiichi and Saria arrive just in time to save her.
5	5	"The Calamity Bride"; Transliteration: "Saiyaku no Hanayome" (Japanese: 災厄の花嫁)	Yoshihide Kuriyama	Gigaemon Ichikawa	Ichizō Kobayashi	November 2, 2021
Seiichi slays the Black Dragon God and acquires the power of spatial magic, which he uses to take his friends back to the guild. Artoria is shocked that Seiichi would risk his life to save her and feels guilty for putting him in danger. She tells him the story of how she became known as the "Calamity": she was born with 2 million points of bad luck, causing her to bring misfortune to everyone she came across. Fortunately, Seiichi gives her a special ring he found back at the dungeon. Although the ring nullifies her curse, Artoria thinks Seiichi just proposed to her and she runs away in embarrassment. Meanwhile, news of the Black Dragon God's death reach the remaining leaders of the Demon Lord's army, causing them to worry that someone is trying to restart the war between humans and demons.
6	6	"Crying Out Love in the Center of Another World"; Transliteration: "Isekai no Chūshin de Ai o Sakebu" (Japanese: 異世界の中心で愛を叫ぶ)	Takashi Asami	Seiichirō Mochizuki	Takashi Asami	November 9, 2021
Following the advice of Guscle and Eris, Seiichi goes to the royal library of Tillburt, hoping to find information about his classmates. When that fails, he attempts to read books about magic and accidentally increases his magic power. He later goes to a nearby cafe for a meal and starts a conversation with the manager Noard and a commoner known simply as Ranze. He admits he feels guilty that he just put Artoria in an uncomfortable position, so Noard and Ranze advise him to be honest with Artoria and set things right with her. Meanwhile, Artoria gets advised by her friend Adriana to admit her feelings for Seiichi. Upon meeting yet again, Artoria admits she is in love with Seiichi, even though he is already in love with Saria, who agrees to share Seiichi with Artoria, a decision met with unanimous approval from their friends.
7	7	"Lulune Appears!"; Transliteration: "Rurune Tōjō!" (Japanese: ルルネ登場！)	Yoshiaki Okumura	Shinji Satō	Yoshiaki Okumura	November 16, 2021
Seiichi has become an A-rank adventurer and, on the advice of Guscle, decides to buy a horse. On the stables, he finds a temperamental female donkey named Lulune and agrees to buy her. After buying food for Lulune, Seiichi finds a young artist named May, who is having a discussion with her friend Clay about entering the royal art competition, celebrated a month after the royal race. May feels unsure whether she should enter the tournament, so Seiichi proposes a deal: if he wins at the royal race, May will enter the art competition. She agrees, but on the day of the competition, Lulune feels sick for not eating a proper breakfast before the race. Fortunately, Seiichi feeds her some of his fruits of evolution, allowing her to win first place. After the race, however, Lulune evolves into a human form, thanks to the fruits of evolution Seiichi had given her.
8	8	"Beautiful Valkyrie"; Transliteration: "Warukyūre no Bijo" (Japanese: 剣聖の戦乙女(ワルキューレ)の美女)	Fumio Maezono	Seiichirō Mochizuki	Ichizō Kobayashi	November 23, 2021
As the winner of the royal race, Seiichi is taken to Archel, the royal castle of Wimburg, where he meets Louise Balze, captain of Wimburg's Valkyries. She challenges Seiichi to a training match to test his skills. He wins the match, and she declares herself to be his apprentice. Suddenly, the king of Wimburg is attacked by an assassin and the Valkyries move in to intercept her. Seiichi uses his magic to discover that the assassin is only a child. Meanwhile, Seiichi's classmates are transferred to Barbador Magical Academy and the demon nation's governing council, led by Lutia, the Demon Lord's daughter, agree to negotiate for peace with Wimburg, much to the frustration of Lutia's advisor, Kreis, who is pushing for war against the humans.
9	9	"Black Cat Oliga"; Transliteration: "Kuro Neko no Origa" (Japanese: 黒猫のオリガ)	Hoe Won Kim	Shinji Satō	Ichizō Kobayashi	November 30, 2021
Seiichi intercepts the assassin at the castle's training grounds and easily captures her. He identifies the assassin as Origa Calmeria and leaves her to be interrogated by the Valkyries. However, the king is still left in critical condition due to Origa's curse and Seiichi is only able to save his life by creating his own healing spell. He also discovers the king to be Ranze, the man who advised him earlier on how to solve his romantic problems with Artoria. As a reward, Ranze allows Seiichi to use the castle to practice his fighting and magic skills. Meanwhile, Zakia, the old soldier who mentored Seiichi's classmates in combat, questions the kaiser emperor's decision to send them to Barbador Magical Academy and is horrified to learn that Helio, a mage working for the emperor, placed bracelets on the students to prevent them from becoming a threat to the kingdom. Suddenly, an assassin attempts to kill the king, forcing Zakia to pursue him.
10	10	"Creeping Kaiser Empire"; Transliteration: "Shinobiyoru Kaizeru Teikoku" (Japanese: 忍び寄るカイゼル帝国)	Sumito Sasaki	Seiichirō Mochizuki	Ichizō Kobayashi	December 7, 2021
Seiichi and Louise watch the interrogation of Oliga at the hands of Lorna, one of Louise's Valkyries. They stop the interrogation when they discover that Oliga is wearing a slave collar that forces her to obey the orders of the Kaiser empire and Seiichi is able to release her from the collar by creating his own liberation spell. Louise is forced to investigate the activity of monsters near the borders of Wimburg but asks Seiichi to look after Ranze in her absence. Meanwhile, Zakia confronts the man who tried to assassinate the Kaiser emperor, an archer known as Shien. Disgusted by the death of the demon woman he loved; Shien wanted revenge against the Kaiser empire for its ruthless discrimination against demons. Shien escapes and Zakia is forced to reevaluate his loyalty to the empire.
11	11	"Monsters VS Crazy Guild"; Transliteration: "Mamono Bāsasu Ikashita Girudo" (Japanese: 魔物VSイカしたギルド)	Yoshiaki Okumura	Shinji Satō	Yoshiaki Okumura	December 14, 2021 (Note: This episode aired at 2:10 a.m. JST, 10 minutes after the original air time on TV Tokyo.)
Archel receives a visit from Barnabus, a legendary wizard who served as mentor to Ranze. He informs Ranze about the students who recently transferred to his school, Barbador Magical Academy, causing Seiichi to realize that those new students are his classmates from Japan. Suddenly, a soldier informs Ranze that an army of monsters have begun an attack on Tillburt. Louise and her Valkyries have linked up with an army led by the Black Paladin, Wimburg's finest soldier, to fight monsters at Wimburg's borders, leaving them unable to assist in the defense of Tillburt. Wimburg's remaining soldiers and the local adventurers' guild join forcest to defend Tillburt and succeed in holding the line against the first wave of monsters. Unfortunately, reinforcements for the monster army arrive, leaving the defenders with no means of escape.
12	12	"Before I Knew It, It's the Final Episode!?"; Transliteration: "Shiranai Uchi ni Saishūkai!?" (Japanese: 知らないうちに最終回！？)	Hoe Won Kim	Gigaemon Ichikawa	Ichizō Kobayashi	December 21, 2021
Seiichi creates an offensive spell called "Judgment" that obliterates the enemy army, while leaving the defenders of Tillburt unharmed. Impressed by Seiichi's talent, Barnabus congratulates him for saving the city and offers a teaching position at Barbador, to which Seiichi accepts on the condition of waiting until Louise and her Valkyries return to Tillburt to ensure Ranze's safety. Once Louise returns to Tillburt, Seiichi and his friends depart for Barbador, but promise to return. Meanwhile, Kreis is disappointed to learn that the monster army failed to destroy Tillburt. This failure earns him the anger of the Demon Lord, who was hoping to use the negative emotions unleashed by the destruction of the city to resurrect himself. However, the Demon Lord only considers his failure to be a temporary setback and swears to find another way to regain his power.

==== Season 2 ====
No. overall	No. in season	Title	Directed by	Written by	Storyboarded by	Original release date
13	1	"Welcome to Barbador Magic Academy!"; Transliteration: "Yōkoso! Bābadoru Mahō Gakuen e" (Japanese: ようこそ！バーバドル魔法学園へ)	Shigeru Fukase	Gigaemon Ichikawa	Yoshiaki Okumura	January 14, 2023
The team finally makes the long journey to Barbador Magic Academy. Along the way, Seiichi has a dream of a fight with a young male that impales him and kills Saria. The team is told about their roles: Seiichi and Artoria will be teachers, Saria and Lulune will be students and Oliga will be his secretary. Seiichi is introduced to the old teacher of classroom 7, which he will be taking over for and she has faith in him since Barnabas vouches for his skill. Seiichi is told that his classroom is deemed trouble makers but their teacher says that they are good students but misunderstood. Classroom 7 has four students along with Saria joining the class.
14	2	"Being a Teacher Is Tough!"; Transliteration: "Kyōshi wa Tsurai yo" (Japanese: 教師はつらいよ)	Yūki Umino	Gigaemon Ichikawa	Yoshiaki Okumura	January 21, 2023
Seiichi gets to meet his new students of classroom 7. They include a brash male student with a pompadour, a reserved male student with blonde hair that is the younger son of the king of the Kaiser empire, a tsundere with matching daggers, and a male student that is silent and wears a bear head mask. Their old teacher suggests a practical exam so Seiichi can assess each student's strengths. He lets the class know that he will not use any magic in the duels he has with each student. The only female of the group takes offense to this and challenges Seiichi first as she says this is to test his strength and not theirs.
15	3	"Seiichi VS Class F"; Transliteration: "Seiichi VS. F Kurasu" (Japanese: 誠一 VS. Fクラス)	Ryū Yano	Shinji Satō	Yoshiaki Okumura	January 28, 2023
16	4	"Reunited With Kannazuki Karen"; Transliteration: "Saikai, Kannadzuki Karen" (Japanese: 再会、神無月華蓮)	Ryō Ōkubo	Seiichirō Mochizuki	Ichizō Kobayashi	February 4, 2023
17	5	"Apostles Attack"; Transliteration: "Shito, Raishū" (Japanese: 使徒、来襲)	Tatsuya Sasaki	Gigaemon Ichikawa	Minoru Ōhara	February 11, 2023
18	6	"Battle for Barbador Magic Academy"; Transliteration: "Kessen! Bābadōru Mahō Gakuen" (Japanese: 決戦！バーバドル魔法学園)	Oyunam	Gigaemon Ichikawa	Akihiro Izumi, Ryū Yajima	February 18, 2023
19	7	"Seiichi Dies"; Transliteration: "Seiichi, Shisu" (Japanese: 誠一、死す)	Ryū Yano	Shinji Satō	Ichizō Kobayashi	February 25, 2023
20	8	"The Four Leaders Closing In"; Transliteration: "Shinobiyoru Shiten'nō" (Japanese: 忍び寄る四天王)	Ryū Yajima	Seiichirō Mochizuki	Minoru Ōhara, Ryū Yajima	March 4, 2023
21	9	"Gempel the Doppelganger"; Transliteration: "Kagamihen no Genperu" (Japanese: 鏡変のゲンペル)	Ryū Yajima, Takatori Seiya	Gigaemon Ichikawa	Ichizō Kobayashi	March 11, 2023
22	10	"Victor the Resonance"; Transliteration: "Kyōmei no Vitōru" (Japanese: 共鳴のヴィトール)	Yoshiaki Okumura, Oyunam	Shinji Satō	Shōhei Yamanaka, Akihiro Izumi, Ryū Yajima	March 18, 2023 (Note: This episode aired at 1:33 a.m. JST, 10 minutes after the original air time on TV Tokyo.)
23	11	"Destra the Absolute Death"; Transliteration: "Zesshi no Desutora" (Japanese: 絶死のデストラ)	Ryō Ōkubo, Takatori Seiya	Seiichirō Mochizuki	Minoru Ōhara	March 25, 2023
24	12	"The True Fruit of Evolution"; Transliteration: "Shin・Shinka no Mi" (Japanese: 真・進化の実)	Oyunam, Ryū Yajima, Takatori Seiya	Gigaemon Ichikawa	Ichizō Kobayashi	April 1, 2023

== See also ==
- I Got a Cheat Skill in Another World and Became Unrivaled in the Real World, Too – Another light novel series by the same author
  - I Got a Cheat Skill in Another World and Became Unrivaled in the Real World, Too: Girls Side – A spin-off of this series
