= Remake Our Life! =

Japanese light novel series

- First light novel volume cover

ぼくたちのリメイク (Bokutachi no Rimeiku)
- Light novel
- Written by: Nachi Kio
- Illustrated by: Eretto
- Published by: Media Factory
- Imprint: MF Bunko J
- Original run: March 25, 2017 – March 25, 2023
- Volumes: 12
- Manga
- Written by: Nachi Kio
- Illustrated by: Bonjin Hirameki
- Published by: Kodansha
- English publisher: US: Kodansha
- Magazine: Suiyōbi no Sirius (November 2018 – September 2019); Magazine Pocket (September 2019 – April 2022)
- Original run: November 23, 2018 – April 4, 2022
- Volumes: 7
- Light novel

Bokutachi no Remake Ver.β
- Written by: Nachi Kio
- Illustrated by: Eretto
- Published by: Media Factory
- Imprint: MF Bunko J
- Original run: August 24, 2019 – present
- Volumes: 3
- Anime television series
- Directed by: Tomoki Kobayashi
- Produced by: Yasuhiro Atobe; Mikito Kyo; Takuya Matsumoto; Yuusuke Oonuki; Hideyuki Yoshimura
- Written by: Nachi Kio
- Music by: Seima Kondo; Yusuke Takeda
- Studio: Feel
- Licensed by: Crunchyroll (streaming); SA/SEA: Medialink
- Original network: Tokyo MX, BS Kyoto, BS NTV, SUN, HTB, SBS, AT-X
- English network: SEA: Animax Asia
- Original run: July 3, 2021 – September 25, 2021
- Episodes: 12
- icon

Remake Our Life! (Japanese: ぼくたちのリメイク, Hepburn: Bokutachi no Rimeiku) or Bokurema is a Japanese light novel series written by Nachi Kio and illustrated by Eretto. Media Factory have published twelve volumes and three spin-off volumes since March 2017 under their MF Bunko J imprint. A manga adaptation with art by Bonjin Hirameki was serialized via Kodansha's Niconico-based Suiyōbi no Sirius manga service from November 2018 to September 2019, before transferring to Magazine Pocket and being serialized from September 2019 to April 2022. It has been collected in seven tankōbon volumes. An anime television series adaptation by Feel aired from July to September 2021.

== Premise ==
Hashiba Kyouya is an aspiring game developer but things did not go well for him. His company went bankrupt, he lost his job and is left with the sole option of returning to his hometown. Looking at other successful creators of his age, he finds himself regretting his life decisions as he lay distressed on his bed. As Kyouya wakes up, he discovers that he has traveled ten years back to the time before he entered college.

== Characters ==
=== Main ===
Kyouya Hashiba (橋場 恭也, Hashiba Kyōya)
Voiced by: Masahiro Itō (Japanese); Jerry Jewell (English)
Kyouya is a 28-year-old unemployed man from Nara Prefecture who quit his salaryman job only to lose his dream job at a bishōjo games developer after it went bankrupt. A fortunate encounter with Eiko Kawasegawa gave him another opportunity to participate in a big game project, though it, unfortunately, gets canceled as well. He then somehow time leaped 10 years into the past, to the moment where he just passed the Ōnaka University of Arts entrance exam. He decided to remake his life so he can be a better game creator. He is currently living in Share House Kitayama along with Aki Shino, Nanako Kogure, and Tsurayuki Rokuonji.
Aki Shino (志野 亜貴, Shino Aki)
Voiced by: Aoi Koga (Japanese); Lindsay Seidel (English)
A resident of Share House Kitayama, Shino is a girl who came from Itoshima, Fukuoka. She is nicknamed "Shinoaki" by the share house residents despite it being a masculine name. She has a petite figure, big breasts, and sometimes a calm and motherly temperament. In the present time, she is Shino Akishima (秋島シノ, Akishima Shino), a famous illustrator whom Kyouya adored. In one of the timelines, she is married to Kyouya and they have a daughter together.
Nanako Kogure (小暮 奈々子, Kogure Nanako)
Voiced by: Aimi (Japanese); Macy Anne Johnson (English)
A resident of Share House Kitayama, Nanako is a girl who has the appearance of a gyaru, but is actually an innocent girl who came from Shiga Prefecture. In the present time, she is an active popular singer with the stage name N@NA. She develops feelings for Kyouya. In the timeline where Kyouya and Aki married, she considers ending her singing career due to a lack of success, but is inspired to continue after remembering him.
Tsurayuki Rokuonji (鹿苑寺 貫之, Rokuonji Tsurayuki)
Voiced by: Haruki Ishiya (Japanese); Kamen Casey (English)
A resident of Share House Kitayama. Despite how he acts, he is actually talented at scenario writing. In the present time, he is known as a popular light novel writer under the pen name Kyouichi Kawagoe (川越京一, Kawagoe Kyōichi). In the timeline where Kyouya and Aki married, he decides not to pursue a writing career.
Eiko Kawasegawa (河瀬川 英子, Kawasegawa Eiko)
Voiced by: Nao Tōyama (Japanese); Marisa Duran (English)
A student at Ōnaka University of Arts whom Kyouya meets in the present time as the leader of a game project planner.

=== Others ===
Misaki Kanō (加納 美早紀, Kanō Misaki)
Voiced by: Miyuki Sawashiro (Japanese); Caitlin Glass (English)
A professor at the Ōnaka University of Arts. She is Eiko's older sister.
Genkirō Hikawa (火川 元気郎, Hikawa Genkirō)
Voiced by: Hidenori Takahashi (Japanese); Jordan Dash Cruz (English)
Takashi Kiryū (桐生 孝史, Kiryū Takashi)
Voiced by: Atsushi Tamaru (Japanese); Mark Allen Jr. (English)
Yurika Hiyama (樋山 友梨佳, Hiyama Yurika)
Voiced by: Sae Ōtsuka
Mikio Sugimoto (杉本 ミキオ, Sugimoto Mikio)
Voiced by: Fukushi Ochiai (Japanese); Ben Phillips (English)
Shō Kakihara (柿原 将, Kakihara Shō)
Voiced by: Yoshiki Nakajima (Japanese); Travis Mullenix (English)
Miyoko Hashiba (橋場 美世子, Hashiba Miyoko)
Voiced by: Hazuki Tanda (Japanese); Emily Fajardo (English)
Kyouya's sister.
Ayaka Minori (御法 彩花, Minori Ayaka)
Voiced by: Rie Takahashi (Japanese); Kristen McGuire (English)
A popular illustrator. Her real name is Minori Saikawa (斎川 美乃梨, Saikawa Minori) and she is actually a student at the same university as Kyouya and the others.

== Media ==
=== Light novels ===
The series ended with the release of its 12th volume in 2023.

==== Remake Our Life! ====
No.	Title	Japanese release date	Japanese ISBN
1	Let's Go Back Ten Years And Become A Creator! Jūnenmae ni Modotte Kurieitā ni Narou! (十年前に戻ってクリエイターになろう！)	March 25, 2017	978-4-04-069142-8
2	Let's Go Back Ten Years And Find Something That Makes You Serious! Jūnenmae ni Modotte Honki ni Nareru Mono o Mitsukeyou! (十年前に戻って本気になれるものを見つけよう！)	July 25, 2017	978-4-04-069339-2
3	End of the Common Route Notice; Kyōtsū Rūto Shūryō nō Shirase (共通ルート終了のお知らせ)	November 25, 2017	978-4-04-069553-2
4	"Welcome" "Itte Rasshai" (「いってらっしゃい」)	April 25, 2018	978-4-04-069853-3
5	What We Lack of Bokutachi ni Tarinaimono (ぼくたちに足りないもの)	September 25, 2018	978-4-04-065162-0
6	Our Upload Date: September the First; Appurōdo-bi: 9 Tsuki 1-nichi (アップロード日：9月1日)	March 25, 2019	978-4-04-065632-8
7	Making things Mono o Tsukuru to iu Koto (ものをつくるということ)	December 25, 2019	978-4-04-064262-8
8	Kyōya Hashiba; Hashiba Kyōya (橋場恭也)	November 25, 2020	978-4-04-680014-5
9	Kaibutsu no Hajimari (怪物のはじまり)	July 21, 2021	978-4-04-680608-6
10	End Roll; Endorōru (エンドロール)	February 25, 2022	978-4-04-680997-1
11	Mudana Koto Nanka Hitotsu Datte (無駄なことなんかひとつだって)	September 22, 2022	978-4-04-681659-7
12	Welcome Back; Okaerinasai (おかえりなさい)	March 25, 2023	978-4-04-682323-6

==== Bokutachi no Remake β ====
A spin-off series first released on August 24, 2019. It is an alternative story of Kyouya who has never returned to 10 years in the past, and instead once again struggling his way out in the game industry together with Eiko Kawasegawa.

No.	Japanese release date	Japanese ISBN
1	August 24, 2019	978-4-04-065920-6
2	June 25, 2020	978-4-04-064728-9
3	April 24, 2021	978-4-04-680393-1

=== Manga ===
A manga adaptation illustrated by Bonjin Hirameki was serialized in Kodansha's Suiyōbi no Sirius service on the Niconico website from November 2018 to September 2019, it was later transferred to the Magazine Pocket website where it ran from September 2019 to April 2022. It has been collected in seven tankōbon volumes with the last in May 2022.

Kodansha published the series in English on their K Manga service.

No.	Japanese release date	Japanese ISBN
1	April 9, 2019	978-4-06-515175-4
2	September 9, 2019	978-4-06-516858-5
3	June 25, 2020	978-4-06-519727-1
4	November 25, 2020	978-4-06-521411-4
5	July 8, 2021	978-4-06-522970-5
6	October 10, 2021	978-4-06-522970-5
7	May 9, 2022	978-4-06-527856-7

=== Anime ===
An anime adaptation was announced on December 20, 2019, which was revealed to be a television series on November 25, 2020. The series is animated by Feel and directed by Tomoki Kobayashi, with Nachi Kio handling the series' scripts, Kōsuke Kawamura designing the characters, and Frontwing producing the series. Seima Kondo and Yusuke Takeda are composing the series' music. It aired from July 3 to September 25, 2021, on Tokyo MX and other channels. Poppin'Party performed the series' opening theme song "Koko kara Saki wa Uta ni Naranai" (ここから先は歌にならない; lit. "Starting From Now, It Won't Become a Song"), while Argonavis performed the series' ending theme song "Kanōsei" (可能性; "Possibility"). Crunchyroll streamed the series worldwide outside of Asia. The series has been dubbed into English, which premiered on August 3, 2022, and was produced in Coppell, Texas. Medialink licensed the series for both South Asia and Southeast Asia territories, and is streaming on its Ani-One YouTube channel and iQIYI. The company also licensed the anime to Animax Asia for TV releases in TV releases.

==== Episode list ====
No.	Title	Directed by (Note: Information is taken from the ending credits of each episode.)	Written by	Storyboarded by	Original release date (Note: Episodes are airing online every Saturday at 9:30 p.m. JST on AbemaTV, 30 minutes before the original air time on Tokyo MX.)
1	"Nothing Was Working Out"; Transliteration: "Nanimokamo Dame ni Natte" (Japanese: なにもかもダメになって)	Shōta Imai; Shōhei Yamanaka	Nachi Kio	Tomoki Kobayashi	July 3, 2021
Twenty-eight-year-old Kyoya Hashiba returns to his parents' home in Nara after getting laid off by the video game company SucceedSoft and reflects on his past ten years of living with regret while thinking about the works done by the prestigious circle called the Platinum Generation, whose members are about his age. He recalls his decision to attend a regular university instead of an arts college and his time as an intern at SucceedSoft, working under his boss Eiko Kawasegawa. Kyoya was a standout employee and was set to work with the Platinum Generation on an ambitious project. However, one day the project was cancelled, and the team that worked on it was laid off. Kyoya goes to sleep, and after waking up, he finds himself ten years in the past, right after graduating from high school in the year 2006. This time, Kyoya decides to attend the arts college. After moving into the Share House Kitayama, he immediately falls asleep, and when he wakes up, he finds Aki Shino sleeping next to him. Afterward, the other residents, Nanako Kogure and Tsurayuki Rokuonji come by, and everybody introduces themselves. The four head out to the welcoming ceremony, where Professor Misaki Kano warns the students that the chances of having a career in the field they came to the college to pursue are meager, and Kyoya meets up with his would-be boss, Eiko. Two weeks later after getting to know his classmates better, Kyoya attends the mixer and learns more about Aki. After returning home from the mixer, Kyoya figures out that he is living with the people who would go on to be the members of the Platinum Generation.
2	"Ten Years Back in Time"; Transliteration: "Jū-nen Mae ni Modotte Kite" (Japanese: 10年前に戻ってきて)	Tatsuya Sasaki	Nachi Kio	Tomoki Kobayashi	July 10, 2021
Kano assigns the students to create a three-minute short with time as the theme. After the lecture, Kyoya and Nanako begin working part-time at the same convenience store while discussing ideas for their short. Using an idea Tsurayuki would go on to use in the future, Kyoya proposes that the four film at the train station. Having had that same idea locked away, Tsurayuki asks about how Kyoya came up with the idea in private, but Tsurayuki dismisses it as purely coincidence. After working on the project, Kyoya notices that the short exceeds the allotted time limit, and cuts need to be made, to which Tsurayuki reluctantly agrees. The four are recruited to join the Fine Arts Study Club, and Aki and Nanako agree to join on a trial basis despite Kyoya's objection. Kyoya reviews the script with Kano, and she tells him to be more audience-focused and relays the feedback to Tsurayuki as they modify the script together. On the day of the shooting, Aki discovers that Tsurayuki borrowed a standard camera instead of a video camera. With no time to return it and get the right camera, Kyoya comes up with an idea.
3	"Just Who Am I?"; Transliteration: "Boku wa Nanimono Nan Darōtte" (Japanese: ぼくは何者なんだろうって)	Chihaya Tanaka	Takayo Ikami	Tomoki Kobayashi	July 17, 2021
Kyoya's improvised idea is to use a series of camera stills shot at the station and then tell a narrative using Kyoya's editing expertise to craft a proper story. Team Kitayama's short was well-received at the screening, finishing third - with Eiko's team taking first. Afterward, Eiko asks Kano why Kitayama's short did not finish first, and it is revealed that Kano is an accomplished filmmaker and Eiko is her younger sister. Sometime later, Nanako takes Kyoya to a karaoke parlor, where Kyoya learns about Nanako's musical background that came from her grandmother. Nanako then asks Kyoya to continue listening to her singing, giving him the idea to upload her singing online. Team Kitayama then has a party with the fine arts club. Afterward, as Kyoya and Aki walk home, Kyoya inspires Aki to do her best by praising her artwork.
4	"Consider What You Can Do"; Transliteration: "Dekiru Koto o Kangaete" (Japanese: できることを考えて)	Shin'ichi Tatsuta	Nachi Kio	Katsuyuki Kodera	July 24, 2021
Team Kitayama completes their summer break assignment with a movie filmed on the beach with assistance from Eiko and the fine arts club. While working on one of his part-time jobs with Eiko, Kyoya meets up with Keiko Tomioka, an alum who is the leader of the popular doujin circle, Hallucigenia Soft. The films are screened to start the next semester. Despite the professional-level acting in the last film shown, Kitayama's film takes first place due to the superior technical aspects beyond the acting, as Kano explains to Nanako. Kitayama and the fine arts club celebrate at a karaoke parlor. When Nanako is asked to sing, Eiko questions her commitment to becoming a singer causing Nanako to walk out dejected. The next day, Kyoya rejects Eiko's request for resignation from the team as she apologizes to Kyoya for her behavior that resulted from jealousy and asks him to reconcile with Nanako. In the club room, Keiko drops by to ask Kyoya to work for her but declines. That night back at the share house, Kyoya plays a recording of Nanako's songs and reveals that she has trouble getting the right pitch as he convinces her to continue her pursuit of a singing career.
5	"Reveal Your Feelings"; Transliteration: "Jibun no Omoi o Uchiakete" (Japanese: 自分の思いを打ちあけて)	Taichi Yoshizawa; Yoshimichi Hirai	Takayo Ikami	Shōta Imai	July 31, 2021
After much preparation, the university festival begins. Kitayama and the fine arts club put on a maid cafe with Keiko helping out. After spending two days working in the cafe, Kyoya and Aki walk together around the festival. At an art exhibit, Kyoya sees a painting by a familiar artist named Kazu Yamashina and passes out. At the end of the day, Kyoya wakes up with Aki, and as the two are about to kiss when Kyoya gets a call from Tsurayuki. Due to the planned secret guest having a scheduling conflict, Kyoya is tasked with finding a replacement singer as the concert's secret guest and asks Nanako to fill the role. Nanako runs away, not confident in her singing, but Kyoya convinces her by presenting this as an opportunity. After the concert, Kyoya and Aki kiss each other, with Nanako watching them unbeknownst to them.
6	"We'll Figure It Out"; Transliteration: "Nantoka Shiyōtte" (Japanese: なんとかしようって)	Shin'ichi Tatsuta	Nachi Kio	Minoru Ōhara	August 7, 2021
For several days after the festival, Tsurayuki has been skipping classes and working almost nonstop at his part-time jobs, causing the share house residents to be concerned. After collapsing and resting up at a doctor's clinic, Tsurayuki privately explains his situation to Kyoya, revealing that he comes from a family with a long line of doctors and, wanting a career in script writing instead of being a doctor, he ran away from home and worked several jobs to pay for his tuition. After hearing this, Kyoya decides to create and sell a doujin game through Keiko's circle and use the profits to help pay for Tsurayuki's tuition. Kyoya gets to work recruiting Kazu to do backgrounds while working the share house residents hard, causing their performances in class to slip. Sometime later, Tsurayuki gets a visit from his fiancée and childhood friend Sayuri Jisshoji.
6.5	"Recap"; Transliteration: "Sōshūhen" (Japanese: 総集編)	N/A	N/A	N/A	August 14, 2021
A recap episode covering the events of episodes 1 through 6.
7	"Tackling Awkward Situations"; Transliteration: "Iya na Koto mo Hikiukete" (Japanese: いやなことも引きうけて)	Shūhei Matsushita	Takayo Ikami	Shūhei Matsushita	August 21, 2021
Sayuri treats the share house resident to a hot pot dinner in hopes of convincing Tsurayuki to return home to pursue a career as a doctor and marry her. Work continues on the doujin game, with the share house residents struggling to keep up with the tight production schedule as school goes on winter break. The residents continue working hard through the break, and upon returning to school, Eiko warns Kyoya that his demanding and forceful leadership is starting to wear thin on the team. With the team exhausted after working long hours on the game, Kyoya tells everybody to rest up, putting the game's production significantly behind schedule. Sometime later, Sayuri stops coming to the share house, and she has a private conversation with Kyoya about Tsurayuki's career choice. Kyoya tells her to respect Tsurayuki's decision that he made for himself as Sayuri returns home.
8	"Produce Results"; Transliteration: ""Kekka" o Dashite" (Japanese: 『結果』を出して)	Shōhei Yamanaka	Nachi Kio	Keiichirō Kawaguchi	August 28, 2021
With one month left before the game's launch date and the production behind schedule, Kyoya makes some major alterations to the game to meet the deadline, causing Tsurayuki to get upset about the way the game's script is being produced while compromising Aki's artwork. On the day of the deadline, with just hours to go, Kyoya finds out that the game is filled with bugs, forcing their remaining time to be spent fixing them. After working through the night, the game called HaruSora is completed in time to meet the deadline. The game sells well at the doujinshi convention, and the share house residents celebrate their success afterward. Despite not having to worry about working for his tuition anymore, Tsurayuki decides to drop out of school, realizing he is too dependent on Kyoya to have a fulfilling career. Kyoya is filled with regret again, and after speaking with Keiko, he wakes up 11 years in the future in the year 2018, where he is married to Aki and has a daughter named Maki Hashiba.
9	"Showing Off"; Transliteration: "Misetsukerarete" (Japanese: 見せつけられて)	Shin'ichi Tatsuta	Takayo Ikami	Katsuyuki Kodera	September 4, 2021
Figuring out his situation in this timeline, Kyoya discovers that he is now living in Noborito, working with Eiko for the prolific gaming company Attraction Point, which specializes in free-to-play mobile games after graduating from college. The next day, Kyoya goes to work and meets his co-worker Miki Morishita, who takes him to see Eiko. As progress on their latest game has stalled, Eiko asks Kyoya to check up on the illustrator for the current project, Minori Saikawa. Minori explains that she has hit a mental block, and Kyoya points to her impressive collection of works to motivate her. After getting home from work, Kyoya learns that Aki stopped drawing years ago. The next day, Kyoya learns that Nanako retired from her career as an unsuccessful virtual idol, while Tsurayuki never wrote any novels. After work, Kyoya walks out depressed and returns home dejected. Aki then comforts him and explains that she quit drawing because she stopped having fun getting Kyoya to realize that his rush to get the game out quickly was at the root of the problems.
10	"Learn Lessons"; Transliteration: "Omoishirasarete" (Japanese: 思い知らされて)	Shōta Imai; Taichi Yoshizawa	Takayo Ikami	Minoru Ōhara	September 11, 2021
One month since time leaping into the future, Kyoya is up to speed with his current work situation in this timeline. Meanwhile, Eiko's team struggles to keep up with the tight deadlines the company president has set for the upcoming game, Mystic Clockwork. With Minori once again struggling to draw, Kyoya and Miki visit her and notifies them that she will not be able to meet the deadline. Back at the office, Kyoya is notified that the game's engine is full of errors that are unlikely to all be fixed in time, while Eiko pleads to the boss to delay the game's release to no avail. Kyoya then asks the president to delay the release using his experience from HaruSora to justify his reasoning, but the president still refuses. One month later, Mystic Clockwork is released and is critically panned for the lack of Minori's artwork, the number of bugs, and the inconsistent gacha drop rates, resulting in the game's server going offline indefinitely for maintenance. The president scolds Eiko, and this time Kyoya decides not to intervene. Despite announcing her retirement, Nanako uploads a new song that gives Kyoya some inspiration about how to move forward.
11	"Be Prepared"; Transliteration: "Kakugo o Kimete" (Japanese: 覚悟を決めて)	Nao Miyoshi	Nachi Kio	Minoru Ōhara	September 18, 2021
Kyoya informs the president that he is replacing the game's engine with one purchased with his team's budget from a reputable company after a thorough analysis. Additionally, he plans to compensate the players generously as an apology for the game's bugs and give his team members two days off, among other fixes. Despite his skepticism, the president lets Kyoya carry out his plan. Kyoya revisits Minori and shows her some artwork from HaruSora that motivates her to draw. With the fixes coming together, Kyoya is informed that Eiko is leaving for Okinawa. Thinking that Eiko is quitting the company, Kyoya rushes to the airport to meet her before she leaves. Kyoya tells Eiko that he has made others who work for him quit despite producing results. Eiko criticizes him for lacking confidence and taking on too much burden from others while accidentally confessing her love to him. Eiko leaves for Okinawa, telling Kyoya that she is returning. After seeing her off and wishing to return to the old days, Keiko appears, and Kyoya figures out that she is the one who sent him to travel through time.
12	"Facing Forward Again"; Transliteration: "Mō Ichido Mae o Muita" (Japanese: もういちど前を向いた)	Tomoki Kobayashi	Nachi Kio	Royden B	September 25, 2021
Keiko warns Kyoya that it is unlikely he will be as happy as he is right now if he goes back into the past, but Kyoya decides to go through with it, determined to make others happy. Before returning to the past, Kyoya spends one more night with his family. After seeing Maki's drawings and Minori's artwork in Mystic Clockwork, Aki is inspired to draw again. The next day after bidding farewell to Aki and Maki, Kyoya meets up with Keiko, who compliments him for not using his knowledge of the future to hurt others. Kyoya replies, saying that he is dropping his high and mighty act. Keiko sends Kyoya 11 years into the past on the day after that Tsurayuki dropped out of school. This time, Kyoya accepts Tsurayuki's decision and adapts to his absence. A few months later, Nanako gets a new job singing the theme song for a doujin game, with Kyoya prioritizing her independence. At the same time, Aki remains in a slump, having not drawn since the HaruSora project. Kyoya then has a chance encounter with Minori, and after helping her get the inspiration needed to draw, Aki begins drawing again. Sometime later, Kyoya meets up with Tsurayuki again outside a theater after declaring that his remake is just beginning.

== Reception ==
The light novel series ranked sixth in 2018 and seventh in 2019 in Takarajimasha's annual light novel guide book Kono Light Novel ga Sugoi!, in the bunkobon category.
