= List of Oricon number-one singles of 2020 =

The following is a list of Oricon number-one singles of 2020.

== Chart history ==
Issue date	Song	Artist(s)	Ref.
January 6	"Gattan Gotton Go!"	Boys and Men	
January 13	"Inochi no Uta"	Mariya Takeuchi	
January 20	"Initial/Yume o Uchinuku Shunkan ni!"	Poppin'Party	
January 27	"Sōyūtoko Aru yo ne?"	SKE48	
February 3	"Imitation Rain/D.D."	SixTones vs. Snow Man	
February 10	"Mubou na Yume wa Sameru Koto ga Nai"	STU48	
February 17	"Imitation Rain/D.D."	SixTones vs. Snow Man	
February 24	"Imitation Rain/D.D."	SixTones vs. Snow Man	
March 2	"Sonna Koto Nai yo"	Hinatazaka46	
March 9	"I Am/Muah Muah"	Hey! Say! JUMP	
March 16	"Protostar"	JO1	
March 23	"Brava!! Brava!! Brava!!/Ray of Light"	Jaejoong	
March 30	"Shitsuren, Arigatō"	AKB48	
April 6	"Shiawase no Hogoshoku"	Nogizaka46	
April 13	"Fallin' Flower"	Seventeen	
April 20	"Movin' On"	Sandaime J Soul Brothers	
April 27	"Ai o Shiru"	Last Idol	
May 4	"3−2"	HKT48	
May 11	"The Beyond Gunpla 40th Edition"	Luna Sea	
May 18	"3−2"	HKT48	
May 25	"Fly with Me"	Millennium Parade	
June 1	"Starry Sky"	Passcode	
June 8	"Mirai wa Onna no Tame ni Aru"	Walküre	
June 15	"Top" (Japanese ver.)	Stray Kids	
June 22	"Mazy Night"	King & Prince	
June 29	"Kanzai Boya"	KinKi Kids	
July 6	"Shōko"	Johnny's West	
July 13	"Last Mermaid..."	Hey! Say! JUMP	
July 20	"Fanfare"	Twice	
July 27	"Nights Cold"	Tomohisa Yamashita	
August 3	"Navigator"	SixTones	
August 10	"Kite"	Arashi	
August 17	"Run"	Sexy Zone	
August 24	"Smile"	Twenty Twenty	
August 31	"Re:Live"	Kanjani Eight	
September 7	"Stargazer"	JO1	
September 14	"Omoidaseru Koi wo Shiyō"	STU48	
September 21	"Oh Yeah"	Boys and Men	
September 28	"Endless Summer"	Kis-My-Ft2	
October 5	"It's My Life/Pineapple"	V6	
October 12	"Your Song"	Hey! Say! JUMP	
October 19	"Kissin' My Lips/Stories"	Snow Man	
October 26	"Homura"	LiSA	
November 2	"Homura"	LiSA	
November 9	"Homura"	LiSA	
November 16	"Not Found"	Sexy Zone	
November 23	"New Era"	SixTones	
November 30	"Koi Nanka No Thank You!"	NMB48	
December 7	"Seishun 'Subliminal'"	=Love	
December 14	"Step and a Step"	NiziU	
December 21	"Nobody's Fault"	Sakurazaka46	
December 28	"I Promise"	King & Prince	

== See also ==
- List of Oricon number-one albums of 2020
