= Marie Mizuno =

Japanese voice actress

- 水野 麻里絵
- Born: September 20; Tokyo, Japan
- Occupation: voice actress
- Years active: 2010-present
- Agent: Axl-One
- Notable work: Future Card Buddyfight as Gao Mikado

Marie Mizuno (水野 麻里絵, Mizuno Marie; born September 20 in Tokyo) is a female Japanese voice actress affiliated with 81 Produce.

== Filmography ==
=== Television animation ===
2011

- Sket Dance as Delinquent (ep 37)
- Battle Girls: Time Paradox as Soldier A (ep 11)

2012

- Duel Masters Victory as Kyūsaku
- Baku Tech! Bakugan as Harubaru Hinode
- Beyblade: Shogun Steel as Waitress #2

2013

- Tokyo Ravens as Female Teacher
- Beast Saga as Village Woman A (eps 1, 3)
- Pokémon: Black & White: Rival Destinies as Mareep

2014

- D-Frag! as Mob Son
- Hero Bank as Kaito Kōshō (eps 27–31)
- Future Card Buddyfight as Gao Mikado
- Yowamushi Pedal Grande Road as Elementary School Boy (ep 16); Midōsuji's Classmate (ep 3)

2015

- Future Card Buddyfight 100 as Gao Mikado
- Doraemon as Girl

2016

- Future Card Buddyfight DDD as Gao Mikado

2017

- Future Card Buddyfight X as Gao Mikado

2019

- Beyblade Burst GT as Takane Kusaba

2020

- Sorcerous Stabber Orphen as Volkan

2021

- Sorcerous Stabber Orphen: Battle of Kimluck as Volkan

=== OVA ===
- Magi: Adventure of Sinbad as Boy (eps 1–2)
- Little Witch Academia: The Enchanted Parade as Thomas's Friend

=== Dubbing roles ===
==== Live-action ====
- The Odd Life of Timothy Green as Rod Best
- Deep Rooted Tree

==== Animation ====
- Capture the Flag as Mike Goldwing
