= Magical Destroyers =

Japanese anime television series

- Key visual

魔法少女マジカルデストロイヤーズ (Mahō Shōjo Majikaru Desutoroiyāzu)
- Genre: Magical girl
- Created by: Jun Inagawa
- Anime television series
- Directed by: Hiroshi Ikehata
- Written by: Daishiro Tanimura
- Music by: Gin Hashiba
- Studio: Bibury Animation Studios
- Licensed by: Crunchyroll (streaming); SEA: Plus Media Networks Asia
- Original network: MBS, TBS, BS-TBS
- Original run: April 8, 2023 – June 24, 2023
- Episodes: 12

Magical Destroyers (魔法少女マジカルデストロイヤーズ, Mahō Shōjo Majikaru Desutoroiyāzu; "Magical Girl Magical Destroyers") is an original Japanese anime television series created by Jun Inagawa and animated by Bibury Animation Studios. It is directed by Hiroshi Ikehata, with Masao Kawase serving as assistant director, Daishiro Tanimura writing the scripts, Yuki Sawa designing the characters, and Gin Hashiba composing the music. The series aired from April 8 to June 24, 2023, on the Animeism programming block on MBS, TBS and BS-TBS. The opening theme song is "Magical Destroyer" by Aimi, while the ending theme song is "Gospelion in a classic love" by The 13th tailor. Crunchyroll streamed the series.

== Plot ==
In a near-future dystopian Japan, circa 2011, a mysterious organization known as the SSC has indoctrinated most of Japan into accepting the destruction of otaku culture, while their Shobon Army rounds up all otaku and their prized possessions into concentration camps. Resisting them are a trio of magical girls, named Anarchy, Blue, and Pink, guided by a young man known only as the Otaku Hero. After spending three years fighting for the remains of Akihabara, Anarchy decides to go on the offensive and reunite with her fellow magical girls to gain back the culture from the oppressive regime.

== Characters ==
Otaku Hero (オタクヒーロー, Otaku Hīrō)
Voiced by: Makoto Furukawa
The protagonist, an unnamed otaku who leads the revolution against the SSC.
Anarchy / Kirara Akabane (アナーキー, Anākī)
Voiced by: Fairouz Ai
An ill-tempered Magical Girl who wields a staff with the Anarchy symbol embedded at the end of it, she can create and destroy different objects. Anarchy wishes to defeat the SSC so she can return to being a normal girl.
Blue / Blueberry Ai Kanda (ブルー, Burū)
Voiced by: Aimi
An extremely horny Magical Girl with a love of surströmming who wields an odd shaped scythe that can cut through almost anything. Her wish is to see New Order live when the SSC are gone.
Pink (ピンク, Pinku)
Voiced by: Tomoyo Kurosawa
A magical girl who hides behind a gasmask and speaks in a verbal tic that only Blue seems to understand. She wields a large, magical syringe and is skilled at creating different kinds of drugs. Her wish is to work in a maid cafe one day.
Kyōtarō (狂太郎)
Voiced by: Tomori Kusunoki
A strange floating, talking mascot creature who is often used as a meat shield due to its ability to regenerate from any kind of damage.
Shobon
Voiced by: Soma Saito
The leader of the SSC. Their true identity is unknown, but they wear a formal black suit and tie, and their head is covered by a white TV with a cute face drawn on the front.
Slayer (スレイヤー, Sureiyā)
Voiced by: Yu Serizawa
A young woman dressed in Gothic Lolita style who wields an umbrella and works under Shobon.
Nick (ニック, Nikku)
Voiced by: Kazuyuki Okitsu
A veteran otaku with a vast information network who provides support and training to Otaku Hero.
Old Leader (オールドリーダー, Ōrudo Rīdā)
Voiced by: Tomokazu Sugita
Military Otaku (ミリオタ, Miriota)
Voiced by: Junji Majima
Game Otaku (ゲーオタ, Gēota)
Voiced by: Takehito Koyasu
Train Otaku (鉄オタ, Tetsu Ota)
Voiced by: Shō Okumura
JSDF Otaku (自衛隊オタ, Jieitai Ota)
Voiced by: Ikuto Kanemasa
Anime Otaku (アニオタ, Aniota)
Voiced by: Tetsu Inada
Idol Otaku (ドルオタ, Doruota)
Voiced by: Haruki Ishiya
Pro-Wrestling Otaku (プロレスオタ, Puroresuota)
Voiced by: Shinya Takahashi
@Gō (＠号)
Voiced by: Koki Uchiyama
Itasha Driver (痛車ドライバー, Itasha Doraibā)
Voiced by: Nobuyuki Hiyama
Marcus (マーカス, Mākasu)
Voiced by: Kenta Miyake
Chōgō-shi (調合師)
Voiced by: Shigeru Chiba
Adam (アダム, Adamu)
Voiced by: Nobuhiko Okamoto
Eve (イブ, Ibu)
Voiced by: Maki Kawase

== Episodes ==
No.	Title	Directed by	Written by	Storyboarded by	Original release date
1	"Rage Against Akihabara"; Transliteration: "Akiba ni Kakumei no Honō Moyu" (Japanese: アキバに革命の炎燃ゆ)	Kento Shintani	Daishiro Tanimura	Hiroshi Ikehata	April 8, 2023 (Note: This episode aired at 2:23 a.m. JST, 28 minutes after the original air time.)
One day in Akihabara, an unnamed Otaku Hero notices an entire store being cleared out by heavily armed soldiers with cute mascot-like faces. Their organization, the SSC, manages to brainwash most of Japan into accepting the destruction of all things otaku, under the guise of their "protection." Otaku Hero manages to rally other otaku who escaped the onslaught of the SSC with a girl known as Anarchy and a strange floating talking animal, even taking back Akihabara for the otaku after the SSC lead a campaign of demolishing the neighborhood and loading all the otaku and their pop culture artifacts into train cars bound for an open-air prison. After about three years of fighting and no further progress, Otaku Hero plans to give up leadership of the group to Anarchy as the SSC mount a new offensive on their stronghold. However, after Anarchy risks her life to raise the otaku flag in Akihabara once more, Otaku Hero decides to help her and uses a blimp to bomb the enemy until they retreat. Anarchy then follows up by skydiving into an SSC prison camp and freeing the otaku there, who then revolt against their oppressors. Further into the prison, Anarchy frees her comrade, Magical Girl Blue, from her solitary captivity.
2	"Gobo Gobo!"; Transliteration: "Momoiro Nō Miso o Uragaese" (Japanese: 桃色脳ミソを裏返せ)	Takanori Yamamoto	Daishiro Tanimura	Ryōsuke Tsuchiya	April 15, 2023 (Note: This episode aired at 1:53 a.m. JST, 2 minutes before the original air time.)
After rescuing Blue, Otaku Hero decides to rescue Pink as well to reunite the Magical Girls before the SSC attack again. With the help of his friend Nick, Otaku Hero discovers that Pink is holding a rave at a nearby location, and walks there with Anarchy and Blue. However, Pink refuses to join them, as she prefers her current carefree lifestyle. After chatting, Pink offers Blue and Anarchy a challenge, to share a drug with her that connects their consciousness together. Anarchy and Blue fight Pink and her manifestations in the mental realm, but Pink has the advantage with her own mind as the battlefield. Anarchy tries to remind Pink of their shared past together and their reasons for winning their war against the SSC, but Pink is unmoved until her underlings all decide to enter the same mental realm and encourage Pink to live out her dreams with their support. Pink gives in and wakes up in the real world in the arms of Otaku Hero, who later announces that the Magical Girls have reunited.
3	"Pessimistic Overdrive"; Transliteration: "Ekizōsuto Nōto (Note: Exhaust Note) o Kiite Ike" (Japanese: エキゾーストノートを聞いて逝け)	Umeko Haruno, Kento Shintani	Yutaka Sato	Ikuo Gesoi	April 22, 2023 (Note: This episode aired at 2:08 a.m. JST, 13 minutes after the original air time.)
The resistance in Akiba are gawked at by tourists as "@-Go" of the Four Heavenly Kings seeks to destroy them. Otaku Hero and a nearby itasha driver quickly deduce that the enemy is another car otaku brainwashed to fight for the SSC, and use that to their advantage as the three Magical Girls come together to take down the enemy mech. However, their celebration is short-lived when an evil Magical Girl appears and kills @-Go, then quickly defeats the combined might of Anarchy, Blue, and Pink. The itasha driver sacrifices himself by hitting the evil Magical Girl with his car, giving the resistance time to regroup.
4	"R U Ready?"; Transliteration: "Mahō Shōjo darake no Suiei Taikai" (Japanese: 魔法少女だらけの水泳大会)	Ikabomber	Toshimitsu Takeuchi	Hiroshi Ikehata	April 29, 2023
Otaku Hero gets help from Pink to restore an old mecha model, but Pink's drug makes the model fly out of the base on its own, soon falling into the Kanda River. Otaku Hero and the Magical Girls then run into a group of older otaku who believe that the younger ones aren't "real" otaku, as they had to hide their obsessions from the world while the younger ones casually flaunt them and expanded the definition of otaku. The older otaku refuse to let them search the river for the mecha toy, but Otaku Hero doesn't want to fight them, so with Kyotaro's help both sides engage in an impromptu sporting tournament. Suddenly, Shobon sends their aquatic mecha beasts to destroy all the otaku in the river. The Magical Girls and the recovered mecha toy combine their strength to drain the river, leaving the enemies helpless and allowing all the otaku to reclaim their formerly-submerged treasures.
5	"Climbing to the Hell"; Transliteration: "Dai-niji Nakano Jihen" (Japanese: 第二次中野事変)	Daisuke Eguchi	Daishiro Tanimura	Daisuke Eguchi	May 6, 2023
Otaku Hero gets a tip from Nick about a drug that can make the Magical Girls stronger, but first the group must travel to Shibuya, where the SSC is dragging away anyone who shows even little signs of being an otaku. The group is helped by an American otaku named Marcus, who leads them to a doctor named Chogo. He denies being an otaku or a drugmaker at first, but soon relents and offers to help strengthen the Magical Girls if they will retrieve a rare old figurine box set for him. The box in question is held at the top of Nakano Broadway. Otaku Hero and the Magical Girls climb their way to the top of the building, and just as they are about to fall, Marcus reappears to save them. The Magical Girls destroy the building's anti-otaku defenses and retrieve the item for Chogo, who then gives them one capsule each of his special drug. Pink wants to use it right away, but Otaku Hero decides to save them for now. Later, Marcus is given his daughter back by the SSC along with their passports and is warned to leave Japan, while Chogo leaves his box set under some garbage.
6	"Revolution Eve"; Transliteration: "Kakumei Zenya" (Japanese: 革命前夜)	Yuichiro Aoki, Daisuke Eguchi	Daishiro Tanimura	Daisuke Eguchi	May 13, 2023
As the SSC storm another otaku stronghold, Otaku Hero flashes back to how he met the Magical Girls, when they were somehow delivered to him in a giant box, and how they spent a year together scrounging for food and supplies while trying to avoid the SSC. Otaku Hero tells the girls about his past walking through Akihabara with his dad, a technology otaku, before he passed on. He then gives the girls homemade outfits before asking them to leave, as Otaku Hero wants to lead an otaku revolution against the SSC. The girls then somehow gain magical powers and their outfits are transformed to suit each of their tastes. Together, Otaku Hero and the empowered Magical Girls come together to start a revolution. In the present, Otaku Hero gets in radio range and rallies the troops to fight back against the SSC. However, Otaku Hero and the Magical Girls suddenly have suction cups stuck to each of their heads.
7	"Ultimate Game"; Transliteration: "Chītā (Note: Cheater)-domo e Sasageyo Banka" (Japanese: チーターどもへ捧げよ挽歌)	Takanori Yamamoto	Yutaka Sato	Takanori Yamamoto	May 20, 2023
Otaku Hero and the Magical Girls are transported into a video game world by Adam, a self-proclaimed pro gamer who joined the SSC after his online accounts were banned for hacking before the otaku purge. Adam and his AI companion, Eve, take Blue and Pink hostage, then force Otaku Hero and Anarchy to fight for them. Otaku Hero and Anarchy are barely able to fight with Adam and Eve, using Kyotaro's endless regeneration to take the hits for them, but soon realize that the weapons in this world are imaginary constructs, and use their own imaginations to fight back. Eve tries to brainwash Anarchy with an attack, but sees something inside her mind that causes Eve to collapse and take the digital world down with her. Eventually, Otaku Hero and the Magical Girls return to the ruins of Akiba, where the other otaku have managed to fight off the SSC incursion. Nick broadcasts a message across the world that they will be hosting a new otaku convention for their revolution, which Otaku Hero calls Wanku.
8	"Dancing Queens"; Transliteration: "Wan ku!" (Japanese: わんく！)	Hiroki Tanaka	Toshimitsu Takeuchi	Hiroki Tanaka	May 27, 2023
The otaku struggle to think of how to set up the proposed Wanku convention until Otaku Hero scribbles on a piece of paper, “Tell everyone how much you like the things you like.” Otaku Hero takes on a Producer role to bring all the people and objects together to throw a successful show, but then is hit by crippling self-doubts about the entire show and sees a vision where he erased his own suggestion and didn't hold Wanku, and another where he holds Wanku but the SSC attack. In the end, he decides to go forward with Wanku and holds a concert starring himself and the Magical Girls. However, the concert is interrupted by Shobon's face on the screen, and a quiet girl who rolls a disembodied, talking head on the stage.
9	"Love Is Nightmare"; Transliteration: "Yabe e Kyoudai ga Oshiyoseru" (Japanese: やべぇ兄妹が押し寄せる)	Shinya Iino	Yutaka Sato	Shinya Iino	June 3, 2023
The talking head and his sister, Himawari, introduce themselves as one of the Four Heavenly Kings before the head stretches itself into giant proportions to attack the concert. Blue and Pink try to hit Himawari, but the head keeps blocking their attacks, claiming that Himawari is his sister and he survived after asking her to kill him. A flashback shows Shobon and Slayer consoling Himawari and offering to bring her beheaded brother back to life in exchange for joining the SSC. Unable to defeat Himawari and her brother's head, Pink and Blue beg Otaku Hero to give them Chogo's drugs. After being transported to an astral plane, the Magical girls come back stronger. However, while fighting the head, they attach it to a blow-up doll and accidentally make him stronger. Himawari then picks up Blue's scythe and cuts off her brother's head again. Another flashback reveals that Himawari wanted to die with her brother before she was interrupted by Shobon. The two of them merge into an acid-spitting spider monster while Blue and Pink are unconscious from the drug's side effects. Slayer decides to kill them both, yelling that only she can kill Anarchy. After killing the monster, Shobon tells Slayer to wait until tomorrow to fight Anarchy and the others.
10	"Silent Before Rage"; Transliteration: "Kan tose Gijidō: Kakumei sō Shingeki!" (Japanese: 陥とせ議事堂 革命総進撃！)	Masanori Miyata, Ichiro Aoki	Toshimitsu Takeuchi	Daisuke Eguchi	June 10, 2023
With Slayer's threat hanging over the heads of the otaku, Otaku Hero decides to rally the troops by calling for a last-ditch raid on the National Diet Building in Chiyoda to defeat Shobon and free Japan from their control before Slayer comes to Akihabara. After arming all the surviving otaku who attended Wanku, Otaku Hero leads the charge, helped by Nick and the older otaku from before to storm the Diet. Meanwhile, Slayer and two other Magical Girls each face off against their counterparts over the ruins of Akiba. As they fight each other, the Magical Girls slowly realize that they are fighting alternate versions of themselves. Otaku Hero manages to make his way into a conference room, only to find a human-sized puppet of Shobon with a book full of hand-drawn anime storyboards that detail specific instances of Otaku Hero's adventures throughout the series, including the immediate future where several otaku die during the raid. Anarchy, Blue, and Pink each take Chogo's drug and transform into monstrous versions of themselves as Otaku Hero screams in despair.
11	"Magical Destroyers"	Daisuke Eguchi	Daishiro Tanimura	Daisuke Eguchi	June 17, 2023
A failed game developer named Saito meets a Goddess calling herself Origin and together they create a new world in the computer. In the present, Anarchy, Blue and Pink continue to fight their counterparts in Slayer, Orange, and Green, respectively. The original Magical Girls emerge triumphant, but this was also part of Shobon's script as they end up destroying their own memories. Otaku Hero runs back into Akiba just the Magical Girls are transformed into the evil Magical Destroyers.
12	"What You Like, as Much as You Like"; Transliteration: "Suki na Mono o Suki na dake" (Japanese: 好きなものを好きなだけ)	Ikabomber, Umeko Haruno	Daishiro Tanimura	Hiroshi Ikehata	June 24, 2023
The otaku celebrate their victory at the Diet Building until Nick calls them back to Akiba. Shobon reveals that the whole world was his creation and revenge on the otaku who hated him, and everything followed his script, including the setup of Otaku Hero as both the hero and "final boss" of the world. Furthermore, Kyotaro was the Point of View character the whole time, as the flying mascot transforms into Origin. Otaku Hero fights against Shobon, but is quickly killed by the Magical Destroyers, who then join the SSC against the otaku. However, the otaku hold a funeral for Otaku Hero as his helmet is picked up by an unknown member of the Shobon Army. Over the next two years, despite the SSC's extermination campaign of otaku across Japan and the world, rumors persist that Otaku Hero is still alive. Shobon holds a ceremony to burn a large pile of otaku paraphernalia, but Shobon discovers the world has gone off-script as a new generation of Otaku Hero and his friends reveal themselves to challenge the SSC and the Magical Destroyers, while Origin laughs at the scene from afar.
