= List of Oricon number-one albums of 2020 =

The following is a list of Oricon number-one albums of 2020, which uses data from combined (physical, digital, and streaming) and physical sales.

== Chart history ==
=== Combined sales ===
Issue date	Album	Artist(s)	Ref.
January 6	Buster Bros!!!: Before the 2nd D.R.B	Buster Bros!!!	
January 13	20200101	Shingo Katori	
January 20	Go with the Flow	Takuya Kimura	
January 27	Ceremony	King Gnu	
February 3	Ceremony	King Gnu	
February 10	Mad Trigger Crew: Before the 2nd D.R.B	Mad Trigger Crew	
February 17	Pop × Step!?	Sexy Zone	
February 24	Bright New World	Little Glee Monster	
March 2	AAA 15th Anniversary All Time Best: Thanx AAA Lot	AAA	
March 9	Map of the Soul: 7	BTS	
March 16	Story	NEWS	
March 23	Review II: Best of Glay	Glay	
March 30	W Trouble	Johnny's West	
April 6	To-y2	Kis-My-Ft2	
April 13	Man with a "B-Sides & Covers" Mission	Man with a Mission	
April 20	Your Story	Juju	
April 27	Maximum Huavo	Inaba/Salas	
May 4	Our Best	Jin Akanishi	
May 11	Suck My World	The Oral Cigarettes	
May 18	Your Story	Juju	
May 25	Synesthesia	Rain Drops	
June 1	The Dream Chapter: Eternity	TXT	
June 8	BanG Dream! Girls Band Party! Cover Collection Vol.4	Various artists	
June 15	Eyes	Milet	
June 22	More & More	Twice	
June 29	Love Faders	Endrecheri	
July 6	Heng:garæ	Seventeen	
July 13	Make You Happy	NiziU	
July 20	5	Mrs. Green Apple	
July 27	Map of the Soul: 7 – The Journey	BTS	
August 3	Letters	Bish	
August 10	Tōsaku	Yorushika	
August 17	Stray Sheep	Kenshi Yonezu	
August 24	Stray Sheep	Kenshi Yonezu	
August 31	Stray Sheep	Kenshi Yonezu	
September 7	Stray Sheep	Kenshi Yonezu	
September 14	L&	King & Prince	
September 21	24H	Seventeen	
September 28	#Twice3	Twice	
October 5	Hinatazaka	Hinatazaka46	
October 12	You Need the Tank-Top	Yabai T-Shirts Yasan	
October 19	Eien Yori Nagai Isshun: Ano Koro, Tashika ni Sonzaishita Watashitachi	Keyakizaka46	
October 26	Leo-Nine	LiSA	
November 2	Twelve	Iz*One	
November 9	Minisode1: Blue Hour	TXT	
November 16	This Is Arashi	Arashi	
November 23	Strawberry Prince	Strawberry Prince	
November 30	Romance	Hiroji Miyamoto	
December 7	Be	BTS	
December 14	Soundtracks	Mr. Children	
December 21	Akira	Masaharu Fukuyama	
December 28	Fab! -Music Speaks.-	Hey! Say! JUMP	

=== Physical sales ===
Issue date	Album	Artist(s)	Ref.
January 6	Buster Bros!!!: Before the 2nd D.R.B	Buster Bros!!!	
January 13	20200101	Shingo Katori	
January 20	Go with the Flow	Takuya Kimura	
January 27	Ceremony	King Gnu	
February 3	The Dream	NCT Dream	
February 10	Mad Trigger Crew: Before the 2nd D.R.B	Mad Trigger Crew	
February 17	Pop × Step!?	Sexy Zone	
February 24	Bright New World	Little Glee Monster	
March 2	AAA 15th Anniversary All Time Best: Thanx AAA Lot	AAA	
March 9	Map of the Soul: 7	BTS	
March 16	Story	NEWS	
March 23	Review II: Best of Glay	Glay	
March 30	W Trouble	Johnny's West	
April 6	To-y2	Kis-My-Ft2	
April 13	Man with a "B-Sides & Covers" Mission	Man with a Mission	
April 20	Your Story	Juju	
April 27	Maximum Huavo	Inaba/Salas	
May 4	Our Best	Jin Akanishi	
May 11	Suck My World	The Oral Cigarettes	
May 18	Your Story	Juju	
May 25	Man with a "Remix" Mission	Man with a Mission	
June 1	The Dream Chapter: Eternity	TXT	
June 8	BanG Dream! Girls Band Party! Cover Collection Vol.4	Various artists	
June 15	Eyes	Milet	
June 22	More & More	Twice	
June 29	Love Faders	Endrecheri	
July 6	Heng:garæ	Seventeen	
July 13	Heng:garæ	Seventeen	
July 20	For Live: Bish Best	Bish	
July 27	Map of the Soul: 7 – The Journey	BTS	
August 3	Letters	Bish	
August 10	Love Covers II	Jaejoong	
August 17	Stray Sheep	Kenshi Yonezu	
August 24	Stray Sheep	Kenshi Yonezu	
August 31	Stray Sheep	Kenshi Yonezu	
September 7	Stray Sheep	Kenshi Yonezu	
September 14	L&	King & Prince	
September 21	24H	Seventeen	
September 28	#Twice3	Twice	
October 5	Hinatazaka	Hinatazaka46	
October 12	You Need the Tank-Top	Yabai T-Shirts Yasan	
October 19	Eien Yori Nagai Isshun: Ano Koro, Tashika ni Sonzaishita Watashitachi	Keyakizaka46	
October 26	Leo-Nine	LiSA	
November 2	Twelve	Iz*One	
November 9	Minisode1: Blue Hour	TXT	
November 16	This Is Arashi	Arashi	
November 23	Strawberry Prince	Strawberry Prince	
November 30	Romance	Hiroji Miyamoto	
December 7	Be	BTS	
December 14	Soundtracks	Mr. Children	
December 21	Akira	Masaharu Fukuyama	
December 28	Fab! -Music Speaks.-	Hey! Say! JUMP	

== See also ==
- List of Oricon number-one singles of 2020
