= Future Card Buddyfight =

Anime television series

フューチャーカード バディファイト (Fyūchā Kādo Badifaito)
- Manga
- Written by: Mitsuhisa Tamura
- Published by: Shogakukan
- English publisher: SG: Shogakukan Asia
- Magazine: CoroCoro Comic
- Original run: November 2013 – April 2018
- Volumes: 11
- Manga

Future Card Buddyfight Ace
- Published by: Shogakukan
- English publisher: SG: Shogakukan Asia
- Magazine: CoroCoro Comic
- Original run: May 2018 – February 2019
- Volumes: 4
- Anime television series
- Directed by: Shigetaka Ikeda
- Written by: Masanao Akahoshi
- Music by: Hiroaki Hayama, Kazushi Miyakoda
- Studio: OLM, Inc.; Xebec (studio)
- Licensed by: SA / SEA: Muse Communication
- Original network: TV Aichi
- English network: CA: Teletoon; SEA: Nickelodeon; US: Kabillion
- Original run: January 4, 2014 – April 4, 2015
- Episodes: 64
- Anime television series

Future Card Buddyfight 100
- Directed by: Shigetaka Ikeda
- Written by: Masanao Akahoshi
- Music by: Hiroaki Hayama, Kazushi Miyakoda
- Studio: OLM, Inc.; Xebec
- Original network: TV Aichi
- Original run: April 11, 2015 – March 26, 2016
- Episodes: 50
- Anime television series

Future Card Buddyfight Triple D
- Directed by: Shigetaka Ikeda
- Written by: Masanao Akahoshi
- Music by: Hiroaki Hayama, Kazushi Miyakoda
- Studio: OLM, Inc.; Xebec
- Original network: TV Aichi
- Original run: April 2, 2016 – March 25, 2017
- Episodes: 51
- Anime television series

Future Card Buddyfight X
- Directed by: Shigetaka Ikeda
- Written by: Shinzo Fujita
- Studio: OLM, Inc.; Xebec
- Original network: TV Aichi
- English network: CA: Toon-A-Vision
- Original run: April 1, 2017 – March 31, 2018
- Episodes: 52
- Anime television series

Future Card Buddyfight X: All-Star Fight
- Directed by: Shigetaka Ikeda
- Written by: Shinzo Fujita
- Studio: OLM, Inc.; Xebec
- Original network: TV Aichi
- Original run: April 7, 2018 – May 26, 2018
- Episodes: 8
- Anime television series

Future Card Buddyfight Ace
- Directed by: Takao Kato
- Written by: Hiroyuki Kawasaki
- Studio: OLM, Inc.; Xebec
- Original network: TV Aichi
- English network: PH: Cartoon Network; US: Kabillion
- Original run: June 2, 2018 – March 30, 2019
- Episodes: 43 + 4 clipshows

Future Card Buddyfight (Japanese: フューチャーカード バディファイト, Hepburn: Fyūchā Kādo Badifaito) was a Japanese collectible card game created by Bushiroad. The first products began releasing simultaneously worldwide from January 24, 2014.

On June 15, 2020, Bushiroad announced it would end production of the card game, with the final new product release occurring on September 25, 2020, and official tournaments continuing through June 2021.

An anime television series adaptation by OLM, Inc. and Dentsu began airing from January 4, 2014. An English version produced by Bushiroad and Ocean Productions is airing in Singapore as well as being streamed worldwide via YouTube. A manga adaptation was serialized in Shogakukan's CoroCoro Comic from November 2013 to April 2018. It was followed by a manga series Shin Future Card Buddyfight from May 2018 to February 2019. It is published in English by Shogakukan Asia. The English dub formerly aired in Canada.

The first season ended on April 4, 2015, and was followed by a sequel series, Future Card Buddyfight Hundred, which ran from April 11, 2015, to March 26, 2016. Future Card Buddyfight Hundred was followed by Future Card Buddyfight Triple D which ran from April 1, 2016, to March 24, 2017. After the airing of Future Card Buddyfight Hundred episode 25, it was announced on the official YouTube channel that all episodes from that point and onwards will be in Japanese only with English subtitles. It was followed by Future Card Buddyfight X, which ran from April 1, 2017, to March 31, 2018, and the dub resumed on April 15, 2017. Future Card Buddyfight X was followed by Future Card Buddyfight X: All-Star Fight which ran from April 7, 2018, to May 26, 2018. Future Card Buddyfight X: All-Star Fight was followed by Future Card Buddyfight Ace (Future Card Shin Buddyfight) which ran from June 2, 2018, to March 30, 2019.

The Future Card Buddyfight Ace anime series ended in April 2019 and continued in the monthly manga – Bessatsu CoroCoro Comic Special from April 30, 2019, to early 2020.

Future Card Buddyfight Ace was released on Kabillion on September 27, 2019. This is the first time that a Future Card Buddyfight series has aired on American television. The original anime would also be released on Kabillion.

In January 2020, the digital distribution rights to the franchise were acquired by Kidtagious Entertainment which has released the anime on multiple streaming platforms.

== Characters ==
=== Original Generation ===
Gao Mikado (未門 牙王, Mikado Gaō)
Voiced by: Marie Mizuno (Japanese); Sabrina Pitre (Season 1-2, credited as Patricia Bacchus) (English)
A 12-year-old boy who is the main protagonist of the series. He is the brother of his sister Hanako and the younger brother of Yota Mikado. Throughout the series until Future Card Buddyfight X, he had three buddies, whom are all dragons, with his first buddy being Drum Bunker Dragon, his second being Bal Dragon, and his third and current buddy being Batzz. In Future Card Buddyfight Ace, while not physically appearing, he has become the husband of Paruko Nanana and the father of his two sons Yuga and Haru.
Drum Bunker Dragon (ドラムバンカー・ドラゴン, Doramubankā Doragon)
Voiced by: Shintarō Ōhata (Japanese); Brett Bauer (English)
Also known as Fang Slade Terrestrial XIV, he is Gao Mikado's first and original Buddy. Hailing from Dragon World, he is the son and heir of Drum Bunker Dragon Father, the leader of their clan. During the events of Future Card Buddyfight Hundred, he temporarily became an Omni Lord, a member of a group of monsters from other worlds who sought to protect Earth from the demonic monster Yamigedo, before stepping down from his title much later. Prior to the events of Future Card Buddyfight Triple D, he had returned to Dragon World to become the new chief of his clan.
Tasuku Ryuenji (龍炎寺 タスク, Ryūenji Tasuku)
Voiced by: Soma Saito (Japanese); Cole Hanson (English)
A prodigy Buddy Police officer and is the buddy of Jackknife Dragon. He initially had an unbreakable streak of winning buddyfights and was undefeated until he met his match with Gao Mikado, eventually becoming one of his friends. While kind-hearted and humorous, Tasuku has a strong sense of justice and is dedicated to fighting all evil. However, after his sense of justice was corrupted by Kyoya Gaen, he joined the Disaster Group as the mysterious Purgatory Knight and the buddy of Demios Sword Dragon. After being brought back to his senses, he became buddies again with Jackknife. In Future Card Buddyfight Triple D, he temporarily stepped down from the Buddy Police to continue his studies but continued to join Gao and his friends in their adventures before later rejoining the Buddy Police in Future Card Buddyfight X. In Future Card Buddyfight Ace, he is now the commissioner of the Buddy Police.
Jackknife Dragon (ジャックナイフ・ドラゴン, Jakkunaifu Doragon)
Voiced by: Hiroki Yasumoto (Japanese); Jonathan Love (English)
Also known as Findar the 100th, he is a green dragon from Dragon World, who is Tasuku Ryuenji's Buddy. He has a very close relationship with Tasuku, who also sees him as family. In Future Card Buddyfight Hundred, After finishing his training with Armordeity Dynamis, he evolved into a cybernetic dragon and is now part of Star Dragon World.
Kuguru Uki (宇木 くぐる, Uki Kuguru)
Voiced by: Mikoi Sasaki (Japanese); Maddie Duke (English)
Gao's friend and supporter. Similarly to Baku Omori, she has strong knowledge on different types of buddyfight cards, which earned her the nickname "The Library". She has lights in her hair, which can light up.
Baku Omori (大盛 爆, Ōmori Baku)
Voiced by: Shuta Morishima (Japanese); Sam Duke (English)
Gao's friend and supporter. He is a professional deck-builder, who builds all of Gao's decks for his buddyfights. He is also known for his strong hunger, and is usually seen eating, even while attending class.
Noboru Kodo (虎堂 ノボル, Kodō Noboru)
Voiced by: Izumi Kitta (Japanese); Zoe Slusar (English)
A 6th-grader student at Aibo Academy and one of Gao's classmates and rivals, before later becoming one of his friends. He is arrogant over his skills at buddyfighting and believes that Dragon Knights are superior to dragons, which initially made him despised by Drum Bunker Dragon. His buddy was originally Dragon Knight, Red Baron and his current buddy is Dragon Knight, El Quixote. Noboru is also known to get annoyed/angry at anyone who calls the Tiger on his shirt a "kitten", whether intentional or unintentional. In Future Card Buddyfight Hundred he was captured by First Knight of the Apocalypse, Gratos, and then brainwashed into serving his master Yamigedo before he was later freed from his control. During the events of Future Card Buddyfight Triple D, he was accidentally turned into a girl by Demon Lord Asmodai but eventually turned back to normal.
Paruko Nanana (奈々菜 パル子, Nanana Paruko)
Voiced by: Sora Tokui (Japanese); Carol-Anne Day (English)
A buddyfight match commentator.
Hanako Mikado (未門 花子, Mikado Hanako)
Voiced by: Suzuko Mimori (Japanese); Malia Ashley Kerr (English)
Gao's little sister.
Tetsuya Kurodake (黒岳 テツヤ, Kurodake Tetsuya)
Voiced by: Kazutomi Yamamoto (Japanese); Alex Bergen (English)
Demon Lord Asmodai (魔王アスモダイ, Maō Asumodai)
Voiced by: Tetsuharu Ōta (Japanese); Lucas Gilbertson (English)
Kiri Hyoryu (氷竜 キリ, Hyōryū Kiri)
Voiced by: Aimi (Japanese); Hannah Dickinson (English)
Rouga Aragami (荒神 ロウガ, Aragami Rōga)
Voiced by: Minoru Hirota (Japanese); Daegan Manns (English)
Drum Bunker Dragon's Father (ドラムバンカー・ドラゴン・ファーザー, Doramubankā Doragon Fāzā)
Voiced by: Chikao Ōtsuka (Japanese); Tony Valdez (English)
Sophia Sakharov (ソフィア・サハロフ, Sakharov Sofia)
Voiced by: Mamiko Noto (Japanese); Nikkita Bradette (S1), Ali DeRegt (S2) (English)
Magoroku Shido (祠堂孫六, Shido Magoroku)
Voiced by: Kenta Zaima (Japanese); Cole Hanson (English)
Davide Yamazaki (山崎ダビデ, Yamazaki Davide)
Voiced by: Akio Suyama (Japanese); Chris Cook (English)
Kyouya Gaen (臥炎キョウヤ, Gaen Kyouya)
Voiced by: Satoshi Hino
Tsurugi Takihara (滝原剣, Takihara Tsurugi)
Voiced by: Yoshihisa Kawahara (Japanese); Victor Atelevich (English)
Buddy Police officer.
Kazane Fujimiya (富士宮風音, Fujimiya Kazane)
Voiced by: Mariko Honda (Japanese); Jessica Hilbrecht (English)
Zanya Kisaragi (如月斬夜, Kisaragi Zanya)
Voiced by: Mitsuki Saiga (Japanese); Shawn Seward (S1-S2), Kaz Nixon (S4) (English)
Akatsuki Kisaragi (如月暁, Kisaragi Akatsuki)
Voiced by: Suzuko Mimori (Japanese); Griffin Kingston (S1-S2) (English)
Zanya's little brother.

=== New Generation ===
Yuga Mikado (未門 友牙, Mikado Yuga)
Voiced by: Takumi Mano (Japanese); Griffin Kingston (English)
He is the main protagonist of the Ace anime and the son of Gao Mikado and Paruko Mikado, older brother of Haru, cousin of Ion Nanana, grandson of Takashi and Suzumi Mikado and great-grandson of Hanae Juumonji.
Ranma Kakogawa (加古川ランマ, Kakogawa Ranma)
Voiced by: Kei Shindō (Japanese); Conner Christmas (English)
Yuga's best friend and the co-founder of RanGa Channel.
Gargantua Dragon (ガルガンチュア・ドラゴン)
Voiced by: Tetsu Inada
Masato Rikuō (陸王マサト, Rikuō Masato)
Voiced by: Shuta Morishima
Agito (雷斧 アギト)
Voiced by: Tsuguo Mogami
Subaru Hoshiyomi (星詠スバル, Hoshiyomi Subaru)
Voiced by: Daiki Kobayashi
Cross Astolugia (天占竜 クロス・アストルギア)
Voiced by: Soma Saito
Haru Mikado (未門 晴, Mikado Haru)
Voiced by: Rimi Nishimoto
Amaterasu (光の電神 アマテラス)
Voiced by: Aimi

== Anime series notes ==
- In episode 4, characters from Cardfight!! Vanguard make special cameo appearances such as Aichi Sendou, Kamui Katsuragi, Ren Suzugamori, Toshiki Kai and Tetsu Shinjo. Misaki Tokura (who is voiced by Izumi Kitta in Japanese and Carol-Anne Day in English (both of whom also voice roles in the Japanese and English versions of Buddyfight) is the only one who has a spoken line.

== Anime ==
The TV animation was released in Japan on TV Aichi on January 4, 2014, with the animation done by OLM, Inc. Bushiroad simulcasts an English dub in Singapore, Malaysia, and in North America through YouTube, Hulu, and Crunchyroll. Canada's Teletoon aired the English dub from January 8, 2015, to September 7, 2015. It returned to Teletoon from October 2015 to February 2016. As with their first series, Cardfight!! Vanguard, Bushiroad is airing the series in English on YouTube and Hulu. As of episode 17, the dub is also airing on Crunchyroll. The English airings are delayed from the Japanese airings by a few hours and are considered the same day simulcast, but due to the time difference between Japan and the States, the English airdate ends up being a day ahead of the Japanese airing. The English dub for Hundred went on a hiatus on October 2, 2015.

== Trading card game ==
=== Products ===
==== Booster Pack ====
One box of booster packs contains 30 booster packs. Each pack contains 5 random cards. The rarities of cards are categorized into Common (C), Uncommon (UC), Rare (R), Double Rare (RR), Triple Rare (RRR), Buddy Rare (BR) and Special Parallel (SP).

List of Booster Packs

- BT01 – Dragon Chief (ドラゴン番長, Doragon Banchō): Released on January 31, 2014
- BT02 – Cyber Ninja Squad (サイバー忍軍, Saiba Ningun): Released on April 5, 2014
- BT03 – Drum's Adventures (ドドド大冒険 〜ドラゴン大集合!!〜, Dododo Daibōken ~Doragon Daishūgō!!~): Released on July 4, 2014
- BT04 – Darkness Fable (轟斬轟く!!, Gōzan Todoroku!!): Released on October 10, 2014
- BT05 – Break to the Future (煉獄KNIGHTS, Rengoku Naitsu): Released on January 30, 2015

List of Hundred Booster Packs

- H-BT01 – Neo Enforcer Ver.E: Released on May 1, 2015
- H-BT02 – Galaxy Burst: Released on July 17, 2015
- H-BT03 – Assault of the Omni Lords: Released on October 16, 2015
- H-BT04 – Mikado Evolution: Released on January 22, 2016

List of Triple D Booster Packs

- BP-BT01 – Unleash! Impact Dragon!!: Released on April 15, 2016
- BP-BT02 – Roar! Invincible Dragon!!: Released on July 22, 2016
- BP-BT03 – Annihilate!! Great Demonic Dragon!!: Released on October 21, 2016
- BT-BT04 – Shine! Super Sun Dragon!!: Released on December 23, 2016

List of Triple D Booster Pack Alternatives

- BP-A01 – Buddy Rave: Released on June 24, 2016
- BP-A02 – Four Dimensions: Released on September 23, 2016

List of Triple D Climax Booster Packs

- CBT-01 – Dragon Fighters: Released on February 24, 2017

List of X Booster Packs

- BP-X01 – The Dark Lord's Rebirth: Released on April 21, 2017
- BP-X02 – Chaos Control Crisis: Released on July 14, 2017
- BP-X03 – Overturn! Thunder Empire!: Released on October 20, 2017
- BP-X04 – Rainbow Striker: Released on December 22, 2017

List of X Booster Pack Alternatives

- CBT-A01 – Crossing Generations: Released on June 16, 2017
- CBT-A02 – Evolution & Mutation: Released on August 25, 2017
- CBT-A03 – LVL Up! Heroes & Adventurers!: Released on September 22, 2017
- CBT-A04 – New World Chaos: Released on March 23, 2018

List of X Climax Booster Packs

- CBT-01 – Driven to Disorder: Released on February 23, 2018

List of X2 Booster Packs

- BP-X201 – Buddy Legends: Released on April 20, 2018

List of X2 Booster Pack Alternatives

- BP-X2A01 – Solar Strife: Released on June 8, 2018

List of Ace Booster Packs

- BP-A01 – Gargantua Awakened: Released on August 31, 2018
- BP-A02 – Dimension Destroyer: Released on November 2, 2018
- BP-A03 – Buddy Lineage: Released on December 14, 2018
- BP-A04 – True Awakening of Deities: Released on January 11, 2019

List of Ace Ultimate Booster Packs

- BP-AU01 – Superhero Wars Ω -Advent of Cosmoman!-: Released on September 14, 2018
- BP-AU02 – Miracle Fighters ~Miko & Mel~: Released on September 14, 2018

List of Ace Climax Booster Packs

- S-CBT01 – Golden Garga: Released on March 1, 2019
- S-CBT02 – Violence Vanity: Released on March 1, 2019

==== Character Pack ====
One box of character packs contains 30 character packs. Each pack contains 5 random cards. The rarities of cards are categorized into Common (C), Uncommon (U), Rare (R), Double Rare (RR), Triple Rare (RRR), Buddy Rare (BR), SECRET, and Special Parallel (SP)

List of Character Packs

- CP01 – Burning Valor (100円ドラゴン, Hyaku-en Doragon): Released on March 14, 2014

==== Extra Pack ====
One box of extra packs contains 15 booster packs. Each pack contains 5 random cards. The rarities of cards are categorized into Common (C), Uncommon (UC), Rare (R), Double Rare (RR), Triple Rare (RRR), Buddy Rare (BR) and Special Parallel (SP).

List of Extra Packs

- EB01 – Immortal Entities (不死身の竜神, Fujimi no Ryūjin): Released on June 6, 2014
- EB02 – Great Clash!! Dragon VS Danger (ヤバすぎ大決闘!! ドラゴン VS デンジャー, Yabasugi Daikettō!! Doragon Bāsasu Denjā): Released on September 12, 2014

List of Hundred Extra Packs

- H-EB01 – Miracle Impack!: Released on June 12, 2015
- H-EB02 – Shadow Hero: Released on August 14, 2015
- H-EB03 – Lord of Hundred Thunders: Released on September 25, 2015
- H-EB04 – Buddy Allstars+: Released on December 18, 2015

==== Perfect Pack ====
One box of perfect packs contain 10 perfect packs. Each pack contains 6 random cards. The rarities of cards are categorized into Double Rare (RR), and Buddy Rare (BR). The RR cards are in a golden print.

List of Perfect Packs

- PP01 – Golden Buddy Pack Ver.E: Released on March 6, 2015

List of Hundred Perfect Packs

- H-PP01 – Terror of the Inverse Omni Lords: Released on February 26, 2016

==== Start Deck ====
A pre-constructed starter deck contains 52 pre-set cards. Life counter, rule book, and playmat are included as well.

List of Triple D Start Decks

- SD01 – Scorching Sun Dragon: Released on March 4, 2016
- SD02 – Cross Dragoner: Released on March 4, 2016
- SD03 – Hollow Black Dragon: Released on March 4, 2016

List of X Start Decks

- SDX01 – Demon Dragon Lord of Tempest: Released on April 21, 2017
- SDX02 – Dragon Fielder: Released on April 21, 2017

List of S Start Decks

- SDS01 – Dradeity: Released on July 27, 2018
- SDS02 – Triangulum Galaxy: Released on July 27, 2018
- SDS03 – Spiral Linkdragon Order: Released on July 27, 2018

==== Trial Deck ====
A pre-constructed trial deck contains 52 pre-set cards. Life counter, rule book, and playmat are included as well.

List of Trial Decks

- TD01 – Dominant Dragon (強ドラ, Tsuyodora): Released on January 24, 2014
- TD02 – Savage Steel (フォージング・ブラッド, Fōjingu Buraddo): Released on January 24, 2014
- TD03 – Dragonic Force: Released on March 28, 2014
- TD04 – Braves Explosion: Released on July 4, 2014
- TD05 – Ninja Onslaught: Released on July 4, 2014
- TD06 – Dark Pulse: Released on October 10, 2014
- TD07 – Tomorrow! Asmodai: Released on January 23, 2015

List of Hundred Trial Decks

- H-SD01 – Crimson Fist: Released on April 24, 2015
- H-SD02 – Radiant Force: Released on April 24, 2015
- H-SD03 – Dragonic Star: Released on July 10, 2015
- H-SD04 – Malicious Demons: Released on July 10, 2015

List of Triple D Trial Decks

- H-TD01 – Dragon Emperor of the Colossal Ocean: Released on July 15, 2016

List of Triple D Special Series Decks

- H-SS03 – Golden Buddy Champion Box: Released on December 2, 2016

List of X Trial Decks

- X-TD01 – Decimating Black Dragon: Released on July 14, 2017
- X-TD02 – Ruler of Havoc: Released on July 14, 2017
- X-TD03 – Thunderous Warlords Alliance: Released on October 20, 2017

List of X Special Series Decks

- X-TD04 – Duel Chest: Released on December 8, 2017

List of Ace Special Series Decks

- A-SS01 – Lost Dimension: Released on October 5, 2018
- A-SS02 – 3 Garga Decks! Impact! Triple Punisher: Released on December 7, 2018

List of Ace Trial Decks

- S-TD01 – Draknight: Released on April 26, 2019

=== Organized play ===
Support for the organized play program is provided by Bushiroad. Tournaments and workshops are available in Europe, the United States and Asia-Oceania region. A special promotional card is given to participants of the workshops or tournaments.

Organizers of the events are given a choice between a best-of-1 format and a best-of-3 format for the monthly sanctioned tournaments.

== Lawsuit ==
On January 8, 2021, it was announced Bushiroad was suing Future Card Buddyfight creator Yoshimasa Ikeda and his company Studio Ikecchi for disseminating confidential information about the franchise and copyright infringement and credibility damage to the company. Ikeda had continuously used images from Future Card Buddyfight without Bushiroad's permission.
