= Aimi (actress) =

Japanese voice actress and singer

- 愛美
- Born: Aimi Terakawa; December 25, 1991 (age 34); Kobe, Hyōgo Prefecture, Japan
- Occupations: Voice actress; singer; musician
- Years active: 2010–present
- Agent: Hibiki
- Height: 158 cm (5 ft 2 in)
- Musical career
- Genres: J-pop; Anison
- Instruments: Vocals; guitar
- Years active: 2011–present
- Labels: Pony Canyon; King Records (2020–present)
- Member of: Poppin'Party
- Website: aimi.info

Aimi Terakawa (寺川 愛美, Terakawa Aimi; born December 25, 1991), known mononymously as Aimi (愛美) is a Japanese voice actress, singer, and guitarist from Kobe, Hyōgo Prefecture who is affiliated with the talent agency Hibiki. After aspiring to become an entertainer for part of her life, she started her singing career in 2011 after winning an audition to become part of the Tantei Opera Milky Holmes franchise. That same year, Aimi made her solo music debut with the release of her first single "Tenshi no Clover"; the title song was used as the opening theme to the anime series Astarotte no Omocha!.

Aimi is a member of the vocal duo Feathers alongside fellow voice actress Ayasa Itō. She is also the voice of the idol Julia in the game The Idolmaster Million Live! and Kasumi Toyama in the multimedia franchise BanG Dream!. Aimi also performs live as part of the latter's in-universe girlband Poppin'Party.

== Early life ==
Aimi's text logo

Aimi was born in Hyōgo Prefecture on December 25, 1991. She had aspired to become a singer since childhood. During her high school years, she taught herself how to play the guitar and perform in a band. She initially only aspired to become a singer, but she became interested in voice acting after becoming familiar with the anime series Macross Frontier, where she was impressed at how the series was able to combine music and animation in its storytelling. Hoping to become a professional singer, she began participating at various singing contests, such as the Animax Anison Grand Prix in 2009. She also performed at various live venues, including a steakhouse in Kobe.

== Career ==
Aimi's entertainment career began after passing an audition to become a part of the Tantei Opera Milky Holmes multimedia franchise. She made her voice acting debut with the franchise as the character Kazumi Tokiwa. As part of the franchise, Aimi became a member of the music group Feathers together with fellow voice actress Ayasa Itō. She later changed her stage name to the mononym Aimi, starting with the release of her first solo single "Tenshi no Clover" (天使のClover) on May 3, 2011. The title song was used as the opening theme to the anime Astarotte no Omocha!. In 2013, Aimi also hosted her first solo concert, A Live, where she sang her full discography with a total of fourteen songs. She released four more singles between 2011 and 2013, with their title tracks being used in anime series such as Ben-To, The Ambition of Oda Nobuna, Fairy Tail, and The Severing Crime Edge.

In 2012, Aimi was a guest at Anime Expo as part of promotions for the Cardfight!! Vanguard franchise. She was then cast as the character Julia in the mobile game The Idolmaster Million Live!. She would then release her first full album Love in November 2013. In 2015, she became part of the multimedia project BanG Dream!, playing the series' protagonist Kasumi Toyama and performing live as part of the in-universe band Poppin'Party.

In December 2020, Aimi announced she would release a solo single in spring 2021 under the King Records label. On September 1, 2021, Aimi revealed that her younger sister is Chiharu, who was the voice actress of character Reika Satō in the idol girl group 22/7, and had recently joined Hibiki.

== Filmography ==
=== Anime series ===
2011

- Cardfight!! Vanguard, Suiko

2012

- Cardfight!! Vanguard: Asia Circuit, Suiko
- Gon, Female Elephant, Frog 3

2013

- Cardfight!! Vanguard: Link Joker, Suiko Tatsunagi
- Freezing Vibration, Roxanne Elipton
- Robocar Poli, Benny
- Futari wa Milky Holmes, Kazumi Tokiwa
- The "Hentai" Prince and the Stony Cat., Emi, Emanuela Pollarola

2014

- Argevollen, Hikaru Rikuru
- Cardfight!! Vanguard: Legion Mate, Suiko Tatsunagi
- Chō-Bakuretsu I-Jigen Menko Battle Gigant Shooter Tsukasa, Ataru Dōmoto, Ruri Dōmoto
- Future Card Buddyfight, Kiri Hyoryu
- Engaged to the Unidentified, Mayura Momouchi
- Oneechan ga Kita, Tomoya Mizuhara
- Recently, My Sister Is Unusual, Moa Torii

2015

- Cardfight!! Vanguard G: GIRS Crisis , Am Chouno
- Chaos Dragon, Ulrika Ledesma
- Plastic Memories, Sherry
- Tantei Kageki Milky Holmes TD, Kazumi Tokiwa

2016

- Luck & Logic, Yukari Nanahoshi

2017

- BanG Dream!, Kasumi Toyama

2018

- BanG Dream! Girls Band Party! Pico, Kasumi Toyama

2019

- Afterlost, Kikyō
- BanG Dream! 2nd Season, Kasumi Toyama
- BanG Dream! Film Live, Kasumi Toyama
- Symphogear XV, Millaarc

2020

- BanG Dream! 3rd Season, Kasumi Toyama
- BanG Dream! Girls Band Party! Pico: Ohmori, Kasumi Toyama
- D4DJ First Mix, Kyoko Yamate

2021

- BanG Dream! Girls Band Party! Pico Fever!, Kasumi Toyama
- Battle Game in 5 Seconds, Yūri Amagake
- D4DJ Petit Mix, Kyoko Yamate
- How a Realist Hero Rebuilt the Kingdom, Carla Vargas
- Remake Our Life!, Nanako Kogure

2022

- Life with an Ordinary Guy Who Reincarnated into a Total Fantasy Knockout, Curme, Maid chief
- Love Live! Nijigasaki High School Idol Club 2nd Season, Jennifer
- Teppen!!!!!!!!!!!!!!! Laughing 'til You Cry, Yomogi Takahashi

2023

- Magical Destroyers, Blue
- Helck, Iris
- TenPuru, Yuzuki Aoba
- I'm in Love with the Villainess, Misha Jur
- The Idolmaster Million Live!, Julia
- Jujutsu Kaisen, Yuko Ozawa
- BanG Dream! It's MyGO!!!!!, Kasumi Toyama

2024

- The Banished Former Hero Lives as He Pleases, Mylene

2025

- Even Given the Worthless "Appraiser" Class, I'm Actually the Strongest, Akahane
- Tougen Anki, Kuina Sazanami

2026

- High School! Kimengumi, Mari Oda
- Haibara's Teenage New Game+, Serika Hondo

=== Anime films ===
2021

- BanG Dream! Episode of Roselia I: Promise, Kasumi Toyama
- BanG Dream! Film Live 2nd Stage, Kasumi Toyama

2022

- BanG Dream! Poppin' Dream!, Kasumi Toyama
- Suzume, Miki

=== Video games ===
2013

- The Idolmaster Million Live!, Julia

2015

- Disgaea 5: Alliance of Vengeance, Liezerota

2016

- Girls' Frontline, MDR, TAC-50

2017

- BanG Dream! Girls Band Party!, Kasumi Toyama
- The Idolmaster Million Live! Theater Days, Julia

2020

- Pokémon Masters, Zinnia

2022

- Nikke: Goddess of Victory, Mica, Yan

2023

- Honkai: Star Rail, Serval Landau

2026

- Umamusume: Pretty Derby, Casino Drive

TBA

- Brown Dust 2, Scheherazade

=== Multimedia projects ===
- Paradox Live, Aoi Kureha
- Milgram, Kotoko Yuzuriha

== Discography ==
Album

- Love (Pony Canyon, November 6, 2013)
- Live It Now (King Records, June 12, 2024)

Singles

- "Tenshi no Clover" (Pony Canyon, May 3, 2011) – Astarotte no Omocha! opening
- "Live for Live: Ōkami-tachi no Yoru-" (Pony Canyon, November 2, 2011) – Ben-To opening
- "Link" (Pony Canyon, July 18, 2012) – Oda Nobuna no Yabō opening
- "We're the stars" (Pony Canyon, February 27, 2013) – Fairy Tail ending
- "Unmei no Ori" (Pony Canyon, April 17, 2013) – The Severing Crime Edge opening
- "Restarting!!" (King Records, April 7, 2021)
- "Kazanear" (King Records, July 28, 2021) – How a Realist Hero Rebuilt the Kingdom ending
- "Magical Destroyet" (King Records, April 26, 2023) – Magical Destroyers opening
