= MyGO!!!!! =

Japanese band

- MyGO!!!!! in BanG Dream! Girls Band Party!. From left to right: Anon, Soyo, Tomori, Taki, Rāna

Background information
- Origin: Japan
- Genre: Rock
- Years active: 2022–present
- Label: Bushiroad Music
- Spinoff of: BanG Dream!
- Members: Hina Yōmiya (Tomori Takamatsu); Rin Tateishi (Anon Chihaya); Hina Aoki (Rāna Kaname); Mika Kohinata (Soyo Nagasaki); Coco Hayashi (Taki Shiina)
- Website: en.bang-dream.com/artists/mygo/

MyGO!!!!! is a Japanese all-female rock band that is part of Bushiroad's media franchise BanG Dream!. Formed in 2022, the group's members portray fictional characters in the project's anime series and mobile games BanG Dream! Girls Band Party! and BanG Dream! Our Notes, in addition to performing their characters' respective instruments in live concerts.

The band consists of Hina Yōmiya (vocals), Rin Tateishi (rhythm guitar), Hina Aoki (lead guitar), Mika Kohinata (bass), and Coco Hayashi (drums). In the game, MyGO!!!!! is represented by five first-year high-school students from three different schools: Tomori Takamatsu (Yōmiya), Anon Chihaya (Tateishi), Rāna Kaname (Aoki), Soyo Nagasaki (Kohinata), and Taki Shiina (Hayashi).

Of the twelve bands in BanG Dream!, MyGO!!!!! is one of seven whose members perform their own music.

== History ==
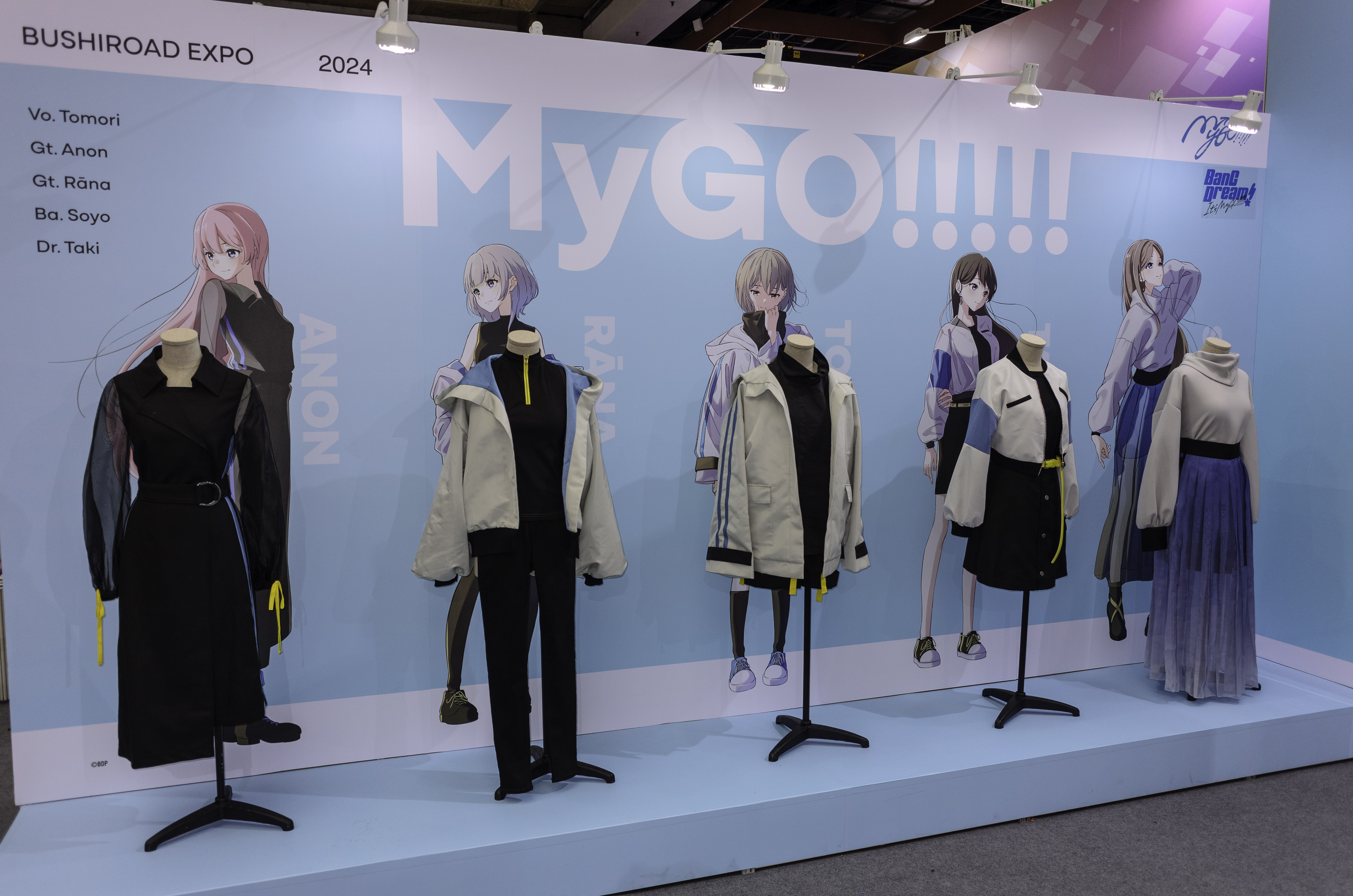
Costumes worn by MyGO!!!!! members on stage, displayed at Bushiroad Expo at 2024 Taipei International Comics & Animation Festival

MyGO!!!!! was announced in 2022, as a start of the BanG Dream! franchise's new approach of "synchronizing" reality and the fictional universe. While their characters were named, their voice actresses initially remained anonymous. To keep their identities hidden during their first shows, they played with limited stage lighting that covered their faces. MyGO!!!!!'s voice actresses were officially revealed at their fourth live show on April 9, 2023.

The first standalone concert for MyGO!!!!! took place on July 3, 2022, with Morfonica's drummer, mika, as a supporting musician, and they opened for the "Special Live Girls Band Party!" concert in November. The band released their debut single "Mayoiuta" on November 9.

After the release of the anime, BanG Dream! It's MyGO!!!!! in June 2023 that centered mainly around the in-universe band's formation, their popularity exploded. When they released their first album, Meisekiha, in November, it peaked at 5th in the Oricon radio charts. In September 2024, they sold out a live show at the National Exhibition and Convention Center in Shanghai, and in late December their second album, Michinoku, reached 3rd on the Oricon charts.

== Members ==
All members were revealed at the same time, during their April 2023 live show, where previously their identities were hidden and some members had yet to join the band.

- Hina Yōmiya (lead vocals) – Hina Yomiya made her voice acting debut in 2020 and had most notably voiced characters such as Nodoka Yagi in Selection Project and Shinju Inui in My Dress-Up Darling. The voice of Tomori Takamatsu, she stated that she shares many characteristics with her character, such as collecting rocks.
- Rin Tateishi (rhythm guitar) – Rin Tateishi voices Anon Chihaya, her first voice acting role. Before joining the band, she previously only knew how to play the acoustic guitar, but after joining the band, she learnt how to play the electric guitar.
- Hina Aoki (lead guitar) – Hina Aoki is the voice for Rāna Kaname. Previously, she played the piano up until high school, and has an interest in singing. She is a fan of fellow BanG Dream! bands Roselia and Raise A Suilen. Aoki previously appeared in a minor role in Argonavis: The Movie.
- Mika Kohinata (bass guitar) – Mika Kohinata's first voice acting role has been voicing Soyo Nagasaki. She was influenced into becoming a voice actor that performs live concerts in-character after becoming a fan of Love Live!.
- Coco Hayashi (drums) – The voice of Taki Shiina, Coco Hayashi was influenced to learn the drums by her brother, who was a member in a rock band. Hayashi had notably voiced Mirai Momoyama in Kiratto Pri Chan, replaced Tomori Kusunoki as the voice and live actor of Setsuna Yuki in Love Live! Nijigasaki High School Idol Club and had minor voice acting roles in The Promised Neverland before joining BanG Dream!.

== In-universe band ==
Band logo

In the anime and game, MyGO!!!!! is one of two bands, the other being Ave Mujica, created following the breakup of Tomori, Soyo, and Taki's former band Crychic in their third year of middle school. The band name is a play on the word maigo (迷子), meaning "Lost Children" in Japanese, in reflection of their individual lack of direction. Five exclamation marks are suffixed to represent each band member.

The band made its anime debut in the 2023 spin-off series BanG Dream! It's MyGO!!!!!, which chronicles the band's formation.

== Musicality ==
In an interview, MyGO!!!!!'s producers characterized their approach to the band's music as resembling punk rock and melodic hardcore.

The band's song titles are described as "hard to read," using kanji with multiple meanings in a style called Ateji. This style was adopted during production of the band's first original song, "Mayoiuta". The initial title proposal included hiragana, but the band's producers wanted something catchier. The revised title was in kanji only, so after discussion within the project, the decision was made to use difficult-to-read song titles. Since then, MyGO!!!!!'s song titles have always been presented in kanji only.

== Discography ==
As of 27 December 2024, MyGO!!!!! has 13 original songs.

=== Singles ===
Year	Title	Release date	Peak Oricon chart position	Notes	Ref.
2022	"Song of the Lost Star" (迷星叫, Mayoiuta)	November 9	43		
2023	"A Momentary Sound" (音一会, Otoichie)	April 12	19		
2023	"One Droplet" (壱雫空, Hitoshizuku)	August 9	12	BanG Dream! It's MyGO!!!!! opening theme	
2024	"Wanderer / Reminiscence" (砂寸奏 / 回層浮, Sasurai / Kaisou)	March 20	10		
2024	"Panorama" (端程山)	July 24	13		
2025	"A Moment Like an Eternity" (聿日箋秋, Ichijitsusenshu)	April 23	4		
2025	"Past-Marked Pillar" (往欄印, Ourai)	August 6	5		
2025	"Descending Thoughts of Calm" (静降想, Silent)	December 3	7		

=== Albums ===
Year	Title	Release date	Peak Oricon chart position	Notes	Ref
2023	Meisekiha (迷跡波)	1 November	5		
2024	BanG Dream! Cover Collection Extra Volume (バンドリ！カバーコレクション Extra Volume)	10 July		Album made in conjunction with Ave Mujica that contained full version of cover songs	
2024	Michinoku (跡暖空)	28 December	3		
2026	Chiheisen (致並跡)	July 15	6		
