= Hina Aoki =

Japanese voice actress and singer

- 青木 陽菜
- Born: January 5, 2000 (age 26); Miyagi Prefecture, Japan
- Occupations: Voice actress, singer
- Years active: 2021–present
- Agent: Hibiki
- Notable work: BanG Dream! as Raana Kaname; Magical Girl Lyrical Nanoha Exceeds Gun Blaze Vengeance as Yuzu Kodera

Hina Aoki (青木 陽菜, Aoki Hina; born January 5, 2000) is a Japanese voice actress and singer from Miyagi Prefecture who is affiliated with Hibiki. She started her career in 2021 after passing an audition organized by the Hibiki and the talent agency Ace Crew, and in 2022 became part of the BanG Dream! multimedia franchise, voicing Raana Kaname and becoming lead guitarist of the band MyGO!!!!!. Her music has also been used in the Cardfight!! Vanguard franchise and the anime series anime series Magical Girl Lyrical Nanoha Exceeds Gun Blaze Vengeance.

== Biography ==
Aoki was born in Miyagi Prefecture on January 5, 2000. She had an interest in music from an early age, taking piano lessons from the age from the age of five. She became interested in anime when she was in junior high school, becoming a fan of series such as Attack on Titan. She also became a fan of the multimedia franchise Love Live!, in particular its smartphone game Love Live! School Idol Festival. After being encouraged to enter entertainment when she was in high school, she decided to pursue voice acting as a career and pursued singing auditions during her university studies. After passing a joint audition held by the talent agencies Hibiki and Ace Crew in 2020, she started taking voice acting lessons, commuting between Miyagi and Tokyo. She debuted as a voice actress in 2021 and joined the agency Hibiki along with fellow passer Rin Tateishi.

Aoki became part of the multimedia franchise BanG Dream! in 2022, becoming the lead guitarist of the band MyGO!!!!! and the voice actress of the character Raana Kaname. Initially, the band's members were anonymous, with their identities only being revealed during a performance in April 2023. She made her debut as a solo musician in 2023, releasing the song "Blue Bud" which was used as the third ending theme to the anime series Cardfight!! Vanguard Will+Dress. She would continue to perform things songs for Cardfight!! Vanguard, with her song "Amairo" (天色) being used as the ending theme to the 2025 anime series Cardfight!! Vanguard: Divinez Deluxe-hen, and her song "World's End Trigger" was used as the second opening theme to the anime series Cardfight!! Vanguard: Divinez Parallactic Clash in 2026. She released her first album Letters on October 1, 2025. In 2026 she released the song "Ephermal", which was used as the ending theme to the anime series Magical Girl Lyrical Nanoha Exceeds Gun Blaze Vengeance; she also voiced the character Yuzu Kodera.

== Filmography ==
2023

- BanG Dream! It's MyGO!!!!!, Raana Kaname
- Cardfight!! Vanguard Will+Dress, Halona Walker

2025

- BanG Dream! Ave Mujica, Raana Kaname

2026

- Magical Girl Lyrical Nanoha Exceeds Gun Blaze Vengeance, Yuzu Kodera

== Discography ==
=== Albums ===
- Letters (October 1, 2025)
