= Magical Girl Lyrical Nanoha Exceeds Gun Blaze Vengeance =

Japanese anime television series

- Promotional artwork

魔法少女リリカルなのは EXCEEDS Gun Blaze Vengeance (Mahō Shōjo Ririkaru Nanoha Ekushīzu Gan Bureizu Venjensu)
- Genre: Magical girl; Science fiction
- Created by: Masaki Tsuzuki
- Manga

Magical Girl Lyrical Nanoha Exceeds
- Written by: Masaki Tsuzuki
- Illustrated by: Shuichi Kawakami
- Published by: Kodansha
- Imprint: Sirius KC
- Magazine: Suiyōbi no Sirius
- Original run: April 16, 2025 – present
- Volumes: 3
- Anime television series
- Directed by: Takayuki Hamana
- Written by: Masaki Tsuzuki
- Music by: Kai Shiono
- Studio: Seven Arcs
- Licensed by: Crunchyroll
- Original network: Tokyo MX, BS11, AT-X, HTB
- Original run: July 5, 2026 – September 20, 2026
- Episodes: 12
- Preceded by
- Magical Girl Lyrical Nanoha The Movie 1st (2010); Magical Girl Lyrical Nanoha The 2nd A's (2012); Magical Girl Lyrical Nanoha Reflection (2017); Magical Girl Lyrical Nanoha Detonation (2018)
- icon

Magical Girl Lyrical Nanoha Exceeds Gun Blaze Vengeance (Japanese: 魔法少女リリカルなのは EXCEEDS Gun Blaze Vengeance, Hepburn: Mahō Shōjo Ririkaru Nanoha Ekushīzu Gan Bureizu Venjensu) is a Japanese anime television series created by Masaki Tsuzuki and produced by Seven Arcs and is part of the Magical Girl Lyrical Nanoha franchise for its 20th anniversary. It aired from July to September 2026. A tie-in manga series written by Tsuzuki and illustrated by Shuichi Kawakami, titled Magical Girl Lyrical Nanoha Exceeds, began serialization on Kodansha's Niconico-based Suiyōbi no Sirius manga service in April 2025.

== Plot ==
=== Setting ===
The series takes place in the Nanoha franchise's movie continuity, which began as a retelling of the first season and A's but spun off into its own timeline following the release of Magical Girl Lyrical Nanoha Reflection and Magical Girl Lyrical Nanoha Detonation. In the aftermath of those movies' events, Nanoha and her friends, now teenagers, founded the EXCEEDS organization, which travels between parallel Earths and cooperates with their governments to end conflicts before they potentially spill over into other dimensions.

=== Synopsis ===
Thirty years ago, a mysterious "Invasive Alien Species" suddenly appeared and nearly brought about the end of the world. Although humanity has persevered and people continue to go about their daily lives, the world remains on the brink of collapse due to occasional territorial clashes with these creatures. In response, the United Nations unveils EXCEEDS, an organization tasked with investigating and combating the Alien Species.

The story follows Shiina Kuze, a young hunter in the far-eastern nation of Mizuho who exterminates invasive species to afford a living for herself and her younger sister, Setsuna. However, their peaceful life is shattered when Shiina is mortally injured in an alien attack, prompting Setsuna to grant her the power of a "Diaboli"—a mutant—leading to her being recruited into EXCEEDS.

== Characters ==
=== Main characters ===
Shiina Kuze (久瀬 シイナ, Kuze Shiina)
Voiced by: Azusa Tachibana
A 17-year-old high school student in the country of Mizuho on a parallel Earth who hunts Invasive Alien Species to earn a living for herself and her adoptive younger sister, Setsuna. However, one day, she is attacked by a Diaboli and mortally injured, prompting Setsuna—revealed to also be a Diaboli—to save her by turning her into one as well at the cost of her own life, leading to EXCEEDS recruiting her.
After becoming a Diaboli, she gained pyrokinetic powers—Guren—that allow her to grow stronger by absorbing other living beings. She is also skilled with firearms and uses them together with her powers.
Towa Yorumi (夜海 トワ, Yorumi Towa)
Voiced by: Asaki Yuikawa
The 18-year-old leader of "Diaboli Slayer", a group of Diaboli hunting other Diaboli, who is searching for a mysterious "Flame Diaboli". Meeting Shiina under her public persona as an ordinary high school student, the two become quick friends, unaware of each other's true identities.
She fights using a katana and her mutation—Gluttony—allows her to absorb other Diaboli and acquire their unique mutations.

=== Legacy characters ===
Nanoha Takamachi (高町 なのは, Takamachi Nanoha)
Voiced by: Yukari Tamura
A 13-year-old EXCEEDS investigator who stumbles upon Shiina and recruits her into the organization. In the original series, she was a 9-year-old elementary school student on Earth who discovered she has strong magical potential upon meeting an injured mage, after which she partnered with the sentient magic device Raising Heart and was tasked with taking over their mission of retrieving several magical relics that had crashlanded on Earth.
Fate Testarossa (フェイト・テスタロッサ, Feito Tesutarossa)
Voiced by: Nana Mizuki
A 13-year-old EXCEEDS enforcer. In the original series, she was a 9-year-old citizen of the magical world of Midchilda who, alongside her sentient magical device Bardiche, was tasked by her criminal mother with stealing several magical relics that had crashlanded on Earth, leading her to come into conflict with Nanoha before eventually befriending her after being taken into protective custody.
Hayate Yagami (八神 はやて, Yagami Hayate)
Voiced by: Kana Ueda
The head of EXCEEDS, who is actually only 13 years old but uses magic to assume an adult appearance befitting her role. In A's, she was an orphaned 9-year-old girl on Earth who became the master of the cursed Tome of the Night Sky, which granted her strong magical potential but also slowly consumed her life, though she was ultimately saved with Nanoha and Fate's help after the tome's consciousness sacrificed itself.

=== Supporting characters ===
Setsuna Kuze (久瀬 セツナ, Kuze Setsuna)
Voiced by: Rina Hidaka
An 11-year-old elementary school student and Shiina's adoptive younger sister. Secretly a Diaboli with pyrokinesis, she hid her true nature from Shiina for fear of rejection. However, she was forced to reveal herself when another Diaboli attacked her and Shiina, who accepted her regardless. Unfortunately, the Diaboli mortally injured them both, prompting her to transfer her powers to Shiina, saving her by turning her into a Diaboli as well, at the cost of her own life.
Shiori Aizawa (相沢 シオリ, Aizawa Shiori)
Voiced by: Chiharu
A 20-year-old member of "Diaboli Slayer", a group of Diaboli who hunt other Diaboli. Once the daughter of a wealthy family, her relatives were killed by a spider Diaboli, who turned her into a Diaboli as well before attempting to feed on her, but she was saved by Towa just in time. Afterward, she and Towa formed Diaboli Slayer, with herself providing funding for the organization.
Her mutation—Spider—allows her to control spiders and produce threads, poisons, and drugs.
Yuuna Kitamori (喜多森 ユーナ, Kitamori Yuuna)
Voiced by: Aika Kobayashi
A 17-year-old member of "Diaboli Slayer", a group of Diaboli who hunt other Diaboli. She grew up in an orphanage that secretly sold its occupants as food for Diaboli. After discovering the truth, she was turned into a Diabol and sold off as food herself, but Towa saved her, after which she joined Diaboli Slayer.
Her mutation—Strong Arms—allows her to enlarge her arms, granting her superhuman strength.
Aoi Niina (新名 アオイ, Niina Aoi)
Voiced by: Ayasa Itō
A 14-year-old member of "Diaboli Slayer", a group of Diaboli who hunt other Diaboli. She became homeless after losing her late family's savings to scammers, which the corrupt police turned a blind eye to, and later got scammed again by a Diaboli drug dealer and turned into Diaboli, which is how Towa found her and recruited her into Diaboli Slayer.
Her mutation—Unlock—allows her to open any door and sever a person's joints; thus, she specializes in infiltration.
Yuzu Kodera (古寺 ユズ, Kodera Yuzu)
Voiced by: Hina Aoki
A 13-year-old member of "Diaboli Slayer", a group of Diaboli who hunt other Diaboli. The daughter of a Diaboli drug dealer, she grew up being used as a guinea pig for new formulas, which left her heavily mutated, until she was rescued by Towa and recruited into Diaboli Slayer.
Her mutations—Gate and Bag—allow her to connect spaces and store away objects.

=== Antagonists ===
Mana Shinomiya (篠宮 マナ, Shinomiya Mana)
Voiced by: Sumire Uesaka
A mysterious Diaboli who seeks power.

== Media ==
=== Manga ===
A tie-in manga series written by Masaki Tsuzuki and illustrated by Shuichi Kawakami, titled Magical Girl Lyrical Nanoha Exceeds, began serialization on Kodansha's Niconico-based Suiyōbi no Sirius manga service on April 16, 2025. The manga's chapters have been collected in three tankōbon volumes as of August 2026.

No.	Release date	ISBN
1	September 9, 2025	978-4-06-540428-7
2	February 9, 2026	978-4-06-542074-4
3	August 7, 2026	978-4-06-543753-7

=== Anime ===
The new anime television series was announced at the franchise's 20th anniversary event on December 28, 2024. It is produced by Seven Arcs and directed by Takayuki Hamana, written and created by Masaki Tsuzuki, with original character designs by Shuichi Kawakami and Issei Aragaki adapting the designs for animation. The series aired July 5 to September 20, 2026, on Tokyo MX and other networks. (Note: Tokyo MX listed the series premiere on July 4 at 25:00, which is effectively July 5 at 1:00 a.m. JST.) The opening theme song is "Crimson Bullet", performed by Nana Mizuki, while the ending theme song is "Ephemeral", performed by Hina Aoki. Crunchyroll is streaming the series.

==== Episodes ====
No.	Title	Directed by (Note: Production staff information is taken from the ending credits of each episode.)	Written by	Storyboarded by	Original release date
1	"Shiina Kuze's Origin"; Transliteration: "Kuze Shiina Origin" (Japanese: 久瀬シイナ Origin)	Kazunobu Fuseki	Masaki Tsuzuki	Takayuki Hamana	July 5, 2026
Shiina Kuze is a high schooler on a small island who hunts "Invasive Alien Species" that suddenly appeared in the world 30 years ago to afford a living for herself and her adoptive younger sister, Setsuna. However, after Shiina returns home from a hunt, the girls are suddenly attacked by a "Diaboli"—a human mutant—who seeks Setsuna. Revealing she is actually a Diaboli herself, Setsuna fights off the attacker before attempting to leave, believing Shiina would not accept a "monster" like her, but the latter stops her and reveals that she had already deduced the truth. Just then, however, the Diaboli attacks again and critically injures them both. To save Shiina, Setsuna transfers her Diaboli powers—pyrokinesis—to her at the cost of her own life, allowing her to defeat the Diaboli. Afterward, Shiina moves to the mainland and continues hunting aliens using her new powers. Spotting a girl being attacked by a huge alien, Shiina attempts to come to her rescue, only for said girl to easily defeat the creature. Asked for her identity, the girl then introduces herself to Shiina as a member of the U.N. agency EXCEEDS: Nanoha Takamachi.
2	"U.N. Research Agency EXCEEDS / Diaboli Hunt"; Transliteration: "Kokuren Chōsa Kikan EXCEEDS / Majin Kari" (Japanese: 国連調査機関EXCEEDS / 魔人狩り)	Yuto Nakamura	Naruhisa Arakawa	Takashi Shiokawa	July 12, 2026
Nanoha and her partner, Fate Testarosa, reveal that they are mages and wish to recruit Shiina for her ability to grow stronger by absorbing Invasive Species with her pyrokinesis. While Shiina initially refuses, she changes her mind and agrees to be taken to their headquarters after they bond whilst defeating a group of Invasive Species who attacked them together. Meeting EXCEEDS' leader, Hayate Yagami, the latter reveals that Diaboli are humans mutated via contact with Invasive Species, either accidentally or through man-made drugs. Shiina is also told about the "Progenitors", the original Invasive Species who birthed all the others. EXCEEDS has been searching for a Diaboli who can grow strong enough to defeat the Progenitors, and they believe Shiina possesses the potential. They then request she join them, and she agrees to save the world from the Invasive Species. Meanwhile, a group of Diaboli named "Diaboli Slayer"—Towa Yorumi, Shiori Aizawa, Yuuna Kitamori, Aoi Niina, and Yuzu Kodera—take down a Diaboli drug cartel, with Towa interrogating the producers about a "flame-wielding Diaboli".
3	"Shiina Kuze and Towa Yorumi"; Transliteration: "Kuze Shiina to Yorumi Towa" (Japanese: 久瀬シイナと夜海トワ)	Takayuki Hamana	Masaki Tsuzuki	Takayuki Hamana	July 19, 2026
Armed with new gear from EXCEEDS, Shiina defeats several Invasive Species with Nanoha's help. Given time off for the rest of the day, Shiina goes into the city, where she runs into Towa rescuing a cat on a bridge. Unaware of each other's true identities, the two quickly become friends over dinner and share contact info. After parting ways with Shiina, however, Towa and the rest of Diaboli Slayer attend a meeting with a Diaboli drug cartel. Having deduced they are the group going after other cartels, the mobsters attempt to attack them but are easily defeated. Towa then questions them about the producers who provide the cartels with these Diaboli drugs—Mana Shinomiya and Eiji Kuragi—and about a "Flame Diaboli", but all they know is that the government is supposedly involved in the drug trade. Afterward, the other Diaboli Slayer members free the cartel's human captives while Towa disposes of some Invasive Species they were keeping whilst recalling her past as a Diaboli test subject.
4	"Towa Yorumi's Origin"; Transliteration: "Yorumi Towa Origin" (Japanese: 夜海トワ Origin)	Takayuki Hamana	Masaki Tsuzuki	Takayuki Hamana	July 26, 2026
EXCEEDS has made steady progress in defeating the Progenitors, having already slain ten, and has become aware of Diaboli Slayer's activities. Elsewhere, Towa reminisces about her past: she grew up as a test subject at a Diaboli drug research facility until the overseers—Mana and Eiji—deemed her defective due to their inability to replicate her mutation and had her shipped out when she lost a fight against a Diaboli with pyrokinesis, which led to her being found and adopted by a hunter couple after Invasive Species attacked the transport. However, her adoptive parents ended up being killed when, during a vacation, they were caught in a public rampage of that same pyrokinetic Diaboli. After euthanizing the Diaboli, realizing this incident was a "marketing stunt" by Mana and Eiji, Towa vowed to destroy the Diaboli drug trade, leading to her forming Diaboli Slayer after meeting the other members. In the present, Towa offers to turn her companions back into humans using her unique mutation, but they remain steadfast in aiding her. Unbeknownst to them, however, Towa fully expects to die in her quest and wonders whether that will make Shiina sad.
5	"Chance Encounter"; Transliteration: "Sōgū" (Japanese: 遭遇)	Yūsuke Nakagama	Masaki Tsuzuki	Miyuki Takahashi	August 2, 2026
Having defeated all the Progenitors in Mizuho, Shiina, Nanoha, and Fate are sent on a mission to slay two in a foreign country. Meanwhile, Diaboli Slayer also heads toward the two Progenitors' territory after uncovering that Mana and Eiji were sighted at a Diaboli Drug production facility in the area, only to find it completely abandoned. Upon arriving at the location, Shiina, Nanoha, and Fate pick up the Diaboli Slayer members' life signals and, assuming they are civilians, approach them to convince them to evacuate; Nanoha confronts Towa, Shiina Yuuna, Aoi, and Yuzu, and Fate confronts Shiori. Unfortunately, negotiations break down once Diaboli Slayer learns the EXCEEDS members have a "Flame Diaboli" with them, prompting them to attack. In the end, while Shiina, Nanoha, and Fate fight them off, all the Diaboli Slayer members manage to escape, with Shiori blowing up the facility. Towa also kills both the Progenitors to prevent them from being used to produce more drugs. Elsewhere, Mana and Eiji are revealed to have watched the entire confrontation, with Mana expressing interest in Towa and asking Eiji to retrieve her.
6	"Kuragi Eiji And Shinomiya Mana / Sunlight"; Transliteration: "Kuragi Eiji to Shinomiya Mana / Yōkō" (Japanese: 蔵木エイジと篠宮マナ / 陽光)	Seven Arcs Direction Department	Masaki Tsuzuki	Gōichi Iwahata	August 9, 2026
While concocting a plan to capture Towa at the request of Mana, who deduced that Towa empowered her companions with her mutation and wants to blackmail her into using it on her, Eiji recounts his first meeting with her: once a struggling salaryman, he was nearly killed by her—an Invasive Species inhabiting a human body after being severely wounded in battle—but she spared him in return for helping her regain her strengh by consuming Diaboli, which he initially did out of fear before gradually growing to care for her, culminating in them building the current Diaboli Drug trade. Elsewhere, Shiina and Towa hang out at a public park together. Towa voices her fears for the future, even as the Progenitors are being defeated, but Shiina convinces her that things will get better. Just then, however, the park is caught in a terrorist attack perpetrated by several parasitic Invasive Species possessing human hosts, masterminded by Eiji, resulting in civilian casualties and prompting Shiina and the rest of EXCEEDS to spring into action.
7	"Jurisdiction #4's Subway Running Extermination Battle"; Transliteration: "Dai Shi Kanku Chikatetsu-dō Tsuiseki Kujo-sen" (Japanese: 第四管区地下鉄道・追跡駆除戦)	Norihiko Sutō	Masaki Tsuzuki	Junichi Sakata	August 16, 2026
The Invasive species began to explode in the park. Shiina and Towa began to exterminate the parasitic Invasive Species. They both learn the delivery man accepted the job from the underworld job market. EXCEEDS begins evacuation and first aid in the park. They also help defeat parasitic Invasive Species and asks for help for the Diaboli Slayers to exterminate the parasitic Invasive Species. Towa doesn't trust EXCEEDS but will tell them, the Diaboli Slayers will cooperate to exterminate the parasitic Invasive Species. Shiina goes to the subway and learn there are parasitic Invasive Species and bombs on remote trains and starts eliminating them. The Diaboli Slayers also arrive in the Subway eliminating all the parasitic Invasive Species. While that is going, Director Hayate of EXCEEDS is wondering why these parasitic Invasive Species are attacking the public and they know it's a terrorist attack from an unknown organization trying to send a message to someone. Eiji and Mana are watching the damage they did to the park. Back to the Subway, Towa and Shiina finally meet and realize they are both Diaboli. Concurrently, the police broadcast falsely claiming Towa is the culprit behind the attack, having been swindled by Eiji.
8	"Towa Yorumi's Descent"; Transliteration: "Yorumi Towa Descent" (Japanese: 夜海トワ Descent)	Kou-kun	Masaki Tsuzuki	Hiroki Hayashi	August 23, 2026
As Shiina and Towa are shocked by each other's true identities, the other Diaboli Slayer members arrive and inform Towa that the police have branded her a criminal. Despite Shiina's attempts to reason with her, Towa tries to steal her Diaboli powers, but fails when Shiina resists. Towa then ends their friendship before fleeing with the rest of Diaboli Slayer. Concurrently, deducing that the police are corrupt, EXCEEDS concludes they must take Diaboli Slayer into protective custody before things get worse. Later, to avoid endangering them further, Towa subdues the other Diaboli Slayer members and absorbs their mutations, transforming them back into ordinary humans, before turning herself in to the police; aware that this is a trap designed by Mana and Eiji to capture her, Towa intends to take advantage of it to draw them out. In response, not wanting Towa to do something so dangerous, but no longer able to fight without their powers, the other Diaboli Slayer members turn to EXCEEDS for help and hand themselves over. Meanwhile, Mana has already started heading toward the police station to retrieve Towa.
9	"EXCEEDS"; Transliteration: "EXCEEDS" (Japanese: EXCEEDS)	Mitsumoto Kitamura	Masaki Tsuzuki	Yuki Ogawa	August 30, 2026
Mana arrived at the police station where Towa is stationed. While that is happening the Diaboli Slayers turn themselves into EXCEEDS and ask them to save Towa. Hayate apologize that they couldn't help deal with the Diaboli drugs but they can strive for a better future. She asked what are the backgrounds of the Diaboli Slayers. They first start with Towa background where she was a child who was experimented by Mana and Eiji in a research drug facility. Diaboli Slayers believe Mana and Eiji caused the terrorist attack at the park and said the senior police officers purchase the Diaboli drug. Back to Towa background, she was discarded by Mana and Eiji. However a couple adopted her and she lived a happy life. Then 4 years ago, a terrorist used a flame Diaboli to attack the airport which killed her adoptive parents. She vowed to kill every person who has a selfish desire to become a Diaboli and exterminate the drug trade which includes Mana and Eiji. The other members of the Diaboli Slayers also revealed their past and begged them to save Towa because Towa took their power away and also revealed she had a happy life with Shiina. One of the Diaboli Slayers gave EXCEEDS the special grade Diaboli drug to investigate. Hayate asks for an interview with Towa. At the police station, Mana and Towa fight but Towa loses and used one of her Diaboli Slayers comrade power to leave a spider at the cell after she was taken to Mana's drug facility. When EXCEEDS arrived at the police station they told she was moved to a safer facility which Hayate knew it was lie. The Diaboli slayers found the spider Towa left. Back to Mana facility, she began washing herself and heard a big explosion and heard the drug facility is being attacked by EXCEEDS.
10	"South Pole Underground Research Lab & Search and Destroy Mission"; Transliteration: "Nankyoku Chika Kenkyūjo Sōsaku Senmetsu-sen" (Japanese: 南極地下研究所・捜索殲滅戦)	Kazunobu Fuseki	Masaki Tsuzuki	Kazunobu Fuseki	September 6, 2026
EXCEEDS forces assault Mana's laboratory. Mana complains to Eiji, who tells her to leave. Her minions are killed or captured. Recognizing defeat, Mana orders the "plant" Progenitor Zero moved. Thanks to the Diaboli spider, Towa restores the stolen powers to the Diaboli Slayers, who join Shiina in searching for Towa. Meanwhile, Towa arrives at Mana's command center. Despite her prior defeat, she resolves to sacrifice herself to take Mana down. Mana demonstrates that Towa remains outmatched and mocks her motive of revenge. Before Mana can strangle Towa, Yuuna grabs Mana's head and punches her, sending the surprised Mana flying across the room without real damage. After Yuzu fires rockets from an armored vehicle at Mana, the girls free Towa. Elsewhere, Fate finds the captive children. One begs her to flee as the blob Diaboli with the consumed humans approaches. In ten seconds, Fate erects a barrier around the monster and slays it, then frees the children. At the location where the giant Progenitor Zero is planted, Nanoha fires an obliteration attack on it. Meanwhile, Mana stands over the bodies of the defeated Diaboli Slayers, with only an exhausted Towa remaining.
11	"The Diaboli, Mana Shinomiya"; Transliteration: "Majin Shinomiya Mana" (Japanese: 魔人・篠宮マナ)	Hisoka Maejima	Masaki Tsuzuki	Miyuki Takahashi	September 13, 2026
Mana recalls surviving a meteor crash on her research base when Progenitor X merged with her, enabling her to slaughter the Diaboli that consumed everyone. She found and planted Progenitor Zero to grow stronger, until the flame Progenitor Setsuna fought her, causing massive destruction. In the present, Mana again demonstrates Towa cannot win and runs metal tentacles through each Diaboli Slayer twice. Towa fails to behead Mana, but Shiina bursts in, blasts Mana away, and binds her while freeing the girls. Mana realizes Shiina has Setsuna's powers and offers a deal; rejected, she consumes Diaboli drugs to transform, yet Shiina still punches her through multiple stories to the surface, where they fight fiercely. Elsewhere, Hayate and EXCEEDS troops take Eiji into custody, while Fate and Nanoha defeat Progenitor Zero. Shiina finds consuming Mana's life force draining her, and a piece of Mana tries to consume the unconscious Shiina, but Towa intervenes. Shiina wakes to warn that Mana is still alive.
12	"The Flame Connecting Me to You" (Japanese: 君と繋ぐ炎)	Norihiko Sutō	Masaki Tsuzuki	Takayuki Hamana	September 20, 2026
Hayate questions Eiji about Mana, but he refuses to betray her despite knowing she is evil. Meanwhile, as Fate and Nanoha mop up what they believe is Progenitor Zero, Towa and Shiina pursue Mana. Unable to regenerate, Mana connects to the real Progenitor Zero's sapling, but the process reverses and kills her as she cries for Eiji. Arriving where Progenitor Zero has grown enormous, Shiina recalls Setsuna's confrontation with Mana. Towa knows Mana is dead, absorbed into Progenitor Zero. Using Shiina's power, they force it underground. Fate and Nanoha handle surface tendrils while Shiina and Towa go below, where Shiina burns out Setsuna's power to obliterate Progenitor Zero. Shiina enters a dream world where Setsuna is alive; she says goodbye before waking. Towa shared the dream. EXCEEDS shuts down South Pole operations. Eiji apparently commits suicide in prison without revealing more about Mana. The Diaboli Slayers move in with Shiina at her island compound. Nanoha and Fate go to their next operation, but need Shiina, Towa, and the Diaboli Slayers to deal with a Kaiju Dragon.
