= BanG Dream! It's MyGO!!!!! =

Japanese anime television series

- Key visual featuring the members of MyGO!!!!!. From left to right: Rāna Kaname, Soyo Nagasaki, Tomori Takamatsu (center), Anon Chihaya, and Taki Shiina
- Genre: Drama
- Created by: Bushiroad
- Anime television series
- Directed by: Kōdai Kakimoto
- Written by: Yuniko Ayana
- Music by: Elements Garden
- Studio: Sanzigen
- Licensed by: Crunchyroll; SEA: Muse Communication
- Original network: Tokyo MX, KBS, SUN, BS NTV, TV Aichi, SBS, HTB, AT-X
- Original run: June 29, 2023 – September 14, 2023
- Episodes: 13
- Manga

BanG Dream! It's MyGO!!!!! Swaying in the Rain, Looking for the Sunshine
- Written by: Yuama; Yotsuji Haibuchi (story)
- Published by: Bushiroad
- Magazine: Comic Growl
- Original run: December 27, 2024 – present
- Volumes: 3
- Anime television series

BanG Dream! MyGO!!!!! // Ave Mujica
- Original network: NNS (Nippon TV)
- Original run: January 8, 2027 – scheduled
- icon

BanG Dream! It's MyGO!!!!! is a Japanese anime television series created by Bushiroad and produced by Sanzigen. It is a spin-off of the main BanG Dream! anime series, serving as its chronological sequel. The series aired from June to September 2023. Two compilation films recapping the events of the series with some additional scenes were released in September and November 2024. A manga adaptation written and illustrated by Yuama with story by Yotsuji Haibuchi, titled BanG Dream! It's MyGO!!!!! Swaying in the Rain, Looking for the Sunshine, has been serialized in Bushiroad's magazine Comic Growl since December 2024.

The series received generally positive reviews. Critics and fans have praised It's MyGO!!!!! for its plot, role design, visuals, and depiction of interpersonal relations and mood disorder as well as its unconventional approach to the realm of music anime. It was later followed by the sequels BanG Dream! Ave Mujica in 2025, and BanG Dream! MyGO!!!!! // Ave Mujica in 2027.

== Premise ==
The series follows the formation of the titular band MyGO!!!!!, one of two bands, along with Ave Mujica, that were founded following the breakup of the band Crychic. Haneoka Girls' Academy student Tomori Takamatsu is approached by recent transferee Anon Chihaya, who aims to recruit her in building a band upon seeing most of the school being in bands. Tomori hesitates to accept her invite as Anon learns and becomes involved in the drama of Tomori's former band alongside Tomori's bandmates Soyo Nagasaki and Taki Shiina and outsider Rāna Kaname that threatens the growth of their fledgling band.

== Characters ==
=== MyGO!!!!! ===
Tomori Takamatsu (高松 燈, Takamatsu Tomori)
Voiced by: Hina Yōmiya
A first-year at Haneoka Girls' Academy, she often sees things differently from others and has trouble making friends. Despite her introverted nature, she deeply cares for her friends and bandmates and accepts them for who they are despite their flaws. She was part of the all-girls band Crychic with four others, where she was the vocalist. Following the band's hostile breakup during middle school, she once again became reclusive and hesitant to join bands. She later joins the band, later named MyGO!!!!!, led by Anon, and sees it as a second chance to overcome her trauma from Crychic's breakup. Tomori also has many quirky habits, including collecting objects she finds aesthetically pleasing, such as rocks, notebooks, and bandages featuring animal designs, and arranging objects neatly.
Director Kōdai Kakimoto said he wanted to depict Tomori as a "punk band vocalist" and embody punk itself through her character's inability to get along with people in daily life, making her a manifestation of miscommunication.
Anon Chihaya (千早 愛音, Chihaya Anon)
Voiced by: Rin Tateishi
A first-year at Haneoka Girls' Academy who recently transferred in after studying abroad in England. She can be proactive, trendy, does well academically, and while she was popular in her middle school, she distances herself from how she acted back then. She leads the effort to create a band, later named MyGO!!!!!, to become popular after seeing much of Haneoka's student body being part of bands despite overstating her own skills at guitar and eventually convinces Soyo, Taki, Tomori, and Rāna to join, and becoming the rhythm guitarist of the band.
According to writer Yuniko Ayana, Anon was chosen as the point-of-view character for the beginning of the series so as to more easily introduce the audience to Tomori and the inciting incident of Crychic's breakup without overwhelming the audience with such a complex and emotionally heavy plot point at the beginning of the story.
Rāna Kaname (要 楽奈, Kaname Rāna)
Voiced by: Hina Aoki
A student at Hanasakigawa Girls' Academy, in her third year of middle school, she is eccentric, appears frequently at the live music venue RiNG, has impressive skills at playing the guitar, and is clear about what she dislikes and likes. She later joins the band MyGO!!!!! as its lead guitarist, though she acts on her own accord and appears at the band's practice sessions infrequently. It is later revealed that she is Shifune Tsuzuki's granddaughter, and she aspired to join a band to find somewhere she can belong after the closing of Space.
Ayana stated that Rāna's character and her connection to Space was conceptualized early in the development of It's MyGO!!!!!, as the story was initially planned to be set between the events of the first and second seasons of the anime series.
Soyo Nagasaki (長崎 そよ, Nagasaki Soyo)
Voiced by: Mika Kohinata
A first-year at Tsukinomori Girls' Academy who plays the double bass in the school's brass band club. She has a reputation for being kind to others, and was previously the bassist for Crychic. She is friends with Mutsumi, and she regularly updates her on the wellbeing of their former bandmates following the band's breakup. Underneath her calm facade, she attempts to reform Crychic through convincing Sakiko and Mutsumi to rejoin. She later joins the band MyGO!!!!! in order to achieve her goal.
Kakimoto said that the production team set her character's keyword as the "mother of the group". This not only stems from her gentle personality but is also related to her complicated family background.
Taki Shiina (椎名 立希, Shiina Taki)
Voiced by: Coco Hayashi
A first-year at Hanasakigawa Girls' Academy, she works part-time at RiNG and likes being alone, causing her to be antisocial and abrasive towards others, especially Anon. Despite this, she is caring and is good friends with Tomori, whom she is highly protective of following Crychic's breakup and looks up to with admiration, and she has an older sister. She was formerly the drummer for Crychic, and later joins the band MyGO!!!!!.
Ayana said that the motive of designing Taki was to emphasize Tomori's amazing talent as a genius lyricist. Kakimoto stated that the relationship between Taki, Anon, and Tomori is one of the key focuses in the anime's creation.

=== Other characters ===
Sakiko Togawa (豊川 祥子, Togawa Sakiko)
Voiced by: Kanon Takao
A first-year at Haneoka Girls' Academy, who often plays piano at the school's music room. She was formerly the keyboardist for the band Crychic, which consisted of herself, Mutsumi, Tomori, Soyo, and Taki. However, she quit the band for unknown reasons, which led to her friendships with Tomori, Soyo, and Taki becoming strained. She later forms and becomes band leader for Ave Mujica, which is introduced at the end of the series, and takes on the alter-ego "Oblivionis".
Mutsumi Wakaba (若葉 睦, Wakaba Mutsumi)
Voiced by: Yuzuki Watase
A student at Tsukinomori Girls' Academy and formerly part of Crychic, where she played guitar, who is bad at expressing how she feels. She is friends with Soyo and Sakiko, and she tends to act as their intermediary regarding their individual motives. She later joins the band Ave Mujica and takes on the alter-ego "Mortis."
Umiri Yahata (八幡 海鈴, Yahata Umiri)
Voiced by: Mei Okada
A first-year at Hanasakigawa Girls' Academy who is skilled at playing bass and participates in a large number of bands. She is a friend of Taki and they engage in friendly banter regarding their respective bands. She later joins the band Ave Mujica, using the alter-ego "Timoris." Yuniko Ayana stated in an interview that Umiri's character was inspired by a social media post she had seen from a real life teenage bass player, who claimed that they were at one point been a member of ten bands simultaneously.
Uika Misumi (三角 初華, Misumi Uika)
Voiced by: Rico Sasaki
A first-year at Hanasakigawa Girls' Academy and classmate of Taki and Umiri, who is the vocalist and guitarist in an idol unit called sumimi. She is childhood friends with Sakiko and later joins her band Ave Mujica, using the alter-ego "Doloris."
Nyamu Yūtenji (祐天寺 にゃむ, Yūtenji Nyamu)
Voiced by: Akane Yonezawa
An online influencer who Anon frequently watches. Nicknamed "Nyamuchi," she mainly posts videos about beauty and make-up, and is later shown to be skilled at playing drums. She later joins the band Ave Mujica and takes on the alter-ego "Amoris."
Mana Sumita (純田 まな, Sumita Mana)
Voiced by: Hazuki Tanda
The vocalist and bandmate of Uika in the idol unit sumimi.

== Production ==
=== Planning ===
After producing the 3rd season of the main BanG Dream! series, the production team developed the idea to "portray characters more realistically" and "depict irreversible major events in the storyline". Subsequently, Bushiroad producer Yuki Nemoto conceived a "serious-themed band project" originating from the idea of "debut a melodic hardcore band and a metal band". When the script reached approximately episode 4 during development, Bushiroad decided to integrate this project into the existing BanG Dream! universe. This decision led the production team to pause scriptwriting and overhaul character designs and story settings. The original plan of telling a 26-episode story about two bands with a total of 10 members was restructured into two seasons separately focuses on different bands. Ultimately, the production team decided to allocate the core narrative to two anime series, It's MyGO!!!!! and Ave Mujica, clearly delineating the narrative trajectories of the two bands.

=== Writing ===
According to lead writer Yuniko Ayana, the choice to make It's MyGO!!!!! a more tonally serious drama came at the request of Yuki Nemoto. Nemoto said he hopes It's MyGO!!!!! will be a work resonating with the younger generation, portraying the genuine, laughter-and-tears-filled interpersonal relationships among high school students. Given the lighter tone of previous BanG Dream! installments, Ayana initially struggled with balancing this heavy-toned direction with the desire to not alienate fans of earlier installments, but series director Kōdai Kakimoto encouraged her to give it her all. Ayana drew on her past personal experiences with "betrayal and distrust", which provided the impetus for Tomori's emotional conflict within the series narrative. To prepare for writing the series, Ayana did research into real-life bands of high school girls, which informed some of the story and characters. Ayana stated that she felt It's MyGO!!!!! was the most realistic work she had written thus far, even including her works outside of the BanG Dream! franchise.

According to Kakimoto, the script for It's MyGO!!!!! underwent multiple drastic overhauls. Initially, the story direction was based on character settings, but the actual writing process revealed the characters' multifaceted personalities, triggering chain reactions, such as altered motivations, reconstructed relationships, and interwoven plotlines. Each adjustment required rebuilding subsequent developments and retconning scripts already in progress, resulting in some episodes being rewritten up to five or six times. For example, the initial concept portrayed Anon Chihaya as a "bold-acting returnee student beneath a model-student facade", but to differentiate her from other BanG Dream! characters like Rokka Asahi, her flaws such as "trend-chasing vanity" and "calculating nature" were amplified to "deepen human authenticity". He further stated that before merging into the series, all characters had more sharp-edged personalities than the current versions, and they had considered ending the story with the band's dissolution. After being incorporated into the project, the overseers granted them "complete creative freedom" to develop original storylines. After revising "overly realistic elements", they established the framework that first season focusing on MyGO!!!!! and second season centering on Ave Mujica. In order to better integrate this series into the BanG Dream! project, the writing staff made the decision to assign the characters to existing schools in the BanG Dream! universe, and created their interaction with the previous BanG Dream! characters.

To design Tomori's notebook and style of writing, the production team referenced numerous lyricists' poetry collections, along with the doodles and handwritten notes found within them. Writer Midori Gotō created Tomori's monologues and poems in Episode 10.

=== Animation ===
According to Kakimoto, the animation was almost entirely produced in-house at Sanzigen, and every animator worked on multiple episodes. The creative team also entrusted Sanzigen's animators with handling both the storyboards and directing. Studio president Hiroaki Matsuura pointed out how the series fuses CG and hand-drawn techniques. While most of the visual elements were produced as CG, Sanzigen's animation team added many hand-drawn details such as refined hair, eyes, and shadows, particularly for close-up shots.

Writer Yuniko Ayana said that the third episode of the series, presented from Tomori's first-person perspective, was fun to write. The episode was praised by critics for its unique visual presentation.

Matsuura said that Episode 3, which is entirely presented as a long take showing Tomori's point-of-view, was inspired by a particular artist's live footage and that he specifically requested for the episode to imitate its feel. To write the episode's script, Ayana watched the film Being John Malkovich so as to understand how to best write a story presented from a first-person perspective. Because Tomori herself was not visible for most of the episode, with her presence primarily being conveyed through her spoken dialogue and the occasional use of her reflection in mirrors, Ayana had to consider how to best tell the story with the visuals of what she witnesses, which she described as a novel challenge. She also noted that the infrequent use of mirrors in the episode expressed the nature of Tomori's character, as she would rarely look at her own reflection.

The fixed camera shots in episode 7, which followed MyGO!!!!!'s movements in the dressing room prior to their first concert, were also given particular attention, and Ayana watched the hidden camera television program Human Observation Show: Monitoring to inform how to write for these scenes. Matsuura explained that in the wide shots, the characters were always moving, which he said was not standard for other anime but made the scenes feel more believable. Kakimoto agreed that the fixed camera system better captured the band's natural interactions with one another, as opposed to following them closely as they might in a documentary context. He hoped the audience to feel as if they were MyGO!!!!!'s live staff or one of the members. To inform the animation of certain scenes, the writers and animators sometimes acted out the story's events during meetings. In particular, Ayana acted out how she had envisioned Soyo's movements during the ending of the eighth episode, when Soyo begs Sakiko to reform Crychic; one of her co-writers acted as Sakiko during the demonstration.

The live concert scenes of the anime were all recorded by real musicians, including Daisuke Hasegawa, the guitarist for Aqua Timez, and Ryuhei Kinoshita. For the scene where Anon Chihaya makes a mistake during a performance, Hasegawa intentionally hit the wrong strings, and recorded close-up footage of the hand movements, which was then provided to Sanzigen as reference material. Storyboard artist Tomomi Umetsu enriched the live performance scene in episode 10, while animators improvised the members' expressions and acting nuances under the guidance by CG director Daichi Omori and Motomu Endō.

== Themes and analysis ==
In a departure from the main BanG Dream! series, It's MyGO!!!!! focuses on organic drama and interpersonal strife. Kakimoto said this work delves into more serious storytelling such as people's gloomy emotions, conflicts, and tangled relationships. He stated that this work breaks away from the framework of previous series' animations where "characters formed a group together because they like each other". He additionally said that It's MyGO!!!!! is a story about characters no longer hiding the flaws and shame they once tried to cover up, and still seeking connections with others in spite of their emotional wounds. Nemoto explained that precisely in a social climate where people easily compare themselves to others through social media and the Internet, he believed depicting struggles and vivid human nature could create a work with stronger emotional resonance. Taki Shiina's voice actress Coco Hayashi mentioned that one of the core themes of It's MyGO!!!!! is "finding a place to belong". According to Anime Feminist, the series touches upon content such as depression, anxiety, shyness, asociality, stalking, parental abuse, effects of divorce, and feeling of alienation by microaggressions. Animate Times pointed out in an anime guide that the series depicts a messy human drama that fully emphasizes discord among members and the self-righteous behavior of the characters, causing the anime to be sometimes called a "depression anime" due to this storytelling style.

Masaki Endō from Oricon News pointed out the anime stands out among band-themed anime by depicting the anguish of lacking excitement and the frustration of youth through delicate emotions and presenting strained relationships akin to the real world. He believed that this approach reflected recent trends of works centering on communication-challenged protagonists, after series such as Komi Can't Communicate and Bocchi the Rock! gained audience acceptance. Natalie writer Shouki Ōta described "girls expressing their emotions" as the central narrative element of the anime. He thought It's MyGO!!!!! centers on two elements, including the intertwining feelings that await at the end of intertwined human relationships, and the self-consciousness that is unique to adolescence, while the series depicts these two elements through the two themes of girls' high school and girl band.

Yuki Kawano of Japanese online magazine DenFaminicoGamer interpreted the character Anon Chihaya as a metaphor for modern people. He described the character as "cheerful on surface, yet only concerned with herself and unwilling to exert effort". He also characterized the series as having an emotionally heavy style, saying it depicts the intricacies of human relationships and the character's pain with "more realism than actual reality", similar to Japanese daytime drama and Korean drama. Leyvan, another reviewer for DenFaminicoGamer noticed the "textbook-like efficacy of human relationships" depicted in It's MyGO!!!!!. He suggested that the development of social media and other technologies in the 2010s, coupled with the COVID-19 pandemic, has led to the younger generation's failure to cultivate interpersonal communication and social skills during adolescence, and that It's MyGO!!!!! reflected these anxieties and "mirrors the era". Further, he said the series' depiction of shared emotional trauma can be interpreted in countless ways depending on the viewer by projecting their own life experiences or current circumstances onto these elements.

== Media ==
=== Anime ===
An anime television series centered around MyGO!!!!! that serves as the spin-off and chronological sequel to the main series was announced on April 9, 2023, during the band's 4th concert. It is produced by Sanzigen and directed by Kōdai Kakimoto, with Yuniko Ayana writing and supervising series scripts. It premiered on June 29, 2023, with three episodes premiering on the same day, and aired until September 14, 2023, on Tokyo MX and other networks. The opening theme is "One Droplet" (壱雫空, Hitoshizuku), while the ending theme is "Bookmark" (栞, Shiori), both performed by the eponymous band. Crunchyroll streamed the series. Muse Communication licensed the series in Southeast Asia.

==== Episodes ====
No.	Title	Directed by	Written by	Storyboarded by	Original release date
1	"Haneoka's Quirky Girl"; Transliteration: "Haneoka no Fushigi-chan" (Japanese: 羽丘の不思議ちゃん)	Motomu Endō	Yuniko Ayana	Kōdai Kakimoto	June 29, 2023
Anon Chihaya transfers to Haneoka Girls' Academy late into spring. Realizing that almost everyone at school is in a band due to Haneoka's senior students and alumni being members of popular bands, she hurriedly begins building her own. Anon overhears a piano performance by student Sakiko Togawa and proposes forming a band with her, but Sakiko declines. Meanwhile, Soyo Nagasaki, a student from Tsukinomori Girls' Academy, seeks to contact Sakiko through Mutsumi Wakaba, a classmate of hers and childhood friend of Sakiko, but Mutsumi is evasive. Back at Haneoka, Anon hopes to befriend her classmate Tomori Takamatsu after being informed of her past in a band and reading her notebooks of lyrics. Tomori hesitates due to the hostile nature of her previous band's breakup, and Anon reassures her she can try again. Hearing this, Tomori asks Anon if she would join a band for her whole life. Anon is bemused by the notion, and Tomori, embarrassed, runs away. Anon chases her to a live house, RiNG, to apologize where she is stopped by part-time employee and Tomori's friend Taki Shiina, who is angered at Anon's attempt to recruit Tomori to a band.
2	"I Won't Invite You Anymore"; Transliteration: "Mō Sasowanai" (Japanese: もう誘わない)	Motomu Endō	Midori Gotō	Tomomi Umetsu	June 29, 2023
While trying to recruit band members at RiNG, Anon encounters Soyo, who witnessed her confrontation with Taki. The two talk at RiNG's café where Taki begrudgingly serves them, while a girl named Rāna Kaname appears for an open mic and begins playing the guitar over their conversation. Anon mentions approaching Tomori about the band, catching Soyo's interest as a former bandmate of hers. Inferring that Anon and Tomori are connected through both attending Haneoka, Soyo agrees to join Anon's band, with the intention of reconnecting with Tomori through her. Anon, oblivious to Soyo's true goals, is delighted. Meanwhile, Sakiko meets and urges Mutsumi to conceal her whereabouts from Soyo. Anon learns during a visit to RiNG that Taki was also in Soyo and Tomori's old band, Crychic. After noticing Soyo and Taki react dejectedly to their band's past, Anon meets with Tomori to ask about her involvement in Crychic.
3	"Crychic"	Daichi Ōmori & Hajime Yamanokuchi	Yuniko Ayana	Kōdai Kakimoto	June 29, 2023
In an episode told exclusively from Tomori's first-person point of view, she recalls her past. Much of her youth and middle school life had been spent alone and she wrote her thoughts in her notebook. While reaching over a bridge for a flower, she was tackled by Sakiko, who mistook her action as a suicide attempt. The two befriended one another, and Sakiko took a liking to Tomori's writing and turned it into a composition. Sakiko then suggested forming a band with her classmates Soyo and Mutsumi, with Taki later joining, and the group began to bond. Sakiko's optimistic nature motivated Tomori as the lyricist and vocalist, culminating in a successful debut show for Crychic with their song "Haruhikage" (春日影; lit. "Spring Sunlight"). However, the group saw a social media comment about the concert criticizing Tomori's singing, which demoralized her. Sakiko later abruptly quit the band without explanation which led to an argument between the members, and Mutsumi expressed that she never enjoyed being in Crychic. The band then split up, and a heartbroken Tomori closed herself off upon entering Haneoka and seeing Sakiko distance herself.
4	"For Our Whole Lives?!"; Transliteration: "Isshō da yo!?" (Japanese: 一生だよ！？)	Kōichirō Koga	Hitomi Ogawa	Shouko Hayashi	July 6, 2023
After hearing Tomori's story, Anon encourages her to try again. Soyo arrives and supports Anon's comments, but Tomori is unconvinced and flees. Soyo and Anon discuss the issue, and Anon reveals that Sakiko has transferred from Tsukinomori to Haneoka. Soyo thus goes to Haneoka and approaches Sakiko in an attempt to reconcile, but Sakiko refuses to speak with her. Anon calls Soyo and Tomori to RiNG and pushes them to discuss the issue with Taki. While Taki blames Sakiko for quitting, Tomori, remembering the negative online comment, claims her singing was at fault. Soyo maintains that no one is to blame for Crychic's breakup, and Tomori decides to commit after learning that Taki is not angry with her. Soyo suggests reforming the band, promising to stay together and talk out any future issues. Although Anon is uncertain of her commitment, everyone agrees to prepare for a show, while Rāna watches with interest. At their first practice, Anon admits to having limited guitar experience before Rāna appears. Elsewhere, sumimi vocalist and guitarist Uika Misumi gazes at Sakiko's messages longingly after recording a song.
5	"I'm Not Running Away!"; Transliteration: "Nigetenai!" (Japanese: 逃げてない！)	Daichi Ōmori	Akiko Waba	Hiroshi Morita	July 13, 2023
Rāna plays "Haruhikage" proficiently despite no prior familiarity and expresses interest in joining them. The band is impressed with her skill, though Anon is distressed at Rāna possibly overshadowing her. The band is invited to fill a vacant slot and perform at Poppin'Party and Afterglow's joint show at RiNG, but Tomori hesitates because of her prior trauma. Taki and Anon argue over whether they should play until Taki criticizes Anon's poor work ethic and attempts to use Tomori's hesitation to stall for time. Offended, Anon runs away and encounters her former middle school classmates, who are confused to see her in Haneoka's school uniform, as they had heard she was studying abroad. Anon panics, but Tomori catches up to her and they go to an aquarium. Anon admits that she had studied in England after graduating, but returned to Japan after experiencing culture shock, and that she feels ashamed of having run away. Tomori reassures Anon that running from her fears is natural and another means to find her calling, as Tomori had done before joining Anon's band. With their bond strengthened, they return to Soyo and Taki and declare their commitment to perform in the show.
6	"Why, When It's Too Late"; Transliteration: "Nande Imasara" (Japanese: なんで今更)	Kōichirō Koga	Midori Gotō	Kozue Oka	July 20, 2023
While the band discusses what song to play at the show, Taki suggests "Haruhikage", but Soyo expresses reluctance. Tomori showcases new lyrics to the band, motivating Taki to produce a composition for them. However, Anon struggles to play it while Rāna does so with ease, prompting Taki to recruit Rāna to the band. Unsatisfied with the lack of progress, Taki relegates Anon to practicing basic chords and Anon improves over time, while Rāna's inconsistent appearances at practices prevent the band from operating cohesively. Meanwhile, Soyo tells Mutsumi that she intends to reform Crychic, and invites Mutsumi to join after the show at RiNG. Mutsumi refuses and informs Sakiko, who then plans on attending the show in order to confront Soyo. Taki's frustrations boil over as a byproduct of overworking herself while trying to mimic Sakiko's band leadership and composition skills, and she begins skipping practice. Anon and Tomori visit and confront Taki at Hanasakigawa about her absence. As the girls temporarily reconcile, they encounter Rāna, who they learn is a Hanasakigawa junior high school student.
7	"Even After Today's Concert Ends"; Transliteration: "Kyō no Raibu ga Owatte mo" (Japanese: 今日のライブが終わっても)	Tomomi Umetsu	Yuniko Ayana	Tomomi Umetsu	July 27, 2023
The day of the band's debut show arrives, but they struggle through a sound check and nervously wait their turn to perform. Once on stage, they also struggle through their opening song as Tomori suffers from stage fright and sings poorly, but she starts to sing with more confidence after seeing Sakiko and Mutsumi in the audience. As part of her emceeing between songs, Tomori confesses her fears about performing in a band again after Crychic's breakup but aspires to continue expressing her feelings through music. Rāna uses the opportunity to segue into "Haruhikage", catching Soyo and Sakiko off-guard and the band follows along. Hurt by its performance, Sakiko tearfully flees RiNG, which Soyo notices, to her despair. Although Taki, Tomori, and Anon celebrate their debut as a success, Soyo angrily confronts them about playing the song. After fleeing from RiNG, an anguished Sakiko calls Uika during her work and asks her for a favor to "make her forget everything".
8	"Why"; Transliteration: "Dōshite" (Japanese: どうして)	Kōichirō Koga	Hitomi Ogawa	Hiroshi Morita	August 3, 2023
Soyo points out how Sakiko cried and walked out during their performance of "Haruhikage", believing it disrupted her plan to reform Crychic. Taki dismissively remarks that Sakiko is no longer part of the band. Offended, Soyo skips practice. Blaming herself for the conflict, Tomori looks for Soyo at Tsukinomori to apologize, but learns she has not been attending school. Taki, Tomori, and Anon argue over how or if to proceed without Soyo, and Rāna, frustrated with the situation, leaves the band. Meanwhile, Sakiko reunites and reminisces with Uika on their childhood. Uika comments that she attended Crychic's concert, though Sakiko abruptly changes the subject to discuss an important topic. Soyo attempts to text Sakiko but finds that she has been blocked. Soyo coaxes Mutsumi to help meet Sakiko by guilt tripping Mutsumi into feeling responsible for Crychic's breakup. Mutsumi arranges a meeting, and Soyo apologizes for performing "Haruhikage" and pleads for Sakiko to reform Crychic with her. Sakiko rejects her offer, criticizing it as rash and ignorant of the other Crychic members' personal agency. She further calls out Soyo's selfishness and attachment to the past, before leaving her behind.
9	"Disbanding"; Transliteration: "Kaisan" (Japanese: 解散)	Motomu Endō	Akiko Waba	Naoya Okugawa	August 10, 2023
Soyo recounts moving to a new penthouse condo with her mother, who was often absent in her youth following her parents' divorce. She later became the double bass player of Tsukinomori's brass band and her performance attracted Sakiko's interest, paving the path to the formation of Crychic. Distraught about Crychic's breakup and Sakiko's words, Soyo reasons that her actions have been selfless. Anon, Taki, and Tomori try to reach out to Soyo but are repeatedly ignored. Taki intercepts Soyo at a brass band event, where Soyo reveals that she planned to discard Anon and Rāna after reforming Crychic and her promise to Tomori was a lie to keep her and Taki from leaving. Furious, Taki unilaterally elects to replace Soyo as the band's bassist, recruiting her classmate and support musician Umiri Yahata. Anon and Tomori are displeased with the change, and Umiri quickly leaves upon noticing their discontent. Taki explains Soyo's intentions and betrayal to Anon and Tomori, shocking them. Upset at having been used by Soyo and believing she is unwanted, Anon quits the band, devastating Tomori.
10	"Always Lost"; Transliteration: "Zutto Maigo" (Japanese: ずっと迷子)	Tomomi Umetsu	Midori Gotō	Tomomi Umetsu	August 17, 2023
With the band fragmented and Taki and Anon both avoiding her, Tomori writes down her troubles in her notebook. Tomori encounters Uika by chance at the Sunshine City planetarium, and shares her writings. Recognizing her as Sakiko's bandmate, Uika encourages Tomori to express her feelings using her writings. Tomori conducts solo spoken word performances at RiNG, which become popular as an intrigued Rāna joins as musical support. At Rāna's urging, Taki also joins and reconciles with Tomori. Mutsumi tells Taki and Tomori that Soyo is depressed following her failure to reform Crychic. Tomori persuades Anon to return and relays Mutsumi's tip about Soyo, as Anon confesses she started the band to make herself look good. Anon then implores Soyo to rejoin while empathizing with her selfish motives. Soyo declares that she will come to Tomori's next performance to break up the band. At the show, Tomori sees Soyo in the audience and drags her up onstage. The reunited band performs Tomori's poem and improvises a song. Tomori sings her desire to reach out to her bandmates in spite of their conflicts, moving all its members except a delighted Rāna to tears.
11	"Even So"; Transliteration: "Soredemo" (Japanese: それでも)	Kōichirō Koga	Hitomi Ogawa	Hiroshi Morita	August 24, 2023
Following the show, Soyo makes amends with the band. They are suddenly notified of their next show as reserved by Tomori during her performances, so they begin preparing despite not yet having a band name or new song written. The five convene at Soyo's penthouse to brainstorm and produce the new song, and they begin to form genuine bonds after learning of their individual flaws. While the band finalizes the song and costumes the night before the show at Anon's house, Rāna opens up about her aspiration of finding somewhere to belong after the closing of Space. Tomori interprets Rāna's aspirations as continuing on as a band and acknowledges that they will feel lost and hurt along the way. Anon, inspired by her interpretation and using one of her notes, suggests calling themselves "Maigo no Band" (迷子のバンド; lit. "The Band of Lost Children").
12	"It's my go!!!!!"	Shouko Hayashi	Akiko Waba	Daichi Ōmori	August 31, 2023
Before the band goes on stage, Anon learns their band name has been shortened into "Maigo". Reiterating how the band feels lost, Anon gains an idea and coins their final name by turning the phrase "itsumo maigo" (いつも迷子; lit. "always lost") into "It's My Go". The band then proudly performs their set, as Mutsumi and Umiri watch on; after the show, the band agrees to use the name MyGO!!!!! with five exclamation marks to symbolize each member. When MyGO!!!!! notices a bag of cucumbers left in their dressing room, Soyo tracks down Mutsumi to return and reject the gift, despite Mutsumi showing support for Soyo staying with MyGO!!!!!. Mutsumi quietly meets with Umiri, who urges her to take her time to consider a major decision. Sometime later, Sakiko meets with beauty influencer Nyamu Yūtenji upon being notified of her online popularity and drumming. Sakiko recruits Nyamu to her new band by convincing her of Mutsumi and Uika's involvement and asks her to entrust her life to Sakiko.
13	"The Only One I Can Trust Is Myself"; Transliteration: "Shinjirareru no ha Waga Mi Hitotsu" (Japanese: 信じられるのは我が身ひとつ)	Hajime Yamanokuchi	Yuniko Ayana	Naoya Okugawa	September 14, 2023
Sakiko visits Mutsumi about recruiting her for her band and Mutsumi immediately accepts due to her concern for Sakiko's mental state. Meanwhile, MyGO!!!!! celebrates their newfound success and believes they can participate in band activities for a lifetime. Soyo privately admits to Tomori that she felt uncomfortable with her lyrics as they resonated with her insecurities, concluding that she can now be able to face them with MyGO!!!!!. Hearing this, Tomori tries to reconcile with Sakiko, but Sakiko rebukes and bitterly wishes her happiness before leaving. Tomori encounters Uika again with Anon at the planetarium and Tomori thanks her for her advice; Anon points out how Uika knew her despite Tomori not introducing herself. Uika leaves ahead of Tomori and Anon and travels to a theater, where Sakiko conducts final preparations and urges Nyamu to not record their band activity, much to the latter's annoyance. Sakiko leads Uika, Mutsumi, Umiri, and Nyamu to their band's first concert, concealing their identities and debuting as Ave Mujica. After its success, Sakiko splits from the band and returns to a disheveled home with her alcoholic father.

=== Compilation film ===
On January 6, 2024, it was announced that the anime would be made into a compilation film split into two parts with new footage that aims to add focus on band member Rāna Kaname, revealing the two parts would be titled "Spring Sunshine, Lost Cat" (春の陽だまり、迷い猫, Haru no Hidamari, Mayoi Neko) and "Sing, Songs That Become Us & FILM LIVE" (うたう、僕らになれるうた & FILM LIVE, Utau, Bokura ni Nareru Uta & Film Live). The two parts of the compilation film opened in Japanese theaters on September 27 and November 8, respectively. Crunchyroll reported that both parts of the compilation film aired in over 70 Japanese theaters.

=== Manga ===
A manga adaptation written and illustrated by Yuama with story by Yotsuji Haibuchi that retells the story from Soyo Nagasaki's perspective, titled BanG Dream! It's MyGO!!!!! Swaying in the Rain, Looking for the Sunshine (Japanese: BanG Dream! It's MyGO!!!!! 雨にそよいで晴れを請う, Hepburn: Bandori! Itsu Maigō!!!!! Ame ni Soyoide Hare o Kou), was announced on October 21, 2024. It began serialization in Comic Growl on December 27, 2024, in both Japanese and English, with its chapters collected in three tankōbon volumes as of June 2026.

==== Volumes ====
No.	Japanese release date	Japanese ISBN
1	May 8, 2025	978-4-04-899682-2; 978-4-04-899683-9 (SE)
2	November 8, 2025	978-4-04-899785-0
3	June 8, 2026	978-4-04-921130-6; 978-4-04-921129-0 (SE)
4	December 8, 2026	978-4-04-921195-5

=== Other media ===
A series of shorts focusing on the daily lives of the members of MyGO!!!!!, titled "MyGO!!!!! Members' Daily Life" (MyGO!!!!!メンバーの日常, MyGO!!!!! Menbā no Nichijō), started releasing on the band's YouTube channel in August 2022.

== Reception ==
In the Anime Preview Guide on Anime News Network, responses to the series premiere were mixed. Some reviewers found its pace engaging for its differences from previous similar anime such as Love Live! or previous BanG Dream! installments, with Christopher Farris describing it as "impressively melancholic", while James Beckett disliked the narrative's tone and found it dull in comparison, and Richard Eisenbeis felt that the plot was difficult to follow. The characters, particularly Tomori, were generally praised. Despite his dislike of the episode's pacing, Beckett found the show's 3D animation and visual style to be strong, while Nicholas Dupree and Rebecca Silverman had mixed feelings about the look of the series. The series would win an award at the 2023 Reddit Anime Awards on the r/anime subreddit for the "Anime of the Year" prize, from the award jury. It was voted as the Best Anime of 2023 on 5channel. Taki Shiina's line "This person doesn't know anything! I'm blocking them!" (「こいつ何も分かってない！ブロックしてやる！」) was nominated for the Grand Prize at the 2023 Anime Buzzword Award.

Farris expressed eagerness to see how It's MyGO!!!!! would fit into the larger franchise prior to the show's premiere, and later reviewed the entire series for the publication. He praised Yuniko Ayana's writing, the characters, the animation and visual direction, and the show's emotional weight and dramatic tonal and narrative differences from past BanG Dream! installments, calling the series "the most wildly ambitious" entry of the franchise, and credited it with reinvigorating his enthusiasm as a BanG Dream! fan. He would later select it as his favorite of the summer 2023 season, and ultimately of 2023 overall, and said that he was eagerly anticipating the sequel. He also named the song Hekitenbansou (碧天伴走) as one of the best anime songs of 2023, citing its use in episode 7 to show Tomori's character development. Despite his praise, Farris felt that the final episode was an "awkwardly abrupt conclusion" and noted that some scenes can "look too washed-out or too dark."

Steve Jones, who also selected it as his favorite of the year, had similar praises. Jones particularly emphasized the perceived yuri subtext of the series, attributing its presence to Yuniko Ayana's history with the genre in works such as Flip Flappers. In particular, Jones highlighted the "bold and almost experimental swerve" of the first-person perspective in which the third episode is told, and the scene in the eighth episode where Soyo and Sakiko argue as his favorite anime scene of the year, calling it "indistinguishable from a fight between two exes." He additionally named Anon his favorite character of the year, praising the character for her emotional depth, uniqueness, and interesting development throughout the show.

Nick Creamer wrote on the Crunchyroll blog that while it may be hard for some fans to find the series, it differs from the dramedy of Love Live!, rising to become one of the "most beloved productions" of 2023, and predicted it would become beloved in 2025, noting the series' mix of "tortured personal drama, rich character arcs, and ... heart-on-sleeve musical performances." He also argued that the series writer Yuniko Ayana provides the backbone and personality of the series, constructing a "rich web of emotional hangups and personal connections" while paying attention to character acting and visual framing, engaging in melodramatic psychological drama which makes it a standout series within "the music drama ecosystem."

Yota Tokuda of Real Sound stressed that the storyline of It's MyGO!!!!! was against the tide from previous idol anime. He pointed out the portrayal of failure and split of the band members happened after a successful live performance in episode 7, embodying the "rock ethos" that overturning the established norms of music anime. He also praised the performance in episode 10, suggesting "they seem to be attempting resistance by creating a new kind of circularity, breaking free from the tragic cycle. Anime Feminist reviewer Brock K also pointed out that the anime's handling of frictions is different from the common practice of other works in this genre, and praised the more dramatic tone and style for the writing allowed all of the characters to move beyond their archetypes and be fully-fleshed out real people with flaws and all.

Chinese digital newspaper The Paper praised the use of 3DCG animation in It's MyGO!!!!! and believed the modeling, character actions and behaviors, and lighting and shadows in the anime surpass the pursuit of realism in traditional hand-drawn animation, presenting unique emotional expression and visual appeal. The Paper particularly praised the uses of the first-person narrative of the 3rd episode and the fixed camera angle switching in the 7th episode, citing that "at its core, it is a subjectivity born of creative intent, artfully concealed within an ethical framework defined by two distinct forms of exclusion and limitation ... there are both precise calculations and the revelation of the traces of the scriptwriter's self-observation." Despite this, The Paper also criticizes the overreliance on this technique for damaging the sensibility of the scenes and the authenticity of their characters.

In December 2024, a newborn king penguin from Xpark, an aquarium in Taiwan, was officially named "Tomorin", a nickname of Tomori Takamatsu, after an online name voting event. Xpark contacted the Japanese producers of the anime and their Japanese management team to ensure the event met expectations and could proceed smoothly.

== Sequels ==
A direct sequel, BanG Dream! Ave Mujica, was announced after the final episode's release. It was broadcast in 2025, with a sequel to both It's MyGO!!!!! and Ave Mujica being later announced following its airing. The anime, titled BanG Dream! MyGO!!!!! // Ave Mujica, is set to premiere on January 8, 2027, on the Friday Anime Night programming block on Nippon Television and its affiliates.
