= Selection Project =

Japanese anime television series

- Poster of Selection Project
- Genre: Slice of life
- Manga
- Illustrated by: Kōji Azuma
- Published by: Square Enix
- Magazine: Manga Up!
- Original run: July 11, 2021 – March 27, 2022
- Volumes: 2
- Anime television series
- Directed by: Daisuke Hiramaki
- Written by: Yūya Takahashi
- Music by: Takurō Iga
- Studio: Doga Kobo
- Licensed by: Crunchyroll: SA/SEA: Muse Communication
- Original network: AT-X, Tokyo MX, KBS Kyoto, SUN, TVA, BS11
- Original run: October 1, 2021 – December 24, 2021
- Episodes: 13
- icon

Selection Project (stylized as SELECTION PROJECT) is a Japanese anime television series produced by Doga Kobo. It is based on Kadokawa's Idol x Audition x Reality Show multimedia project, which began in December 2019. It aired from October to December 2021.

== Plot ==
Selection Project is an idol show in which aspiring idols from all across Japan compete to win a debut contract. In its seventh season, nine girls manage to win their regional auditions to compete on the main show. Among them are Suzune Miyama, a girl from north Kanto who had recently recovered from being hospitalized, and Rena Hananoi, the younger sister of the first season's winner, Akari Amasawa, who died three years prior in a truck accident.

== Characters ==
Suzune Miyama (美山 鈴音, Miyama Suzune)
Voiced by: Hinaki Yano
Suzune is the 14-year-old representative candidate from Saitama Prefecture for the northern Kanto block. She is a bright and positive girl who grew up with a weak heart and spent most of her childhood in the hospital. However, she begins to idolize Akari Amasawa and strive to become a singer herself one day. She enters the Selection Project audition and originally lost due to her collapsing on stage, but later represents her block due to the withdrawal of her friend Seira.
Rena Hananoi (花野井 玲那, Hananoi Rena)
Voiced by: Saku Mizuno
Rena is the 14-year-old representative candidate from Tokyo for the southern Kanto block. She strived to become an idol like her older sister, Akari Amasawa. However, her death caused Rena to develop a serious personality as she wants to be recognized not as Akari's sister but in her own right, going as far as adopting her maternal surname to distinguish from her late sister, as her real name is Rena Amasawa (天沢 玲那, Amasawa Rena).
Hiromi Hamaguri (濱栗 広海, Hamaguri Hiromi)
Voiced by: Nozomi Nagumo
16 years old. Originated from Osaka Prefecture. The representative candidate for the Kinki block. Influenced by her two older brothers, Hiromi acts like a tomboy and hates to lose. She is especially popular with junior high girls in her hometown.
Nagisa Imau (今鵜 凪咲, Imau Nagisa)
Voiced by: Ruri Arai
15 years old. Originated from Kōchi Prefecture. The representative candidate for the Shikoku block.
Nodoka Yagi (八木野 土香, Yagi Nodoka)
Voiced by: Hina Yōmiya
14 years old. Originated from Hokkaido. The representative candidate for the Hokkaido block.
Ao Yodogawa (淀川 逢生, Yodogawa Ao)
Voiced by: Yuka Iwahashi
13 years old. Originated from Hiroshima Prefecture. The representative candidate for the Chugoku block.
Uta Koizumi (小泉 詩, Koizumi Uta)
Voiced by: Mizuna Shirakawa
11 years old. Originated from Miyagi Prefecture. The representative candidate for the Tohoku block. Even though she has been an actress since kindergarten, she also wanted to be an idol.
Shiori Yamaga (山鹿 栞, Yamaga Shiori)
Voiced by: Miharu Hanai
14 years old. Originated from Aichi Prefecture. The representative candidate for the Chubu block. She comes from a rich family.
Mako Toma (当麻 まこ, Tōma Mako)
Voiced by: Shino Shimoji
17 years old. Originated from Fukuoka Prefecture. The representative candidate for the Kyushu-Okinawa block.
Seira Kurusu (来栖 セイラ, Kurusu Seira)
Voiced by: Saori Ōnishi
15 years old. Originated from Gunma Prefecture. The representative candidate for the northern Kanto block. She is half American from her mother side. She is the original winner of the Northern Kanto representative, but later withdraws so that Suzune can compete.
Sumipanda (スミパンダ)
Voiced by: Daisuke Ono
The MC for Selection Project. He was previously a solo idol who became discouraged after his career stalled.
Akari Amasawa (天沢 灯, Amasawa Akari)
Voiced by: Saori Hayami
The legendary idol who won the first Selection Project. She lost her life in a truck accident three years prior to start of the story.
Sunny (サニー, Sanī)
Voiced by: Mabuki Andou^{Ep. 3 credits}
The dorm mother of the lodge the girls stay at for the duration of the contest.

== Production ==
The project was named "Project Nyanco", which was a reference of Onyanko Club, when it was launched in 2018.

== Media ==
=== Manga ===
A manga adaptation by Kōji Azuma began serialization in Square Enix's online manga magazine Manga Up! on July 11, 2021.

No.	Japanese release date	Japanese ISBN
1	September 22, 2021	978-4-75-757485-4
2	April 7, 2022	978-4-75-757796-1

=== Anime ===
The series was announced by Kadokawa on December 4, 2020. The series was directed by Daisuke Hiramaki and written by Yūya Takahashi, with character designs by Kanna Hirayama, and music composed by Takurō Iga. It aired from October 1 to December 24, 2021, on AT-X, Tokyo MX, KBS Kyoto, SUN, TVA, and BS11. 9-tie (pronounced as "cutie"), a group composed of the series' nine main cast members, performed the opening theme song "Glorious Days," as well as the ending theme song "Only one yell." Funimation licensed the series outside of Asia. Muse Communication licensed the series in South and Southeast Asia.

==== Episodes ====
No.	Title (Note: All translated English titles are taken from Funimation.)	Directed by	Written by	Storyboarded by	Original release date
1	"Only one yell"	Daisuke Hiramaki	Yūya Takahashi	Daisuke Hiramaki	October 1, 2021
Across Japan, regional finals are being held for the seventh season of the idol audition show, Selection Project. Among the contestants in the northern Kanto block is Suzune Miyama, a girl who had been recovering from hospitalization until recently. For their audition, all the contestants are asked to perform the song "Only one yell" by the first season's winner, Akari Amasawa, who died in a car accident three years ago. In the other regions, Rena Hananoi, Hiromi Hamaguri, Nagisa Imau, Nodoka Yagi, Ao Yodogawa, Uta Koizumi, Shiori Yamaga, and Mako Toma are all chosen by the public as winners. Suzune, on the other hand, briefly collapses during her performance, resulting in her narrowly losing to her fellow competitor Seira Kurusu.
2	"The Girls on a Journey to Tomorrow"; Transliteration: "Ashita e Tabidatsu Shōjo-tachi" (Japanese: 明日へ旅立つ少女たち)	Hiroshi Haraguchi	Yūya Takahashi	Hiroshi Haraguchi	October 8, 2021
As the other competitors make their way to Tokyo where Selection Project will be held, Seira asks Suzune to spend the day with her. Affirming that Suzune still wants to sing, Seira makes the decision to drop out of Selection Project in order to study abroad, leading Suzune to take her place on the show. And so, Suzune arrives at the studio's lodge where the contestants will be living for the duration of the competition.
3	"If Singing Vanished From the World"; Transliteration: "Moshi Kono Sekai kara Uta ga Kietara" (Japanese: もしこの世界から歌が消えたら)	Natsumi Uchinuma	Yūya Takahashi	Natsumi Uchinuma	October 15, 2021
The first round of the competition sees the contestants formed into three different groups, who each need to gain 100,000 yells in order to proceed to the next round. Suzune and Rena's group suddenly gets half the required yells when word spreads that Rena is Akari's younger sister. As Rena states that she wants to win with her own strength, Suzune tells her how much Akari inspired her when she was hospitalized. Coming to an agreement as both teammates and rivals, the two give a successful performance that pushes them into the next round. Meanwhile, the show's host Sumipanda warns the other contestants that it is very likely one team might lose in the first round.
4	"Rush, Crash, Splash"; Transliteration: "Rasshu! Kurasshu! Supurasshu!" (Japanese: ラッシュ！クラッシュ！スプラッシュ！)	Tatsuya Nokimori	Yūya Takahashi	Kiyoko Sayama	October 22, 2021
With Suzune and Rena already through, Hiromi, Nagisa, Nodoka and Ao's group are under pressure to get the yells they need before the deadline. While Hiromi wants the group to perfectly replicate an existing choreography, Nagisa clashes with her, saying they need to express their individuality more. After Suzune helps them to listen to each other, Hiromi realizes her way was wrong and the group, Splash Soda, giving a successful performance that gets them close to the final amount they need.
5	"Ecstatic Troublemakers"; Transliteration: "Uchōten Toraburumēkā" (Japanese: 有頂天トラブルメーカー)	Sung Min Kim	Yūya Takahashi	Kiyoko Sayama	October 29, 2021
The remaining group GapsCaps, formed of Uta, Mako, and Shiori, struggles with the impending deadline as Shiori wants to make sure they can perform perfectly. After Splash Soda passes the yell requirement, Mako becomes frustrated by the other's bickering, wondering if they should all just drop out. After speaking with her mother, with her family's encouragement, Mako goes to visit a shrine, allowing her to reaffirm her dream and encourage the others. As a result, everyone manages to pass the first round with 100,000 cheers.
6	"Her Heart, Her Hidden Secret"; Transliteration: "Dare mo Shiranai Mune no Uchi" (Japanese: 誰も知らない胸の内)	Masanori Takahashi	Yūya Takahashi	Masanori Takahashi	November 5, 2021
The second round tasks the girls with performing together in swimsuits, but Suzune is reluctant to wear anything revealing. Upon going to confront her, Rena discovers that Suzune has a scar on her chest left over from heart surgery that saved her life. Although Rena agrees to keep it a secret, the others' suspicions over Suzune keeping something from them forces her to reveal it herself, after which she becomes ashamed and runs away.
7	"Feelings in Naked Blue"; Transliteration: "Mukidashi no Omoi wa Burū" (Japanese: むき出しの想いはブルー)	Hiroshi Haraguchi	Yūya Takahashi	Hiroshi Haraguchi	November 12, 2021
As Suzune feels guilt over the donor who gave her their heart, she starts to avoid practice. Meanwhile, the others discover that Sumipanda's real identity is a former idol named Red-bean Jun. Speaking with Suzune, Rena shows her an organ donor card she has, suggesting to Suzune that she write a letter to her donor's family to help her come to terms with her feelings. Later, Suzune receives a fan letter from a young girl in a hospital which, along with Rena's advice, encourages her to rejoin practice with everyone, with their subsequent performance leading everyone to pass round 2. However, Sumipanda then reveals only seven contestants can participate in the final round, and they themselves must vote on which two should drop out.
8	"The True Tone of Her Heart"; Transliteration: "Kokoro no Hontō no Neiro" (Japanese: 心の本当の音色)	Tatsuya Nokimori	Yūya Takahashi	Kiyoko Sayama	November 19, 2021
As the impending vote leaves everyone conflicted, Rena receives a package from her mother containing a bunch of letters sent to their family, including the one that Suzune wrote. Upon chasing after Rena as she refuses to take part in an interview about the vote, Suzune learns what Rena had discovered; that the heart she received was given to her by Akari following her death. This leads Rena to lash out at Suzune, believing that her success was thanks to Akari's heart.
9	"My Self in the Seashell"; Transliteration: "Kaigara no Naka no Watashi" (Japanese: 貝殻の中の私)	Kōki Uchinomiya	Yūya Takahashi	Kiyoko Sayama	November 26, 2021
Feeling guilty over what she said to Suzune, Rena apologizes to her, saying that she got her with her own talent and always wanted to meet the one whose life Akari had saved. In her subsequent interview, Rena states that she does not deserve to stand up on stage, effectively declaring her intention to drop out. After the others give this matter considerate thought, the day of the vote arrives.
10	"I Just Want to Sing"; Transliteration: "Tada Utaitakute" (Japanese: ただ 歌いたくて)	Sung Min Kim	Yūya Takahashi	Sung Min Kim, Yūna Suginogaki	December 3, 2021
To the shock of Sumipanda and the viewing public, the vote ends up a tie as everyone chooses to vote for themselves, stating that they want to perform as a group of nine. The girls' refusal to vote again results in everyone getting disqualified and the seventh season of Selection Project ending with no winner. In the weeks that follows, the girls meet up during weekends to discuss plans of forming their own group, but Rena takes a backseat role, feeling she does not have a reason to sing. After looking over the things Akari had said during her life, however, Rena realizes that she really does want to sing with everyone as the idol group 9-tie.
11	"One Little Step at a Time"; Transliteration: "Sukoshi da kedo Sukoshizutsu" (Japanese: 少しだけど 少しずつ)	Natsumi Uchinuma	Yūya Takahashi	Natsumi Uchinuma	December 10, 2021
9-tie begins performing weekly but struggles to get much in the way of an audience. Their mood further dampens when Karin and Ayano, who were in the north Kanto qualifiers alongside Suzune, vent their frustration at them dropping out of the show. Despite these struggles, the girls manage to spread word of their mini-concerts to gain a decent audience, even winning over Karin and Ayano with their performance. Noticing 9-tie's success, Jun invites them to return to Selection Project for a special final round, offering them a professional debut if they can earn 2,000,000 yells. As the girls return to the lodge to prepare, Suzune begins to act strangely.
12	"The Feelings We Want You To Know"; Transliteration: "Anata ni Todoketai Omoi" (Japanese: あなたに届けたい想い)	Hiroshi Haraguchi, Sung Min Kim, Daisuke Hiramaki	Yūya Takahashi	Yūna Suginogaki	December 17, 2021
Just as the girls prepare for the final round, Suzune falls unconscious after she collapses from overexhaustion. As Rena and dorm mother Sunny accompany Suzune to the hospital, Sunny reveals that she is the CEO in charge of Selection Project, who took on the role of dorm mother to ensure what happened to Akari would not happen again. Meanwhile, the program begins with the other contestants, who try to buy time until Suzune and Rena return, with Jun buying some extra time by showing some behind-the-scenes footage. As the girls send out their wishes to wake Suzune up, Akari appears before Suzune in her dream.
13	"Our Glorious Days"	Daisuke Hiramaki, Sung Min Kim	Yūya Takahashi	Daisuke Hiramaki	December 24, 2021
Cheered on by Akari and their mutual love for cheering on others, Suzune awakens from her slumber, allowing her and Rena to make it to the show in time. As a result of their efforts, 9-tie successfully reach their target and are officially signed on by Project Select.

=== Live concert ===
- SELECTION PROJECT 1st LIVE 〜Cheer for you!〜 (January 30, 2022)

== Similarities ==
Selection Project is an example of the twin films phenomena alongside Idoly Pride. Reviewers have compared both anime to each other and have described the two as sharing certain storylines and similar characters. Both franchises were greenlit days apart in December 2019, and aired within months of each other.
