= Hina Yōmiya =

Japanese voice actress

- 羊宮 妃那
- Born: March 26, 2000 (age 26); Nara Prefecture, Japan
- Occupation: Voice actress
- Years active: 2020–present
- Agent: Aoni Production
- Notable work: The Dangers in My Heart as Anna Yamada; Selection Project as Nodoka Yagi; My Dress-Up Darling as Shinju Inui; The Greatest Demon Lord Is Reborn as a Typical Nobody as Ginny Fin de Salvan; BanG Dream! as Tomori Takamatsu; Star Detective Precure! as Mashutan

Hina Yōmiya (羊宮 妃那, Yōmiya Hina; born March 26, 2000) is a Japanese voice actress who is affiliated with Aoni Production. She began her career in 2020, and has played roles such as Nodoka Yagi in Selection Project, Shinju Inui in My Dress-Up Darling, Anna Yamada in The Dangers In My Heart, Tomori Takamatsu in BanG Dream! It's MyGO!!!!!, Hyacine in Honkai: Star Rail and Mashutan in Star Detective Precure!

== Career ==
Yōmiya was born in Nara Prefecture on March 26, 2000. In 2019, she participated in audition to play the lead role in the anime series Sakugan, where she became one of the seven finalists. Although she ultimately did not win the role, she became affiliated with talent agency Aoni Production the following year.

Yōmiya played her first main role in an anime series in 2021, voicing Nodoka Yagi in Selection Project. The following year, she played the roles of Shinju Inui in My Dress-Up Darling, Ginny Fin de Salvan in The Greatest Demon Lord Is Reborn as a Typical Nobody, and Sakurako Mikage in When Will Ayumu Make His Move?. In 2023, she played the roles of Lainie Cyan in The Magical Revolution of the Reincarnated Princess and the Genius Young Lady and Anna Yamada in The Dangers in My Heart. In March 2024, she was one of the recipients of the Best New Actor Award at the 18th Seiyu Awards.

In January 2024, it was reported that Yōmiya, who voiced Tomori Takamatsu in BanG Dream! It's MyGO!!!!!, and Anna Yamada in The Dangers in My Heart, participated in a musical collaboration between the two anime series. She covered Kohana Lam's song, "Koishiteru Jubun sura Aiserunda", the ending song for The Dangers in My Heart season 2.

== Filmography ==
=== Anime ===
2021

- Selection Project, Nodoka Yagi

2022

- My Dress-Up Darling, Shinju Inui
- The Greatest Demon Lord Is Reborn as a Typical Nobody, Ginny Fin de Salvan
- In the Heart of Kunoichi Tsubaki, Mokuren
- When Will Ayumu Make His Move?, Sakurako Mikage

2023

- The Magical Revolution of the Reincarnated Princess and the Genius Young Lady, Lainie Cyan
- Giant Beasts of Ars, Kuumi
- The Eminence in Shadow, #665
- The Dangers in My Heart, Anna Yamada
- Oshi no Ko, Minami Kotobuki
- BanG Dream! It's MyGO!!!!!, Tomori Takamatsu
- Sylvanian Families Freya no Go for Dream!, Sally Manely
- Tonikawa: Over the Moon for You – High School Days, Mishio Usa
- Tearmoon Empire, Eris Littstein
- Stardust Telepath, Honami Konohoshi

2024

- Go! Go! Loser Ranger!, Fighter XX
- How to Become Ordinary, Yuki Osanai
- Mayonaka Punch, Fū

2025

- BanG Dream! Ave Mujica, Tomori Takamatsu
- The Daily Life of a Middle-Aged Online Shopper in Another World, Lilith
- Once Upon a Witch's Death, Sophie Hayter
- Mono, Torayo Kurokuma
- Mobile Suit Gundam GQuuuuuuX, Lalah Sune
- A Couple of Cuckoos Season 2, Ai Mochizuki
- A Star Brighter Than the Sun, Hisui Onodera
- Wandance, Hikari Wanda
- Chitose Is in the Ramune Bottle, Yua Uchida

2026

- Star Detective Precure!, Mashutan
- Yu-Gi-Oh! Card Game The Chronicles, Lil-la

=== Films ===
2024

- Trapezium, Kurumi Taiga

2027

- Ghost, Mike

=== Video games ===
2022

- Magia Record, Tsuyu Mizuna
- Goddess of Victory: Nikke, Alice
- Azur Lane, Kala Ideas, Argus

2023

- Atelier Ryza 3: Alchemist of the End & the Secret Key, Kala Ideas
- Hyperdimension Neptunia GameMaker R:Evolution, Lideo
- Takt Op. Symphony, Opera [The Freeshooter]
- Granblue Fantasy, Thalassa
- White Cat Project, Harujion
- BanG Dream! Girls Band Party!, Tomori Takamatsu
- Umamusume: Pretty Derby, Daring Tact
- Dead or Alive Xtreme Venus Vacation, Shizuku

2024

- Assault Lily: Last Bullet, Wakana Maki
- Wuthering Waves, Taoqi

2025

- ToHeart, Multi
- Trails in the Sky 1st Chapter, Kloe Rinz
- Honkai: Star Rail, Hyacine

2026

- Azur Lane, Shizuku
- BanG Dream! Our Notes, Tomori Takamatsu
