= BanG Dream! =

Japanese music media franchise

- Logo

BanG Dream! バンドリ！ (Bandori!)
- Genre: Musical fiction
- Created by: Takaaki Kidani (Bushiroad)
- Manga

BanG_Dream! Star Beat
- Written by: Kō Nakamura
- Illustrated by: Aya Ishida
- Published by: Bushiroad
- Magazine: Monthly Bushiroad
- Original run: January 2015 – December 2015
Further information
Manga
Written by	Kō Nakamura
Illustrated by	Mami Kashiwabara
Published by	Bushiroad
English publisher	SG: Shogakukan Asia
Magazine	Monthly Bushiroad
Original run	April 2016 – February 2019
Manga
Yonkoma: Bandori!
Written by	Hakuto Shiroi
Published by	ASCII Media Works
Magazine	Dengeki G's Comic
Original run	2016 – 2017
Volumes	2
Light novel
Written by	Kō Nakamura
Illustrated by	Hitowa
Published by	ASCII Media Works
Imprint	Dengeki Bunko
Published	April 25, 2016
Manga
BanG Dream! Girls Band Party! Roselia Stage
Written by	Pepako Dokuta
Published by	Overlap
English publisher	Tokyopop
Magazine	Gardo Comics
Original run	February 10, 2017 – September 25, 2017
Volumes	2
Manga
RAiSe! The story of my music
Written by	Kō Nakamura
Illustrated by	Ryū Shihara
Published by	Bushiroad
Magazine	Monthly Bushiroad
Original run	February 2019 – present
Anime television series
Directed by	Atsushi Ōtsuki (season 1); Kōdai Kakimoto (seasons 2–3)
Produced by	Akane Taketsugu (season 1); Atsushi Iwasaki (season 1); Atsushi Ōta (season 1); Naohiko Furuchi (season 1); Yasuhiro Nakajima (season 1); Yūichi Kawakami (season 1); Yoshiyuki Shioya (seasons 1–2); Yūki Nemoto (season 2); Satoshi Tanaka (seasons 2–3); Takefumi Kanari (seasons 2–3); Shūichi Heishi (seasons 2–3); Shiryū Kitazawa (season 3)
Written by	Yuniko Ayana
Music by	Elements Garden
Studio	Issen (season 1); Xebec (season 1); Sanzigen (seasons 2–3)
Licensed by	NA: Sentai Filmworks; SA/SEA: Muse Communication
Original network	Tokyo MX, KBS, SUN, AT-X
English network	SEA: Animax Asia
Original run	January 21, 2017 – April 23, 2020
Episodes	39 + OVA
Anime television series
Pastel Life
Directed by	Tommy Hino
Studio	Studio A-Cat
Original network	Tokyo MX
Original run	May 16, 2018 – June 21, 2018
Episodes	6
Anime film
BanG Dream! Film Live
Directed by	Tomomi Umetsu
Written by	Kō Nakamura
Music by	Elements Garden
Studio	Sanzigen
Licensed by	NA: Sentai Filmworks; SEA: Muse Communication
Released	September 13, 2019
Runtime	72 minutes
Anime film
BanG Dream! Episode of Roselia
Directed by	Kōdai Kakimoto (Chief); Atsushi Mimura
Written by	Kōdai Kakimoto; Midori Gotou
Music by	Elements Garden
Studio	Sanzigen
Licensed by	Crunchyroll (Note: In North America through Crunchyroll, LLC (formerly known as Funimation).)
Released	April 23, 2021 – June 25, 2021
Anime film
BanG Dream! Film Live 2nd Stage
Directed by	Tomomi Umetsu
Written by	Kō Nakamura
Music by	Elements Garden
Studio	Sanzigen
Licensed by	Crunchyroll
Released	August 20, 2021
Runtime	84 minutes
Anime film
BanG Dream! Poppin'Dream!
Directed by	Kōdai Kakimoto (Chief); Masanori Uetaka
Written by	Yuniko Ayana
Music by	Elements Garden
Studio	Sanzigen
Licensed by	Crunchyroll
Released	January 1, 2022
Runtime	71 minutes
Anime television series
BanG Dream! Morfonication
Directed by	Kōdai Kakimoto (Chief); Tomomi Umetsu
Written by	Hitomi Ogawa
Music by	Elements Garden
Studio	Sanzigen
Original network	Tokyo MX
Original run	July 28, 2022 – July 29, 2022
Episodes	2
Anime television series
Ganso! BanG Dream! Chan
Original network	YouTube
Original run	October 2, 2025 – October 1, 2026
Episodes	52
Anime television series
BanG Dream! Yume∞Mita
Directed by	Tomomi Umetsu
Written by	Midori Gotō
Music by	Bushiroad Music
Studio	Nichicaline
Licensed by	Crunchyroll: SEA: Muse Communication
Original network	Tokyo MX
Original run	July 2, 2026 – September 10, 2026
Episodes	13
Manga
BanG Dream! Yume∞Mita Arale∞Arabu-ration
Written by	Kō Nakamura
Illustrated by	Kuunerin
Published by	Bushiroad
Magazine	Comic Growl
Original run	July 24, 2026 – present
Video game
BanG Dream! Our Notes
Developer	FROMTOKYO
Publisher	JP: Bushiroad; WW: Bilibili
Genre	Rhythm game, visual novel
Platform	iOS, Android
Released	September 24, 2026
Related
BanG Dream! Girls Band Party!; BanG Dream! Girls Band Party! Pico; BanG Dream! It's MyGO!!!!!; BanG Dream! Ave Mujica
- icon

BanG Dream!, (Note: "BanG Dream!" is a stylized form of "Girl Band Dream", the uppercase "G" of "Girl" replacing the lowercase "d" of "Band" to form "BanG".) also known as Bandori! (バンドリ！), is a Japanese music media franchise owned by Bushiroad. Created by Bushiroad president Takaaki Kidani in January 2015 with original story by Kō Nakamura, the project began as a manga before expanding to other media. In addition to other manga, BanG Dream! includes several anime television series, live concerts, singles and albums, VTubers, and the mobile rhythm games Girls Band Party! and Our Notes.

The franchise's premise is based around all-female bands whose members are also voice actresses in the anime and mobile game; as of 2026, the project has twelve groups, nine of which are capable of playing their respective characters' instruments. mikhail andropopov The first band, Poppin'Party, was formed in February 2015, and further groups were introduced in 2016 with the launch of the mobile game: Roselia, Afterglow, Hello, Happy World!, and Pastel Palettes. In 2018, a backup band called The Third was renamed Raise A Suilen and joined the series, followed by a seventh unit named Morfonica in 2020. Further expansion since 2022 introduced MyGO!!!!!, Ave Mujica, Mugendai MewType, Millsage, and Ikka Dumb Rock!.

For live performances, the voice actresses for Poppin'Party, Roselia, Raise A Suilen, Morfonica, MyGO!!!!!, Ave Mujica, and Mugendai MewType play their own music, while the others are limited to vocals. The original seven bands are grouped in the Girls Band Party! set of media whereas the other five are part of Our Notes. While they are separate games, the bands exist in the same canon.

The anime, which follows fictional representations of the bands, has three seasons of 13 episodes each. The first season, produced by Issen (OLM with Bushiroad) and Xebec, aired from January to April 2017. Sanzigen took over production duties for the second and third seasons, which were respectively broadcast in winter 2019 and 2020. A concert-centric movie BanG Dream! Film Live was released in 2019, followed by a sequel Film Live 2nd Stage in 2021. Three band-focused films have also been produced: the two-part Episode of Roselia series premiered in 2021, followed by BanG Dream! Poppin'Dream! premiered in 2022.

Spin-off anime series include BanG Dream! Girls Band Party! Pico and its sequels Pico: Ohmori and Pico Fever! by Sanzigen with DMM.futureworks and Pastel Life by Studio A-Cat, as well as Ganso! BanG Dream! Chan. An anime following MyGO!!!!! titled BanG Dream! It's MyGO!!!!! aired from June to September 2023. The sequel to It's MyGO!!!!! following Ave Mujica titled BanG Dream! Ave Mujica aired from January to March 2025. A sequel to both preceding anime titled BanG Dream! MyGO!!!!! // Ave Mujica is set to premiere in January 2027. An anime following Mugendai MewType produced by Nichicaline titled BanG Dream! Yume∞Mita aired from July to September 2026.

The series has enjoyed international popularity for its live performances and mobile games, while the main anime series has seen mixed but improving reviews with later seasons. In 2018, the franchise expanded to include a male-based counterpart Argonavis from BanG Dream!, which was spun off into an independent brand From Argonavis in 2021.

== Plot ==
BanG Dream! follows Kasumi Toyama, a happy-go-lucky girl and a new student at Hanasakigawa Girls' High School. During her first weeks at the school, she tries out for numerous clubs in an effort to rediscover the "Star Beat", a "sparkling, heart-pounding" feeling she experienced while looking up at the stars in the night sky as a child.

One day, while returning from school, she spots a trail of star stickers that lead her to a pawnshop owned by her classmate Arisa Ichigaya. In the storage area, she finds a star-shaped guitar with glittery stickers on it and quickly becomes attached to it. The two later visit a local live house, Space, where Kasumi decides to create a band upon watching a performance by a group named Glitter Green. She then recruits Arisa and three of their classmates – Sāya Yamabuki, Tae Hanazono, and Rimi Ushigome – to join her, though they are reluctant for personal reasons. Despite their initial misgivings, the five overcome many hurdles and ultimately agree to form the band "Poppin'Party". With her bandmates, Kasumi finds the excitement that she had been looking for.

During their first year of high school, Poppin'Party meets and befriends four all-girl bands at Hanasakigawa and nearby Haneoka Girls' High School, each of whom has their own stories: Afterglow consists of five childhood friends who maintain their friendship through music; Pastel Palettes is an idol group who are capable of playing their own instruments; Roselia is a gothic rock band who strives to become the perfect band; and Hello, Happy World! is an eccentric band that seeks to spread happiness. As second-year students, they encounter Raise A Suilen, an electronic music group aiming to revolutionize the girl's band genre, and Morfonica, a newly formed classical band of first-years at Tsukinomori Girls' Academy with dreams of changing themselves for the better.

A year later, a band called Crychic disbands on acrimonious terms. Some of their members form a new group called MyGO!!!!! while others create Ave Mujica. The two bands maintain a relationship with each other while often interacting with the other seven.

== History ==
=== Early history (2015–2016) ===
Original logo, as used in BanG_Dream! Star Beat

The premise for BanG Dream! was conceptualized in March 2014 by Bushiroad president Takaaki Kidani, who wanted to lead a music project after seeing the success of Love Live! School Idol Festival, a mobile game published by his company. When a staff member attended The Idolmaster Masters of Idol World!! 2014 concert at Saitama Super Arena, they took interest in guitarist Aimi and proposed having her in an all-female band. Figuring that such a concept would best be viable as a media franchise, Kidani concluded his new project's best method to gain success would be to have voice actresses who could play their own instruments in live shows. To differentiate it from similar music works, Kidani has stressed that BanG Dream! is not an idol franchise but a "girl band" series.

Novelist Kō Nakamura was approached by a Bushiroad editor who had read his music book Round and Round Slide to write the story, and he partnered with Aya Ishida for the franchise's first work BanG_Dream! Star Beat; the manga started serialization in the Monthly Bushiroad magazine in January 2015. Star Beat's universe was retconned following the franchise's reboot in 2016 as BanG Dream! without the underscore. According to an August 24, 2016, post on Nakamura's Livedoor blog, the name BanG Dream! stemmed from the idea of "shooting" toward one's dreams. Nakamura, who is formally credited as the franchise's original story creator, based certain aspects of the plot on his high school life such as the desire and efforts to form a band, the guitarist finding the instrument in a pawnshop, and band meetings being held in a warehouse. To produce music, Kidani enlisted Noriyasu Agematsu of Elements Garden, who was skeptical of the franchise's concept due to the difficulties in balancing voice acting with practicing musical instruments but subsequently signed on to the project. Prior musical experience was not a prerequisite for voice actresses as their primary responsibility was to portray characters for in-universe media, though they remained committed to playing their instruments, a mindset that Kidani felt grew the series' charm with fans; in 2019, he noted that some cast members practiced for ten hours daily.

At her Love Generation concert on February 28, 2015, Aimi announced she had aligned with the franchise, which included creating a band and serving as its guitarist and vocalist. Rimi Nishimoto and Ayasa Itō joined the band in April, and the three hosted the project's first concert on April 18. In June, Aimi performed a solo concert at CharaExpo 2015 in Singapore, the franchise's first performance outside of Japan. The group was officially named Poppin'Party during the month, and Sae Ōtsuka and Ayaka Ōhashi completed the band lineup later in the year. In addition to live performances, the five would voice their own characters in other media such as an anime series and animated music videos; the character designs were also loosely modeled after their voice actresses to better reflect their ability to sing and perform.

Poppin'Party's debut single "Yes! BanG_Dream!" was released on February 24, 2016. A music video for the song was produced by Issen, a joint venture formed between Bushiroad and OLM, Inc. in 2015 that was also tasked with developing the anime. To lead the animation, Nakamura served as writer while Agematsu and Pixiv artist Hitowa managed music production and character design, respectively. Poppin'Party conducted the franchise's first in-character live on April 24; the group's early performances were inspired by fellow all-female group Silent Siren, and the two bands collaborated in May 2019 for the Battle of the Bands-style No Girl No Cry concert at MetLife Dome. Poppin'Party's third single "On Your New Journey / Tear Drops" (Note: Japanese title: "Hashiri Hajimeta Bakari no Kimi ni / Teardrops" (走り始めたばかりのキミに / ティアドロップス); English title is from the English-language website.) ranked tenth on the Oricon Weekly Singles Chart in December, marking the first time an anime music group appeared in an Oricon chart's top ten prior to their show beginning broadcast.

=== Launch of anime and Girls Band Party! (2017–2019) ===
Illustration from Girls Band Party! featuring the vocalists of the initial five bands

In 2017, BanG Dream! expanded to include the anime and the mobile game BanG Dream! Girls Band Party!. Prior to the latter's release, the franchise struggled to attract further fan support; in the spring, media attention was drawn to an official dōjinshi (self-published works like manga) event that saw only nine registered circles (a group of artists creating a certain work) despite organizing for 400 available circles. A lukewarm reception to the anime prompted Kidani to refocus his scope on the game; by its launch in March 16, GBP had attracted over 560,000 pre-registered players. Kidani attributed its eventual success to the collaboration with Craft Egg and Elements Garden and the inclusion of cover versions of popular songs. Four more bands—Roselia, Afterglow, Hello, Happy World!, and Pastel Palettes (stylized as Pastel＊Palettes)—were introduced with the game's arrival.

Roselia, who first appeared at Tokyo Game Show 2016, released its first single "Black Shout" on April 19, 2017. The group then enjoyed success in May 2018 when its debut album Anfang, which contained the band's first five singles, was first on the Oricon Weekly Digital and iTunes album charts; the album also sold 25,000 copies in the first week of release, the second-most on the Oricon Weekly Albums Chart. The band went through two member changes in 2018, with Yuki Nakashima replacing the retiring Yurika Endō as bassist Lisa Imai in May and Kanon Shizaki taking over for Satomi Akesaka, who left the project in September due to sensorineural hearing loss, as keyboardist Rinko Shirokane in November. In March 2020, Roselia won the 14th Seiyu Awards' Singing Award.

The vocalists for Afterglow (Ayane Sakura), Pastel Palettes (Ami Maeshima), and Hello, Happy World! (Miku Itō) were revealed during a presentation at Sunshine City, Tokyo on December 7, 2016. Afterglow's remaining cast members confirmed their involvement later in the month, while the voice actresses for the other bands were announced in a promotional event at EX Theater Roppongi on February 24, 2017. The three bands released their debut singles in 2017: Pastel Palettes' "Shuwarin Dreaming" (released July 12) ranked the highest on Oricon's weekly charts in fourth, followed by Hello, Happy World!'s "Orchestra of Smiles!" (Note: Japanese title: "Egao no Orchestra!" (えがおのオーケストラっ！); English title is from the English-language website.) (August 2) and Afterglow's "That Is How I Roll!" (September 6) in ninth and 18th, respectively.

On January 13–14, 2018, the five bands participated in the Garupa Live and Garupa Party! at Tokyo Big Sight, which included activities to promote Girls Band Party! and performances. The Third (Beta), a backup band that provided instrumentals for Afterglow, Pastel Palettes, and Hello, Happy World! at the event as their voice actresses were not musicians, eventually became a standalone unit; the tentative name was a reference to being the third live-action band in the franchise after Poppin'Party and Roselia. The group's first live took place in March, and it was officially renamed Raise A Suilen (stylized RAISE A SUILEN) in July.

BanG Dream! saw its first dual-single release day on February 21, 2018, with Poppin'Party and Roselia releasing their ninth ("CiRCLING") and fifth singles ("Opera of the wasteland"), respectively. A triple release took place on December 12 with Poppin'Party's "Kizuna Music", Roselia's "Brave Jewel", and Raise A Suilen's "R・I・O・T"; the three singles recorded top-ten Oricon Weekly Chart placements.

Poppin'Party's first album Poppin'on! came out January 30, 2019; consisting of the group's first 11 singles, it peaked at fourth on Oricon's album chart. On February 20, the franchise simultaneously released six singles, one from each band at the time; the tracks placed in the top ten on Oricon's daily chart for February 19, with Roselia's "Safe and Sound" being the highest in third.

=== Morfonica's debut and COVID-19 (2020–2021) ===
In January 2020, Poppin'Party's "Initial / Straight Through Our Dreams!", (Note: Japanese title: "Initial / Yume wo Uchinuku Shunkan ni!" (イニシャル/夢を撃ち抜く瞬間に！); English title is from the English-language website.) whose tracks serve as the theme music to the anime's third season, became BanG Dream!'s first single to top Oricon's Weekly Single Sales Chart after selling 27,000 copies from January 7 to 11. Shortly after the single's release, the franchise surpassed two million total music sales. Five months later, the BanG Dream! Girls Band Party! Cover Collection Vol. 4 ranked first on Oricon's Weekly Albums Chart with 2,231 first-week sales. Poppin'Party (Breakthrough! on June 24), Roselia (Wahl on July 15), and Raise A Suilen (Era on August 19) also released albums during the summer. "Initial / Straight Through Out Dreams!" (86th), Roselia's "Promise" (87th), and Raise A Suilen's "Drive Us Crazy" (97th) were among Billboard Japan's best-selling singles in 2020, while Wahl (62nd), Era (86th), and the fourth (93rd) and third cover collections (94th) were among the year's top albums; Wahl and Era were also respectively ranked 67th and 94th on Billboard's Hot Albums of 2020.

A seventh unit called Morfonica was introduced on March 1, 2020, to commemorate Girls Band Party!'s three-year anniversary. Morfonica is the only band in the franchise with a violinist, a distinction that was conceived by Craft Egg to better differentiate it from the others. The group's debut single "Daylight", which was released on May 27, sold over 15,000 copies in its first week and peaked at second on the Oricon Weekly Singles Chart. Morfonica's first live, Cantabile, took place on October 7.

Due to the COVID-19 pandemic, various franchise-related events since 2020 have been impacted. Breakthrough! was intended for a 3 June release before being pushed to 24 June. The BanG Dream! Special Live Girls Band Party! 2020 was originally scheduled to take place on May 3 until it was postponed to 5–6 June 2021, before being delayed again to 12 November 2022, as cases rose in Japan. A stage play focusing on Raise A Suilen titled We are Raise A Suilen: BanG Dream! The Stage, which consisted of nine performances at the Tennozu Galaxy Theater from July 15 to 19, was streamed online with unused tickets being refunded. The BanG Dream! 8th Live Summer Outdoors 3 Days, held August 21–23, admitted only a quarter of the venue's capacity. On January 9, 2021, the franchise announced Shizaki had tested positive for COVID-19, forcing her to miss the project's Raukure! and Asuhamo events at Tokyo Dome City Hall two days later. Morfonica's bassist Yūka Nishio skipped her band's Resonance performance on April 24, 2022, following a positive test.

Poppin'Party's 16th single "Photograph", which was released in January 2021, became the band's second single to rank first on the Oricon Weekly Chart.

=== Further expansion and Our Notes (2022–present) ===
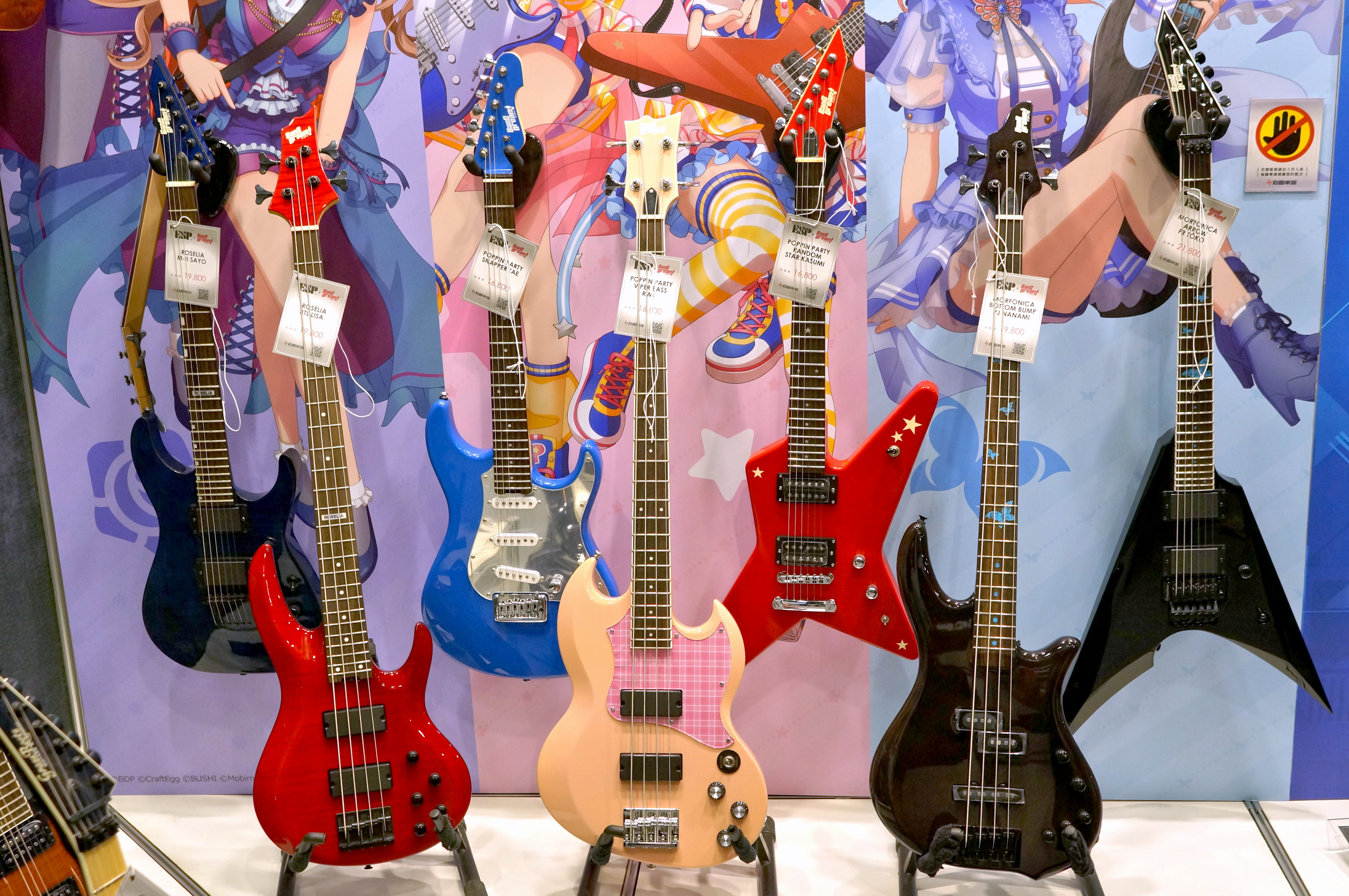
Guitars and basses from the franchise produced by ESP Guitars at the Taipei Musical Instruments Fair in 2022

Bushiroad continued to add new bands to the franchise with MyGO!!!!! and Ave Mujica in 2022 and 2023, respectively, following the concept of "synchronizing" reality and the fictional universe. While their characters were named, their voice actresses initially remained anonymous. To keep their identities hidden during their first shows, they played with limited stage lighting that covered their faces, with Ave Mujica additionally wearing cloaks. MyGO!!!!!'s voice actresses were officially revealed at their fourth live show on April 9, 2023, while Ave Mujica's voice actresses were officially revealed following the final episode of BanG Dream! It's MyGO!!!!! on September 14, 2023.

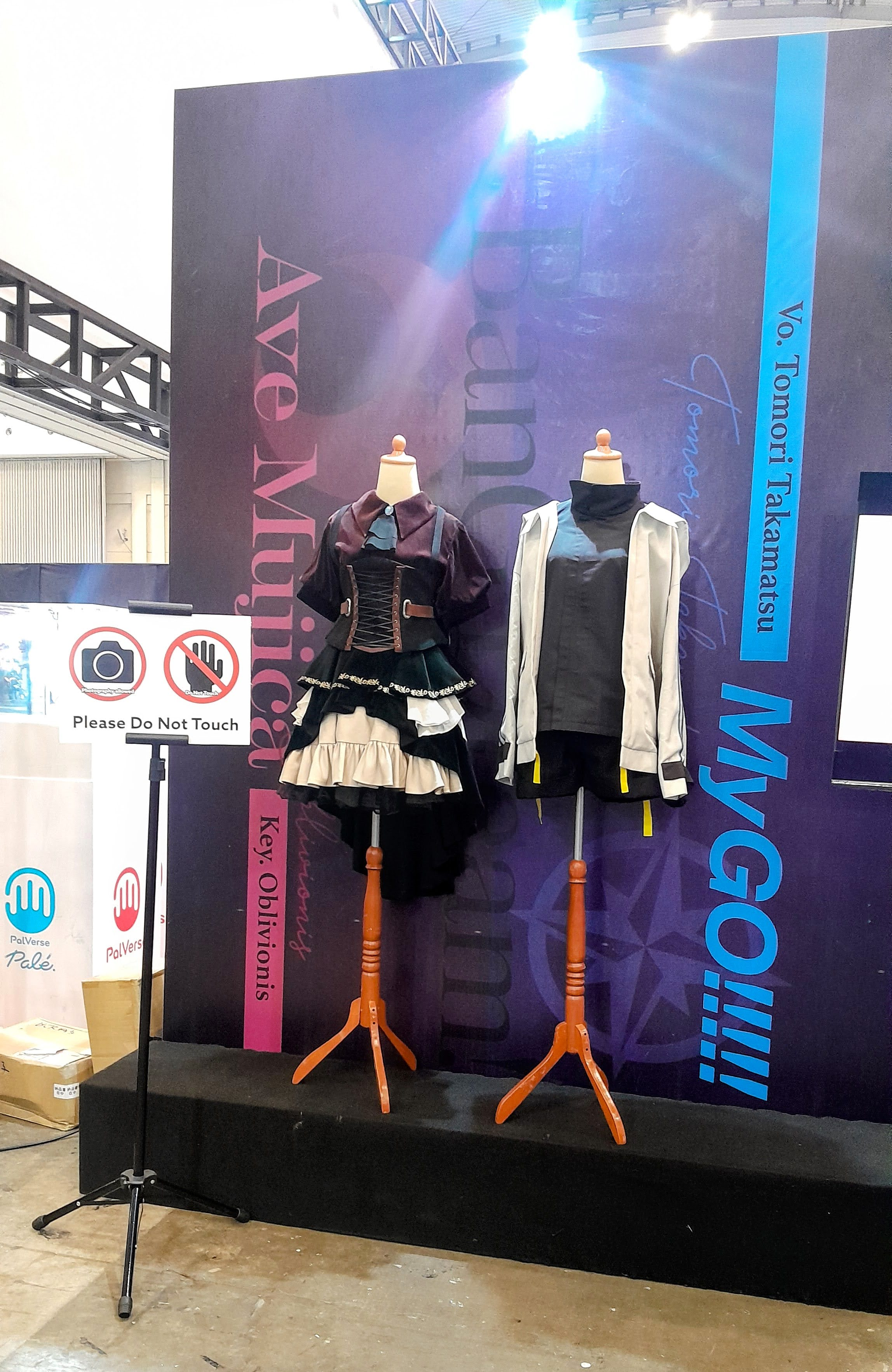
Outfits worn by Oblivionis (Kanon Takao) of Ave Mujica and Tomori Takamatsu (Hina Yōmiya) of MyGO!!!!! as displayed at Bushiroad Expo 2024 at Comic Frontier 18

The first standalone concert for MyGO!!!!! took place on July 3, 2022, with Morfonica's drummer Mika as a supporting musician, and they opened for the Special Live Girls Band Party! in November. The band released their debut single "Mayoiuta" on November 9.

Ave Mujica released their first single "Black Birthday" on April 11, 2023, followed by their introductory concert on June 4 as part of the final music festival for Nakano Sunplaza prior to its closure.

On November 30, 2022, Maeshima announced her departure from the franchise as part of a career hiatus for health reasons; she had missed the Special Live Girls Band Party! two weeks prior. Despite initial plans for Maeshima's lines as Aya will remain in the game once her successor joined the franchise, Maeshima returned to her role on September 1, 2023.

Mugendai MewType debuted in November 2023 as a VTuber band. Bushiroad's voice acting agency HiBiKi began recruiting members for the then-unnamed group in 2022, and open auditions were held from July 22 to August 14. While applicants were not required to play instruments, the final members of Mugendai MewType perform live.

On December 12, 2023, it was announced that Raise A Suilen will perform in Taipei and Shanghai for their Asia tour in March 2024.

On January 12, 2026, a second mobile game for the franchise was announced titled BanG Dream! Our Notes during the 2026 Bushiroad New Year's Grand Presentation. The game is an expansion of Girls Band Party, and features MyGO!!!!!, Ave Mujica, Mugendai MewType, and two new bands. After concern for the state of Girls Band Party! emerged after the announcement, franchise producer Nemoto Yuuki released a statement stating that Our Notes and Girls Band Party! would remain separate functioning games, and that it was not feasible to continue adding bands into the latter. MyGO!!!!! had been in Girls Band Party! since September 2023. The game launched on September 24, 2026.

The franchise's tenth anniversary show took place on February 28, 2026. All ten bands and their cast members participated.

== Media ==
=== Live concerts ===
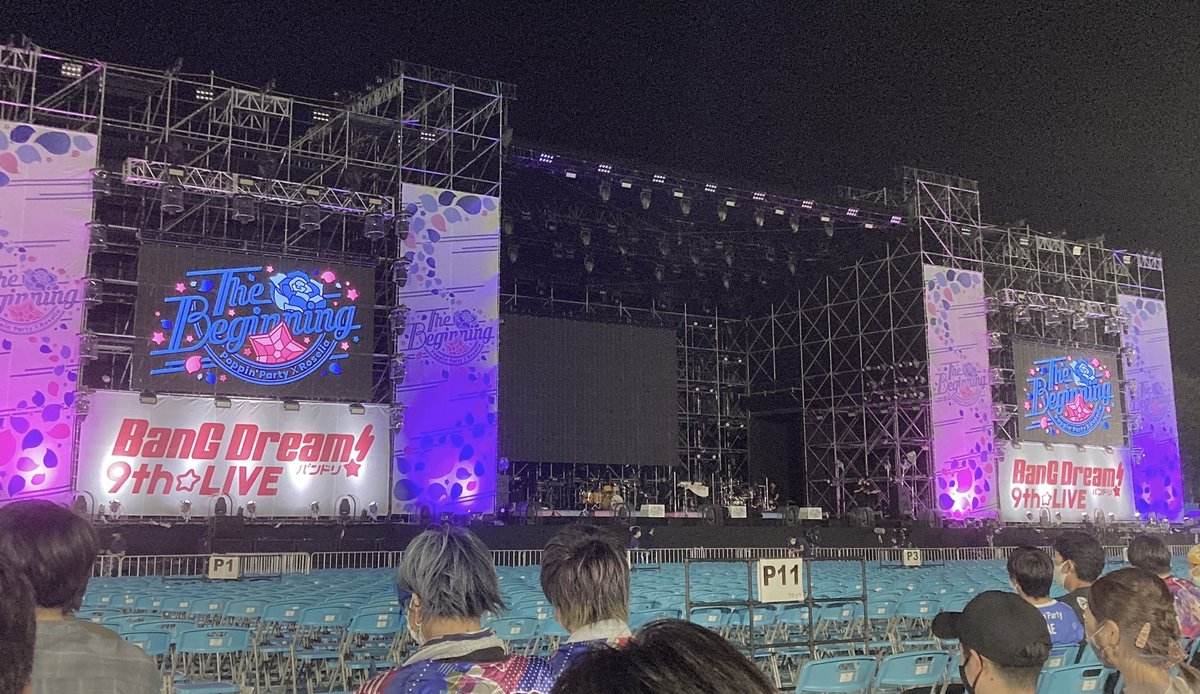
The stage for the BanG Dream! 9th Live at Fuji-Q Highland Conifer Forest on August 22, 2021

The voice actresses of Poppin'Party, Roselia, Raise A Suilen, Morfonica, MyGO!!!!!, and Ave Mujica play their respective characters' instruments during live concerts, while the other groups are limited to providing vocals. In a 2019 interview with Billboard Japan, Roselia's Haruka Kudō and Megu Sakuragawa described this distinction of being a "voice actor's band" as helping the franchise gain popularity among those unfamiliar with the game and anime, while the anime's second- and third-season director Kōdai Kakimoto explained in 2020 that his staff implements events from the live-action concerts into the show to "portray the connection between real life and anime." For example, the third season's final episode features references to the BanG Dream! 7th Live as both take place at the Nippon Budokan. The first season under Issen also incorporated elements of the performances into the plot, such as Kasumi losing her voice in one episode being based on the same occurring to Aimi during the franchise's first show.

The first BanG_Dream! concert, titled I Started a Band in Spring! and held at Shimokitazawa Garden, took place on April 18, 2015, with Aimi, Nishimoto, and Itō; the three played mainly cover songs with the exception of the original song "Yes! BanG_Dream!". In 2016, the BanG Dream! First Live Sprin'Party 2016! on April 24 marked the first performance since the franchise's rebranding to BanG Dream! The shows' increasing popularity was marked by the Second Live Starrin'Party 2016! selling out much of its tickets shortly after opening sales, while the 4th Live Miracle Party 2017! at the Budokan sold out its 11,000 tickets prior to general sale; Live Viewing Japan simulcasted the performance in 41 Japanese theaters, with showings also taking place in Hong Kong and Taiwan. Delayed screenings would also be provided for later lives; for instance, the BanG Dream! 5th Live in 2018 was shown in select North American and Australian theaters by Azoland Pictures and Madman Entertainment, respectively.

In December 2020, the franchise began streaming "Sound Only Lives", online concerts with exclusively song audio and interactions between the voice cast, on its YouTube channel. The first, Afterglow's As ever, took place on December 19 and 20, followed by Pastel Palettes' Flowerful on February 27 and 28, 2021. Hello, Happy World!'s Sound Only Live, titled Welcome to Our Music, was on May 15–16.

=== Print ===
BanG_Dream! Star Beat by Ishida and Nakamura debuted in Monthly Bushiroad on January 8, 2015. Featuring numerous differences in character traits from the current series, the manga consisted of twelve chapters and ran from the magazine's February 2015 to January 2016 issues. A light novel by Nakamura and illustrated by Hitowa, which follows Star Beat's story, was published on August 25, 2016, by ASCII Media Works under their Dengeki Bunko imprint.

A manga series following the redesigned universe, BanG Dream! by Mami Kashiwabara and Nakamura, was serialized in Monthly Bushiroad from April 2016 to February 2019. Shogakukan Asia acquired the rights to translate the manga into English in February 2017; although the company first released the manga in Southeast Asia, its license was not exclusive to the region. 2016 and 2017 saw the release of two four-panel manga with Hakuto Shiroi's Yonkoma: Bandori!, which debuted in ASCII Media Works' seinen manga magazine Dengeki G's Comic and concluded in 2017, and the surrealist Banban Doridori by Nyaromeron in Sogakukan's Coro Coro Aniki.

In 2017, the first non-Poppin'Party-centric manga, BanG Dream! Girls Band Party! Roselia Stage, was written by Pepako Dokuta and circulated in Overlap's magazine Gardo Comics from February to September. On March 2, 2020, Tokyopop announced it had licensed the series for North American release. Raise A Suilen also received a series, titled RAiSe! The story of my music, by Nakamura and art by Ryū Shihara; RAiSe! began in 2019 in Monthly Bushiroad.

An anthology series manga of the chibi anime spin-off BanG Dream! Girls Band Party! Pico was published by Bushiroad and released by Kadokawa Corporation on March 14, 2019. Titled BanG Dream! Garupa Pico Comic Anthology, the book is a compilation work from 17 artists. An online manga titled BanG Dream! Girls Band Party! The First Page, which retells event stories from the game, was released on March 16, 2021.

A manga adaptation of the BanG Dream! Yume∞Mita anime adaptation titled BanG Dream! Yume∞Mita Arale∞Arabu-ration began serialization on the Comic Growl website on July 24, 2026.

=== Anime ===
As of 2023, the franchise's mainline anime television adaptation consists of three seasons. Sentai Filmworks licenses the series for digital and home release in regions like North America, Oceania, and Europe; the company also simulcast the second and third seasons on its HIDIVE platform. In Southeast Asia and South Asia, Muse Communication holds the show's rights.

The first season, which was animated by Issen and Xebec and directed by Atsushi Ōtsuki, aired from January 21 to April 22, 2017, on Tokyo MX. It also aired on Animax during the same time. The 13-episode series follows Poppin'Party's creation and the band performs the show's opening and ending theme music "Tokimeki Experience!" and "Sparkling Dreaming: Sing Girls ". (Note: Japanese title: "Kirakira da toka Yume da toka ~Sing Girls~" (キラキラだとか夢だとか ～Sing Girls～); English title is from the English-language website.) The anime was streamed on the Anime Network and by Crunchyroll, and was later released across seven Blu-ray and DVD volumes. An original video animation episode received advanced screenings before being available on the seventh BD/DVD volume released on November 22.

Sanzigen replaced Issen and Xebec for the second and third seasons, which saw a shift to primarily computer-generated animation; in comparison, the first season only used CGI during performances to better show the nuances in playing instruments. Although CGI was the focal animation type under Sanzigen, some aspects like various articles of clothing were still drawn by hand, and motion-capture acting was utilized for performances. BanG Dream! was the first non-science fiction production by Sanzigen, who prepared for the anime by creating a music video for the Roselia song "Neo-Aspect". Kōdai Kakimoto took over as director while staff members like composition and script writer Yuniko Ayana continued their roles.

Airing from January 3 to March 28, 2019, and simulcast on Crunchyroll and HIDIVE, BanG Dream! 2nd Season increases its scope to include Afterglow, Pastel Palettes, Roselia, Hello, Happy World!, and Raise A Suilen. Unlike its predecessor, the season features a larger emphasis on concerts, which Sanzigen reflected by titling each episode after songs (the first season used "fun and cute" titles that followed a subject and verb sentence structure). It had two opening themes: "Kizuna Music" by Poppin'Party and "Brave Jewel" by Roselia, and two ending themes: "Jumpin'" by Poppin'Party and "Safe and Sound" by Roselia. An English dub of the season was released on Blu-ray and began streaming on HIDIVE on April 21, 2020; the dub was directed by John Swasey and licensed by Sentai.

The third season was originally scheduled for October 2019 before being delayed to January 2020. It details Poppin'Party's participation in the BanG Dream! Girls Band Challenge and the growth of Raise A Suilen; the premise of a competition had been entertained by the animation staff prior to beginning production on the second season. With more focus on the bands' individual development, the season's episode titles were taken from lines stated by the characters in the episodes. BanG Dream! 3rd Season aired from January 23 to April 23, 2020, though the first episode came out on January 7 as it was bundled with a limited-edition Blu-ray release for Poppin'Party's "Initial / Straight Through Our Dreams!". The single's tracks are also the season's theme music, with "Initial" as the opening and "Straight Through Our Dreams!" as the ending. Kakimoto and the previous season's staff returned for the new installment. HIDIVE's simulcast began with the January 7 premiere date, while VRV also assumed streaming rights.

==== Original net animations ====
Two chibi spin-offs called Pastel Life and BanG Dream! Girls Band Party! Pico aired in May and July 2018, respectively. Studio A-Cat worked on Pastel Life with leadership from Tommy Hino, while Pico was animated by Sanzigen in conjunction with DMM.futureworks and directed by Seiya Miyajima.

A second season of Pico titled BanG Dream! Girls Band Party! Pico: Ohmori aired from May to October 2020.

A third season of Pico titled BanG Dream! Girls Band Party! Pico Fever! aired from October 7, 2021, to March 31, 2022.

In August 2025, a new 52-episode miniseries titled Ganso! BanG Dream! Chan was revealed, and was released from October 2, 2025, to October 1, 2026, on YouTube.

==== Spin-offs and films ====
BanG Dream! Film Live, a concert movie animated by Sanzigen and starring the original five bands, premiered on September 13, 2019. The movie was directed by Tomomi Umetsu with script by Nakamura; in addition to the main cast, Kazuyuki Ueda and Elements Garden returned to reprise their roles as character designer and music producer, respectively. After opening in 56 theaters, the film grossed approximately ¥300 million at the box office in its first month. After acquiring its license in August 2020, Sentai conducted limited cinematic screenings of the movie in addition to home release. A sequel, BanG Dream! Film Live 2nd Stage, adds Morfonica and Raise A Suilen to the cast and premiered on August 20, 2021.

A two-part film series focusing on Roselia called BanG Dream! Episode of Roselia (each subtitled Promise and Song I am.) saw a theatrical release in 2021; Promise premiered on April 23, while Song I am. did so on June 25. Online streaming platform Eventive carried both movies in the United States. A Poppin'Party-centric movie titled BanG Dream! Poppin'Dream! premiered on January 1, 2022. Crunchyroll licensed both films outside of Asia.

In 2022, to commemorate Girls Band Party!'s fifth anniversary, a two-episode animation titled BanG Dream! Girls Band Party! 5th Anniversary Animation: CiRCLE Thanks Party! was released on March 10 and 17.

On March 19, 2022, it was announced that Morfonica was receiving an original anime titled BanG Dream! Morfonication, which premiered on July 28 and 29, 2022.

An anime television series centered around MyGO!!!!! that serves as the spin-off and chronological sequel to the main series, titled BanG Dream! It's MyGO!!!!!, was announced on April 9, 2023. It is directed by Kōdai Kakimoto, with Yuniko Ayana writing and supervising series scripts. It premiered on June 29, 2023, with three episodes premiering on the same day, and aired until September 14, 2023. Crunchyroll licensed the series.

On January 6, it was announced that the anime will be made into a compilation film split into two parts with new footage, revealing the two parts would be titled "Spring Sunshine, Lost Cat" and "Sing, Songs That Become Us & FILM LIVE", and is set to premiere in Japanese theaters. The two parts of the compilation film opened on September 27 and November 8, respectively.

A sequel to It's MyGO!!!!! centered around Ave Mujica, titled BanG Dream! Ave Mujica, was announced after the final episode on September 14, 2023. Kōdai Kakimoto returned to direct the sequel, with Yuniko Ayana also returning to write and supervise series scripts. It aired from January 2 to March 27, 2025. Crunchyroll licensed the series under the title Ave Mujica - The Die is Cast -.

A sequel series to both It's MyGO!!!!! and Ave Mujica was announced following the final episode of Ave Mujica on March 27, 2025. The anime, titled BanG Dream! MyGO!!!!! // Ave Mujica, is set to premiere on January 8, 2027, on the Friday Anime Night programming block on Nippon Television and its affiliates. In August 2025, it was announced that Ave Mujica would also receive a film, later titled BanG Dream! Ave Mujica prima aurora. The film was released in Japanese theaters on October 16, 2026.

An anime television series centered around Mugendai MewType, titled BanG Dream! Yume∞Mita was announced on September 7, 2025, following their 4th live at Tachikawa Stage Garden. It was produced by Nichicaline and directed by Tomomi Umetsu. It aired from July 2 to September 10, 2026, on Tokyo MX and other networks. The opening theme is "Our Survival", (Note: Japanese title: "Kore wa Boku-tachi no Seizon no Arasuji" (これはぼくたちの生存のあらすじ)) while the ending theme is "Wonder of the Universe", (Note: Japanese title: "Uchū no Fushigi" (うちゅうのふしぎ)) both performed by Mugendai MewType. Crunchyroll is streaming the series. Muse Communication licensed the series in Southeast Asia.

=== Games ===
==== Girls Band Party! ====
BanG Dream! Girls Band Party!, also known as Garupa, is a free-to-play mobile rhythm game developed by Craft Egg and published by Bushiroad's Bushimo for the Android and iOS platforms. Revealed at Tokyo Game Show 2016, it was first released in Japan on March 16, 2017. An English-language global version was launched in Singapore on March 29, 2018, followed by a worldwide release on April 4. The game was also released in traditional Chinese in Taiwan, Hong Kong, and Macao on October 19, 2017, with Mobimon Inc. serving as publisher; mainland China received its own version by bilibili on May 30, 2019. A Korean-language edition was published by Kakao Games on February 6, 2018. The Korean server ceased operations on January 31, 2024. The gameplay consists of tapping notes as they scroll toward the bottom to the rhythm of a selected song. Playable tracks include original pieces from the series and cover versions of popular anime music, the latter of which was inspired by their popularity during the BanG Dream! lives. Kidani compared the inclusion of covers to the use of mainstream series in Bushiroad's Weiß Schwarz card game as "drops in momentum" are canceled out by "the addition of popular titles." Some covers were spawned by collaborations between the game and other series such as the anime Is the Order a Rabbit? and Re:Zero − Starting Life in Another World.

An augmented reality application based on the game titled Bandori! Garupa AR! was distributed for a limited period starting January 9, 2018. In 2019, Girls Band Party! partnered with SCRAP Co. to organize "Find the Random Star!", an escape room-like game in which participants search for Kasumi's lost guitar by solving riddles located throughout the city. The event ran from December 4, 2019, to February 29, 2020, in Tokyo, Nagoya, and Osaka.

A Nintendo Switch port was released on September 16, 2021.

==== Our Notes ====
BanG Dream! Our Notes is a mobile rhythm game focusing MyGO!!!!!, Ave Mujica, Mugendai MewType as well as two new bands: Millsage and Ikka Dumb Rock!. Select members of the aforementioned upcoming bands also appeared as opening acts in MyGO!!!!! and Ave Mujica's joint live Moment × Memory in K-Arena Yokohama on March 1.

The game was launched globally on September 24, 2026. The game was developed by FROMTOKYO. Its rhythm gameplay offers three play modes—Live2D, MV, and a lightweight mode—as well as "GEKISO Live", a competitive mode in which up to five players perform the same song and are scored in accuracy-, combo-, and luck-based sections, and an assist mode for less experienced players. All story content is fully voiced, and the game launched with 100 episodes across the five bands, amounting to roughly 24 hours of story. Pre-registration opened worldwide on June 26, 2026, and surpassed two million registrations by September 20. The global version is published by Bilibili Games.

=== AI singing software ===
In Summer of 2022, Bushiroad announced the development of 夢ノ結唱 (Yumenokessho), a singing voice database trained by an AI using the singing voices of the franchises cast. The first models POPY and ROSE were trained using singing samples from Aimi and Aina Aiba respectively. Both models are compatible using CeVIO and Synthesizer V software. The database for POPY and ROSE were announced in October 2023 and officially released in December the same year.

Meanwhile, two new databases were released using the singing voices of Ami Maeshima (Pastel) and Miku Itō (Halo) respectively. A fifth database, Aver, is set for release on December 19, 2025. Announced back in April 2025, it was trained using singing samples by Rico Sasaki. An in-development version of AVER was available for trial during the Bushiroad Expo in Shanghai in July 2025.

Yumenokessho is able to produce songs in various languages such as Japanese, Chinese, Cantonese, Korean, English and Spanish. On July 16, 2025, an album entitled Cultivation was released in Japan. The album features songs created with Yumenokessho databases in its entirety. The songs were produced by various musicians including Eon Kawatani, Masayuki Nakano of Boom Boom Satellites, Shirakami Hasegawa and Mika Nakamura of Cö Shu Nie.

== Argonavis ==
In May 2018, Bushiroad revealed a male-centric project titled Argonavis from BanG Dream! (stylized as ARGONAVIS). Despite sharing the BanG Dream! name, Kidani emphasized that Argonavis takes place in a different world from the main series, meaning there would be no interactions between the characters of both projects. The titular band began performing in December; like their female counterparts, Argonavis plays their own music in addition to portraying characters. Argonavis also overlapped with the main franchise at the BanG Dream! 7th Live on February 22, 2019, where they served as the opening act for Raise A Suilen's Genesis concert. Manga artist Hikaru Miyoshi designed the characters and Nobuhiro Mōri wrote the story.

An Argonavis anime series produced by Sanzigen debuted on April 10, 2020. The Argonavis from BanG Dream! AAside mobile game, a sequel to the anime that adds additional bands, was released on January 14, 2021.

In November 2021, Bushiroad announced the project would be changed from Argonavis from BanG Dream! to From Argonavis (stylized with a lowercase "f"), spinning it off into its own subsidiary separate from the BanG Dream! franchise. A new company to manage the project, Argonavis Co., Ltd. was also established with Argonavis member Daisuke Hyūga as the public relations manager.

== Reception ==
=== General reception ===
When Girls Band Party! was released, everything just went through the roof... That's why, while there are a lot of people who thought, "Wait, how did this thing become a hit when the anime was that bad?", I think it's all because of the game's level of polish and the live shows. We accomplished something that didn't seem possible, after all.

— Bushiroad president Takaaki Kidani, in a 2018 interview with Real Sound

BanG Dream! has received worldwide acclaim for its live concerts and Girls Band Party! In 2017, Jessica Liong of ComicsVerse described the "biggest appeal" of the franchise as being "its live performers. The key, it seems, is to draw people in with anime girls and keep them with the glamor of real-life concerts." After Poppin'Party's debut single "Yes! BanG_Dream!" sold less than 1,500 copies in its first week and their second song "Star Beat!" had 3,414 in the same time frame, performances such as at Animelo Summer Live 2016 helped boost the initial-week sales of the third single "On Your New Journey / Tear Drops" to 11,301. By 2018, the band's singles regularly saw over 10,000–20,000 sales in their opening weeks.

The series has become a financial boon for Bushiroad. In 2018, it averaged over ¥4 billion in annual revenue, making it one of the company's top-producing intellectual properties. From August 2017 to July 2018, Bushiroad's Weiß Schwarz brand experienced record sales after adding BanG Dream! cards to its collection. Girls Band Party! grossed ¥31.2 billion ($197.07 million) between 2017 and 2018, including ¥9.1 billion in 2017 and ¥22.1 billion in 2018; during the latter year, the game was the 15th-most successful mobile game and the second-most successful rhythm game in Japan in terms of revenue, only behind The Idolmaster Cinderella Girls: Starlight Stage. BanG Dream! has also collaborated with various entities for promotions like Pacific League baseball, the Lawson convenience store chain, and Seiko watches.

=== Anime reception ===
The main anime has garnered mixed but gradually improving reception over time. Although the first season had lukewarm responses, the second and third have been regarded in a more positive light by reviewers. Chris Beveridge of The Fandom Post, who reviewed the first two seasons, praised the franchise's preparation for the anime's later seasons by producing other media to flesh out the setting rather than hastily creating additional seasons.

The first season was one of the most-discussed shows on Japanese social media during the winter 2017 season. However, it received mediocre reviews with particular criticism aimed at its plot. In a "C−"-grade critique, Anime News Network's Christopher Farris described the story as being "one of the downright emptiest [he had] seen in anime in a long while", citing the lack of true adversity faced by the characters. Opinions on the animation and design were divided, with Farris calling it "a great-looking product overall" while Otaku USA writer Brittany Vincent—who noted other music shows like Love Live! also use CGI—wrote they "don't look particularly great". Although Vincent praised the show for having "a lot of heart", she added "there are more inspired choices out there" for music anime. Beveridge expressed his pleasure with the cast's realism, though he stressed the viewer's opinion of the characters "will make or break the show." He ultimately described BanG Dream! as a "solid and serviceable show that felt like a lot of other girl band shows." In a 2018 interview with Real Sound, Kidani admitted the unenthusiastic reception from Japanese audiences led him to shift his investment to promoting Girls Band Party! before its release.

Among Western reviewers, the second season was generally seen as an improvement story- and animation-wise. In an article for Polygon, Julia Lee listed the season as one of "six new anime series to watch this winter", praising the emphasis on the new bands and the switch to CGI "without losing much of the artistic style that made the first (season) pop." Farris questioned the inclusion of new characters without much introduction, writing it was a jarring transition for those unfamiliar to Girls Band Party! Nevertheless, he commended its emotional impact and increase in musical numbers, grading the season as a "C+" as he felt there were "still a lot of caveats to iron out before it can be called a true success for all but the most devoted." Beveridge praised the season's performances for its fluid animation and "infectious energy" in the songs, and added that although he was not invested in the individual characters, he found it "incredibly easy to be engaged from episode to episode and enjoy the journey."

The third season enjoyed favorable responses from writers like Farris and The Fandom Post's Shawn Hacaga, the former issuing a "B+" grade and the latter—who considers himself a fan of the franchise—writing reviews for each episode. Describing the season as "a generally solid show in its own right," Farris praised the storyline for its concrete emphasis on the three main bands (Poppin'Party, Roselia, and Raise A Suilen) and its success in promoting the franchise's premise that "playing in a band with your friends for fun is the ultimate goal of performing". Hacaga lauded Raise A Suilen's story, prompting him to regard the season as exceeding his expectations in his review of the fourth and fifth episodes, and described the bands' growths throughout the season as "an absolute joy" to watch in his final critique.

== Discography ==
Thirteen bands (Poppin'Party, Roselia, Afterglow, Pastel Palettes, Hello, Happy World!, Raise A Suilen, Morfonica, MyGO!!!!!, Ave Mujica, Mugendai MewType, millsage, Ikka Dumb Rock!, and Glitter Green) have each released singles and albums, the latter of which include original and cover songs. Glitter Green's lone single "Don't be afraid!", which was used as an insert song for the anime's first season, was released in collaboration with Tantei Opera Milky Holmes.

Kō Nakamura and Elements Garden's Asuka Oda serve as the franchise's primary lyricists, with the former writing lyrics for most Poppin'Party songs while the latter does so for the others. Elements Garden's other members such as Noriyasu Agematsu and Junpei Fujita also compose and arrange music for the series. In 2021, the project introduced a series of "tie-up" partnership songs that are written and composed by artists outside of Elements Garden; the first song, "Introduction" performed by Poppin'Party, was the creation of Yoasobi's Ayase. Afterglow also teamed up with the band Flow for the song "Winner" as part of Flow's single "Dice".

Various songs from BanG Dream! have been used as theme music for other Bushiroad properties. Poppin'Party's "Excellent (Hey, Let's Go!)" (Note: Japanese title: "Saa Ikō (Let's Go)!" (最高(さあ行こう)！); English title is from the English-language website.) and "B.O.F." served as an opening and ending theme for the Future Card Buddyfight series, respectively; Aimi and Nishimoto also voiced characters in the show. In 2020, Raise A Suilen performed the opening "Sacred world" for the anime Assault Lily Bouquet. The following year, RAS' "Exist" and "Embrace of light" were the themes to Joran: The Princess of Snow and Blood. In July, Poppin'Party and Argonavis performed the theme songs "A Song No More" (Note: Japanese title: "Koko Kara Saki wa Uta ni Naranai" (ここから先は歌にならない); English title is from the English-language website.) and "Possibility", respectively, for Remake Our Life!; Aimi and Argonavis' Masahiro Itō also starred in the show. Poppin'Party's "Moonlight Walk" was also used as the ending for The Fruit of Evolution.

The Cardfight!! Vanguard series has also made regular use of the franchise's music for theme songs. Its 2018 reboot saw Roselia perform the opening "Legendary" and ending "Heroic Advent" (the latter appearing in the G: Z arc), while RAS was responsible for one of the reboot's endings "Unstoppable" and Cardfight!! Vanguard: High School Arc Cont.'s themes with "Invincible Fighter" and "Takin' My Heart". In 2021, the first season of Cardfight!! Vanguard overDress respectively featured Roselia's "ZEAL of proud" and Argonavis' "Y" as its opening and ending, while the second season utilized Morfonica's "Fateful..." as an ending. The 2018 Cardfight!! spin-off Bermuda Triangle: Colorful Pastrale had the Pastel Palettes song "Wonderland Girl" as its opening. In June 2024, MyGO!!!!!'s "Panorama" was also used as the ending for Cardfight!! Vanguard DivineZ 2nd Season. In April 2026, Mugendai Mewtype's "Yawayawa Nerd Chō FreQuency" was also used as the ending for Ichijyoma Mankitsu Gurashi!.
