= List of Magical Girl Lyrical Nanoha episodes =

The following is a list of episodes for the Magical Girls Lyrical Nanoha anime franchise, which spawned from the Triangle Heart eroge series. The series follows a girl named Nanoha Takamachi who one day becomes a magical girl, facing off against various other magical foes throughout the series.

The first season, Magical Girl Lyrical Nanoha, was directed by Akiyuki Shinbo at Seven Arcs and aired in Japan between October 1, 2004, and December 24, 2004. The opening theme is "Innocent Starter" by Nana Mizuki while the ending theme is "Little Wish ~lyrical step~" by Yukari Tamura. The second season, Magical Girl Lyrical Nanoha A's, aired between October 1, 2005, and December 24, 2005, once again produced by Seven Arcs but now directed by Keizō Kusakawa. The opening theme is "Eternal Blaze" by Mizuki while the ending theme is "Spiritual Garden" by Tamura. Both Nanoha and Nanoha A's were released on DVD in North America by Geneon USA in May 2009. The third season, Magical Girl Lyrical Nanoha Strikers, aired in Japan between April 1, 2007, and September 24, 2007, once again directed by Kusakawa at Seven Arcs. The series is set ten years after the events of A's and introduces a new cast of characters joining the previous cast. The opening themes are "Secret Ambition" for episodes 1-17 and "Massive Wonders" for episodes 18 onwards, both performed by Mizuki. The ending themes are "Hoshizora no Spica" (星空のSpica) for episodes 1-14 and "Beautiful Amulet" for episodes 15 onwards, both performed by Tamura.

An anime based on the Magical Girl Lyrical Nanoha ViVid manga series written by Masaki Tsuzuki aired in Japan between April 3, 2015, and June 19, 2015, directed by Yuuki Itoh at A-1 Pictures. Set four years after StrikerS, the series focuses on Nanoha's adopted daughter, Vivio Takamachi, as she participates in magical tournaments. The opening theme is "Angel Blossom" by Mizuki while the ending theme is "Pleasure Treasure" by Tamura. A spin-off series titled ViVid Strike!, directed by Junji Nishimura at Seven Arcs, aired in Japan between October 2, 2016, and December 17, 2016, and was simulcast in the United Kingdom by Amazon Video. The series focuses on a martial artist named Fuuka Reventon as she trains to become stronger. The opening theme is "Future Strike" by Yui Ogura while the ending theme is "Starry Wish" by Inori Minase.

== Magical Girl Lyrical Nanoha series ==
Season	Episodes	Originally released	
Season	Episodes	First released	Last released
1	13	October 1, 2004	December 24, 2004
2	13	October 1, 2005	December 24, 2005
3	26	April 1, 2007	September 23, 2007
4	12	April 3, 2015	June 19, 2015
5	12	October 1, 2016	December 17, 2016

=== Magical Girl Lyrical Nanoha (2004) ===
No. overall	No. in season	Title (Note: English episode titles are taken from Amazon Video.)	Original release date
1	1	"Is This What You Call a "Mysterious Encounter?""; Transliteration: "Sore wa Fushigi na Deai nano?" (Japanese: それは不思議な出会いなの?)	October 1, 2004
Nanoha was just an ordinary third grader with no special skills when she heard a call for help. Then Nanoha comes to Yūno's rescue, and in doing so was given Raising Heart and awakened the power that had lain dormant inside of her.
2	2	"My Magical Incantation is "Lyrical"?"; Transliteration: "Mahō no Jumon wa Ririkaru nano?" (Japanese: 魔法の呪文はリリカルなの?)	October 8, 2004
Nanoha defeats her first monster, showing incredible talent, and joins Yūno on his quest to find the magical Jewel Seeds.
3	3	"This Town's in a Lot of Danger?"; Transliteration: "Machi wa Kiken ga Ippai nano?" (Japanese: 街は危険がいっぱいなの?)	October 15, 2004
A Jewel Seed mutates into a giant tree, but Nanoha locates and seals the seed.
4	4	"A Rival!? Another Magical Girl!"; Transliteration: "Raibaru!? Mō Hitori no Mahō Shōjo nano!" (Japanese: ライバル!?もうひとりの魔法少女なの!)	October 22, 2004
Nanoha meets Fate, a rival for the Jewel Seeds, and is defeated.
5	5	"This is a Town of Hot Water, Uminari Hot Springs!"; Transliteration: "Koko wa Yu no Machi, Uminari Onsen nano" (Japanese: ここは湯のまち、海鳴温泉なの)	October 29, 2004
Fate and her familiar Aruf challenge Nanoha at a hot spring.
6	6	"Feelings that Can't Be Understood?"; Transliteration: "Wakariaenai Kimochi nano?" (Japanese: わかりあえない気持ちなの?)	November 5, 2004
Arisa suspects that Nanoha is hiding something and becomes angry with her. Nanoha faces Fate again, in an attempt to convey her feelings to her.
7	7	"Is This a Third Magician?"; Transliteration: "Sannin me no Mahōtsukai nano?" (Japanese: 三人目の魔法使いなの?)	November 12, 2004
Fate's mother, Precia, the real villain is revealed, and she is seeking the Jewel Seeds to go to Al Hazard. Nanoha and Fate fight again, but the two are interrupted by Chrono Harlaown, a mage from the Time-Space Administration Bureau.
8	8	"There's A Really Big Crisis?"; Transliteration: "Sore wa Ōinaru Kiki nano?" (Japanese: それは大いなる危機なの?)	November 19, 2004
After Fate escapes, Nanoha joins with the Time-Space Administration Bureau. Yūno reveals his human form to Nanoha.
9	9	"The Decisive Battle Above the Ocean!"; Transliteration: "Kessen wa Umi no Ue de nano" (Japanese: 決戦は海の上でなの)	November 26, 2004
When Fate tries to use a dangerous method of gathering the six Jewel Seeds in the ocean, the TSAB plans to ambush her once she is finished and weakened, but Nanoha intervenes to help Fate overcome the process. They manage to seal the six Jewel Seeds, but Precia intervenes, causing TSAB to take three seeds and Fate to lose the other three, forcing her to retreat.
10	10	"Oaths of the Heart"; Transliteration: "Sorezore no Mune no Chikai nano" (Japanese: それぞれの胸の誓いなの)	December 3, 2004
Aruf attacks Precia in anger over how she treats Fate, but is defeated and thrown out. She transports to Earth and is found by Arisa, who nurses her back home. Aruf explains Precia's true motives to TSAB and asks Nanoha to save Fate. Nanoha visits her friends and family, to sort everything out, and decides to have one final battle with Fate.
11	11	"Memories Beyond Time"; Transliteration: "Omoide wa Toki no Kanata nano" (Japanese: 思い出は時の彼方なの)	December 10, 2004
Nanoha and Fate battle for all the Jewel Seeds. Despite being evenly matched, Nanoha wins the fight, but Precia steals Fate's Jewel Seeds back. Fate is taken captive, while TSAB manages to pinpoint Precia's location. They attempt to arrest her, but she incapacitates them. It is revealed that Fate's memories of the past were copied, and that she is a clone of Presea's biological daughter, Alicia. Fate does not take this news too well and collapses after Precia shows that she truly hates her. Precia activates the Jewel Seeds in her possession to go to Al Hazard and resurrect Alicia. This action causes a massive dimensional disturbance, and the Garden of Time begins to fall apart.
12	12	"When Our Fate is Sealed"; Transliteration: "Shukumei ga Tojiru Toki nano" (Japanese: 宿命が閉じるときなの)	December 17, 2004
In the final battle, the TSAB march on the Garden of Time to stop Precia from using the Jewel Seeds in an attempt to reach Al Hazard. With her identity, memories, and motivation shattered, Fate falls into despair. However, with the encouragement of Arf, Bardiche and Nanoha, she decided to stop living in the past, live a better live from now on, reaffirm her feelings as real, and joins the battle to help Nanoha and to seal the reactor. Fate attempts to save Precia, but is rejected by her as she chooses to be with the preserved body of Alicia.
13	13	"Call My Name"; Transliteration: "Namae o Yonde" (Japanese: なまえをよんで)	December 24, 2004
Precia falls into the dimensional void after her attempt to reach Al Hazard fails, seemingly dying in the process, and the heroes evacuate the Garden of Time before it is destroyed. Fate stays with the TSAB to be tried for her crimes, although she is expected to be given leniency considering the circumstances. Nanoha and Yūno say their farewells to the TSAB and they both head home. Fate meets with Nanoha, and the two officially become friends.

=== Magical Girl Lyrical Nanoha A's (2005) ===
No. overall	No. in season	Title	Original release date
14	1	"The Beginning Comes Suddenly"; Transliteration: "Hajimari wa Totsuzen ni nano" (Japanese: はじまりは突然になの)	October 1, 2005
Nanoha, who is awaiting Fate's return, is ambushed by Vita and Graf Eisen for her Linker Core. Vita gains the advantage by using magical cartridges to increase her weapon's power. At the last minute when all seems hopeless Fate, Aruf and Yūno arrive.
15	2	"The Storm of Battle, Once Again"; Transliteration: "Tatakai no Arashi, Futatabi nano" (Japanese: 戦いの嵐、ふたたびなの)	October 8, 2005
Nanoha and Fate fight the much stronger Wolkenritter (Cloud Knights), and in the end Nanoha loses her Linker Core to the enemy while both Raising Heart and Bardiche are in severely damaged states.
16	3	"Reunion and Moving!"; Transliteration: "Saikai, Soshite Ohikkoshi nano!" (Japanese: 再会､そしてお引っ越しなの!)	October 15, 2005
With what happened to Nanoha the Arthra crew has been assigned the mission of stopping the Wolkenritter, and with the Arthra being upgraded the captain's team consisting of Admiral Lindy, Chrono, Amy and Fate move into Nanoha's neighborhood for the time being. At the end of the episode Raising Heart and Bardiche demand a new and dangerous modification to their design.
17	4	"Our New Power, Activate!"; Transliteration: "Aratanaru Chikara, Kidō nano!" (Japanese: 新たなる力、起動なの!)	October 22, 2005
Hayate's condition worsens, the TSAB corner the Wolkenritter in a barrier so Nanoha and Fate can take them on, to Nanoha and Fate's surprise Raising Heart and Bardiche begin a different Set Up. Amy tells them that their devices have been upgraded from Raising Heart to Raising Heart Excellion and from Bardiche to Bardiche Assault.
18	5	"It was a Small Wish (part 1)"; Transliteration: "Sore wa Chiisa na Negai nano (Zenpen)" (Japanese: それは小さな願いなの (前編))	October 29, 2005
Signum breaks into the TSAB barrier to help out her teammates with a fight soon following. Nanoha and Fate gain the advantage over their opponents, but a mysterious man arrives to help, and Shamal sacrifices some of the Book of Darkness's pages in order to destroy the barrier and allow the Wolkenritter to escape. It is revealed that the Wolkenritter are programs of the Book of Darkness.
19	6	"It was a Small Wish (part 2)"; Transliteration: "Sore wa Chiisa na Negai nano (Kōhen)" (Japanese: それは小さな願いなの (後編))	November 5, 2005
Signum and Shamal recall coming into Hayate's service, and how the love she showed them caused them to develop emotions. While she asked them not to fight, they eventually realized that unless the Book was completed, her life would be endangered, and decided to gather mana for that purpose. At TSAB headquarters, Chrono and Amy take Yuuno to meet Admiral Graham's familiars: the Lieze Twins, twin catgirls who are respective experts in magical and physical combat. They express regrets over being too busy with their duties to help in the Book of Darkness case. Chrono says he wants a different favor from them, and asks if they can help Yuuno search for information in the Infinity Library.
20	7	"With the Broken Past and Present"; Transliteration: "Kowareta Kako to Genzai to nano" (Japanese: 壊れた過去と現在となの)	November 12, 2005
The Liese twins show Yuuno to the Infinity Library, a repository of knowledge from every world supervised by the Bureau. Unfortunately, much of its information isn't properly catalogued, which makes it hard to find anything specific. Yuuno, being an archaeologist from a family of historians, says he's good at searching out what he needs. Fate and Nanoha again confront Signum and Vita, trying to get them to reveal their motivations. The mysterious man protects Vita from Nanoha's attack, allowing her to escape and then intervenes in Signum's fight with Fate, stealing Fate's Linker Core and incapacitating her.
21	8	"A Sad Resolve, And A Courageous Choice"; Transliteration: "Kanashī Ketsui, Yūki no Sentaku nano" (Japanese: 悲しい決意、勇気の選択なの)	November 19, 2005
The Wolkenritter discuss the mysterious masked man who's been helping them, suspecting that he wants the Book of Darkness completed for reasons of his own. Vita, distrusting the man, questions their actions and asks if Hayate will really be happy when the Book is completed, but then, Hayate's condition once again worsens, and she is hospitalized after collapsing at home. The TSAB realize that the Book of Darkness is going to kill Hayate upon its completion. Nanoha and Fate visit Hayate in the hospital through Suzuka, a mutual friend.
22	9	"Christmas Eve"; Transliteration: "Kurisumasu Ibu" (Japanese: クリスマス·イブ)	November 26, 2005
Chrono continues his research on the Book of Darkness. On Christmas Eve, Nanoha and Fate give Hayate a surprise visit, and encounter the Wolkenritter in the hospital room, learning of their connection to her and realizing she is their Master. The groups fight that night on the hospital roof, but the two masked men intervene yet again, drain the Wolkenritter's Linker cores, killing them and summoning Hayate to the roof while disguised as Nanoha and Fate, telling her that even if the Book of Darkness was completed, it would kill her not save her, realizing that the Wolkenritter's effort to save her was all for nothing. They then kill Vita in front of her to force her to awaken the Book of Darkness, revealing her true form.
23	10	"Destiny"; Transliteration: "Unmei" (Japanese: 運命)	December 3, 2005
Hayate is engulfed by the Book's power. The two masked men keep an eye on things as they prepare to take action of their own. Suddenly, magical binds appear, trapping them before they have a chance to react. Chrono appears and removes their disguises, revealing that they are the Lieze twins. Taking them back to TSAB headquarters, Chrono confronts Admiral Graham in his office and exposes him that he had planned for Hayate to complete the Tome of Darkness in order to seal it and her away. Conceding that his plan has been foiled, Graham gives Chrono the magical device he had prepared to use against the Book, Durandal, the Staff of Freezing. While Arisa and Suzuka learn the truth about Nanoha and Fate, Fate gets absorbed by the Book of Darkness.
24	11	"A Present For Christmas"; Transliteration: "Seiya no Okurimono" (Japanese: 聖夜の贈り物)	December 10, 2005
Fate is trapped in a dream of an ideal life with Alicia and a sane Precia, but manages to break free and then activates her full drive Zanber Blade. While on the outside Nanoha activates her full drive Excellion Mode despite the fact that it could destroy Raising Heart. Hayate reaches out to the Book of Darkness, renaming it Reinforce and becoming the first person to wake up when the Book of Darkness had been completed.
25	12	"Evening's End, Journey's End"; Transliteration: "Yoru no Owari, Tabi no Owari" (Japanese: 夜の終わり、旅の終わり)	December 17, 2005
Hayate regains control of Reinforce, and revives the Wolkenritter. The Wolkenritter and Hayate team up with Nanoha's group to defeat the corrupted defense program of the Tome of Darkness.
26	13	"Stand By, Ready"; Transliteration: "Sutanbai redī" (Japanese: スタンバイ·レディ)	December 24, 2005
Although the danger is averted, the potential for the corruption to return remains, and Reinforce gives up her existence in order to prevent that. Hayate and the Wolkenritter join the TSAB, and Nanoha tells her family about what she has been doing as a mage. Six years later, Nanoha, Fate and Hayate are in middle school, with Hayate having a second Reinforce by her side.

=== Magical Girl Lyrical Nanoha StrikerS (2007) ===
No. overall	No. in season	Title	Original release date
27	1	"Wings To The Sky"; Transliteration: "Sora e no Tsubasa" (Japanese: 空への翼)	April 1, 2007
The story starts by showing an airport in Mid-Childa on fire. Inside the airport, as a statue was about to crush a young girl, Nanoha flies in and saves her. Four years later, Subaru Nakajima and Teana Lanster are taking a test to increase their rank from C to B. During the test, Nanoha, Fate, Hayate, and Rein observe their progress. Near the end of the test, Teana injures her ankle, but they don't give up and with Teana riding on Subaru's back, Subaru races for the finish line. They cross the finish line but they were going so fast that they would've crashed into a wall if Nanoha hadn't saved them. In the end Subaru reunites with Nanoha after four years.
28	2	"Riot Force 6"; Transliteration: "Kidō Rokka" (Japanese: 機動六課)	April 8, 2007
Subaru and Teana are informed that they have failed their promotion exam, but are given another chance by Nanoha and Reinforce to take the exam again in a week. In the meantime, they are told about the Sixth Mobile Division, which is a special division about to be formed and led by Nanoha, Fate, and Hayate and are asked to join. Erio and Caro make an appearance and meet for the first time. At the end we see Vita, Shamal and Zafira destroying gadget drones and talking about the new unit.
29	3	"Gathering"; Transliteration: "Shūketsu" (Japanese: 集結)	April 15, 2007
Hayate's dream of this new unit has finally been realized and the training begins for the new recruits. We meet new faces like Griffith Lowran, Alto Krauetta, Vice Granscenic, Shario(Shari) Finieno and Lucino Liilie are introduced which gives insight into the new villain's plot involving the Lost Logia named Relic.
30	4	"First Alert"; Transliteration: "Fāsuto Arāto" (Japanese: ファースト·アラート)	April 22, 2007
Subaru, Teana, Caro, and Erio are still enduring hard training with Nanoha, but soon their training will be complete. Subaru and Teana are given new devices to aid them and Erio and Caro are given upgrades to their devices and the power-limiting feature is explained to them. Afterwards, the Sixth Mobile Division must act on their first mission.
31	5	"Stars and Lightning"; Transliteration: "Hoshi to Ikazuchi" (Japanese: 星と雷)	April 29, 2007
This episode marks the first mission of the new teams, as they battle several gadget drones and a new model gadget drone to recover a Lost Logia. Subaru and the others get to test out their new and/or improved devices. Part of Caro's past is revealed, as well as her true ability to summon dragons. Someone is monitoring them from a lab, gathering data mostly on Fate and Erio, who have a connection with "Project F".
32	6	"Development"; Transliteration: "Shinten" (Japanese: 進展)	May 6, 2007
Stars and Lightning undergo further training, intended to enhance their strengths and skills. Meanwhile, Hayate requests the aid of Major Genya Nakajima's 108th Ground Forces Battalion to assist Mobile Division 6 in investigating smuggling routes. Fate and Shari discover that a Doctor Jail Scaglietti is implanting Jewel Seeds into the Type-3 gadgets.
33	7	"Hotel Augusta"; Transliteration: "Hoteru Agusuta" (Japanese: ホテル·アグスタ)	May 13, 2007
The Sixth Mobile Division monitors, and provides security for, the Hotel Augusta, where works of art, including lost logia, are up for auction. Teams Stars and Lightning face gadget drones, and another summoner who has ties to Dr. Scaglietti. Feeling inadequate compared to the strength of many of the other Section 6 members, Teana tries a dangerous tactic to prove her worth, and almost hits Subaru.
34	8	"A Wish, Together"; Transliteration: "Negai, Futari de" (Japanese: 願い、ふたりで)	May 20, 2007
Following the averted friendly-fire incident at the Hotel Augusta, Teana throws herself into intensive training, and it is revealed that she is struggling to fulfill the dream her brother once had of becoming an enforcer. Subaru joins her, and they devise a dangerous strategy for their next combat exercise with Nanoha. The strategy fails, and when Teana tries to attack Nanoha, Nanoha shoots her and knocks her unconscious.
35	9	"Precious Things"; Transliteration: "Taisetsu na Koto" (Japanese: たいせつなこと)	May 27, 2007
Teana wakes up in the infirmary many hours after being on the receiving end of Nanoha's attack. She and the other young recruits learn about Nanoha's past and how she almost died several years ago on a mission due to having overextended herself, causing Teana to understand Nanoha's training methods.
36	10	"Riot Force 6's Day Off (Part 1)"; Transliteration: "Kidō Rokka no Aru Kyūjitsu (Zenpen)" (Japanese: 機動六課のある休日(前編))	June 3, 2007
Subaru, Teana, Caro, and Erio are on their vacation. Suddenly, Erio senses a magical presence, and follows it. To Erio and Caro's surprise, they see a girl coming out of the sewers with a relic case on her leg.
37	11	"Riot Force 6's Day Off (Part 2)"; Transliteration: "Kidō Rokka no Aru Kyūjitsu (Kōhen)" (Japanese: 機動六課のある休日(後編))	June 10, 2007
Nanoha, Fate, Shamal, Teana, and Subaru come to aid Caro and Erio. Erio, Caro, Teana, and Subaru go down the sewer to investigate. They meet up with Subaru's sister, Ginga, but things take a turn for the worse when Lutecia attacks in the sewers with the powerful insect Garyu.
38	12	"Numbers"; Transliteration: "Nanbāzu" (Japanese: ナンバーズ)	June 17, 2007
Everyone is under attack, and Hayate comes to help. Lutecia and her companions come to get the relic, while Numbers cyborgs Quattro and Dieci attack the helicopter with the girl. The forwards manage to capture Lutecia, but Sein manages to rescue her and retrieve the relic case, only to later discover that the forwards had already removed the contents.
39	13	"The Reason of Life"; Transliteration: "Inochi no Riyū" (Japanese: 命の理由)	June 24, 2007
Explained how Agito joined Lutecia and the reason why Hayate created Mobile Section Six as a way of addressing a prophecy in the Saint Church.
40	14	"Mothers & Children" (Japanese: Mothers&Children)	July 1, 2007
Nanoha decided to be Vivio's temporary guardian and Fate volunteers to assist her.
41	15	"Sisters & Daughters" (Japanese: Sisters & Daughters)	July 8, 2007
Ginga transfers to Mobile Division Section Six where she begins to train with the forwards. The episode also gives some insight into the Numbers.
42	16	"That Day, Section Six (Part 1)"; Transliteration: "Sono Hi, Kidō Rokka (Zenpen)" (Japanese: その日、機動六課 (前編))	July 15, 2007
Sixth Mobile Division is on a mission to protect the TSAB Public Press Conference. The commanders, including Nanoha, Fate, Hayate, and Signum are inside without their devices, which they entrust to the forwards. Meanwhile, Jail Scaglietti and his Numbers, along with Lutecia and Zest, are working on their plan.
43	17	"That Day, Section Six (Part 2)"; Transliteration: "Sono Hi, Kidō Rokka (Kōhen)" (Japanese: その日、機動六課 (後編))	July 22, 2007
Sixth Mobile Division is engaged battle with Scaglietti's group of terrorists. Vita fights against Zest and is defeated. Fate fights Tre and Sette, who cryptically hint at her connection with Scaglietti. Ginga is severely wounded and is captured by several of the Numbers, causing Subaru to go berserk and severely injure Cinque. The enemy forces destroy the Section 6 HQ and capture Vivio.
44	18	"Wings, Once Again"; Transliteration: "Tsubasa, Futatabi" (Japanese: 翼、ふたたび)	July 29, 2007
After the attack on the 6th Division Headquarters, Hayate decides to move all the units on to the Arthra. It is revealed that the Nakajima family had adopted Ginga and Subaru a long time ago, as they were experimental Type-0 Cyborgs, the Numbers' predecessors. Although they still needed the maintenance treatment like the other cyborgs until now, they were still treated kindly as normal girls. Nanoha tried to act the same as before in front of the whole squad but couldn't hide it when Fate asked her. Fate tried to comfort the crying Nanoha saying that they will definitely rescue Vivio. The numbers talk about how strong Subaru was and the episode ends with a terrified Vivio crying out for her Mom while Scagiletti is about to experiment on her.
45	19	"Cradle"; Transliteration: "Yurikago" (Japanese: ゆりかご)	August 5, 2007
After Subaru recovers from her injuries, she moves onto the plan for Mach Caliber to be powered-up in order to endure her cyborg power. At that time, Scaglietti and his comrades are working on the next step of their plan involving Vivio's power. It is also shown that Ginga has seemingly joined Scaglietti as number 13.
46	20	"Infinite Greed"; Transliteration: "Mugen no Yokubō" (Japanese: 無限の欲望)	August 12, 2007
Jail Scaglietti has awakened the Saint's Cradle, an ancient Belkan weapon controlled by Vivio. The TSAB, with Sixth Mobile Division, are going to stop it. There is also the first movement of No.2, Due, as the spy inside the TSAB.
47	21	"Decisive Battle"; Transliteration: "Kessen" (Japanese: 決戦)	August 19, 2007
From Yūno's research, The Saint's Cradle is expected to be unstoppable if it reaches orbit and absorbs the power of two moons. Nanoha and Vita invade the Cradle, Hayate attempts to deal with the units outside, and Fate attacks Scaglietti's hideout. Signum and Rein go to battle Knight Zest and Agito, while the forwards fight the cyborgs and Lutecia on the ground.
48	22	"Pain to Pain"; Transliteration: "Itami no Itami" (Japanese: 痛みの痛み)	August 26, 2007
Nanoha is on her way to the throne room where Vivio and Quattro are supposed to be. Vita is struggling on her way to the machine room, fighting with gadgets. Fate starts her battles in Scaglietti's HQ with Tre, Sette and Scaglietti himself. Meanwhile, Teana is trapped on her own against the three of the Numbers. Subaru fights against Ginga, who was re-programmed, and Caro and Erio are fighting against Garyū and Lutecia.
49	23	"Stars Strike"; Transliteration: "Sutā Sutoraiku" (Japanese: スターストライク)	September 2, 2007
Nanoha reaches Vivio after easily defeating Dieci, but Quattro taunts the two, and Vivio activates a rainbow shield, which Quattro calls the Saint's Armor, an extremely powerful shield. Meanwhile, the barrier around the building where Teana is fighting is broken when Shamal and Zafira capture Otto, and Teana defeats the three Numbers with help from Vice. Subaru struggles against her sister, and recalls her previous reluctance to fight, but resolves to save Ginga, and manages to defeat her.
50	24	"Lightning"; Transliteration: "Raikō" (Japanese: 雷光)	September 9, 2007
This episode reveals that Subaru and Lutecia's mothers were once under Zest's command, but died when he went against orders and attacked Scaglietti's hideout. Zest asks Regius who was responsible, but Due kills him before he can answer, and Zest kills Due. Erio and Caro manage to overcome Lutecia and Garyū. Fate's resolve is initially undermined by Scaglietti's claim that she is using Erio and Caro for her own fulfillment, but she is encouraged by hearing from the two of them, and defeats him, Tre and Sette.
51	25	"Final Limit"; Transliteration: "Fainaru Rimitto" (Japanese: ファイナル·リミット)	September 16, 2007
The Final Limiter of the dangerous Blaster Mode of Raising Heart is released, and Nanoha shoots through the Saint Cradle, defeating Quattro. Vivio temporarily regains control of herself, and Nanoha manages to defeat her and cause her to regain her senses. While the Cradle has lost its operator and had its main power source destroyed, it still continues to rise with Nanoha, Vivio, Hayate and Rein inside, prompting the people on the ground to rescue them.
52	26	"Toward The Promised Skies"; Transliteration: "Yakusoku no Sora e" (Japanese: 約束の空へ)	September 23, 2007
Subaru and Tea help evacuate Nanoha and the others from the Cradle, and the fleet, under Chrono's command, destroys the ship. Scaglietti and some of the older Numbers are incarcerated, while the rest are sent to a rehabilitation facility along with Lutecia and Agito. Nanoha officially adopts Vivio as her daughter. Section 6, having its original purpose completed, disbands, and everyone separates. Fate returns to her duties as an enforcer with Shari and Teana as her aides, Erio and Caro continue with their partnership and return to the Outlands Environmental Squad. Griffith and Lucino return to the Interstellar Navigation Branch of the main office while Vice returns to being a sniper and Alto becomes an army helicopter pilot. Hayate returns to lead special investigations along with the Wolkenritter and their newest family member Agito. Vivio enrolls in the St. Hilde School of magic while Ginga leads a special rehabilitation program for the numbers. Lutecia moves to an uninhabited planet for care along with her summon beasts and mother. Subaru joins the Disaster Prevention Squad and works to save lives in the harshest conditions and as for Nanoha, she rejected all the promotions given to her for the sake of her current job as an Aerial Tactics Combat Instructor in HQ.

== Magical Girl Lyrical Nanoha ViVid series ==
=== Magical Girl Lyrical Nanoha ViVid (2015) ===
No. overall	No. in season	Title	Original release date
53	1	"Sacred Heart"; Transliteration: "Seikuriddo Hāto" (Japanese: セイクリッド・ハート)	April 3, 2015
On the magical world of Midchilda, Vivio Takamachi is a 10-year-old girl who lives with her adoptive parents, Nanoha Takamachi and Fate T. Harlown, and goes to school with her friends Corona Timil and Rio Wesley. To celebrate Vivio entering her fourth year of elementary school, Nanoha decides to give her her own rabbit-shaped Intelligent Device, which she decides to name "Sacred Heart" or "Chris" for short. Using her new device, Vivio transforms into her mage form, taking the adult Sankt Kaiser form she previously used during an incident several years ago, which comes as a surprise to Fate. As Vivio does some late night training with Nanoha, her Strike Arts instructor, Nove Nakajima, hears about a girl going under the name of the Sankt Kaiser Heidi E. S. Ingvalt who has been attacking various people. The next day, after Nove accompanies Vivio to visit her comatose friend, Ixpellia, she is challenged by the self-proclaimed Ingvalt.
54	2	"Einhart Stratos"; Transliteration: "Ainharuto Sutoratosu" (Japanese: アインハルト・ストラトス)	April 10, 2015
After questioning her about Vivio and Ixpellia, Ingvalt battles against Nove, determined to prove her own strength. Despite winning the match, Ingvalt, who, like Vivio, is a child using an adult form to battle, passes out from exhaustion. Recovered by Nove's sister Subaru and her partner Teana Lanster, Ingvalt, who is revealed to be a middle school student named Einhart Stratos, is examined by doctors, who reveal she possesses memories of the Sankt Kaiser Claus G.S. Ingvalt and has inherited his Belkan fighting style. As Nove learns more about Einhart and her ancestor's past, Vivio and her friends brush on the history of Sankt Kaiser in preparation for a meeting with Einhart.
55	3	"True Feelings"; Transliteration: "Honki no Kimochi" (Japanese: 本気の気持ち)	April 17, 2015
Nove invites Einhart to join Vivio in her Strike Arts training, having them participate in hand-to-hand sparring. Managing to take on Vivio's attacks and beat her with a single strike, Einhart feels disappointed that Vivio wasn't being serious, so Nove arranges a proper match for them the following week. As Vivio becomes downhearted that she couldn't live up to Einhart's expectations, she decides to train hard over the next week in order to become stronger. On the day of the match, Vivio brings out her full strength against Einhart, but once again loses to Einhart's amazing strength, though not before leaving a delayed counterattack. Despite still feeling she isn't the girl her ancestor wanted to meet, Einhart finds herself drawn to Vivio and decides to become friends with her.
56	4	"Brand New Heart"; Transliteration: "Buran Nyū Hāto" (Japanese: ブランニュー・ハート)	April 24, 2015
Following school exams, Einhart is invited to join Vivio and the others to a special camping trip to Lutecia Alpine's residence in Carnaaji. The girls start off the trip with a swim in the river, where Einhart learns how to control her strength whilst in water. Afterwards, they have lunch, where Vivio tells Einhart about how Nove became her instructor.
57	5	"Surprise Attack"; Transliteration: "Sapuraizu Atakku" (Japanese: サプライズ・アタック)	May 1, 2015
Einhart shares with Vivio about the memories passed down to her by Klaus, including all the happy memories spent with Vivio's ancestor, Sankt Kaiser Olivie Segbrecht, whose death drove Klaus to try and obtain true strength. Later, the girls get to watch Nanoha, Fate, and the other top mages in intense mock battles, which encourages Vivio and Einhart to resume training, while Corona receives her own intelligent device from Lutecia. Afterwards, everyone gets to enjoy the residence's hot springs, where Sein, one of Nove's sisters, attempts to get up to mischief but is stopped in her tracks when Rio's adult mage form activates in self-defense. Once the matter is settle with, Einhart becomes excited about a joint mock battle with the top mages taking place the next day.
58	6	"Matchup Duel"; Transliteration: "Matchiappu Dyueru" (Japanese: マッチアップ・デュエル)	May 8, 2015
The mock battle splits the mages into two teams; the Blue Team, featuring Vivio, Nanoha, Subaru, Rio, Lutecia, and Erio Mondial, and the Red Team, consisting of Fate, Einhart, Corona, Teana, Nove, and Caro Ru Lushe. As everyone focuses on their chosen opponent, Corona uses her new device to summon a Golem to fight against Rio, though still struggles against her fighting style. Believing the Blue Team's strategy revolves around Nanoha, Teana sends in Einhart who, despite managing to break out of her bind with a move she learned from Nove, is ultimately overwhelmed by Nanoha's power. The Blue Team soon carry out their plan, facing against the Red team's members two-on-one, while Teana prepares a counterattack.
59	7	"New Stage!"; Transliteration: "Nyū Sutēji!" (Japanese: ニュー・ステージ!)	May 15, 2015
With two fighters eliminated on each side, Nanoha and Teana launch Starlight Breakers at each other, the aftermath leaving just Vivio and Einhart remaining in the game, ultimately ending in a double knockout. After a few more mock battles featuring different matchups, Lutecia tells Einhart about the Inter-Middle Championship, a tournament for young mages which everyone is interested in entering. Wanting to fight more with Vivio, Einhart decides to enter the tournament as well. With Einhart needing a device in order to qualify, Lutecia gets into contact with Hayate Yagami, who offers to make a device that suits her fighting style. In the meantime, Nove begins training Vivio and the others for the tournament, with many strong fighters looking to enter.
60	8	"Rival!"; Transliteration: "Raibaru!" (Japanese: ライバル!)	May 22, 2015
Vivio has a sparring match against one of the other tournament combatants, Chantez Apinion, using Chris' Contact Mode to block each of her attacks but becoming caught off guard by Chantez's special technique. Meanwhile, Hayate and her team finish completion on Einhart's new device, which she decides to call Asteon or Teo for short. Afterwards, each of the girls begin their individual training for the tournament, with Vivio studying under Nove, while Chris approaches Nanoha on how better to protect Vivio. As the day of the tournament qualifiers soon arrive, Vivio is introduced to Vita and Zafira's understudy, Miura Rinaldi, with both of them clearing their qualification rounds.
61	9	"Intermiddle Championship"; Transliteration: "Intāmidoru Chanpionshippu" (Japanese: インターミドル・チャンピオンシップ)	May 29, 2015
The star players soon have their qualifying matches, with Els Tasmin facing off against former champion Harry Tribeca. Els hits Harry with her chains, but Harry manages to break her arm free and deal heavy damage in return. Els attempts a counterattack, but Harry uses her own chains against her to win the match. After all of Team Nakajima make it through the qualifying rounds, Miura faces off against Mikaya Chevelle, the one who trained Einhart for the tournament. Despite taking a lot of damage from Mikaya's sword attacks, Miura brings out the full might of her Star Saber device to defeat Mikaya with a powerful kick.
62	10	"For Victory!"; Transliteration: "Shōri no Tame ni!" (Japanese: 勝利のために！)	June 5, 2015
With the third round approaching, Vivio is scheduled to fight against Miura while Einhart and Corona must face against each other. Before that, Chantez faces off against Victoria Dahlgrun, managing to land some attacks with her clone magic. However, Victoria remains resistant and overcomes Chantez's clones, winning the match. Meanwhile, Corona prepares to face off against Einhart, preparing a risky technique that Nove suggests she only use as a last resort. As the match begins, Corona uses a technique against Einhart in order to create an opportunity to make her golem.
63	11	"Hegemon's Fist, Creator's Desire"; Transliteration: "Haō no Ken, Sō-nushi no Negai" (Japanese: 覇王の拳・創主の願い)	June 12, 2015
After a fierce battle, Einhart defeats Corona.
64	12	"Meaning of Ending a Match"; Transliteration: "Ketchaku no Imi" (Japanese: 決着の意味)	June 19, 2015
Einhart feels bad after defeating Corona and her previous opponents, but Nove teaches her the meaning of winning and losing in a competition. Elsewhere, Vivio and friends prepare for their own upcoming matches.

=== ViVid Strike! (2016) ===
No. overall	No. in season	Title	Original release date
65	1	"Fuuka Reventon"; Transliteration: "Fūka Reventon" (Japanese: フーカ・レヴェントン)	October 1, 2016
After receiving some injuries following a fight with some punks, orphan Fuuka Reventon is helped out by Einhart, who invites her to come to the Nakajima Gym afterwards. Noticing Fuuka's potential as a martial artist, Einhart offers her a part-time job at the gym. Despite having a hatred of martial arts after losing to her former friend, Rinne Berlinetta, Fuuka accepts the job and starts off as a sparring partner for Vivio and her friends, becoming surprised by how strong they are. Hearing that Vivio is the one who broke Rinne's winning streak, Fuuka faces her in another sparring match, deciding to stop running away and aim to become stronger.
66	2	"Nakajima Gym"; Transliteration: "Nakajima Jimu" (Japanese: ナカジマジム)	October 8, 2016
Fuuka gets used to working at the Nakajima Gym while also receiving martial arts training from Einhart and her friends. The girls soon begin training using Power Mode, which lets them transform into adults, discovering that Fuuka possesses a high level of magic. After receiving invites to watch Rinne's semi-final match, Nove shows Fuuka footage of Rinne's previous battles, with Fuuka revealing her feud with Rinne spawned from her insulting the ability of one of her opponents.
67	3	"Challenge"; Transliteration: "Chōsen" (Japanese: 挑戦)	October 15, 2016
The girls gather at the arena to watch Rinne's semi-final match against Carrie Tercel, which ends as soon as it begins due to Rinne's unrelenting battle style. Following her match, as Rinne states her determination to beat Einhart, Vivio, and Miura in what she claims will be her last Under 15 tournament, she becomes surprised when Fuuka announces her intention to join the tournament too. Afterwards, Fuuka and Vivio question Rinne over why she is pushing herself to perform martial arts, to which she responds violently, stating her determination to prove her strength at the tournament.
68	4	"Rinne Berlinetta"; Transliteration: "Rinne Berurinetta" (Japanese: リンネ・ベルリネッタ)	October 22, 2016
Einhart's friend Yumina Englave informs Fuuka about the circumstances that led to Rinne's current demeanor. Four years ago, Rinne was adopted into the Berlinetta family, receiving the device Scuderia made by her adoptive grandfather. However, as Rinne became popular in her new school due to her athletic potential, she became the target of bullying. Then one day, the bullies became more violent towards Rinne, crushing her device, beat her up, and preventing her from answering an emergency call as her grandfather ended up passing away. Blaming herself for her grandfather's death, Rinne took brutal revenge on her bullies, becoming determined to become stronger.
69	5	"Huracan"; Transliteration: "Urakan" (Japanese: ウラカン)	October 29, 2016
Following the incident, which was settled outside of court, Rinne ran away from home but was kidnapped by thugs, led by the brother of one of the bullies she had beaten up. The brother and his gang take Rinne to an arcade where he viciously beats her up and calls her out for all the harm his sister has gone through, then later reveals the bullies have lied over tormenting Rinne while accusing her of being the bully. Just then, Rinne is rescued by a woman named Jill Stolas, who became her martial arts coach, helping her to become stronger. Having heard everything from Yumina, Fuuka, satisfied that Rinne's circumstances are her own but still wanting to find a way to help her, decides that she wants to beat her and set her straight. A few days later, Fuuka finally receives her device, Huracan, and begins more advanced sparring against various fighters with tournament experience.
70	6	"Winter Cup"; Transliteration: "Wintā Kappu" (Japanese: ウィンターカップ)	November 5, 2016
After Fuuka manages to place first in her qualifiers, the tournament placements are announced, in which Miura is scheduled to fight against Rinne during the first round. On the night before the tournament, Miura spends the night at Fuuka's place, stating her desire to once again fight Vivio before she graduates from the Under 15 category. As the tournament begins, both Vivio and Fuuka win their first round matches with swift knockouts. During the next match, Miura gets an early advantage against Rinne, knocking her down twice with an array of strikes and counter blows. However, as Miura brings out her Sword Draw technique in the hopes of getting a knockout blow, Vivio realises that following her defeat in the Summer Cup, Rinne has been strengthening her defense. Managing to withstand Miura's attacks, Rinne delivers a powerful blow that shatters Miura's ribs, forcing Nove to throw in the towel.
71	7	"Vivio Takamachi"; Transliteration: "Takamachi Vivio" (Japanese: 高町ヴィヴィオ)	November 12, 2016
After Einhart quickly wins her first round match, the girls check up on Miura, who is secretly upset about her failure. As Vivio decides to spend the night training, she and the others recall how she and Nove first started training and everything that had happened since. On the next day of the tournament, Vivio faces off against Rinne, delivering several quick jabs. Rinne soon starts delivering a powerful counterattack, but Vivio manages to break free, stating her determination to win and perhaps become friends with her.
72	8	"Victor and Loser"; Transliteration: "Shōsha to Haisha" (Japanese: 勝者と敗者)	November 19, 2016
Vivio continues to take control of the match through the second round, with Rinne struggling to keep up with her pace. In the third round, however, Rinne takes a direct hit to the face so she can deliver a brutal counter, dealing heavy damage to Vivio. Despite the damage taken, Vivio manages to stand up again to resume the fight. Changing up her stance, Vivio defeats Rinne with a knockout barrage, albeit sustaining enough damage that she herself will need to drop out of the finals. As both Rinne and Jill are distraught over their loss, Fuuka prepares for her next match.
73	9	"Reunion"; Transliteration: "Saikai" (Japanese: 再会)	November 26, 2016
Both Fuuka and Einhart manage to win their matches and reach the finals, where they are scheduled to fight against each other. Meanwhile, Rinne has been holed up inside her room following her defeat against Vivio. As Nove encounters Jill at the hospital, they hear from Victoria that Rinne plans to quit martial arts. Hearing Fuuka's resolve to still fight Rinne, Einhart offers Rinne the opportunity to have a title match against her if she can defeat Fuuka. Accepting Einhart's proposal, Rinne arrives at Lutecia's training ground for a no-holds-barred match against Fuuka.
74	10	"Rain"; Transliteration: "Ame" (Japanese: 雨)	December 3, 2016
With the two girls constantly exchanging blows, Fuuka gains the upper hand by using techniques she had learned from sparring with her friends. Despite Jill wanting to throw in the towel, Rinne remains determined to fight back. While Rinne remains focused on her obsession with gaining strength, Fuuka attempts to reason with her, recalling when the two of them spent time together at the orphanage. Feeling that her biggest enemy is herself, Rinne states that if she wins, Fuuka must stop meddling in her affairs.
75	11	"The Strike"; Transliteration: "Uchinuku Sutoraiku" (Japanese: 打ち抜く一撃)	December 10, 2016
As the match continues, Jill recalls when she first started training Rinne, regretting not being able to save her from her self-inflicted torture. Despite being overwhelmed by Fuuka's strength and her own wavering heart, Rinne recalls all of her intense training with Jill and counters with a incredibly powerful uppercut that surpasses the field's safety setting. With both fighters no longer holding any bitterness towards each others, the girls decide to settle things with an all-offensive fist fight. As Rinne finally comes to accept that she is allowed to be happy, Fuuka wins the match by knockout, happy that the light has returned to Rinne's eyes.
76	12	"Within the Peace"; Transliteration: "Tsunaida Te no Naka ni" (Japanese: 繋いだ手の中に)	December 17, 2016
Following the match, Rinne talks with Jill, stating that she intends to continue competing while training under her. Later, Fuuka and Rinne spend some time together, receiving messages from those who watched their match and rekindling their friendship. Afterwards, as Fuuka and Einhart both prepare for their match together, Jill apologises to Nove, coming to understand more about the way she trains her students. On the day of the Winter Cup final, Rinne and Jill come to support Fuuka as she goes up against Einhart.
