= Kana Ueda =

Japanese voice actress and singer (born 1980)

- 植田 佳奈
- Born: June 9, 1980 (age 46); Ikoma, Nara, Japan
- Occupations: Voice actress; singer
- Years active: 2001–present
- Agent: I'm Enterprise

Kana Ueda (植田 佳奈, Ueda Kana; born June 9, 1980) is a Japanese voice actress and singer.

== Biography ==
=== Youth and training ===
She is a graduate of Kobe College's department of General Culture.

=== Career ===
She is best known as the voices of Yumi Fukuzawa in Maria-sama ga Miteru, Rin Tōsaka in the Fate franchise, Hayate Yagami in Magical Girl Lyrical Nanoha A's and Magical Girl Lyrical Nanoha Strikers, and Rachel Alucard in BlazBlue. Ueda was raised in Osaka Prefecture and is known for her strong Kansai accent in some of her roles. She is represented by I'm Enterprise.

== Filmography ==
=== Television animation ===
year	work (character)
2001	Angelic Layer (Ringo Seto); Chance Pop Session (Jun Morimura); Cyborg 009 (Cyborg 001/Ivan Wisky); Final Fantasy: Unlimited (Herba); Great Dangaioh (Ryoko Sugi)
2002	Samurai Deeper Kyo (Antera, Saisei)
2003	Green Green (Reika Morimura); Mermaid Melody Pichi Pichi Pitch (Sara); Tsukihime (Kohaku); Wandaba Style (Yuri Fuyude)
2004	Burst Angel (Yoko); Daphne in the Brilliant Blue (Shizuka Hayama); Doki Doki School Hours (Minako Tominaga); Gakuen Alice (Mikan Sakura, Amanatsu); Kannazuki no Miko (Korona, Orochi); Kujibiki Unbalance (Lisa Humvee); Maria-sama ga Miteru (Yumi Fukuzawa); Maria-sama ga Miteru: Printemps (Yumi Fukuzawa); Melody of Oblivion (Kyu-chan); Mermaid Melody Pichi Pichi Pitch Pure (Sara); Ragnarok the Animation (Lisa); Tactics (Edogawa Miyako); The Marshmallow Times (Jasmine, Pansy); Uta Kata (Minami)
2005	Best Student Council (Kotoha Kutsugi, Fake Maachi); He Is My Master (Anna Kurauchi); Hell Girl (Mayumi Hashimoto); Loveless (Yuiko Hawatari); Magical Girl Lyrical Nanoha A's (Hayate Yagami); Rockman.EXE Stream (Pink Bunny); Pani Poni Dash! (Kurumi Momose); Petopeto-san (Petoko (Hatoko Fujimura))
2006	Ballad of a Shinigami (Yutaka Fujishima); Chocotto Sister (Hideko Hasuki); Fate/stay night (Rin Tōsaka); Gin Tama (Hanako); Glass Fleet (Aimel); Majime ni Fumajime Kaiketsu Zorori (Cinderella); Kashimashi: Girl Meets Girl (Hazumu Osaragi); Ryusei no Rockman (Luna Shirogane); Pokémon: Battle Frontier (Luna); Pumpkin Scissors (Sergeant Stekkin, Claymore One Member/Fransisca); Tactical Roar (Sango Fukami); Tokko (Suzuka Kureha)
2007	Fantastic Detective Labyrinth (Hatsumi Mieno, Sōka); Gurren Lagann (Kinon Bachika); Hayate the Combat Butler (Sakuya Aizawa); Hitohira (Haruko Tamashiro); Kaze no Stigma (Misao Ōgami); Kotetsushin Jeeg (Tsubaki Tamashiro); Magical Girl Lyrical Nanoha StrikerS (Hayate Yagami); Majin Tantei Nōgami Neuro (Yako Katsuragi); Major (Third Season) (Miho Nakamura); Ryusei no Rockman Tribe (Luna Shirogane); Night Wizard The ANIMATION (Azel Iblis); Pururun! Shizuku-Chan (Ichigo); Rental Magica (Honami Takase Ambler, White Tiger); Strawberry 100% (Kozue Mukai); Sugarbunnies (Sophia Cherbourg, Buchiusa); The Galaxy Railways (Frel); Tokyo Majin Gakuen Kenpuchō: Tō (Marie Claire); Tokyo Majin Gakuen Kenpuchō: Tō Dai Ni Maku (Second Act) (Marie Claire); Zombie-Loan (Koyomi Yoimachi, Yomi)
2008	Kure-nai (Lin Cheng-Shin); Linebarrels of Iron (Shizuna Endo); Nogizaka Haruka no Himitsu (Nanami Nanashiro); Sekirei (Yomi); Shigofumi: Letters from the Departed (Fumika); Sugarbunnies: Chocolat! (Sophia Cherbourg, Buchiusa); Telepathy Shōjo Ran (Midori Naha); Toshokan Sensō (Marie Nakazawa); Tytania (Laetitia)
2009	Atashin'chi (Ōnishi); A Certain Scientific Railgun (Mii Konori); Hayate the Combat Butler (Sakuya Aizawa); Kämpfer (Rika Ueda); Maria-sama ga Miteru 4th Season (Yumi Fukuzawa); Nogizaka Haruka no Himitsu: Pure Rezza (Nanami Nanashiro, Nanao); Saki (Saki Miyanaga); Sugarbunnies: Fleur (Sophia Cherbourg, Buchiusa, Narration); Taishō Baseball Girls (Noe Kawashima); Tears to Tiara (Rathty); Viper's Creed (Chris)
2010	Gokujō!! Mecha Mote Iinchō – Second Collection (Riko Kaneda); Kaichō wa Maid-sama! (Subaru); Sound of the Sky (Yukiko); Tegami Bachi Reverse (Celica); Uragiri wa Boku no Namae o Shitteiru (Ashley)
2011	Bunny Drop (Haruko Maeda); Fate/Zero (Rin Tōsaka); Freezing (Attia Simmons); Heaven's Memo Pad (Kayo Fujishima); Kaitō Tenshi Twin Angel (Yuriko Barakoji); Kämpfer fur die Liebe (Rika Ueda); Yumekui Merry (Chizuru Kawanami)
2012	Accel World (Akira Himi/Aqua Current); Aesthetica of a Rogue Hero (Chikage Izumi); AKB0048 (Tomoyo Itano/Tomomi Itano The 11th); Cardfight!! Vanguard: Asia Circuit (Jillian Chen); Fate/Zero 2nd Season (Rin Tōsaka); Girls und Panzer (Momo Kawashima); Hayate no Gotoku! (Sakuya Aizawa); Hunter × Hunter (Neon Nostrade); Muv-Luv: Total Eclipse (Kazusa Yamashiro); Pocket Monsters: Best Wishes! (Skyla); Saki Achiga-hen Episode of Side-A (Saki Miyanaga); Sengoku Collection (Ageha); Thermae Romae (Yamaguchi)
2013	AKB0048 Next Stage (Tomoyo Itano/Tomomi Itano The 11th); A Certain Scientific Railgun S (Mii Konori); BLAZBLUE Alter Memory (Rachel Alucard); Cardfight!! Vanguard: Link Joker (Jillian Chen); Detective Conan (Hikaru Hinohara); Fate/kaleid liner Prisma Illya (Rin Tōsaka); Hayate the Combat Butler: Cuties (Sakuya Aizawa); Hyperdimension Neptunia (IF); Pokémon Smash! (Luna); Stella Women's Academy, High School Division Class C³ (Aoi Seto); Strike the Blood (Koyomi Shizuka/Paper Noise); Tanken Driland: Sennen no Mahō (Sara); Yuyushiki (Aikawa's Mother)
2014	Atelier Escha & Logy: Alchemists of the Dusk Sky (Marion); Cardfight!! Vanguard: Legion Mate (Jillian Chen); D-Frag! (Tama Sakai); Saki Zenkoku-hen (Saki Miyanaga); Fate/Kaleid liner Prisma Illya 2wei! (Rin Tōsaka); Fate stay night: Unlimited Blade Works (Rin Tōsaka)
2015	Aoharu x Machinegun (Hanako Sagara); Assassination Classroom (Yuzuki Fuwa); Bikini Warriors (Paladin); Fate/Kaleid liner Prisma Illya 2wei! Herz! (Rin Tōsaka); Fate/stay night: Unlimited Blade Works 2nd Season (Rin Tōsaka); Gangsta. (Loretta Cristiano Amodio); Gunslinger Stratos (Sidune Rindo); Magical Girl Lyrical Nanoha ViVid (Hayate Yagami); One Piece (Lammy)
2016	Assassination Classroom 2nd Season (Yuzuki Fuwa); D.Gray-man Hallow (Klaud Nine); Haven't You Heard? I'm Sakamoto (Mī-chan); Luck & Logic (Pieri Saotome); Fate/kaleid liner Prisma Illya 3rei!! (Rin Tōsaka); Handa-kun (Tsugumi); Re:Zero -Starting Life in Another World- (Anastasia Hoshin)
2017	Idol Memories (Maybell Takasaki); Hina Logi ~from Luck & Logic~ (Yūko Morigaya)
2018	Citrus (Ume Aihara); Fate/Extra Last Encore (Rin Tōsaka); Hi Score Girl (Ms. Tono)
2019	Fate/Grand Order – Absolute Demonic Front: Babylonia (Ishtar, Ereshkigal); Fate/kaleid liner Prisma Illya: Prisma Phantasm (Rin Tohsaka); Demon Slayer: Kimetsu no Yaiba (Mukago); Magical Girl Spec-Ops Asuka (Estrella Claudia); Phantasy Star Online 2: Episode Oracle (Sarah)
2020	A Certain Scientific Railgun T (Mii Konori); Black Clover (Undine); Fate/Grand Carnival (Ishtar, Ereshkigal); Moriarty the Patriot (Miss Hudson); Super HxEros (Kaikochu)
2021	Dr. Ramune: Mysterious Disease Specialist (Ayame); Battle Athletes Victory ReSTART! (Tamami Yanagida); 86 (Grethe Wenzel); Lupin the 3rd: Part VI (Ruriko Shigetomi)
2022	Princess Connect! Re:Dive Season 2 (Kurumi); Mahoutsukai Reimeiki (Faeria)
2023	My Happy Marriage (Kanoko Saimori)
2024	Re:Monster (Gobe); Shibuya Hachi (Nana); Re:Zero -Starting Life in Another World- (Anastasia Hoshin); Wonderful Pretty Cure! (Niko)
2026	My Hero Academia: Vigilantes 2nd Season (Monika Kaniyashiki); Magical Girl Lyrical Nanoha Exceeds Gun Blaze Vengeance (Hayate Yagami)

=== Anime films ===
- Girls und Panzer das Finale: Part III (Momo Kawashima) (2021)

=== Original video animation (OVA) ===
year	work (character)
2004	Daphne in the Brilliant Blue (Shizuka Hayama); Doki Doki School Hours (Minako Tominaga)
2009	Aki Sora (Nami Aoi); Denpa teki na Kanojo (Kaori Shiraishi); Hayate the Combat Butler (Sakuya Aizawa)
2010	A Certain Scientific Railgun (Mii Konori)
2021	Hori-san to Miyamura-kun (Yuki Yoshikawa); Dr. Ramune: Mysterious Disease Specialist (Ayame)
Unsorted	Fate/kaleid liner Prisma Illya series (Rin Tōsaka); Final Fantasy: Unlimited PhaSE.0 (Herba); Girls und Panzer series (Momo Kawashima); He Is My Master Emergency Dispatch (Anna Kurauchi); Kujibiki Unbalance (Lisa Humvee); Kure-nai (Lin Cheng-Shin); Kyō no Go no Ni (Megumi Hidaka); Maria-sama ga Miteru (Yumi Fukuzawa); Master of Martial Hearts (Ryu Getsurei); Nogizaka Haruka no Himitsu Finale (Nanami Nanashiro); Pani Poni Dash! (Kurumi Momose); Saki Biyori (Saki Miyanaga); Shigofumi: Letters from the Departed (Fumika); Strawberry 100% (Kozue Mukai); Strike Witches: Operation Victory Arrow (Heidemarie W. Schnaufer); Sylvanian Families (Shima Neko); Wandaba Style (Yuri Fuyude)

=== Theatrical animation ===
year	work (character)
2008	Gurren Lagann the Movie: Childhood's End (Kinon Bachika)
2009	Gurren Lagann the Movie: The Lights in the Sky are Stars (Kinon Bachika)
2010	Fate/stay night: Unlimited Blade Works (Rin Tōsaka)
2011	Hayate the Combat Butler! Heaven Is a Place on Earth (Sakuya Aizawa)
2012	Magical Girl Lyrical Nanoha The Movie 2nd A's (Hayate Yagami); Strike Witches: The Movie (Heidemarie W. Schnaufer)
2013	Hunter × Hunter: The Last Mission (Neon Nostrade)
2015	Girls und Panzer der Film (Momo Kawashima)
2017	Fate/stay night: Heaven's Feel I. presage flower (Rin Tōsaka); Girls und Panzer das Finale: Part 1 (Momo Kawashima); Magical Girl Lyrical Nanoha Reflection (Hayate Yagami, Dearche)
2018	Magical Girl Lyrical Nanoha Detonation (Hayate Yagami, Dearche)
2019	Fate/stay night: Heaven's Feel II. lost butterfly (Rin Tōsaka); Girls und Panzer das Finale: Part 2 (Momo Kawashima)
2020	Fate/stay night: Heaven's Feel III. spring song (Rin Tōsaka)
2021	Girls und Panzer das Finale: Part 3 (Momo Kawashima)
2023	Girls und Panzer das Finale: Part 4 (Momo Kawashima)

=== Web anime ===
- 7SEEDS (Mayu)
- Koro-sensei Q! (Yuzuki Fuwa, Yako Katsuragi)
- Maria-sama no Oshirase (Yumi Fukuzawa)
- Sailor Moon Crystal (Princess Dia)

=== Drama CD ===
year	work (character)
2006	Pani Poni Dash! (Kurumi Momose) – Drama CD 1 and 2
2008	Hayate the Combat Butler (Sakuya Aizawa) – Drama CD 3; Nogizaka Haruka no Himitsu (Nanami Nanashiro) – Drama CD 1 and 2
Unsorted	Needless (Setsuna); Tonari no 801-chan (801-chan); Vampire Knight (Sayori Wakaba); Working!! (Aoi Yamada)

=== Vomic ===
- Beelzebub (Hildegarde)

=== Video games ===
year	work (character)
2002	Ever 17: The Out of Infinity (Sara Matsunaga)
2004	Fate series (Rin Tōsaka); Summon Night: Swordcraft Story 2 (Area)
2006	Disgaea 2: Cursed Memories (Yukimaru, Asagi)
2007	ASH: Archaic Sealed Heat (Maritie); Record of Agarest War (Ellis); Summon Night: Twin Age (Reiha)
2008	BlazBlue series (Rachel Alucard) (2008-present); Star Ocean: First Departure (Erys Jerand)
2009	Tales of Graces (Pascal)
2010	Hyperdimension Neptunia series (IF) (2010–present); Magical Girl Lyrical Nanoha A's Portable: The Battle of Aces (Hayate Yagami, Dearche)
2011	Aquapazza: Aquaplus Dream Match (Rathy); Magical Girl Lyrical Nanoha A's Portable: The Gears of Destiny (Hayate Yagami, Dearche); Queen's Gate: Spiral Chaos (Alice)
2012	Gunslinger Stratos series (Sidune Rindo) (2012–present)
2013	Master of Martial Hearts (Ryu Getsurei); Summon Night 5 (Cyda)
2014	GIRLS und PANZER: Sensha-dou, Kiwamemasu! (Momo Kawashima); Granblue Fantasy (Yuel)
2015	Fate/Grand Order (Ishtar, Ereshkigal, "Space Ishtar")
2016	Girls' Frontline (Howa Type 64, X95); Shadowverse (Yuel the Ancient, Flower Princess, Beauty and the Beast, Kunoichi Master, Shadow Witch, Ceres of the Night, Labyrinth Devil); Street Fighter V (Ibuki) (Note: Shared role with Ayumi Fujimura.); Valkyrie Connect (Valkyrie Urd, Mecha-Fist Sif and Others)
2017	Accel World vs. Sword Art Online: Millennium Twilight (Akira Himi/Aqua Current)
2018	Dragalia Lost (Ezelith, Althemia); GIRLS und PANZER: Dream Tank Match (Momo Kawashima); Grand Chase: Dimensional Chaser (Rasel Coriander); Mahjong Soul (Fu Ji); Princess Connect Re:Dive (Kurumi/Kurumi Kuribayashi); Sdorica (Izumi, Izumi SP, Izumi MZ)
2019	Another Eden: The Cat Beyond Time and Space (Melody); Arknights (Skyfire); Epic Seven (Cermia); Magia Record (Arisa Narumi, Hayate Yagami); Witch Weapon (Beth, Henriette Khunrath)
2020	Genshin Impact (Yoimiya); Guardian Tales (Loraine); Touhou Lost Word (Hatate Himekaidou)
2021	Alchemy Stars (Nadine, Nikinis); Everyday: Today's Menu for Emiya Family (Rin Tohsaka); Naraka: Bladepoint (Matari); Senran Nin Nin Ninja Taisen Neptune: Shoujo-tachi no Kyouen (IF); Re:ZERO -Starting Life in Another World- The Prophecy of the Throne (Anastasia Hoshin); The Legend of Heroes: Trails through Daybreak (Lucrezia Isselee)
2022	Dawn of the Monsters (Sofia Cruces); The Legend of Heroes: Trails Through Daybreak II (Lucrezia Isselee); Two Jong Cell!! (Misuto Hisame); Aether Gazer (Hera); Cho Jigen Game Neptune Sisters vs Sisters (IF)
2023	Atelier Resleriana: Forgotten Alchemy & the Liberator of Polar Night (Marion Quinn); Granblue Fantasy Versus: Rising (Yuel); The Seven Deadly Sins: Grand Cross (Sabunak); Reverse: 1999 (Melania); Tales of the Rays: Recollection (Pascal)
2025	Wuthering Waves (Carlotta)
2026	Zenless Zone Zero (Claret)

=== Dubbing ===
==== Live Action ====
- Gilmore Girls (Christine)
- Monk (Lisa)
- Richie Rich (Darcy)
- The Thundermans (Darcy Wong)

==== Animation ====
- 44 Cats (Milady)
- The Backyardigans (Tasha)
- Star vs. the Forces of Evil (Star Butterfly)

== Discography ==
=== Singles ===
- "Over the Fantasy" (December 5, 2001); opening theme song of Final Fantasy: Unlimited.
- "Kirby★March" (December 16, 2001); opening theme song of Kirby of the Stars.
- "First You Draw a Circle" (December 16, 2001); ending theme song of Kirby of the Stars.
- "Earth's Merry-Go-Round" (September 25, 2003).
- "Netsuretsu Kangei Wonderland" (May 27, 2009); (Saki ending theme, with Rie Kugimiya, Ami Koshimizu, Ryōko Shiraishi and Shizuka Itō).
- "Ding Dong Holy Night♪" (January 30, 2019); Princess Connect Re:Dive character song, with Yū Serizawa.

=== Albums ===
- Kanairo (August 25, 2004)
