= Magical Girl Lyrical Nanoha =

2004 anime franchise

- Cover of Magical Girl Lyrical Nanoha DVD vol 2 featuring Nanoha Takamachi and Fate Testarossa

魔法少女リリカルなのは (Mahō Shōjo Ririkaru Nanoha)
- Genre: Action, magical girl
- Created by: Ivory; Masaki Tsuzuki
- Anime television series
- Directed by: Akiyuki Shinbo
- Produced by: Akio Mishima
- Written by: Masaki Tsuzuki
- Music by: Hiroaki Sano
- Studio: Seven Arcs
- Licensed by: NA: Discotek Media
- Original network: GBS, TV Saitama, MTV, TVO, CTC, TVK
- Original run: October 1, 2004 – December 24, 2004
- Episodes: 13
- Sequels
- Magical Girl Lyrical Nanoha A's (2005); Magical Girl Lyrical Nanoha StrikerS (2007); Magical Girl Lyrical Nanoha ViVid (2015); Magical Girl Lyrical Nanoha Exceeds Gun Blaze Vengeance (2026)
- Manga

Magical Girl Lyrical Nanoha: The Movie 1st − The Comics
- Written by: Masaki Tsuzuki
- Illustrated by: Kōji Hasegawa
- Published by: Gakken
- Magazine: Megami Magazine
- Original run: July 30, 2009 – December 27, 2010
- Volumes: 2
- Anime film

Magical Girl Lyrical Nanoha: The Movie 1st
- Directed by: Atsushi Nakayama (Note: Credited as チーフ演出 (Chief Director / Chief Unit Director)); Keizou Kusakawa
- Produced by: Akio Mishima; Tatsuya Tanaka; Hiroyuki Shimizu
- Written by: Masaki Tsuzuki
- Music by: Hiroaki Sano
- Studio: Seven Arcs
- Released: January 23, 2010
- Runtime: 130 minutes
- Manga

ORIGINAL CHRONICLE Magical Girl Lyrical Nanoha The 1st
- Written by: Masaki Tsuzuki
- Illustrated by: Yukari Higa
- Published by: Kadokawa Comics A
- Magazine: Nyantype
- Original run: November 30, 2013 – May 30, 2016
- Volumes: 7
- Anime film

Magical Girl Lyrical Nanoha Reflection
- Directed by: Takayuki Hamana
- Produced by: Tomohiro Arai
- Written by: Masaki Tsuzuki
- Music by: Misa Chūjō
- Studio: Seven Arcs Pictures
- Licensed by: NA: Discotek Media
- Released: July 22, 2017
- Runtime: 107 minutes
- Anime film

Magical Girl Lyrical Nanoha Detonation
- Directed by: Takayuki Hamana
- Produced by: Tomohiro Arai
- Written by: Masaki Tsuzuki
- Music by: Misa Chūjō
- Studio: Seven Arcs Pictures
- Licensed by: NA: Discotek Media
- Released: October 19, 2018
- Runtime: 111 minutes
- icon

Magical Girl Lyrical Nanoha (魔法少女リリカルなのは, Mahō Shōjo Ririkaru Nanoha) is a Japanese anime television series directed by Akiyuki Shinbo, with screenplay written by Masaki Tsuzuki and produced by Seven Arcs. It forms part of the Magical Girl Lyrical Nanoha series. The Japanese Association of Independent Television Stations broadcast 13 episodes between October and December 2004. The series is a spin-off of the Triangle Heart series and its story follows a girl named Nanoha Takamachi who decides to help a young mage named Yūno to recover a set of 21 artifacts named the "Jewel Seeds".

Masaki Tsuzuki adapted the series into a novel, which Megami Bunko published in August 2005. King Records has adapted several soundtracks and drama CDs from the series. A sequel to the anime series titled Magical Girl Lyrical Nanoha A's produced by Seven Arcs premiered in Japan in October 2005, broadcast on Chiba TV. A film adaptation of the anime series, also by Seven Arcs, was released in theaters on January 23, 2010, accompanied by a manga series which was serialized in Megami Magazine between November 2009 and March 2011.

Geneon Entertainment licensed the anime series for English-language dubbed release in North America at Anime Expo 2007 (June 29 to July 2). Due to Geneon switching distribution labels between September 2007 and July 2008, Funimation distributed the series (in a single DVD compilation-volume boxset) approximately one and a half years after the announcement of the licensing. Many production credits for the English-language dubbed release were missing. The anime is now licensed by Discotek Media.

All DVD volumes peaked at 70 to 22 and below on the Oricon Animation DVD ranking and remained on the chart for at least two weeks.

== Plot ==
The storyline follows Nanoha Takamachi, a nine-year-old Japanese girl attending elementary school, who lives with her parents and her older siblings. Nanoha's regular daily life ends when she rescues an injured ferret who reveals himself as a young shapeshifting mage named Yūno Scrya. An archaeologist from a parallel universe called Midchilda, Yūno came to Earth to collect a set of 21 dangerous ancient artifacts named the "Jewel Seeds" (ジュエルシード, Jueru Shīdo) that he first discovered in his own world. Jewel Seeds give living beings who come into contact with them unnatural powers, often turning them into monsters. Yūno, injured while trying to collect them, must now rely on Nanoha while he convalesces in ferret form. He gives Nanoha an "intelligent device" (magical wand) called "Raising Heart" (レイジングハート, Reijingu Hāto), and she unexpectedly shows strong aptitude for magic. As the two gather the Jewel Seeds, Nanoha learns magic from Yūno while continuing with her ordinary everyday life.

In retrieving her sixth Jewel Seed, Nanoha encounters another magical girl named Fate Testarossa and her familiar named Arf. More than a year before the story began, Fate's mother, Precia Testarossa, went insane when her daughter Alicia died, initiating "Project Fate", an illegal research program of cloning and resurrection, making her a fugitive from the inter-dimensional police known as Time-Space Administration Bureau (TSAB). Precia cloned Alicia to create Fate and implanted her with Alicia's memories; nevertheless, she cannot care for Fate as she did for Alicia and abuses her regularly. Despite this, Fate is extremely loyal to her due to Alicia's happy childhood memories, which she takes as her own. In the series, Precia uses Fate to collect Jewel Seeds to reach Al Hazard, a mythical world where Alicia could be truly brought back to life.

Nanoha and Fate repeatedly face off over each new Jewel Seed they find, and the TSAB soon interferes to prevent the collateral damage caused by their battles. Nanoha eventually manages to overpower Fate and brings her to the TSAB, prompting Precia to abandon her and attempt a dimensional jump to Al Hazard with the power of the few Jewel Seeds that Fate has managed to gather. Gathering her resolve, Fate decides to aid the TSAB and Nanoha in their fight to stop Precia. Although they minimize the destructive side-effects of using the Jewel Seeds, they fail to prevent Precia from finishing the spell, and her final whereabouts remains unknown. Fate and Nanoha decide to become friends, but Fate must first return to Midchilda to prove that she was an unwilling accessory in Precia's crimes.

== Production ==
Nanoha Takamachi first appeared as a minor character in the eroge visual novel Triangle Heart 3 released on December 8, 2000. She first appeared, cast as a magical girl, on the merchandise CD Triangle Heart 3 ~Lyrical Toy Box~ released on June 29, 2001. It was written by Masaki Tsuzuki, the creator of the Magical Girl Lyrical Nanoha franchise. Nanoha's first appearance in animation was in the first episode of the Triangle Heart 3 OVA-adaptation series that released on July 24, 2003.

Seven Arcs produced the anime television series Magical Girl Lyrical Nanoha with direction by Akiyuki Shinbo and screenplay by Masaki Tsuzuki. Broadcast across six stations of the Japanese Association of Independent Television Stations, it premiered on October 1, 2004, and aired weekly for 13 episodes until its conclusion on December 25, 2004. Hiroaki Sano produced the music. The series uses two pieces of theme music; the opening theme is "Innocent Starter" performed by Nana Mizuki, and the ending theme is "Little Wish (Lyrical Step)" performed by Yukari Tamura. The series was released across five Region 2 DVD compilation volumes in Japan between January 26, 2005, and May 25, 2005.

At Anime Expo 2007 (June 29 – July 2), Geneon Entertainment announced its acquisition of the English-language license of Magical Girl Lyrical Nanoha and of its sequel, Magical Girl Lyrical Nanoha A's. However, Geneon cancelled its distribution agreement with ADV Films in September 2007. Funimation acquired rights for distribution of Geneon titles in July 2008, after which, Funimation announced that they would soon began distributing the Magical Girl Lyrical Nanoha series. Funimation began distributing the English release in a single Region 1 DVD compilation volume boxset on December 29, 2008. The release was dubbed by Geneon Entertainment in association with World Production Group. Discotek Media will release the anime on Blu-ray in 2024.

== Adaptations ==
=== CDs ===
King Records released two maxi singles and two albums in Japan:

- the album "Innocent Starter" on October 6, 2004.
- the album "Little Wish (Lyrical Step)" on October 21, 2004.
- Alive & Kicking on December 8, 2004; it contained the insert song "Take a Shot" that featured in twelfth episode of the anime television series.
- the soundtrack album titled Magical Girl Lyrical Nanoha Original Sound Track that contained the background music used throughout the anime television series, on May 11, 2005. It contains forty-one tracks.

=== Drama CDs ===
King Records has released three drama CD adaptations of the series in Japan. The first, Magical Girl Lyrical Nanoha Sound Stage 01, appeared on November 26, 2004, and contained 16 tracks; its story takes place between episodes two and three of the anime television series. Sound Stage 02 followed on January 13, 2005, containing 19 tracks, and its story takes place between episodes five and six of the anime series. King Records released the final CD, Sound Stage 03, on April 6, 2005; it has 16 tracks, and its story takes place after the conclusion of the anime series.

=== Novel ===
Megami Bunko published a 180-page novelized adaptation titled Magical Girl Lyrical Nanoha (魔法少女リリカルなのは, Mahō Shōjo Ririkaru Nanoha) (ISBN 978-4-05-903506-0) on September 30, 2005. Masaki Tsuzuki wrote the text and Kōji Hasegawa did the illustrations. The plot follows the same story as the anime television series.

=== Film ===
An anime film titled Magical Girl Lyrical Nanoha: The Movie 1st and adapted from the anime television series was released in Japan on January 23, 2010. Aniplex displayed a trailer of the film as well as character-design sketches and original drawings at its booth at Tokyo International Anime Fair 2009. Although the film retells the same story as the anime television series, Masaki Tsuzuki emphasized that the movie is not necessarily the "true history" of the story, but a "new parallel history." The film was released on DVD and Blu-ray-Disc November 26, 2010, and includes English subtitles and an audience participation track.

=== Manga ===
A manga illustrated by Kōji Hasegawa based on the movie adaptation, titled Magical Girl Lyrical Nanoha: The Movie 1st − The Comics was serialized in Gakken's Megami Magazine between November 2009 and March 2011 issues. Like other THE COMICS series in the franchise, it expands upon the story, featuring events not seen in the movie. The series is compiled into two tankōbon, the first was released on June 30, 2010, and the second was released on March 31, 2011. A second manga, ORIGINAL CHRONICLE Magical Girl Lyrical Nanoha The 1st, illustrated by Yukari Higa, was serialized in Kadokawa Shoten's Nyantype from 2013 to 2016, and was compiled in seven volumes. It was a more faithful adaptation of the movie, expanded with adaptations of other Nanoha material.

== Reception ==
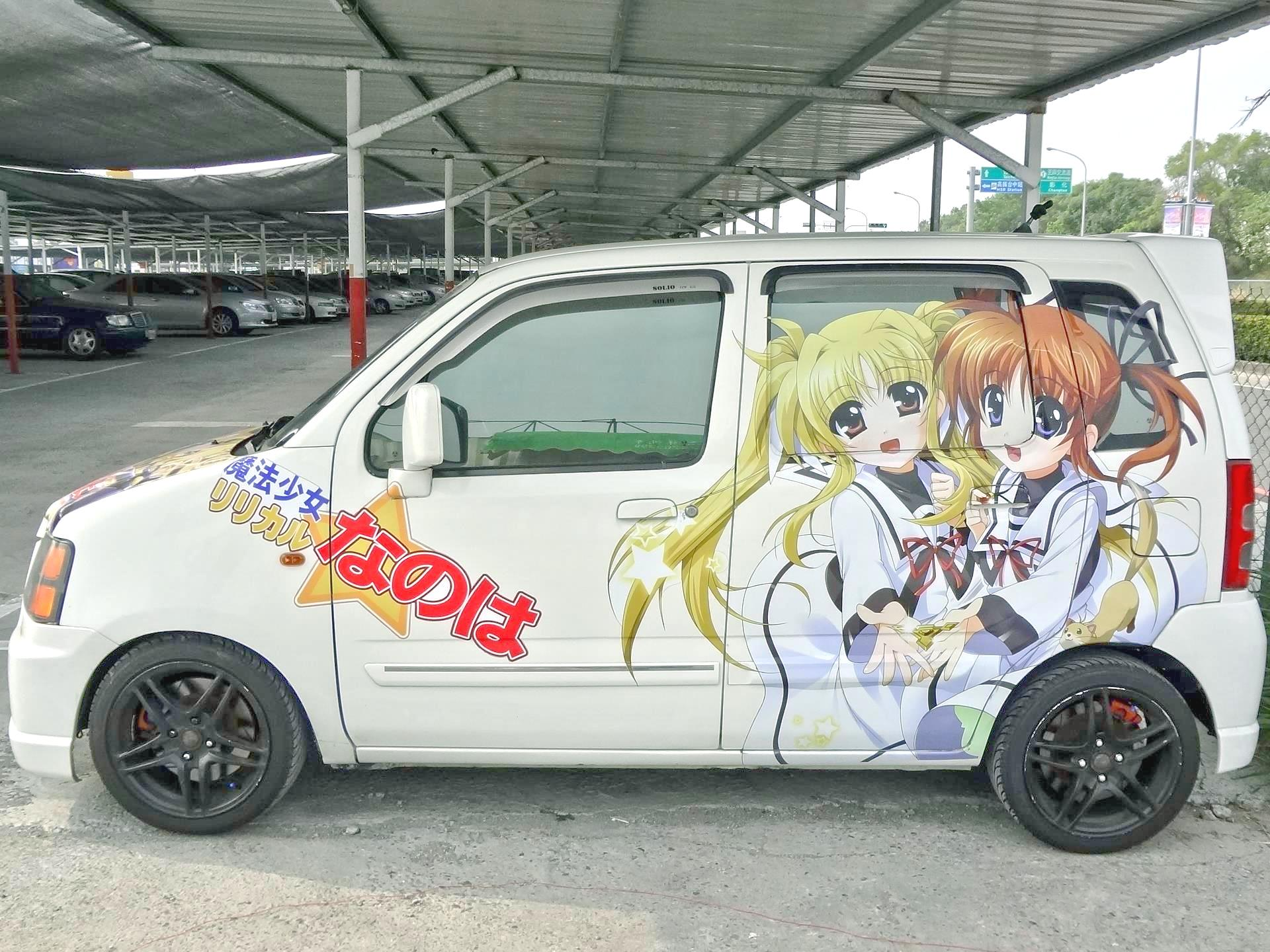
An itasha featuring Fate Testarossa and Nanoha Takamachi

In Japan, the first DVD compilation peaked at 38th on the Oricon DVD chart and remained on the chart for three weeks. The second through fifth DVD volumes each peaked at 39th, 29th, 72nd, and 49th respectively and remained on the chart for two weeks. Before Geneon Entertainment's announcement of its acquisition of the license for the series at Anime Expo 2007, ICv2 reported that the series had gained a reputation among United States "hardcore" fans for its use of technology as a replacement for magic and being a magical girl series that uncharacteristically deals with more "real" and "intense" social problems. Geneon's lack of a distributor between September 2007 and July 2008 left many English-language fans wondering as to what would occur to the distribution status of the series that Geneon had licensed - including Magical Girl Lyrical Nanoha. A fan pointed out that the English-language dubbed DVD boxset did not contain the credits for the director, automated dialogue replacement script adapter, and some voice actors. Many English-language viewers, even the more knowledgeable, reported being largely unfamiliar with many of the names of the voice actors and won the award for Best Supporting Voice Actress in the Seiyu Awards who contributed to the voice actress worked with Yukari Tamura and Nana Mizuki.

Anime News Network's Carl Kimlinger described the anime series as one filled with typical magical-girl tropes and as one that takes otaku-targeted entertainment to "its logical extreme" — filled with what he described as a "neutron-star" of otaku obsessions. Although Tim Jones of THEM Anime Reviews noted that the series did contain aspects typical of the magical girl genre, he stated that the anime had several unique aspects such as featuring characters fighting "physically" instead at long-range with magic and targeting "an older male demographic". Davey C. Jones of Active Anime praised the series for building up to "intense double climax" with the revelation of Fate's backstory and the final battle on Precia's ship. However, Mania Entertainment's Chris Beveridge criticized the anime series as too rushed, stating that it would have been "more engaging and fun" as a 26-episode series as opposed to its 13 episodes. Tim Jones lauded the last five episodes of the series as its highlight due to the dramatic change in style the series underwent introducing "intrigue and excitement" to the show, criticizing the first few episodes as "most forgettable, boring, and just plain uninteresting episodes of any show [he had] ever seen". Both Beveridge and Kimlinger criticized the series for conveying a sense of maturity that is "out of place" in a storyline that follows third-grade characters at the age of nine.

Beveridge described the anime series as having well-designed visuals with character designs produced with "strong, vibrant colors" that "all come across very well". Davey C. Jones praised the visual effects applied to the spells as making them "look extra spiffy and, well, magical". Kimlinger noted the use of multiple animation directors who gave "each episode a distinct look" and allowed the series to "retain a level of stylistic continuity" that he described as resulting in an "uneven, but ... undeniably appealing" look. Although Tim Jones praised the character designs as "distinct enough to distinguish [between] the fairly large cast", he criticized the animation quality as ranging from "okay to downright lazy". He stated that "aside from the great opening song, the music, though good, is forgettable", but described the ending theme as "lame". Beveridge stated that the "solid" musical score helps convey the "action cleanly".

Mania Entertainment's G. B. Smith criticized the English-language dubbed release by Geneon for having several inconsistencies in the performances, pronunciation of names and localization, but accredited these faults to the direction. Smith praised the voice actors in the English dub for many of the main characters, stating that "here are several A rank performances that shine quite well"; however, Smith stated that "there is a noticeable drop off in the quality of the voices and the performances in the lesser and incidental characters." Smith noted that the subtitles and English dub diverged "sharply" in the way they name characters. Additionally, Smith criticized the English script for being excessively lip-synched, producing "weird sounding English".

The film adaptation earned 380 million yen (approx. US$4.4 million) during its release. The Blu-ray Disc version of the movie sold 58,000 copies in its first week and has been in the top position of the Blu-ray charts for its first two weeks of sale.
