= Magical Record Lyrical Nanoha Force =

Japanese manga series

- Cover of Magical Record Lyrical Nanoha Force volume 1

魔法戦記リリカルなのはForce (Mahō Senki Ririkaru Nanoha Force)
- Genre: Magical girl
- Manga
- Written by: Masaki Tsuzuki
- Illustrated by: Yukari Higa
- Published by: Kadokawa Shoten
- Magazine: Nyantype
- Original run: April 30, 2009 – June 29, 2013 (indefinite hiatus)
- Volumes: 6
- Manga

Magical Record Lyrical Nanoha Force Dimension
- Written by: Asuka Kanan
- Published by: Kadokawa Shoten
- Magazine: Nyantype (2010-2011); 4-Koma Nano Ace
- Original run: March 30, 2010 – indefinite hiatus

Magical Record Lyrical Nanoha Force (魔法戦記リリカルなのはForce, Mahō Senki Ririkaru Nanoha Force) or Magical War Chronicle Lyrical Nanoha Force is a Japanese manga series written by Masaki Tsuzuki and illustrated by Yukari Higa. It is part of the fourth Nanoha series along with ViVid, and was serialized in Kadokawa Shoten's Nyantype magazine, first appearing in that magazine's inaugural issue in April 2009, until going into indefinite hiatus in 2013. Six volumes of the series have been released. The story is set six years after the events of Magical Girl Lyrical Nanoha StrikerS, and focuses on the investigation into the "Eclipse Virus," a magical disease that turns those infected with it into superhumans with violent impulses. A four-panel comic based on the series, titled Magical Record Lyrical Nanoha Force Dimension, began serialization in Nyantype on March 30, 2010, before being transferred to Kadokawa's4koma Nano Ace magazine from March 9, 2011.

== Plot ==
The story appears to be centered on the investigation of the Book of the Silver Cross, an ancient Belkan magical tome, and that tome's accompanying Dividers, magical weapons with currently unknown powers. Thoma Avenir, while travelling, discovers a girl named Lily Strosek trapped inside a strange research facility. When Thoma rescues Lily from her confinement, she grants him a new magical device that refers to itself as one of these Dividers. However, unbeknownst to them, a group of people known as the Huckebein family are also using these weapons to cause large amounts of chaos and destruction, leading to an investigation by the Time-Space Administration Bureau. Before long, Thoma and Lily find themselves caught up in the ambitions of the Huckebein family and the investigation of the Bureau.

== Characters ==
Thoma Avenir (トーマ・アヴェニール, Tōma Avenīru)
A freelance archaeologist from the planet Vaizen, who travels various places with his camera Device, Steed. While he is originally an orphan (he didn't know who his family was even before the town's destruction, leaving many to believe that his ancestors were related to the Divider) from a mining town in Vaizen, it was destroyed seven years before the beginning of the manga, and Thoma vowed to take his revenge on the people who destroyed it. Despite that past, he is generally kind and helpful in disposition, as displayed by his desire to help Lily and his willingness to carry her around.
When he meets Lily, he is given a powerful new Device, a revolver with a large blade beneath the barrel known as the EC Divider, code 996. It is a powerful weapon, but the exact details of its use or capabilities are unknown. In addition, as a consequence of using the Divider, Thoma appears to be suffering from a disease known as "Eclipse"; the exact effects and nature of this affliction are also unknown. His abilities with the Divider are apparently rather exceptional as such the Huckebein consider him vital to their plans.
Upon meeting Veyron in a church on Ruwella, he recognized the emblem on Veryon's arm from the destruction of the Vaizen Mines seven years ago. He demanded to know whether it was Veyron who was responsible for the destruction. After a short fight, Veyron left without answering Thoma.
Lily Strosek (リリィ・シュトロゼック, Rirī Shutorozekku)
A mysterious girl discovered by Thoma in a facility on the world of Ruwella. She was secured to a table when first discovered by Thoma; when he promised to assist her, she formed some kind of contract with him. The full effect of this bond is currently unknown, but it did grant Thoma use of the EC Divider and may have infected Thoma with "Eclipse." Lily uses telepathy to communicate with other people, and appears to be incapable of speaking normally or communicating with Devices. It is unknown whether Lily is human or not.
Isis Egret (アイシス・イーグレット, Aishisu Īguretto)
Originally from Midchilda, Isis was working as a tailor in a city on Ruwella when she encountered Thoma and Lily. After selling clothes to Lily, she proceeded to warn the two of the police's impending arrival and assist in their escape. From that point, she began traveling with the two.
Captain Nanoha Takamachi (高町 なのは, Takamachi Nanoha)
Nanoha is a Captain in the Time-Space Administration Bureau, working as an aerial forces combat instructor. She is well known for her central role in several prior incidents, including the Jail Scaglietti Incident. Many of the former members of Section Six (such as Nanoha), which played a central role in resolving that incident, are being recalled to assist in dealing with the new problems that are developing.
Investigator Fate T. Harlaown (フェイト・T・ハラオウン, Feito T. Haraōn)
Fate Testarossa is an Enforcer working for the Time-Space Administration Bureau. Fate and her partner Teana have been responsible for the main branch of the Time-Space Administration Bureau's investigation into the Dividers, the Huckebein family, and the "Eclipse" condition.
Naval Defense Force Investigation Commander Hayate Yagami (八神 はやて, Yagami Hayate)
The former commander of Section Six, Hayate Yagami is now a Naval Forces commander charged with investigating dangerous artifacts and their misuse. Currently, she is investigating the Book of the Silver Cross and the Divider, a pair of ancient Belkan artifacts.
Naval Defense Force Investigation Vice-Commander Reinforce II (リインフォースII, Rīnfōsu Tsuvai; Reinforce Zwei)
Reinforce is Hayate's unison device, and is currently serving as Hayate's aide in the investigation into the Book of the Silver Cross.
Captain Signum (シグナム, Shigunamu)
Signum is a lieutenant in the Time-Space Administration Bureau, currently reporting to Teana and assisting with her investigation into the Huckebein family. She is the first member of the Bureau to make direct contact with the Huckebein family over the course of this incident, engaging Cypha shortly after an incident at a church in Ruwella.
Veyron (ヴェイロン, Veiron)
Veyron is a member of the Huckebein family and the owner of the EC Divider, code 928. His long-term goals, as well as those of his organization, are currently unknown, but he has shown an interest in taking Thoma's Divider and in defeating or capturing Thoma himself. Thoma first met him at a church in Ruwella, where they fought for a short time before Veyron left.
Cypha (サイファー, Saifā)
Cypha is another member of the Huckebein family and the owner of the EC Divider, code 944. This particular Divider is named König, German for "king", and has the longest blade yet of any of the Dividers. Cypha was able to "react" it to deploy a seemingly more powerful form, in which it became a pair of long swords with a gun built into the right sword. Exact details of this "react" process and its functionality are unknown, but Cypha has referred to Lily herself as a "Reactor Plug" and called her reacted König "the poison that will kill the world", a phrase employed by other members of the Huckebein family in reference to the Dividers.
