= Magical Girl Lyrical Nanoha A's =

Japanese anime television series

- Cover from volume 1 of the Magical Girl Lyrical Nanoha A's DVD release

魔法少女リリカルなのはA's [エース] (Mahō Shōjo Ririkaru Nanoha Ēsu)
- Genre: Magical girl
- Created by: Masaki Tsuzuki
- Prequel
- Magical Girl Lyrical Nanoha (2004)
- Manga

Magical Girl Lyrical Nanoha A's THE COMICS
- Written by: Masaki Tsuzuki
- Illustrated by: Kōji Hasegawa
- Published by: Gakken
- Magazine: Megami Magazine
- Original run: July 31, 2005 – January 13, 2006
- Volumes: 1
- Anime television series
- Directed by: Keizō Kusakawa
- Produced by: Akio Mishima; Tatsuya Tanaka
- Written by: Masaki Tsuzuki
- Music by: Hiroaki Sano
- Studio: Seven Arcs
- Licensed by: NA: Discotek Media
- Original network: Chiba TV, Animax
- Original run: October 1, 2005 – December 25, 2005
- Episodes: 13
- Sequels
- Magical Girl Lyrical Nanoha StrikerS (2007); Magical Girl Lyrical Nanoha ViVid (2015); Magical Girl Lyrical Nanoha Exceeds Gun Blaze Vengeance (2026)
- Video game

Magical Girl Lyrical Nanoha A's Portable: The Battle of Aces
- Developer: WitchCraft
- Publisher: Namco Bandai
- Genre: Fighting game
- Platform: PlayStation Portable
- Released: January 21, 2010
- Video game

Magical Girl Lyrical Nanoha A's Portable: The Gears of Destiny
- Developer: WitchCraft
- Publisher: Namco Bandai
- Genre: Fighting game
- Platform: PlayStation Portable
- Released: December 22, 2011
- Anime film

Magical Girl Lyrical Nanoha: The Movie 2nd A's
- Directed by: Keizou Kusakawa
- Produced by: Akio Mishima; Tatsuya Tanaka; Hiroyuki Shimizu
- Written by: Masaki Tsuzuki
- Music by: Misa Chūjō
- Studio: Seven Arcs
- Released: July 14, 2012
- Runtime: 150 minutes
- icon

Magical Girl Lyrical Nanoha A's (魔法少女リリカルなのは エース, Mahō Shōjo Ririkaru Nanoha Ēsu) ("A's" is pronounced as "Ace") is an anime television series produced by Seven Arcs. It is the second anime in the Magical Girl Lyrical Nanoha franchise, following the previous series. The series aired in Japan between October 1, 2005, and December 25, 2005, and was licensed in North America by Geneon. A film adaptation, Magical Girl Lyrical Nanoha: The Movie 2nd A's, was released in Japanese theaters on July 14, 2012. The series has also spawned a manga accompaniment and two video game adaptations for the PlayStation Portable. It was succeeded by Magical Girl Lyrical Nanoha StrikerS in 2007.

== Plot ==
Six months following the events of the previous series, Nanoha Takamachi and Fate Testarossa have been exchanging video mails to tell each other of their situations on Earth and in the Time-Space Administration Bureau respectively. However, on the night Fate returns, Nanoha and her friends come into conflict with the Belkan Knights, Signum, Vita, Zafira, and Shamal, who are tasked with filling the pages of the Book of Darkness to protect their master, a wheelchair-using girl named Hayate Yagami. It is up to Nanoha, Fate and the Time-Space Administration Bureau to solve the mystery of the Book of Darkness, the Belkan Knights and their master.

== Media ==
=== Manga ===
A manga adaptation of the story was serialized in Gakken's Megami Magazine between August 2005 and January 2006 issues and was released in a single volume on February 18, 2006. The adaptation features many scenes not explored in the anime series.

=== Anime ===
Seven Arcs produced a thirteen-episode anime series, directed by Keizō Kusakawa and written by Masaki Tsuzuki. Broadcast on Chiba TV, TV Saitama, and TV Kanagawa, it premiered on October 1, 2005, and aired weekly until its conclusion on December 24, 2005. The music for the series was produced by Hiroaki Sano. The series features two pieces of theme music. "Eternal Blaze", performed by Nana Mizuki, is the opening theme. "Spiritual Garden", performed by Yukari Tamura, is the ending theme. In Japan, the series was released across six Region 2 DVD compilation volumes between January 25, 2006, and June 21, 2006.

Magical Girl Lyrical Nanoha A's was later licensed by Geneon for English-language dubbed release in the United States and Canada. Funimation distributed the dubbed series across a Region 1 DVD boxset.

==== Film ====
A theatrical film adaptation, titled Magical Girl Lyrical Nanoha: The Movie 2nd, was produced by Seven Arcs, following on from the 2010 adaptation of the first series, Magical Girl Lyrical Nanoha The Movie 1st, and was released in Japanese theaters on July 14, 2012. The film was released on Blu-ray Disc and DVD on March 22, 2013, and features an English subtitle track.

=== Audio CDs ===
A series of three drama CDs have been released by King Records between November 23, 2005, and March 8, 2006, entitled Magical Girl Lyrical Nanoha Sound Stage 01~03. The CDs take place during and after the anime series. Each release charted on the Oricon album charts, and the highest ranking album was the Magical Girl Lyrical Nanoha Sound Stage 03, which peak ranked at 52nd and remained on the chart for 2 weeks.

The original soundtrack was released across six CDs entitled Magical Girl Lyrical Nanoha A's Original Soundtrack Plus Vol.1~6 that were released alongside the DVD volumes that compiled the series' episodes containing 57 tracks in total. A compilation album entitled Magical Girl Lyrical Nanoha A's Vocal Best Collection was released exclusively at Comiket 70 in August 2006, compiling many of the pieces of music used during the drama CDs. King Records released three maxi singles for the series. "Eternal Blaze" was released on October 19, 2005. "Spiritual Garden" was released on October 26, 2005. "Super Generation" was released on January 18, 2006, that contained the track "Brave Phoenix", which was used as an insert to episode twelve of anime series.

=== Video games ===
Namco Bandai Games released a game adaptation, entitled Magical Girl Lyrical Nanoha A's Portable: The Battle of Aces, on January 21, 2010, for PlayStation Portable. It is a 3D fighting game with nine playable characters with multiple stories based on the A's storyline. A second game, Magical Girl Lyrical Nanoha A's Portable: The Gears of Destiny, was released on December 22, 2011, and features additional characters from the ViVid and Force manga series.

== Reception ==
As of August 5, the film had a box office gross of US$4,950,633. Its total gross was more than ¥500 million.
