= Magical Explorer =

Japanese light novel series and its adaptations

- Magical Explorer: Reborn as a Side Character in a Fantasy Dating Sim
- First light novel volume cover, featuring Ludivine Marie-Ange De La Tréfle (left) and Kōsuke Takioto (right)

マジカル★エクスプローラー エロゲの友人キャラに転生 したけど、ゲーム知識使って自由に生きる (Magikaru Ekusupurōrā: Eroge no Yūjin Chara ni Tensei Shita kedo, Gēmu Chishiki Tsukatte Jiyū ni Ikiru)
- Genre: Isekai
- Novel series
- Written by: Iris
- Published by: Shōsetsuka ni Narō
- Original run: February 26, 2018 – present
- Light novel
- Written by: Iris
- Illustrated by: Noboru Kannatsuki
- Published by: Kadokawa Shoten
- English publisher: NA: Yen Press
- Imprint: Kadokawa Sneaker Bunko
- Original run: November 1, 2019 – present
- Volumes: 14
- Manga
- Written by: Iris
- Illustrated by: Yukari Higa
- Published by: Kadokawa Shoten
- English publisher: NA: Yen Press
- Magazine: Young Ace Up
- Original run: August 20, 2020 – present
- Volumes: 4
- Anime television series
- Directed by: Kazuki Ohashi
- Produced by: Manabu Jinguuji; Tomoyuki Oowada; Ryouta Kanda; Yutaka Kusuno; Mitsuru Iida; Michio Kaiba; Yamato Kitamura; Shinichi Itou
- Written by: Satoko Sekine
- Music by: Kenichiro Suehiro
- Studio: White Fox
- Licensed by: Crunchyroll: SEA: Plus Media Networks Asia
- Original network: Tokyo MX, GYT, GTV, BS11, tbc, TVA, ytv
- Original run: October 4, 2026 – present
- Episodes: 6
- icon

Magical Explorer: Reborn as a Side Character in a Fantasy Dating Sim (Japanese: マジカル★エクスプローラー エロゲの友人キャラに転生 したけど、ゲーム知識使って自由に生きる, Hepburn: Magikaru Ekusupurōrā: Eroge no Yūjin Chara ni Tensei Shita kedo, Gēmu Chishiki Tsukatte Jiyū ni Ikiru) is a Japanese light novel series written by Iris. The series originated on the Shōsetsuka ni Narō website in February 2018, before being published in print with illustrations by Noboru Kannatsuki by Kadokawa Shoten beginning in November 2019. A manga adaptation, illustrated by Yukari Higa, began serialization on the Young Ace Up website in August 2020. An anime television series adaptation produced by White Fox premiered in October 2026.

== Plot ==
There is a bishōjo game that has become popular among Japanese gentlemen, named Magical Explorer, or Magiweo for short. The game's protagonist has a cheat-like power with twelve different beautiful heroines to engage with, including additional twelve heroines from the DLC, creating a harem of 24 women. Kosuke has not become that protagonist. Instead, he has become the third-wheel character who always laughing next to the protagonist. There is no heroine who would look at him.

Kosuke is more focused on his discovery of magic than the protagonist and heroines. He decided to abandon his role as a protagonist's friend to train his magic and become the strongest. Although Kosuke is training to beat the man who can single-handedly defeat the demon king, he ends up in situations where he develops feelings for the heroines.

== Characters ==
Kōsuke Takioto (瀧音幸助, Takioto Kōsuke)
Voiced by: Nobunaga Shimazaki (Japanese); Alex Mai (English)
Kosuke is the main character of the series. In the game, he serves as a supporting character and best friend to the protagonist. He often fulfilled the role of comic relief, hiding the sorrow from his loneliness from having no family at home. The reincarnated version, aware of the game's storyline, wants to become a powerful fighter so he can protect the girls living with him and make all of them happy. Due to his low amount of inherent magic, Kosuke has trained to use his scarf as a weapon.
Marino Hanamura (花邑 毬乃, Hanamura Marino)
Voiced by: Mai Fuchigami (Japanese); Madeleine Norton (English)
Marino serves as Principal of Tsukuyomi Magic Academy. In the game, she is revealed to be Kōsuke's maternal relative, his mother's cousin. She becomes his financial benefactor while Kōsuke attends the academy as well as training him on how to properly use magic. Marino tends to jump to conclusions when she sees people in compromising situations caused by accidents.
Hatsumi Hanamura (花邑 はつみ, Hanamura Hatsumi)
Voiced by: Minami Tsuda (Japanese); Ezra Vervin (English)
Marino's daughter and an academy instructor, she has been continuing her deceased father's research. She and Kousuke had a terrible first meeting after he walked in on her naked while Hatsumi was using the bathroom. Initially, Kousuke wanted her help to increase her power. However, after she cooks a terrible meal and he eats it to spare her feelings, Hatsumi becomes attracted to him. She is even flattered when other people, like Nanami, describe her as Kousuke's wife.
Ludie (リュディ, Ryudi) /Ludivine Marie-Ange De La Tréfle (リュディヴィーヌ・マリー＝アンジュ・ド・ラ・トレーフル, Ryudiv~uīnu Marī-Anju Do Ra Torēfuru)
Voiced by: Ai Kakuma (Japanese); Kayla Temshiv (English)
Ludie is an elf who is one of the main heroines of the game; she is the second daughter of the Tréfle emperor. She is known to come off as tsundere due to trust issues stemming from a betrayal. She ends up staying with Kōsuke and Marino after he saves her during a terrorist attack, and ends up becoming infatuated with Kōsuke.
Claris (クラリス, Kurarisu)
Voiced by: Risa Tsumugi (Japanese); Krystal LaPorte (English)
Claris is Ludie's maid and bodyguard. She was an old friend of Hatsumi who helped her solve her efficiency issues with casting a spell.
Nanami (ななみ)
Voiced by: Mao Ichimichi (Japanese); Amanda Gael (English)
Nanami is a special maid created by the assist Dungeon Masters, one of the few of the angel race left. She is naughty due to being an eroge character, but loyal to Kōsuke as his personal maid.
Yukine Mizumori (水守雪音, Mizumori Yukine)
Voiced by: Saori Ōnishi (Japanese); Terri Doty (English)
Yukine is a student of Tsukuyomi Magical Academy and a lieutant of its Morals Committee. A skilled fighter, she uses a naginata in battle.
Iori Hijiri (聖 伊織, Hijiri Iori)
Voiced by: Asaki Yuikawa (Japanese); Dee Meo (English)
The protagonist of the game, Iori does not get much attention in the story due to Kōsuke not staying to the game script.
Rina Katō (加藤 里菜, Katō Rina)
Voiced by: Hikaru Tono

== Media ==
=== Light novel ===
Written by Iris, Magical Explorer began publication on the novel-posting website Shōsetsuka ni Narō on February 26, 2018. The series was later acquired by Kadokawa Shoten, who began publishing the series in print with illustrations by Noboru Kannatsuki on November 1, 2019. As of October 2026, fourteen volumes have been released. Yen Press is publishing the light novel adaptation in English.

==== Volumes ====
No.	Original release date	Original ISBN	English release date	English ISBN
1	November 1, 2019	978-4-04-108371-0	December 14, 2021	978-1-9753-2561-9
2	March 1, 2020	978-4-04-108372-7	May 3, 2022	978-1-9753-2563-3
3	August 1, 2020	978-4-04-109541-6	October 18, 2022	978-1-9753-2565-7
4	January 29, 2021	978-4-04-109542-3	April 11, 2023	978-1-9753-5048-2
5	July 1, 2021	978-4-04-111408-7	July 18, 2023	978-1-9753-5051-2
6	February 1, 2022	978-4-04-111409-4	December 12, 2023	978-1-9753-6755-8
7	September 1, 2022	978-4-04-112667-7	April 16, 2024	978-1-9753-7253-8
8	April 28, 2023	978-4-04-112668-4	September 17, 2024	978-1-9753-9158-4
9	September 29, 2023	978-4-04-114181-6	April 8, 2025	979-8-8554-0532-3
10	March 29, 2024	978-4-04-114699-6	August 12, 2025	979-8-8554-1455-4
11	November 29, 2024	978-4-04-115318-5	March 10, 2026	979-8-8554-2194-1
12	October 1, 2025	978-4-04-116639-0	November 10, 2026	979-8-8554-3799-7
13	April 1, 2026	978-4-04-117275-9	—	—
14	October 1, 2026	978-4-04-117798-3	—	—
AD	December 1, 2026	978-4-04-118020-4	—	—

=== Manga ===
A manga adaptation, illustrated by Yukari Higa, began serialization on Kadokawa Shoten's Young Ace Up manga website on August 20, 2020. The series went on hiatus in June 2021 due to Higa's health. As of October 2026, the series' individual chapters have been collected into four tankōbon volumes. Yen Press also published the manga adaptation in English.

==== Volumes ====
No.	Original release date	Original ISBN	English release date	English ISBN
1	March 10, 2021	978-4-04-111007-2	July 12, 2022	978-1-9753-4300-2
2	March 8, 2024	978-4-04-113414-6	January 21, 2025	979-8-8554-0958-1
3	January 8, 2026	978-4-04-116901-8	February 23, 2027	979-8-8554-4369-1
4	October 2, 2026	978-4-04-117757-0	—	—

=== Anime ===
An anime adaptation was announced during Kadokawa's "Sneaker Bunko 35th Anniversary Festa!" livestream on September 24, 2023. It was later confirmed to be a television series produced by White Fox and directed by Kazuki Ohashi, with Satoko Sekine handling series composition, Ryosuke Kimiya designing the characters, and Kenichiro Suehiro composing the music. It premiered with double episodes on October 4, 2026, on Tokyo MX and other networks. The opening theme song is "Remedy", and the ending theme song is "Double Wings", both performed by Asca. Crunchyroll is streaming the series. Plus Media Networks Asia licensed the series in Southeast Asia for broadcast on Aniplus Asia.

=== Episode list ===
All episodes written by Satoko Sekine.

List of Magical Explorer episodes
No.	Title	Directed by	Storyboard by	Original release date
1	"Reincarnated as a Sidekick Character in an Eroge, but I'll Use My Game Knowledge to Do What I Want"; Transliteration: "Eroge no Yūjin Chara ni Tensei Shita kedo, Gēmu Chishiki Tsukatte Jiyū ni Ikiru" (エロゲの友人キャラに転生したけど、ゲーム知識使って自由に生きる)	Kazuki Ohashi	Kazuki Ohashi	October 3, 2026
2	"Greetings from the Land of the Elves"; Transliteration: "Erufu no Kuni kara no Aisatsu" (エルフの国からの挨拶)	Hiroyuki Tsuchiya	Kazuhiro Ozawa (Note: Credited under the penname Saionji Kageyasu (西園寺影安).)	October 10, 2026
3	"Staples of Any Eroge"; Transliteration: "Eroge ni wa Kanarazu Aru Mono" (エロゲには必ずあるもの)	Satoru Yamashita	Satoru Yamashita	October 17, 2026
4	"Determination"; Transliteration: "Ketsui" (決意)	Shougo Arai	Shougo Arai	October 24, 2026
5	"Welcome, Tsukuyomi Magic Academy"; Transliteration: "Yōkoso, Tsukuyomi Mahō Gakuen e" (ようこそ、月詠魔法学園へ)	Yasuaki Fujiwara	Yasuaki Fujiwara	October 31, 2026
6	"Stormy Skies! Carplin Castle"; Transliteration: "Fūun! Giyoburin-jō" (風雲！ギヨブリン城)	Hiroyuki Tsuchiya	Yuuzou Satou	November 7, 2026
7	"And, From Here"; Transliteration: "Soshite, Kore Kara" (そして、これから)	Shun Tsuchida	Hiroaki Yoshikawa	November 14, 2026
8	"That's a Pink Bomb"; Transliteration: "Sore wa Pinku no Bakudan" (それはピンクの爆弾)	TBA	TBA	November 21, 2026

== Reception ==
The novel has 50,000,000 views on the Shōsetsuka ni Narō website.

Rebecca Silverman of Anime News Network praised the illustrations, but criticized the female characters as lacking development. On the story, she wrote "from the very first sentence, we know what we're getting into, and luckily, it does it decently well". Demelza of Anime UK News felt the series was an isekai series with a service, but Demelza was critical of the writing system.

== See also ==
- Goblin Slayer, another light novel series with the same illustrator
