= Triangle Heart =

- Triangle Heart: Sweet Songs Forever poster
- Genre: Eroge
- Developer: ivory
- Publisher: Janis
- Platform: Microsoft Windows
- First release: Triangle Heart; December 18, 1998
- Latest release: Triangle Heart 3: Lyrical Toy Box; June 29, 2001

- Triangle Heart

とらいあんぐるハート (Toraianguru Hāto)
- Genre: Action, Romance
- Original video animation

Triangle Heart: Sazanami Joshiryō
- Directed by: Satoshi Saga
- Studio: Mook
- Released: 28 August 2000 – 26 April 2002
- Episodes: 5
- Original video animation

Triangle Hearts ~Sweet Songs Forever~ Sound Stage VA
- Directed by: Kenji Nakamura (1); Keizō Kusakawa (2); Kazunori Mizuno (3); Akiyuki Shinbo (4)
- Produced by: Tatsuya Tanaka
- Studio: Seven Arcs (Note: Production assistance (\制作協力) for all episodes provided by Arcturus.)
- Released: August 9, 2002
- Episodes: 4
- Original video animation

Triangle Heart: Sweet Songs Forever
- Directed by: Akiyuki Shinbo
- Produced by: Akio Mishima; Tatsuya Tanaka
- Written by: Masaki Tsuzuki
- Music by: Hiroaki Sano
- Studio: Seven Arcs
- Released: 24 July 2003 – 26 December 2003
- Episodes: 4
- Related
- Magical Girl Lyrical Nanoha (spinoff)

Triangle Heart (とらいあんぐるハート, Toraianguru Hāto), abbreviated as Toraha, is a series of eroge by Janis and OVAs by Mook and Seven Arcs that is best known for its spin-off series, Magical Girl Lyrical Nanoha. The name comes from the fact that each game focuses on a "triangle" of one boy and two girls, though there are many other heroines. The first game in the trilogy was published December 18, 1998.

The 2000 - 2002 Triangle Heart: Sazanami Joshiryō (とらいあんぐるハート さざなみ女子寮) adult OVA, based on the game Triangle Heart 2, focuses on an all-girl dorm and Kousuke, its male temporary manager.

The 2003 Triangle Heart: Sweet Songs Forever (とらいあんぐるハート～Sweet Songs Forever～) OVA, based on the game Triangle Heart 3, focuses on a boy named Kyōya Takamachi who, with his cousin-turned-sister, vows to protect a childhood friend from a mysterious terrorist organization.

There have also been two fanbox games, Love Love Toy Box, based on Triangle Heart and Triangle Heart 2, and Lyrical Toy Box, based on Triangle Heart 3.

The three main games and the two fanboxes were later republished as a single DVD title on 14 June 2002.

Three manga were made for the series. Two versions of Triangle Heart 3: Sweet Songs Forever were published, one by KSS (4 volumes), and the other by SOFTBANK Publishing Inc. (1 volume). Sweet Songs Forever 4 koma KINGS was published by Studio DNA.

== Plot ==
Triangle Heart: Years ago, professional bodyguard Shirō Fuwa and his client Albert Crystela were killed by a terrorist organization that is known by the symbol of a clover leaf. Albert's daughter Fiasse blamed herself, but then grew closer to the Fuwa (now Takamachi) children, Kyōya and Miyuki, and decided to use her gift of singing to help the world. But now that they have grown up, Fiasse herself is being targeted by the same organization. Kyōya and Miyuki, swearing to protect Fiasse, become professional bodyguards like their father.

Triangle Heart 2: Sazanami Joshiryō: Kosuke Makihara works as a substitute janitor of a huge boarding house called Sazanami Dormitory mostly consisting of young girls from grades of elementary school through high school, while the regular janitor and the dorm's owner, who is his brother-in-law Keigo and his aunt Kana respectively, are traveling abroad in Hong Kong, China. The story follows the lives of Kousuke and the girls and introduces each them one by one.

Triangle Heart 3: Sweet Songs Forever: A mysterious organization keeps sending intimidating letters to Fiasse Christella, the principal of British Christella Music Academy. The purpose is to find the whereabouts of Fiasse's inheritance; although Fiasse already has a bodyguard, Ellis McGaren, she asked her childhood friends, the siblings Takamachi Kyouya and Miyuki to help Ellis. This, of course, is received by Ellis, as a professional bodyguard, with a cold shoulder. Kyouya remembered an incident that happened several years ago, when he was about ten years old. This incident was actually aimed at Fiasse's father, Senator Albert Christella.

== Characters ==
=== Triangle Heart ===
==== Main character ====
- Shinichirō Aikawa (相川 真一郎, Aikawa Shinichirō)

The hero of this game, Shinichirō is short, bland and very inept at dealing with women. However, what he lacks in tact, he makes up for with a sincere desire to help the people around him. He is a beginner in the art of karate and proud of his cooking skills.

==== Major heroines ====
- Yuiko Takashiro (鷹城 唯子, Takashiro Yuiko)

This young girl has a vast talent for martial arts, but does not put it to use. She is normally very naive, but when she speaks one-on-one with Shinichirō, he can tell that she actually has a sharp mind. She is shown to be inept at domestic activities such as cleaning.

- Kotori Nonomura (野々村 小鳥, Nonomura Kotori)

Kotori lives with Shinichirō as a childhood friend. She is very small and is often mistaken for a student in elementary school, which offends her to the point of a complex. She taught Shinichirō how to cook. She is very shy, and a good friend of Sakura. Like the later character Fiasse Crystela, Kotori is a talented singer.

- Izumi Mitsurugi (御剣 いづみ, Mitsurugi Izumi)

A classmate of Shinichirō, and a tomboy who dresses in the boys' uniform. She treats Shinichirō as a buddy and considers herself "one of the guys", but she has a deep and caring soul which others consider feminine. Izumi trains especially for patience, and lives alone.

- Sakura Kidō (綺堂 さくら, Kidō Sakura)

Shinichirō's junior, Sakura is half-German, half-Japanese. She is very sickly and spends a lot of time in the nurse's ward. Despite this, she is seen as "cool" and is the most popular girl in school. In Triangle Heart 3, she is Shinobu's aunt and the creator of Noel.

- Hitomi Sendō (千堂 瞳, Sendō Hitomi)

Hitomi, Yuiko's senior, is the captain of a national-level self-defence team. Kind, wise, beautiful and strong, she has many fans. However, she has a deep and secret anger against an old boyfriend that was unfaithful to her. She has one older sister.

==== Family and friends ====
- Yung-fa Tō (兎 弓華 (ト・ユンファ), To Yunfa)

Before she was an assassin in Triangle Heart 3, Yung-fa was just a normal Chinese exchange student. She appears during the second half of the game.

- Nanase Haruhara (春原 七瀬, Haruhara Nanase)

Nanase is a mysterious glowing girl that appears mysteriously in the school. She wears a black uniform rather than the one that the students use.

- Nanaka Inoue (井上ななか, Inoue Nanaka)

Nanaka is Yuiko's junior, a bright and energetic girl.

- Daisuke Hashijima (端島 大輔, Hashijima Daisuke)

He is Shinichirō's classmate, and the only other male character, filling a role much like Jun Kitagawa of Kanon.

=== Triangle Heart 2 & Triangle Heart: Sazanami Joshiryō OVA ===
==== Main character ====
- Kōsuke Makihara (槙原耕介, Makihara Kousuke)

==== Major heroines ====
- Yuuhi Shiina (椎名 ゆうひ, Shiina Yuuhi) (Voice: Kanon Torii)
- Kaoru Kanzaki (神咲 薫, Kanzaki Kaoru) (Voice: Rio Mutsuki)
- Chika Nimura (仁村 知佳, Nimura Chika) (Voice: Hina Nishimura)
- Lhissty Cinclair Crawford (リスティ・C・クロフォード, Lhissty C. Crawford) (Voice: Natsumi Otono)

==== Family and friends ====
- Ai Makihara (槙原 愛, Makihara Ai) (Voice: Shizuka Yuna)
- Mayuki Nimura (仁村 真雪, Nimura Mayuki) (Voice: Akira Fujisawa)
- Izayoi (十六夜) (Voice: Mizuki Oda)
- Minami Okamoto (岡本 みなみ, Okamoto Minami) (Voice: Makoto Otsuka)
- Mio Jinnai (陣内 美緒, Jinnai Mio) (Voice: Himawari Natsuno)
- Nozomi Fujita (藤田 望, Fujita Nozomi) (Voice: Rio Mutsuki)
- Yuuko Kageura (景浦 裕子, Kageura Yuko)
- Nami Kanzaki (神咲 那美, Kanzaki Nami)
- Mikazuki (御架月)
- Hayumi Kanzaki (神咲 葉弓, Kanzaki Hayumi)
- Kaede Kanzaki (神咲 楓, Kanzaki Kaede)
- Keigo Jinnai (陣内 啓吾, Jinnai Keigo)
- Kana Makihara (槙原 神奈, Makihara Kana)

==== Villains ====
- Ryu Hakue (ハクエ リュウ, Hakue Ryu)

=== Triangle Heart 3 & Triangle Heart: Sweet Songs Forever OVA ===
==== Main characters ====
- Kyouya Takamachi (高町 恭也, Takamachi Kyōya) (Voice: Hikaru Midorikawa)

A kind and beautiful person, Kyōya is the hero of the story. He is the inheritor of the Mikami-ryuu and Fuwa-ryuu sword styles and is teaching them to his sister Miyuki. Kyōya is dedicated to his sword and is quick to prove wrong anyone who believes the sword is an "outdated" weapon.

- Miyuki Takamachi (高町 美由希, Takamachi Miyuki) (Voice: Satomi Kodama)

Miyuki does not really feel any passion for sword fighting, but does it because she wants to honour Shirō and protect Fiasse. Her father and extended family were killed by the clover-leaf terrorist organization, so she was adopted by Shirō while her biological mother sought revenge.

- Fiasse Crystela (フィアッセ・クリステラ, Fiasse Kurisutera) (Voice: Minami Nagasaki, singing voice: Kotoko)

Fiasse is a world-renowned singer and heiress, and the childhood friend of Kyōya and Miyuki to whom she is an older sister figure. For unknown reasons, most likely relating to her inheritance, her family has been targeted by terrorists. Her late father, Albert, was a senator. She comes from England, but lives in Uminari City during the game and returns to Crystela Song School in the OVAs.

- Ellis McGaren (エリス・マクガーレン, Erisu Makugāren) (Voice: Chiemi Ishimatsu)

A character from the OVAs, Ellis is Fiasse's real (read: paid) bodyguard, and jealous of Kyōya and Miyuki. However, her antipathy towards them stems from more than just a fear of being replaced. They are part of her past, a past which she would like to deny...

- Shinobu Tsukimura (月村 忍, Tsukimura Shinobu) (voice: Yuki Iwata)

The "main heroine" in the dating sim sense, i.e. Kyōya's canonical girlfriend. Shinobu's family is almost as rich as Fiasse's, but her mysterious parents were disliked by the rest of the family, and after their death, she was left alone. However, a kindly aunt (the grown-up Sakura Kidō) made her a guardian in Noel. Shinobu knows Kyōya from school and works at his family's cafe, Midori-ya. She also appears to have an interest in mechanics.

==== Major heroines ====
- Akira Jōshima (城島 晶, Jōshima Akira)

Akira is a friend of the Takamachi family, who got a scholarship in Uminari City and so moved into the Midori-ya. She sees Kyōya as her "teacher" of sorts, as Akira is a martial artist. A good cook, and one of the two "combat waitresses"- her best friend and rival is Ren, whom she calls "turtle" because of her green hair and love of turtles.

- Feng Lianfei (鳳 蓮飛(フォウ・レンフェイ), Fō Renfei)

The other "combat waitress", the best friend of Akira and also her rival in martial arts. Ren, as she likes to be called, also lives with the Takamachi family so that she can continue to go to school, because her grandfather, whom she had been living with, returned to China. She practices bōjutsu. Like Akira, she is a good cook. She calls Akira "monkey".

- Kuon (久遠, Kuon)

Kuon is Nami's pet fox, who has an affinity for Nanoha as well. However, she is actually a kitsune and transforms into a foxgirl. Kuon has lived for centuries and once flew into a rage after her human lover was killed. She was cursed to live forever, but was sealed into the form of a helpless young fox until the Kanzaki family could become powerful enough to either save or destroy her. Kuon eventually learns to love humans again.

- Nami Kanzaki (神咲那美, Kanzaki Nami) (voice: Yura Hinata)

Nami is a kindly miko and Miyuki's best friend from class. Kuon is her pet, whom she wishes to protect despite her origins.

- Noel K. Ehrlichkeit (ノエル・K・エーアリヒカイト, Noeru K Ēarihikaito)

Noel is Shinobu's robotic maid, built by her aunt Sakura to be her constant companion.

- Filith Yazawa (フィリス・矢沢, Firisu Yazawa)

Filith is a young doctor that worries about Kyōya's battle injuries. In the original game, she was a minor character, but was popular enough to be promoted to heroine in the game in Lyrical Toy Box.

==== Family and friends ====
- Shirō Takamachi (高町 士郎, Takamachi Shirō)

The deceased father of Kyōya and, by adoption, Miyuki. He continued on the family tradition of bodyguarding. He was killed by a bomb, and wished to protect everyone, not just his client.

- Momoko Takamachi (高町 桃子, Takamachi Momoko)

Shirō's second wife, she was pregnant with Nanoha when he died. She now owns the Midori-ya (翠屋, Midori ya) cafe, after retiring from her job as a top chef.

- Nanoha Takamachi (高町 なのは, Takamachi Nanoha) (Voice: Minami Hokuto/Hitomi)

Nanoha is the youngest Takamachi, and has no need for swords, as she, around twelve years old, is almost completely removed from the conflict. She is a cheerful girl who makes friends with even those that hate humanity. She is the protagonist in the spinoff Magical Girl Lyrical Nanoha franchise.

- Alisa Lowell (アリサ・ローウェル, Arisa Rōweru)

Known as Alisa Bannings in Magical Girl Lyrical Nanoha, Alisa is a bitter young girl around Nanoha's age. She holds a grudge against all people, but somehow befriends Nanoha after Kuon has turned good. Alisa is actually a wandering spirit seeking rest after she was kidnapped and brutally murdered. In the Lyrical Toy Box game, even though she has passed to the spirit realm, her influence is felt everywhere. Nanoha meets Lindy at Alisa's grave.

- Tiore Crystela (ティオレ・クリステラ, Tiore Kurisutera)

Fiasse's mother, Tiore, is the aging director of the famed Crystela Song School. She trusts the Takamachi children implicitly. In the OVAs, she has died and left Fiasse with an inheritance that she can claim once she reaches a certain age or marries.

- Irene Noa (Voice: Haruka Nagami)

Fiasse's advisor and a member of the faculty of Crystela Song School.

==== Clover organization ====
- Yung-fa Tō (兎 弓華 (ト・ユンファ), To Yunfa) (Voice: Mari Tomokawa)

See Characters in Triangle Heart. Yung-fa, in this game, is a Chinese assassin. Once she fell in love, she left the organization and is now being hunted by it.

- Slicer (スライサー, Suraisaa)

The Slicer is a masochistic assassin under the employ of The Fan. He laughs whenever he gets hit and challenges his opponents to fight harder.

- Irein (イレイン, Irein)

She and her five clones attack the Tsukimura mansion.

- The Fan (ザ・ファン, Za Fan)

An old pervert with an obsession over Fiasse Christella. He is responsible for the death of Albert and Shirō.

- Misato Mikami (御神 美沙斗, Mikami Misato) (Voice: Mitsuki Saiga)

Misato is actually Miyuki's biological mother, who infiltrated the organization and worked her way up to learn the leader's name. She was about to with a certain mission- killing Fiasse Crystela- but was stopped by her own children. She then left and became the leader of Hong Kong Defence Group. In the OVA, Misato is the commanding officer of the Hong Kong Intelligence Defence Squad's 4th Division, and plans to recruit Kyōya and Miyuki into her team.
