= Yukari Higa =

Japanese manga artist

Yukari Higa 緋賀 ゆかり
- Occupation: Manga artist
- Website: Highway Star

Yukari Higa (緋賀 ゆかり, Higa Yukari) is a Japanese manga artist from Miyagi Prefecture. She has also published doujin under the name Nodoame Ishida (石田のどあめ, Ishida Nodoame).

== Works ==
=== Manga ===
- Magical Record Lyrical Nanoha Force
- Kiddy Girl-and Pure
- Shina Dark
- Holy Hearts!
- Sekai Seifuku Monogatari
- Harem Royale -When the Game Ends-
- Moto Kizoku Reijō de Mikon no Haha Desu ga, Musume-tachi ga Kawai Sugite Bōkenshagyō mo Ku ni Narimasen
- Magical Explorer

=== Games ===
- Sakura Sakura
