= Magical Girl Lyrical Nanoha (series) =

Japanese multimedia franchise

- Series logo

魔法少女リリカルなのは (Mahō Shōjo Ririkaru Nanoha)
- Genre: Magical girl, science fantasy
- Created by: Masaki Tsuzuki

Magical Girl Lyrical Nanoha (Japanese: 魔法少女リリカルなのは, Hepburn: Mahō Shōjo Ririkaru Nanoha) is a Japanese multimedia franchise that encompasses five anime television series, four theatrical films, multiple manga and drama CD adaptations and sequels, as well as model figures, plastic models and toys from Bandai. Its inaugural installment was the 2004 television series of the same name, an alternate universe spin-off of the Triangle Heart series.

The series is named after its protagonist Nanoha Takamachi. At the beginning of the series, Nanoha is a 9-year old schoolgirl in modern-day Japan, who is swept into a conflict between extra-dimensional powers vying for control over magical artifacts they had discovered on Earth. Nanoha herself is revealed to be tremendously powerful in the extra-dimensional techno-magic and in later installments, leaves Earth altogether to pursue a magical career. In the latest entry, Magical Record Lyrical Nanoha Force, she is 25. Nanoha's role has gradually diminished in later installments, and she only appears briefly in the 2016 spin-off anime ViVid Strike!.

== Origins ==
Nanoha Takamachi first appeared as a minor character in the eroge visual novel Triangle Heart 3, released on December 8, 2000. She was first cast as a magical girl on a merchandise CD Triangle Heart 3 ~Lyrical Toy Box~, released on June 29, 2001. Nanoha's first animated appearance was in the first episode of Triangle Heart 3 OVA adaptation, released on July 24, 2003. All three titles, as well as the entire spin-off franchise starring Nanoha, were written by Masaki Tsuzuki (都築真紀, Tsuzuki Masaki).

== Overview ==
=== Main timeline ===
In the plot premise of the original series, Magical Girl Lyrical Nanoha (2004), 21 "Jewel Seeds", highly destructive artifacts from another dimension, are accidentally scattered across Earth. After Nanoha assists an injured extradimensional magician in collecting them, she is drawn into a magical battle against a female mage named Fate Testarossa, who came to Earth to collect Jewel Seeds for her mother Precia. Attracted by their activity, the interdimensional police TSAB ("Time-Space Administration Bureau") intervenes to secure and to seal the artifacts. In the end, Nanoha convinces Fate to rebel against Precia, who is defeated and apparently dies.

In Magical Girl Lyrical Nanoha A's (2005), Nanoha continues her magical training. Six months after the original series, she and Fate encounter the "Wolkenritter", four magic knights who steal others' magical abilities to save Hayate Yagami, a wheelchair-using Japanese girl. Since the Wolkenritter are skilled in Ancient Belkan combat magic far superior to theirs, Nanoha and Fate fail to stop them and the Book of Darkness, an ancient artifact bound to Hayate, is activated. A worldwide catastrophe is only prevented thanks to TSAB and most importantly, Hayate's intervention. In the following years, all primary characters leave Earth to pursue magical careers in the TSAB homeworld Midchilda.

Magical Girl Lyrical Nanoha StrikerS (2007) takes place ten years after A's and is set on Midchilda. Hayate, now a Lieutenant Colonel of TSAB, forms a special Riot Force 6 to counter the impending terrorist crisis organized by Dr. Scaglietti, a former colleague and accomplice of Precia Testarossa, and his combat cyborgs ("Numbers"). Nanoha, Fate, and the Wolkenritter join the unit, along with four young mages whom they personally train ("Forwards"). Despite their preparations, the unit fails to protect Vivio, a girl targeted by Scaglietti and adopted by Nanoha, and the crisis strikes in full force, stopped in the nick of time by Riot Force 6's heroic efforts. The unit is then dissolved, with its members returning to their original posts.

A Drama CD titled Magical Girl Lyrical Nanoha StrikerS Sound Stage X (2008) is set three years after the Jail Scaglietti Incident. It features the characters first introduced in StrikerS, mainly the Forwards and the Numbers, investigating a serial murder case on Midchilda. Their investigation eventually leads them to the Mariage [sic], semi-sentient humanoid weapons from the Ancient Belkan era, and their elusive creator, Dark King Ixpellia.

Vivio's story is continued in the manga Magical Girl Lyrical Nanoha ViVid (2009-2017), which is set four years after StrikerS. Vivio now attends a magical academy on Midchilda, where she meets Einhart Stratos, another descendant of the Ancient Belkan royalty. Together with their friends, the two of them participate in the Inter-Middle, a magical combat tournament for young mages. A spin-off anime series, ViVid Strike! (2016), stars a teen magical martial artist Fuka Reventon, who trains under Einhart for a rematch against her estranged childhood friend, Rinne Berlinetta.

Another manga, Magical Record Lyrical Nanoha Force (2009-2013, on hiatus), set six years after StrikerS, focuses on a new protagonist, Thoma Avenir. After Thoma rescues a mute girl named Lily Strosek on remote world, he unwittingly becomes a fugitive from TSAB. The ex-members of Riot Force 6 join forces once again to avert a new crisis caused by dangerous Ancient Belkan legacy, the Book of the Silver Cross, to which Lily is apparently connected, and the Hückebein family, an interdimensional terrorist cell with sights on Thoma.

=== Alternate timelines ===
The PlayStation Portable video game Magical Girl Lyrical Nanoha A's Portable: The Battle of Aces (2010) is set in an alternate timeline which diverges from the main series at the end of the second anime series. In it, Nanoha and Fate refuse to seal Reinforce, allowing the Book of Darkness to regenerate its defenses and use the heroes' own dark clones to attack them. In the sequel, The Gears of Destiny (2011), the heroines must battle time-traveling humanoid Gears for the future of their respective worlds, and even meet characters from the future (of the main timeline).

The first two theatric movies were largely faithful adaptations of the first two anime seasons, but starting with Magical Girl Lyrical Nanoha Reflection (2017), the movies' continuity sharply diverged from the main one by cross-introducing the Gears (who are human in this continuity) to the Earth after Reinforce had been sealed. Magical Girl Lyrical Nanoha Detonation (2018) concludes the story arc that started in Reflection.

Magical Girl Lyrical Nanoha Innocent (2012-2014) is a spin-off manga series set in a universe parallel to the main franchise, where the main characters are ordinary girls who battle each other in a magical card game called "Brave Duel". A follow-up sequel manga, Magical Girl Lyrical Nanoha Innocents (2014-2016), featuring younger Subaru and Teana was published after the first spin-off ended.

== Media ==
=== Anime ===
To date, there have been three anime television series produced by Seven Arcs. The first series, Magical Girl Lyrical Nanoha, aired in Japan between October and December 2004. The second series, Magical Girl Lyrical Nanoha A's, aired between October and December 2005. The third series, Magical Girl Lyrical Nanoha StrikerS, aired between April and September 2007. The first two series were licensed in North America by Geneon and distributed by Funimation Entertainment. A theatrical retelling of the first series, Magical Girl Lyrical Nanoha The Movie 1st, was released in theaters on January 23, 2010, with an adaptation of the second series, Magical Girl Lyrical Nanoha The Movie 2nd A's, released on July 14, 2012. The third and fourth movies, Magical Girl Lyrical Nanoha Reflection and Magical Girl Lyrical Nanoha Detonation, released in 2017 and 2018, have an original story based on elements from the A's Portable games. Reflection was released on July 22, 2017, while Detonation was released on October 19, 2018. An anime television adaptation of the Magical Girl Lyrical Nanoha ViVid manga series aired between April and June 2015, and was produced by A-1 Pictures. In 2016, a new original anime was released, ViVid Strike!, once again animated by Seven Arcs, which focuses on new original characters, Fuka and Rinne. A new anime television series, titled Magical Girl Lyrical Nanoha Exceeds Gun Blaze Vengeance, was announced as part of the series' 20th anniversary on December 28, 2024.

Title	Timeline	Format	Start date	End date	Episodes	Chronology
Magical Girl Lyrical Nanoha (魔法少女リリカルなのは)	Main	TV	2004-10-01	2004-12-24	13	0065
Magical Girl Lyrical Nanoha A's (魔法少女リリカルなのは エース)	Main	TV	2005-10-01	2005-12-24	13	0065–66
Magical Girl Lyrical Nanoha StrikerS (魔法少女リリカルなのはStrikerS)	Main	TV	2007-04-01	2007-09-23	26	0075–76
Magical Girl Lyrical Nanoha The Movie 1st (魔法少女リリカルなのは The MOVIE 1st)	Movie	Film	2010-01-23	N/A	N/A	0065
Magical Girl Lyrical Nanoha The Movie 2nd A's (魔法少女リリカルなのは The MOVIE 2nd A's)	Movie	Film	2012-07-14	N/A	N/A	0065–66
Magical Girl Lyrical Nanoha ViVid (魔法少女リリカルなのはViVid)	Main	TV	2015-04-03	2015-06-19	12	0079
ViVid Strike! (ヴィヴィッド・ストライク)	Main	TV	2016-10-02	2016-12-18	12	0080–81
Magical Girl Lyrical Nanoha Reflection (魔法少女リリカルなのは Reflection)	Movie	Film	2017-07-22	N/A	N/A	0067
Magical Girl Lyrical Nanoha Detonation (魔法少女リリカルなのは Detonation)	Movie	Film	2018-10-19	N/A	N/A	0067-68
Magical Girl Lyrical Nanoha Exceeds Gun Blaze Vengeance (魔法少女リリカルなのは EXCEEDS Gun Blaze Vengeance)	Movie	TV	2026-07-05	2026-09-20	12	0069

=== Print ===
Magical Girl Lyrical Nanoha novel is an adaptation of the first season, while the A's manga and StrikerS THE COMICS are collections of short side-stories expanding the respective anime series. ViVid and Force are standalone, independent story arcs that take place several years after the events of StrikerS. The MOVIE 1st manga, similar to the A's and StrikerS manga series, expand on the storyline of the movie. Innocent is set in a parallel world to the main franchise.

Title	Timeline	Format	Start date	End date	Volumes	Chronology
Magical Girl Lyrical Nanoha (魔法少女リリカルなのは)	Main	Novel	2005-09-30	N/A	1	0065
Magical Girl Lyrical Nanoha A's THE COMICS (魔法少女リリカルなのはA's THE COMIC)	Main	Manga	2005-07-31	2006-01-13	1	0065–66
Magical Girl Lyrical Nanoha StrikerS THE COMICS (魔法少女リリカルなのはStrikerS THE COMICS)	Main	Manga	2006-9-30	2007-12-27	2	0071–76
Magical Record Lyrical Nanoha Force (魔法戦記リリカルなのはForce)	Main	Manga	2009-04-30	2013-06-29 (indefinite hiatus)	6	0081
Magical Girl Lyrical Nanoha ViVid (魔法少女リリカルなのはViVid)	Main	Manga	2009-05-26	2017-10-26	20	0079–80
Magical Girl Lyrical Nanoha MOVIE 1st THE COMICS (魔法少女リリカルなのはMOVIE 1st THE COMICS)	Standalone	Manga	2009-07-30	2010-12-27	2	0065
Magical Girl Lyrical Nanoha Force Dimension (魔法少女リリカルなのは Force Dimension)	Main	Manga	2010-03-30	indefinite hiatus	1	0065
Magical Girl Lyrical Nanoha ViVid Life (魔法少女リリカルなのはViVid LIFE)	Main	Manga	2011-04-10	2016-03-26	4	0079–80
Magical Girl Lyrical Nanoha Innocent (魔法少女リリカルなのは Innocent)	Brave Duel	Manga	2012-07-26	2014-03-25	3	-
Magical Girl Lyrical Nanoha Material Girls. Innocent (魔法少女リリカルなのはマテリアル娘。 Innocent)	Brave Duel	Manga	2013-03-26	2016-03-26	4	-
ORIGINAL CHRONICLE Magical Girl Lyrical Nanoha The 1st (ORIGINAL CHRONICLE 魔法少女リリカルなのは The 1st)	Movie	Manga	2013-11-30	2016-05-29	7	0063-65
Magical Girl Lyrical Nanoha Innocents (魔法少女リリカルなのは Innocents)	Brave Duel	Manga	2014-04-26	2016-01-26	3	-
Magical Girl Lyrical Nanoha Reflection THE COMICS (魔法少女リリカルなのは Reflection THE COMICS)	Movie	Manga	2017-12-26	2018-12-26	2	0067
Magical Girl Lyrical Nanoha Exceeds (魔法少女リリカルなのは EXCEEDS)	Movie	Manga	2025-04-16	TBA	TBA	0069

=== Video games ===
Two fighting games based on A's were released by Namco Bandai Games for PlayStation Portable in January 2010 and December 2011 respectively. Characters from the Nanoha franchise appear in the crossover role-playing game, Nendoroid Generation, which is based on the Nendoroid series of figures.

Title	Platforms	Developer	Publisher	Release date
Magical Girl Lyrical Nanoha A's Portable: The Battle of Aces	PSP	Witch Craft	Namco Bandai Games	2010-01-21
Magical Girl Lyrical Nanoha A's Portable: The Gears of Destiny	PSP	Witch Craft	Namco Bandai Games	2011-12-22
Nendoroid Generation	PSP	Banpresto	Namco-Bandai	2012-02-23

== Cultural impact ==
The franchise takes an innovative approach to the magical girl genre, focusing much more on combat whereas typical titles focus more on characterization, as well as being targeted at a male demographic. ICv2 praised the Nanoha franchise for taking a more serious approach to social issues such as child abuse than other magical girl anime.

John Oppliger, an analyst for AnimeNation, identified two ways in which the Lyrical Nanoha franchise deviates from the magical girl genre conventions: the tone and feel of the conflict and the presentation of its central heroine, Nanoha Takamachi. About the former, he observed that although another magical girl series, Futari wa Pretty Cure, preceded the first Lyrical Nanoha anime by six months in introducing an unprecedented amount of violence to the genre, the fights in Pretty Cure were still strongly tied to the emotional state and drama of their participants. Whereas in Nanoha, the battles are akin to "magical gunfights"; they appear objective, mechanical, and deadly and are inspired more by the science fiction and mecha genres than by the traditional magical girl conflicts. Regarding the latter, Oppliger described the show as trying to evoke sympathy for Nanoha Takamachi instead of empathy, i.e. Nanoha presents its heroine from an external point of view to make the audience feel for her but not want to be her or to be like her, as other magical girl series do. Such perspective is, according to Oppliger, "used for conventional otaku anime" and makes the anime more accessible to the older male demographic.
