= List of Magical Girl Lyrical Nanoha characters =

The following list introduces the characters of the Magical Girl Lyrical Nanoha in Main and Movie Timeline.

== Protagonists ==
=== Nanoha Series ===
Nanoha Takamachi, 9 years

Nanoha Takamachi (高町 なのは, Takamachi Nanoha)
Voiced by: Yukari Tamura (Japanese); Cristina "Vee" Valenzuela (English)
Nanoha is an ordinary nine year old girl that answered a call of help from an injured ferret.
Fate Testarossa (フェイト・テスタロッサ, Feito Tesutarossa)
Voiced by: Nana Mizuki (Japanese); Jennifer Alyx (English)
A mysterious blonde haired magical girl, that Nanoha encounters in her search for the Jewel Seeds, referred to by Nanoha as having "sad, lonely eyes". In the series, she surprises her by being another magical girl just like Nanoha. Her surname is derived from the Ferrari Testarossa.
Hayate Yagami (八神 はやて, Yagami Hayate)
Voiced by: Kana Ueda (Japanese); Shelby Lindley (English)
Hayate is an orphan who uses a wheelchair, who in the series is under the care of the Wolkenritter (German for Cloud-knights), though they kept their battles from her. She is aware that the completion of the Book of Darkness will grant her vast power, but does not want to obtain it at the expense of the lives of others.

=== Vivid Series ===
Vivio Takamachi (高町 ヴィヴィオ, Takamachi Vivio)
Voiced by: Kaori Mizuhashi
A main protagonist of Magical Girl Lyrical Nanoha ViVid. In Striker S, she was found with a relic and rescued by Caro and Erio. She and Nanoha became fond of each other. Later in the series Nanoha has taken her in and Fate helps take care of her. Named after the Subaru Vivio.
Einhart Stratos (アインハルト・ストラトス, Ainharuto Sutoratosu)
Voiced by: Mamiko Noto
A user of Kaiser Arts that had given herself the name of the previous Sankt Kaiser, Heidi E. S. Ingvalt (ハイデイ・E・S・イングヴアルト, Haidei E S Inguvaruto). She picked street fights in order to prove that Hegemon's strength is the greatest of all Belkan warriors. Like Vivio, she has heterochromia and possesses both a child form and an adult form. Her surname is derived from the Lancia Stratos.
Fuuka Reventon (フーカ・レヴェントン, Fūka Reventon)
Voiced by: Inori Minase
A main protagonist of ViVid Strike!. A childhood best friend of Rinne from the orphanage where the two of them grew up together. After she is apprenticed by Einhart, she becomes more calm and relaxed but still wants to get stronger so she can fight alongside Rinne. Nevertheless, Fuka is gracious towards her fighting skilled seniors despite some of them being a few years younger than her. Her surname is derived from the Lamborghini Reventon.
Rinne Berlinetta (リンネ・ベルリネッタ, Rinne Berurinetta)
Voiced by: Yui Ogura
A student at Bulgheroni Academy. She was adopted by the Berlinetta family after she was orphaned for unknown reasons; Rinne and her friend Fuka stayed at the same orphanage during their childhood, which is also the place where they spent the first years of their lives at.

=== Force Series ===
Thoma Avenir (トーマ・アヴェニール, Tōma Avenīru)
Voiced by: Yūki Kaji
A male protagonist of Magical Record Lyrical Nanoha Force. A freelance archaeologist from the planet Vaizen, who travels various places with his camera device, Steed. His surname is derived from the Nissan Avenir.
Lily-Strosek (リリィ・シュトロゼック, Ririi Shutorozekku)
Voiced by: Haruka Tomatsu
A female protagonist of Magical Record Lyrical Nanoha Force. A mysterious girl discovered by Thoma in a facility on the world of Ruwella.
