= Magical Girl Lyrical Nanoha ViVid =

Japanese manga series

- Magical Girl Lyrical Nanoha ViVid manga volume 1 cover

魔法少女リリカルなのはViVid (Mahō Shōjo Ririkaru Nanoha ViVid)
- Genre: Adventure, magical girl
- Created by: Masaki Tsuzuki
- Prequels
- Magical Girl Lyrical Nanoha (2004); Magical Girl Lyrical Nanoha A's (2005); Magical Girl Lyrical Nanoha StrikerS (2007)
- Manga
- Written by: Masaki Tsuzuki
- Illustrated by: Takuya Fujima
- Published by: Kadokawa Shoten
- Magazine: Comp Ace
- Original run: May 26, 2009 – October 26, 2017
- Volumes: 20
- Manga

Magical Girl Lyrical Nanoha ViVid Life
- Written by: Masaki Tsuzuki
- Illustrated by: Nekotōfu
- Published by: Kadokawa Shoten
- Magazine: Comptiq (2011-2013); Comp Ace (2013-2016)
- Original run: April 10, 2011 – March 26, 2016
- Volumes: 4
- Anime television series
- Directed by: Yūki Itō
- Produced by: Tatsuya Ishikawa; Akiko Ishioka
- Written by: Naruaki Kobayashi
- Music by: Misa Chūjō
- Studio: A-1 Pictures
- Original network: Tokyo MX, MBS, TVA, GYT, GTV, BS11, AT-X
- Original run: April 3, 2015 – June 19, 2015
- Episodes: 12
- Anime television series

ViVid Strike!
- Directed by: Junji Nishimura
- Produced by: Jun Fukuda; Tomohiro Arai; Hiromasa Kuroki; Kenichi Iguchi
- Written by: Masaki Tsuzuki
- Music by: Yoichiro Yoshikawa
- Studio: Seven Arcs Pictures
- Licensed by: NA: Discotek Media
- Original network: Tokyo MX, MBS, GTV, AT-X, BS11, GYT
- Original run: October 1, 2016 – December 17, 2016
- Episodes: 12 + 3 OVAs
- Sequel
- Magical Girl Lyrical Nanoha Exceeds Gun Blaze Vengeance (2026)
- icon

Magical Girl Lyrical Nanoha ViVid (魔法少女リリカルなのはViVid, Mahō Shōjo Ririkaru Nanoha Vividdo) is a Japanese manga series written by Masaki Tsuzuki and illustrated by Takuya Fujima. It is part of Magical Girl Lyrical Nanoha franchise, taking place four years after the events of Magical Girl Lyrical Nanoha StrikerS. The series began serialization in Kadokawa Shoten's Comp Ace on May 26, 2009. An anime television series adaptation produced by A-1 Pictures aired in Japan from April 3 to June 19, 2015. A spin-off original anime project by Seven Arcs Pictures, titled ViVid Strike!, aired between October and December 2016, featuring a new pair of protagonists.

== Plot ==
The series takes place four years after the events of Magical Girl Lyrical Nanoha StrikerS, during which magical girl Nanoha Takamachi rescued and adopted a young girl named Vivio, who is the clone of the Sankt Kaiser, Olivie Segbrecht. After entering her fourth year of elementary school, Vivio is given her own intelligence device, Sacred Heart, and gains the power to transform using her adult Sankt Kaiser mode. She soon comes across a girl named Einhart Stratos who, similar to Vivio, is the descendant of another Sankt Kaiser ruler, Claus G.S. Ingvalt. As Einhart becomes determined to prove her fighting style is the strongest, Vivio befriends her and, together with her friends, enters a martial arts tournament where they fight against various magical opponents and learn more about their past lives.

The spin-off series, ViVid Strike!, focuses on an orphaned girl named Fuuka Reventon who was defeated by her former friend, Rinne Berlinetta. Taken in by Einhart, Fuuka begins training to become stronger and win against Rinne, who has become a fierce and merciless fighter.

== Media ==
=== Manga ===
The manga, written by Masaki Tsuzuki and illustrated by Takuya Fujima, began serialization in Kadokawa Shoten's Comp Ace on May 26, 2009. and ended on October 26, 2017. It has been compiled into 20 tankōbon volumes. Kadokawa Shoten re-published the first six volumes of the manga in full color under the title Magical Girl Lyrical Nanoha ViVid Full Colors between April 24, 2012, and June 26, 2015. A four-panel comic strip gag manga titled Magical Girl Lyrical Nanoha ViVid Life, written by Masaki Tsuzuki and illustrated by Nekotōfu, began serialization in the May 2011 issue of Kadokawa Shoten's Comptiq magazine and later transferred to Comp Ace in April 2013. It was serialized there until the April 2016 issue. In total, four compiled volumes were published.

Magical Girl Lyrical Nanoha ViVid

No.	Release date	ISBN
1	January 22, 2010	978-4-04-715373-8
2	July 21, 2010	978-4-04-715484-1
3	March 8, 2011 (limited edition); March 19, 2011 (regular edition)	978-4-04-900806-7 (limited edition); 978-4-04-715659-3 (regular edition)
4	September 9, 2011 (limited edition); September 16, 2011 (regular edition)	978-4-04-900810-4 (limited edition); 978-4-04-715785-9 (regular edition)
5	October 22, 2011	978-4-04-715807-8
6	March 21, 2012	978-4-04-120184-8
7	June 22, 2012	978-4-04-120296-8
8	February 7, 2013 (limited edition); February 22, 2013 (regular edition)	978-4-04-120391-0 (limited edition); 978-4-04-120597-6 (regular edition)
9	April 23, 2013	978-4-04-120681-2
10	September 24, 2013	978-4-04-120885-4
11	March 10, 2014 (limited edition); March 26, 2014 (regular edition)	978-4-04-120934-9 (limited edition); 978-4-04-120933-2 (regular edition)
12	July 26, 2014	978-4-04-121137-3
13	January 10, 2015 (limited edition); January 26, 2015 (regular edition)	978-4-04-121139-7 (limited edition); 978-4-04-121138-0 (regular edition)
14	May 26, 2015	978-4-04-102468-3
15	December 10, 2015 (limited edition); December 26, 2015 (regular edition)	978-4-04-103342-5 (limited edition); 978-4-04-102469-0 (regular edition)
16	April 26, 2016	978-4-04-104258-8
17	October 26, 2016	978-4-04-104883-2
18	April 24, 2017	978-4-04-105535-9
19	July 24, 2017	978-4-04-106097-1
20	December 26, 2017	978-4-04-106486-3 (limited edition); 978-4-04-106098-8 (regular edition)

Magical Girl Lyrical Nanoha ViVid Full Colors

No.	Release date	ISBN
1	April 24, 2012	978-4-04-120220-3
2	May 24, 2012	978-4-04-120221-0
3	August 23, 2012	978-4-04-120255-5
4	October 24, 2012	978-4-04-120256-2
5	April 25, 2015	978-4-04-102799-8
6	June 26, 2015	978-4-04-102800-1

Magical Girl Lyrical Nanoha ViVid Life

No.	Title	Release date	ISBN
1	Magical Girl Lyrical Nanoha ViVid Life (魔法少女リリカルなのはViVid LIFE)	July 6, 2012	978-4-04-120344-6
2	Magical Girl Lyrical Nanoha ViVid Life Advance (魔法少女リリカルなのはViVid LIFE Advance)	April 23, 2013	978-4-04-120682-9
3	Magical Girl Lyrical Nanoha ViVid Life Intermiddle Chapter (魔法少女リリカルなのはViVid LIFE インターミドル編)	March 26, 2014	978-4-04-121069-7
4	Magical Girl Lyrical Nanoha ViVid LIFE Interval Chapter (魔法少女リリカルなのはViVid LIFE インターバル編)	March 26, 2016	978-4-04-103343-2

=== Anime ===
First Blu-ray Disc cover of ViVid Strike! featuring Fuuka Revention (left) and Einhart Stratos (right)

On August 15, 2014, an anime adaptation of Magical Girl Lyrical Nanoha ViVid was announced at Comiket 86 and aired from April 3 to June 19, 2015. The anime is produced by A-1 Pictures with direction by Yuuki Itoh, screenplays by Naruo Kobayashi, and character designs by Masaaki Yamano. The opening theme is "Angel Blossom" by Nana Mizuki and the ending theme is "Pleasure treasure" by Yukari Tamura.

A spin-off anime series, titled ViVid Strike!, aired 12 episodes from October 1 to December 17, 2016, on Tokyo MX and other television networks. The series is directed by Junji Nishimura and produced by Seven Arcs Pictures, with the screenplay written by Masaki Tsuzuki, character designs by Takuya Fujima and Mariko Itō, and music by Yoichiro Yoshikawa. The series is streamed on Amazon Video in the United Kingdom and North America. The opening theme is "Future Strike" by Yui Ogura and the ending theme is "Starry Wish" by Inori Minase.
