= BanG Dream! discography =

- BanG Dream! Girls Band Party! Cover Collection Vol. 4 cover, featuring the vocalists of the seven bands
- Studio albums: 15
- EPs: 9
- Soundtrack albums: 5
- Live albums: 10
- Compilation albums: 2
- Tribute albums: 7
- Singles: 96; 78 (main bands); 18 (other)

The Japanese media franchise BanG Dream!, created by Bushiroad in 2015, consists of eight bands whose members portray fictional characters in the anime series and mobile game BanG Dream! Girls Band Party!. The bands consist of Poppin'Party (founded in 2015), Roselia, Afterglow, Pastel Palettes, Hello, Happy World! (2016), Raise A Suilen (2018), Morfonica (2020), and MyGO!!!!! (2022). Ave Mujica, Mugendai Mewtype (2023), millsage, and Ikka Dumb Rock (2026) are the only four bands in the franchise that have not yet been tied to Girls Band Party!.

Each of the eight bands have released singles and albums, which feature songs that are playable in Girls Band Party!. While the singles and albums contain original songs, the franchise has also produced albums featuring cover versions of popular music performed by the groups. Other singles include image songs by Poppin'Party, those from non-major bands like Glitter Green, and products of collaborations.

The franchise's music is produced by Elements Garden. Kō Nakamura and Asuka Oda serve as the franchise's lyricists, with the former writing lyrics for most Poppin'Party songs while the latter does so for the other groups.

This list does not cover music released by the side project Argonavis from BanG Dream!, which became independent from the franchise in 2021 as from Argonavis.

== Albums ==
=== Studio albums ===
Year	Artist	Title	Release date	Peak Oricon chart position	Notes	Ref
2018	Roselia	Anfang	May 2	2	Bands' first albums	
2019	Poppin'Party	Poppin'on!	January 30	4	Bands' first albums	
2020	Poppin'Party	Breakthrough!	June 24	3	Bands' second albums	
2020	Roselia	Wahl	July 15	3	Bands' second albums	
2020	Raise A Suilen	Era (Note: Officially stylized in all caps.)	August 19	2	Bands' first albums	
2021	Afterglow	One of Us	March 24	8	Bands' first albums	
2021	Pastel Palettes	Title Idol	May 19	5	Bands' first albums	
2021	Hello, Happy World!	Smile Connection! (にこにこねくと！, Nikoniko ne kuto!)	July 14	9	Bands' first albums	
2022	Various artists	BanG Dream! Dreamer's Best	March 16	6	Compilation album of songs selected by fan vote	
2023	Morfonica	Quintet	March 15	9	Morfonica's first album	
2023	Afterglow	Stay Glow	April 26	12	Bands' second albums	
2023	Pastel Palettes	Pastel à la Mode	May 31	16	Bands' second albums	
2023	Hello, Happy World!	Smile on Parade	June 28	14	Bands' second albums	
2023	MyGO!!!!!	Meisekiha (迷跡波)	November 1	5	MyGO!!!!!'s first album	
2024	Raise A Suilen	Savage	June 12	10	Raise A Suilen's second album	
2024	Roselia	Für Immer	June 26	5	Roselia's third album	
2024	MyGO!!!!!	Michinoku (跡暖空)	December 28	3	MyGO!!!!!'s second album	
2025	Poppin'Party	Popigenic	February 26	15	Poppin'Party's third album	
2025	Morfonica	Polyphony	March 12	21	Morfonica's second album	
2025	Ave Mujica	Completeness	April 23	7	Bands' first albums	
2025	Mugendai Mewtype	Progress Sign (プログレス サイン, Puroguresu Sain)	December 24	24	Bands' first albums	
2026	Ave Mujica	Ave Música	June 16	4	Compilation album featuring a selection of the band's songs	
2026	MyGO!!!!!	Chiheisen (致並跡)	July 15	TBA	Bands' third album	

=== Cover albums ===
Year	Title	Release date	Peak Oricon chart position	Notes	Ref
2018	BanG Dream! Girls Band Party! Cover Collection Vol. 1 (バンドリ！ ガールズバンドパーティ！ カバーコレクション Vol.1)	June 27	6	Original five bands featured	
2019	BanG Dream! Girls Band Party! Cover Collection Vol. 2 (バンドリ！ ガールズバンドパーティ！ カバーコレクション Vol.2)	March 13	6	Original five bands featured	
2019	BanG Dream! Girls Band Party! Cover Collection Vol. 3 (バンドリ！ ガールズバンドパーティ！ カバーコレクション Vol.3)	December 18	4	Raise A Suilen's first Cover Collection appearance	
2020	BanG Dream! Girls Band Party! Cover Collection Vol. 4 (バンドリ！ ガールズバンドパーティ！ カバーコレクション Vol.4)	May 27	1	Morfonica's first Cover Collection appearance	
2020	BanG Dream! Girls Band Party! Cover Collection Special Selection (バンドリ！ ガールズバンドパーティ！カバコレ Special Selection)	June 1	—	Contains five popular covers from each original band	
2020	Garupa Vocaloid Cover Collection (ガルパ ボカロカバーコレクション)	December 16	4		
2021	BanG Dream! Girls Band Party! Cover Collection Vol. 5 (バンドリ！ ガールズバンドパーティ！ カバーコレクションVol.5)	February 24	6		
2021	BanG Dream! Girls Band Party! Cover Collection Vol. 6 (バンドリ！ ガールズバンドパーティ！ カバーコレクションVol.6)	November 10	4		
2022	BanG Dream! Girls Band Party! Cover Collection Vol. 7 (バンドリ！ ガールズバンドパーティ！ カバーコレクションVol.7)	December 14	13		
2023	BanG Dream! Girls Band Party! Cover Collection Vol. 8 (バンドリ！ ガールズバンドパーティ！ カバーコレクションVol.8)	September 6	21		
2024	BanG Dream! Girls Band Party! Cover Collection Vol. 9 (バンドリ！ ガールズバンドパーティ！ カバーコレクションVol.9)	October 30	13		
2025	BanG Dream! Girls Band Party! Cover Collection Vol. 10 (バンドリ！ ガールズバンドパーティ！ カバーコレクションVol.10)	October 15	19		

=== Live albums ===
Year	Artist	Title	Release date	Peak Oricon chart position	Ref
2018	Poppin'Party	Poppin'Party 2015–2017 Live Best	May 30	9	
2018	The Third (Beta) (Note: Temporary name of Raise A Suilen.)	"The Third (Beta) 1st Live" (The Third（仮）1st ライブ)	September 26	17	
2019	Roselia	Roselia 2017–2018 Live Best -Soweit-	November 6	6	
2019	Poppin'Party; Roselia; Raise A Suilen; Hello, Happy World!	BanG Dream! 6th☆LIVE	November 27	10	
2020	Poppin'Party; Roselia; Afterglow; Pastel Palettes; Hello, Happy World! Raise A Suilen; Glitter Green	Tokyo MX presents 「BanG Dream! 7th☆Live」Complete Box	February 19	3	
2020	Roselia	TOKYO MX presents「BanG Dream! 7th☆Live」 Day 1：Roselia「Hitze」	February 19	6	
2020	Raise A Suilen	Tokyo MX presents「BanG Dream! 7th☆Live」 Day 2：Raise a Suilen「Genesis」	February 19	13	
2020	Poppin'Party	TOKYO MX presents「BanG Dream! 7th☆LIVE」 DAY3：Poppin'Party「Jumpin' Music♪」	February 19	14	
2020	Roselia x Raise A Suilen	Roselia x Raise A Suilen "Rausch und/and Craziness"	November 18	3	
2021	Poppin'Party x Silent Siren; Roselia; Raise A Suilen	Poppin'Party x Silent Siren vs Live "No Girl No Cry" at MetLife Dome	April 28	17	
2022	Poppin'Party; Roselia; Raise A Suilen; Morfonica	BanG Dream! 9th☆Live Complete Box	June 22		
2022	Pastel Palettes	Pastel＊Palettes Special Live 「Title Dream」	August 3		

=== Anime albums ===
Year	Title	Release date	Peak Oricon chart position	Ref
2017	BanG Dream! Original Soundtrack	April 26	20	
2019	"BanG Dream! Film Live" Insert Song Collection (「BanG Dream! Film Live」劇中歌コレクション)	September 25	16	
2020	BanG Dream! 2nd & 3rd Season Original Soundtrack (アニメ「BanG Dream! 2nd＆3rd Season」オリジナル・サウンドトラック)	April 8	9	
2021	"BanG Dream! Episode of Roselia" Theme Songs Collection	June 30	3	
2021	"BanG Dream! Film Live 2nd Stage" Special Songs	August 25	13	

== Extended plays (EPs) ==
Year	Artist	Title	Release date	Peak Oricon chart position	Notes	Ref
2021	Poppin'Party	Live Beyond!!	August 18	10	Poppin'Party's first mini-album	
2022	Roselia	Rozen Horizon	May 18	6	Roselia's first mini-album. Two versions were released with different cover songs and cover artwork.	
2023	Poppin'Party	Youth To Be Continued (青春 To Be Continued, Seishun To Be Continued)	May 31	9	Poppin'Party's second mini-album	
2023	Ave Mujica	Alea Jacta Est	September 13	14	Bands' first mini albums	
2023	Raise A Suilen	Revelation	November 1	8	Bands' first mini albums	
2023	Morfonica	Forte (Note: Officially stylized in lower-case.)	December 6	14	Bands' first mini albums	
2024	Afterglow	Unforgettable Days (忘れらんない日々のこと, Wasurerannai Hibi no Koto)	April 3	18	Bands' first mini albums	
2024	Pastel*Palettes	Multicolored (いろとりどり, Irotoridori)	May 29	15	Bands' first mini albums	
2024	Hello, Happy World!	Carnival No Matter What! (どうしたってカーニバル!, Doushitatte Carnival!)	June 19	29	Bands' first mini albums	
2024	Ave Mujica	ELEMENTS	October 2	5	Bands' second mini albums	
2025	Afterglow	Glow Goes On	July 2	27	Bands' second mini albums	
2025	Pastel*Palettes	Stage by Stage with You (きみと Stage by Stage, Kimi to Stage by Stage)	August 13	14	Bands' second mini albums	
2025	Hello, Happy World!	It's Smile World!! (いっつあ！すまいるわーるど！！, Ittsu a! Su mairu wa ̄rudo! !)	September 24	45	Bands' second mini albums	

== Singles ==
=== Band singles ===
==== Poppin'Party ====
Year	Title (Note: English titles are from the English-language franchise website.)	Release date	Peak Oricon chart position	Notes	Ref
2016	"Yes! BanG_Dream!"	February 24	52		
2016	"Star Beat!" (Star Beat!〜ホシノコドウ〜, Star Beat! ~Hoshi no Kodou~)	August 3	27		
2016	"On Your New Journey / Tear Drops" (走り始めたばかりのキミに／ティアドロップス, Hashiri Hajimeta Bakari no Kimi ni / Tiadoroppusu)	December 7	10		
2017	"Exciting Experience!" (ときめきエクスペリエンス, Tokimeki Ekusuperiensu)	February 1	12	Anime first season opening theme music	
2017	"Sparkling Dreaming: Sing Girls" (キラキラだとか夢だとか ～Sing Girls～, Kirakira da toka Yume da toka ~Sing Girls~)	February 15	11	Anime first season ending theme	
2017	"Keep On Moving! / Sunflower Dreams" (前へススメ！／夢みるSunflower, Mae e Susume! / Yumemiru Sunflower)	May 10	12		
2017	"Time Lapse"	September 20	6		
2017	"Our Christmas Song" (クリスマスのうた, Kurisumasu no Uta)	December 13	16		
2018	"CiRCLING"	March 21	7		
2018	"Double Rainbow/Excellent (Hey, Let's Go!)" (二重の虹（ダブル レインボウ）/最高(さあ行こう)！, Nijū no Niji (Daburu Reinbō)/Saa Ikō (Sā Ikou)!)	July 11	4		
2018	"Girl's Code" (ガールズコード, Gāruzu Kōdo)	October 3	5		
2018	"Bonding Music♪" (キズナミュージック♪, Kizuna Myujikku♪)	December 12	4	BanG Dream! 2nd Season opening theme	
2019	"Jumpin'"	February 20	6	BanG Dream! 2nd Season ending theme	
2019	"Dreamers Go! / Returns"	May 15	4		
2020	"Initial / Straight Through Our Dreams!" (イニシャル/夢を撃ち抜く瞬間に！, Inishiaru / Yume o Uchinuku Shunkan ni!)	January 8	1	BanG Dream! 3rd Season theme music. Released in Kirakira and Dokidoki versions with different coupling tracks	
2021	"Photograph"	January 6	1		
2022	"Poppin'Dream!" (ぽっぴん'どりーむ！, Poppin' Dorīmu!)	January 5	4	BanG Dream! Poppin'Dream! theme music	
2022	"Shut Away in Summer" (夏に閉じこめて, Natsu ni Tojikomete)	August 31	27		
2024	"In a New Season" (新しい季節に, Atarashii Kisetsu ni)	January 24	16		
2024	"Tarinai / Tremolo Eyes" (Tarinai /トレモロアイズ, Tarinai / Toremoro Aizu)	July 17	13		
2025	"Drive Your Heart"	December 24	4		
2026	"Heart-Fluttering Date"	April 29	TBA		

==== Roselia ====
Year	Title	Release date	Peak Oricon chart position	Notes	Ref
2017	"Black Shout"	April 19	7		
2017	"Re:birth day"	June 28	9		
2017	"Passionate Starmine" (熱色スターマイン, Nesshoku Sutāmain)	August 30	7		
2017	"Oneness"	November 29	8		
2018	"Opera of the wasteland"	March 21	5		
2018	"R"	July 25	3		
2018	"Brave Jewel" (Note: Used as theme music in the anime.)	December 12	3	BanG Dream! 2nd Season opening theme	
2019	"Safe and Sound"	February 20	3	BanG Dream! 2nd Season ending theme	
2019	"Fire Bird"	July 24	5		
2020	"Promise" (約束, Yakusoku)	January 15	5		
2021	"Zeal of Proud"	January 20	2	Cardfight!! Vanguard overDress opening theme	
2022	"Swear ～Night & Day～"	October 26	4		
2023	"Throne of Rose"	April 26	4		
2023	"Violet Line"	December 13	6		
2024	"Flower Crown as a Cornerstone" (礎の花冠, Ishizue no Hanakanmuri)	December 11	5		
2025	"Dazzle the Destiny"	June 26	6		
2025	"Requiem for Fate"	June 26	5		
2025	"Steadfast Spirits"	November 19	4		
2026	"Fear Nothing"	April 29	TBA		

==== Afterglow ====
Year	Title	Release date	Peak Oricon chart position	Notes	Ref
2017	"That Is How I Roll!"	September 6	18		
2018	"Hey-day Rhapsody(Capriccio)" (Hey-day狂騒曲(カプリチオ), Hey - day Kyōsōkyoku(Kapurichio))	January 30	7		
2018	"Tied to the Skies" (ツナグ、ソラモヨウ, Tsunagu, Sora Moyou)	October 31	8		
2019	"Y.O.L.O!!!!!"	February 20	8		
2019	"On Your Mark"	October 23	6		
2020	"Easy come, Easy go!"	March 11	7		
2020	"Sasanqua"	October 28	7		

==== Pastel Palettes ====
Year	Title	Release date	Peak Oricon chart position	Notes	Ref
2017	"Bubbling☆Dreaming" (しゅわりん☆どり～みん, Shuwarin☆Dorīmin)	July 12	4		
2018	"Swaying Ring-Dong-Dance" (ゆら・ゆらRing-Dong-Dance, Yura Yura Ring-Dong-Dance)	January 17	7		
2018	"Luminous Once More" (もういちど ルミナス~, Mou Ichido Ruminasu)	August 8	11		
2019	"Unite! From A To Z" (天下卜ーイツA to Z☆, Tenka Toitsu A to Z☆)	February 20	7		
2019	"Kyu-Mai Flower" (きゅ～まい＊flower)	September 18	6		
2020	"Pep Meets Step" (ワクワクmeetsトリップ, Wakuwaku meets Torippu)	March 4	12		
2020	"Dream Gradation" (ゆめゆめグラデーション, Yume Yume Guradēshon)	September 30	13		

==== Hello, Happy World! ====
Year	Title	Release date	Peak Oricon chart position	Notes	Ref
2017	"Orchestra of Smiles!" (えがおのオーケストラっ！, Egao no Ōkesutora!)	August 2	9		
2018	"Goka! Gokai!? Phantom Thief!" (ゴーカ！ごーかい！？ファントムシーフ！)	February 14	12		
2018	"I need you!" (キミがいなくちゃっ！, Kimi ga Inakucha!)	December 5	8		
2019	"High Five Adventure" (ハイファイブ∞あどべんちゃっ)	February 20	9		
2019	"Smiling & Singing A Song" (えがお･シング･あ･ソング, Egao Sing A Song)	August 21	10		
2020	"Smile x Smile = Hyper Smile Power!" (にこ×にこ=ハイパースマイルパワー！, Niko Niko Hyper Smile Power!)	March 18	8		
2020	"We Can Hurray!" (うぃーきゃん☆フレフレっ！)	November 25	15		

==== Raise A Suilen ====
Year	Title	Release date	Peak Oricon chart position	Notes	Ref
2018	"R・I・O・T"	December 12	6		
2019	"A Declaration of ×××"	February 20	10		
2019	"Invincible Fighter"	June 19	7	Cardfight!! Vanguard: High School Arc Cont. theme music	
2020	"Drive Us Crazy"	January 22	5		
2020	"Sacred world"	October 21	6	Assault Lily Bouquet theme music	
2021	"mind of Prominence"	January 27	3		
2021	"Exist"	April 21	4	Joran: The Princess of Snow and Blood theme music	
2021	"Domination to world"	September 29	9		
2022	"Coruscate -DNA-"	April 27	7	Released in A and B versions with different coupling cover tracks	
2022	"The Way of Life"	November 30	10		
2023	"-N-e-m-e-s-i-s-"	June 28	13		
2025	"Bad Kids All Bet"	January 8	8		
2025	"Howling Ambition"	June 11	11		
2025	"Fight Addict" (Note: Stylized as 'Fight' Addict)	November 12	11		
2026	"What An Explosion"	June 10	TBA		

==== Morfonica ====
Year	Title	Release date	Peak Oricon chart position	Notes	Ref
2020	"Daylight" (Daylight -デイライト- 」, Deiraito)	May 27	2		
2021	"Bloom Bloom (ブルームブルーム, Burūmu Burūmu)	January 13	6		
2021	"Harmony Day" (ハーモニー・デイ, Hāmonī Dei)	October 6	8		
2022	"Fly with the Night"	March 30	7		
2022	"Sunny, Sunny by the side" (寄る辺のSunny, Sunny, Yorube no Sunny, Sunny)	September 14	23		
2024	"Brilliance of Wings" (両翼のBrilliance, Ryouyoku no Brilliance)	May 1	14		
2024	"Tempest/Wreath of Brave"	October 9	16		
2025	"Feathered Dreams"	August 27	12		
2026	"Resonant Strings"	April 22	13		

==== MyGO!!!!! ====
Year	Title	Release date	Peak Oricon chart position	Notes	Ref
2022	"Lost Stars Cry" (迷星叫, Mayoiuta)	November 9	43		
2023	"A Momentary Sound" (音一会, Otoichie)	April 12	19		
2023	"One Droplet" (壱雫空, Hitoshizuku)	August 9	12	BanG Dream! It's MyGO!!!!! opening theme	
2024	"Wanderer / Reminiscence" (砂寸奏 / 回層浮, Sasurai / Kaisou)	March 20	10		
2024	"Panorama" (端程山)	July 24	13		
2025	"A Moment Like an Eternity" (聿日箋秋, Ichijitsusenshu)	April 23	4		
2025	"Past-Marked Pillar" (往欄印, Ourai)	August 6	5		
2025	"Descending Thoughts of Calm" (静降想, Silent)	December 3	7		

==== Ave Mujica ====
Year	Title	Release date	Peak Oricon chart position	Notes	Ref
2024	"Utopia" (素晴らしき世界 でも どこにもない場所, Subarashiki Sekai demo Dokonimonai Basho)	April 24	13		
2025	"Killkiss" (Note: Stylized as KiLLKiSS)	January 15	4	Opening theme for BanG Dream! Ave Mujica	
2025	"S The Way / Sophie" (Note: The first song is stylized as 'S/' The Way)	December 10	4		

==== Mugendai Mewtype ====
Year	Title	Release date	Peak Oricon chart position	Notes	Ref
2024	"Commu-Ignition Fire!" (コミュ着火Fire!, Komyu Chakka Fire!)	December 25	7		
2025	"Hi-Vision"	April 30	12		
2025	"Midnight Amusement Park" (真夜中遊園地, Mayonaka Yuenchi)	September 3	10		
2026	"Journey to Superplanet X" (超惑星Xへの旅, Chō wakusei X e no tabi)	May 13	6		
2026	"This is the synopsis of our survival." (これはぼくたちの生存のあらすじ, Kore wa boku-tachi no seizon no arasuji)	September 30	TBA		

==== Millsage ====
Year	Title	Release date	Peak Oricon chart position	Notes	Ref
2026	"Ring of Sound" (鳴らす, Narasu)	September 30	TBA		

=== Other singles ===
Year	Artist	Title	Release date	Peak Oricon chart position	Notes	Ref
2017	Aimi	"Doki Doki Sing Out!" (どきどきSING OUT!)	April 5	22	Kasumi Toyama character song	
2017	Sae Ōtsuka	"Hanazono Electric Guitar!!!" (花園電気ギター！！！, Hanazono Denki Guitar!!!)	June 21	18	Tae Hanazono character song	
2017	Rimi Nishimoto	"Chocolate Bass Recipe" (チョコレイトの低音レシピ, Chocolate no Teion Recipe)	June 21	20	Rimi Ushigome character song	
2017	Ayaka Ōhashi	"A Distant Heartbeat" (遠い音楽 ～ハートビート～, Tooi Ongaku ~Heartbeat~)	July 26	22	Sāya Yamabuki character song	
2017	Ayasa Itō	"I, I Never Said Love!" (す、好きなんかじゃない！, Su, Suki Nanka Janai!)	July 26	21	Arisa Ichigaya character song	
2018	Kasumi, Yukina, Ran, Aya, Kokoro	"Quintuple Smile"	April 16	—	Digital singles	
2018	Poppin'Party	"Choco Cornet Love" (私の心はチョココロネ, Watashi no Kokoro wa Choco Cornet)	April 23	—	Digital singles	
2018	Kasumi, Yukina, Ran, Aya, Kokoro	"Pico! Papi! Girls Band Party PICO!!!" (ピコっと！パピっと！！ガルパ☆ピコ！！！, Pikotto! Papitto! Garupa☆Piko!!!)	August 22	15	BanG Dream! Girls Band Party! Pico theme song	
2018	High School Part Time Workers (Note: Consists of Aya Maruyama (Pastel Palettes), Kanon Matsubara (Hello, Happy World!), Tsugumi Hazawa and Moca Aoba (Afterglow), and Lisa Imai (Roselia).)	"You're Not Alone" (ひとりじゃないんだから, Hitori Janain Dakara)	September 24	—	Winner of Girls Band Party!'s second band election	
2018	Glitter Green	"Don't be afraid!"	November 21	11	Glitter Green's first and only single	
2019	Poppin'Party	"White Afternoon"	December 9	—	Digital single; theme song for Kirin Company's Gogo no Kōcha collaboration CM	
2020	Kasumi, Yukina, Ran, Aya, Kokoro	"One Extra Large! Garupa Pico" (大盛り一丁！ガルパ☆ピコ, Ohmori Iccho! Garupa☆Pico)	August 12	13	BanG Dream! Girls Band Party! Pico: Ohmori theme song	
2021	Kasumi, Yukina, Ran, Aya, Kokoro, Layer	"Picotarumono Fever!" (ピコたるもの、ふぃーばー！, Pikotaru Mono, Fuibā!)	October 8	—	BanG Dream! Girls Band Party! Pico Fever! theme song; digital release	
2022	Afterglow	"Kanayume" (カナユメ)	June 24	—	Digital singles	
2022	Pastel Palettes	"Boppin' Identity!" (るんっ♪てぃてぃー！, Run'♪tteitei~!)	June 24	—	Digital singles	
2022	Hello, Happy World!	"Kira☆tto Kimifes!" (きらっ☆と キミフェス！)	June 24	—	Digital singles	
2023	Ave Mujica	"Black Birthday" (黒のバースデイ, Kuro no Bāsudei)	April 11	—	Digital singles	

== Collaborations ==
Year	Artist	Collaborating artist	Title	Release date	Peak Oricon chart position	Notes	Ref
2019	Poppin'Party	Silent Siren	"No Girl No Cry"	July 31	18	Theme song for Poppin'Party and Silent Siren's joint concert of the same name. A Poppin'Party-only version was released on the Breakthrough! album.	
2020	Aimi	Silent Siren	"Up To You"	September 2	9	Part of the Silent Siren album mix10th.	
2021	Afterglow	Flow	"Winner" (優勝, Yūshō)	December 15	22	Part of the Flow single Dice. It was playable in Girls Band Party! for a limited time.	
2022	Aya Maruyama	ClariS	"Luminous Once More" (もういちど ルミナス~, Mou Ichido Luminous)	April 6	8	Cover of Pastel Palettes original song and released as part of the ClariS album Parfaitone. It was playable in Girls Band Party! for a limited time.	

=== Tie-up songs ===
"Tie-up" songs are original songs composed by outside artists and performed by the BanG Dream! groups. Such partnerships also include an accompanying music video and the bands performing a cover of their collaborator's own music. The series began in 2021.

Year	Band	Collaborating artist	Title	Notes	Ref
2021	Poppin'Party	Ayase (Yoasobi)	"Introduction" (イントロダクション)	Released in Girls Band Party! in 2021 before being included in "Poppin'Dream!" single.	
2022	Roselia	Eve	"Flashlight" (閃光, Senkō)	Included in Rozen Horizon.	
2022	Raise A Suilen	Fear, and Loathing in Las Vegas	"Repaint"	Released digitally on February 26. Included on the "Coruscate -DNA-" single.	
2022	Pastel Palettes	Zaq	"Brand new Pastel Road!"		
2022	Hello, Happy World!	Hyadain	"Happy! Happier! Happiest!"		
2022	Morfonica	Jun'ichi Satō (Fhána)	"The Circle of Butterflies"		
2022	Afterglow	TK (Ling Tosite Sigure)	"Original Aberration" (独創収差, Dokusōshūsa)		

=== Extra songs ===
"Extra" songs are collaborations between BanG Dream! and outside artists in which both perform a duet cover of the latter's own music. Like with tie-up songs, extras began in 2021, have music videos, and are playable in Girls Band Party!.

Year	Band	Collaborating artist	Title	Notes	Ref
2021	Poppin'Party	Konomi Suzuki	"Days of Dash"		
2021	Poppin'Party	Tokino Sora	"Tracing That Dream" (あの夢をなぞって, Ano Yume o Nazotte)	Originally performed by Yoasobi. Released in Girls Band Party! as part of the collaboration event with Hololive.	
2021	Afterglow	Flow	"Colors"		
2021	Pastel Palettes	Minato Aqua	"Fansa" (ファンサ)	Originally performed by Shiina Natsukawa. Released in Girls Band Party! in 2021 as part of the collaboration event with Hololive.	
2021	Pastel Palettes	ClariS	"Soliloquy" (ヒトリゴト, Hitorigoto)		
2021	Hello, Happy World!	Machico	"Tomorrow"		
2021	Hello, Happy World!	Shirakami Fubuki	"Bon Appétit♡S" (ぼなぺてぃーと♡S)	Originally performed by Blend A. Released in Girls Band Party! in 2021 as part of the collaboration with Hololive.	
2022	Morfonica	Fhána	"Rhapsody of Blue Sky" (青空のラプソディ, Aozora no Rhapsody)		
2022	Roselia	Kanako Itō	"Skyclad Observer" (スカイクラッドの観測者, Sukaikuraddo no Kansokusha)		
2022	Raise A Suilen	Myth & Roid	"Voracity"		
