= Killkiss =

2025 single by Ave Mujica

- Digital and standard edition cover

Single by Ave Mujica

from the album Completeness
- Language: Japanese
- B-side: "Georgette Me, Georgette You"
- Released: January 15, 2025
- Studio: Studio Mech, Sound City, Tokyo
- Genre: Symphonic metal; anime song
- Length: 3:28
- Label: Bushiroad Music
- Songwriters: Daisuke Hasegawa, Diggy-MO'
- Producer: Hiroki Matsumoto

Ave Mujica singles chronology
"Ether" (2024)	"Killkiss" (2025)	"Georgette Me, Georgette You" (2025)

"Killkiss" (stylized as "KiLLKiSS") is a song by Japanese metal band Ave Mujica. It was released digitally on January 8, 2025, while the CD single was released on January 15, 2025, via Bushiroad Music, serving as the opening theme for the anime series BanG Dream! Ave Mujica. "Killkiss" was written by Daisuke Hasegawa and Diggy-MO', while the latter also wrote the song's lyrics.

"Killkiss" managed to chart in the official Japanese Singles Charts published by Oricon as well as on the Japan Hot 100, published by Billboard Japan. "Killkiss" was also longlisted for a nomination at the inaugural Music Awards Japan.

== Background and release ==
The release of "Killkiss" was announced on October 18, 2024. The announcement stated that the title-giving song would serve as the opening theme song for the then upcoming anime series BanG Dream! Ave Mujica, which started airing on Japanese television on January 2, 2025. A week prior to the physical release, the song was made public for streaming on January 8, 2025.

The CD single was officially released in Japan on January 15, 2025, and contains four tracks, including "Killkiss" and its B-side "Georgette Me, Georgette You", with instrumental versions of both songs.

The single was released in two version: Standard Edition and Limited Edition. The limited edition features a Blu-ray disc containing the band's whole concert "Veritas". The first-press edition of both versions contained one out of five trading cards showing one of Ave Mujica's fictional band members.

== Writing and composition ==
"Killkiss" was composed by Diggy-MO', a former member of Japanese hip-hop group Soul'd Out, in co-operation with Aqua Timez guitarist Daisuke Hasegawa, while the lyrics were written by Diggy-MO' alone. According to Musicstax, "Killkiss" is written in the key of E minor and has a tempo of 100 beats per minute. Producer Hiroki Matsumoto described "Killkiss" as a fast song with a killer riffing and a magnificent orchestral part.

"Killkiss" was produced by Hiroki Matsumoto at Mech Studio, Sound City in Tokyo. Koichi Hara mixed the song at Fennel Studio in Shibuya, Tokyo while it was mastered by Hiromichi "Tucky" Takiguchi at his own studio, Tucky's Mastering. The vocals arrangements were handled by Diggy-MO'; Daisuke Hasegawa was responsible for the instrumental arrangements except for the string arrangements which were done by Takuma Sogi.

In an interview with Yota Tokuta for Real Sound, vocalist/lead guitarist Rico Sasaki spoke about the recording sessions. She told that she had to change her schedules on the first day of recording vocals. Sasaki also revealed that she felt nervousness and had to fight with throat problems.

== Reception ==
Lesley Aeschliman described "Killkiss" as an upbeat J-pop song that leans more into J-rock territory featuring an almost gothic sounding intro. Aeshliman wrote that the arrangement for the song is quite catchy and is said to be definitively grabbing a viewer's interest when they hear this in the opening theme of the anime. She concluded that fans of the BanG Dream! franchise will likely have the strongest appreciation for the song but it also could appeal to J-pop fans who like a hard sound to the genre.

Writing for Anime Trending, Agnes Nguyen wrote in her review for the first three episodes of the anime series, that the opening sequence "features eye-catching visuals that can't be written off as casual or unintentional for the project". She further wrote that the opening sequence would recall memories to the infamous Bad Apple!! video due to showcasing character silhouettes. Regarding the song itself, Nguyen stated that it managed to hit all her nostalgic musical preferences which she called-out being grunge, "depressing emo music" and contemporary rock music from the early 2000s.

== Commercial performance ==
In the first week after the physical release, "Killkiss" managed to sell slightly more than 27.000 copies in Japan, resulting the single debuting at no. 4 on the official Singles Charts published by Oricon.

== In popular culture ==
"Killkiss" was used as the opening theme song for the first season of the music anime television series BanG Dream! Ave Mujica while its B-side, "Georgette Me, Georgette You", served as the ending theme song for the same series. In the first episode of the anime series titled Sub rosa, the song was used in its entirely. The corresponding scene was later uploaded on YouTube as an official anime music video. The day after the anime series' premiere, a performance video for the song was officially released on YouTube.

"Killkiss" is a playable song on the mobile rhythm game BanG Dream! Girls Band Party!. Several beatmaps for the song were created in the rhythm game osu!. "Killkiss" also became a game card in the trading card game Cardfight!! Vanguard OverDress (Card no. DZ-BT08).

== Accolades ==
"Killkiss" was longlisted for a nomination in the categories Best Japanese Song and Best Anime Song at the inaugural Music Awards Japan but received no official nomination. The next year, the song won the Reiwa Anisong Awards for Best Anime Song.

== Track listing ==
All lyrics are written by Diggy-MO'.

Killkiss CD Single track listing
No.	Title	Music	Arrangement	Length
1.	"Killkiss"	Diggy-MO'; Daisuke Hasegawa	Daisuke Hasegawa	3:28
2.	"Georgette Me, Georgette You"	Diggy-MO'; Koji Matsuzaka	Koji Matsuzaka	3:54
3.	"Killkiss" (Instrumental)	Diggy-MO'; Daisuke Hasegawa	Daisuke Hasegawa	3:28
4.	"Georgette Me, Georgette You" (Instrumental)	Diggy-MO'; Koji Matsuzaka	Koji Matsuzaka	3:54
Total length:				14:44

== Credits and personnel ==
Credits adapted from the single liner notes.

Ave Mujica

- Rico Sasaki (Uika "Doloris" Misumi) – vocals, lead guitar
- Yuzuki Watase (Mutsuki "Mortis" Wakaba) – rhythm guitar
- Mei Okada (Umiri "Timoris" Yahata) – bass guitar
- Kanon Takao (Sakiko "Oblivionis" Togawa) – keyboards
- Akane Yonezawa (Nyamu "Amoris" Yūtenji) – drums

Additional musicians

- Hiroki Matsumoto – producer, director (Blu-ray)
- Daisuke Hasegawa – guitar arrangement (track 1 and 3)
- Takuma Sogi – string arrangement
- Ryūhei Kinoshita – bass arrangement
- Kenzo Ueki – drum arrangement
- Daisuke Kadowaki – first violin
- Kano Tajima – first violin
- Daisuke Yamamoto – second violin
- Makiko Tomokiyo – second violin
- Yuko Kajitani – viola
- Hikari Takahashi – Bratsche
- Toshiyuki Muranaka – cello
- Yu Miyao – cello
- Atsushi Kuramochi – contra bass
- Eri Handa – package design coordination
- Shunsaku Hirai – technical supervisor
- Hikki Komori – illustrations

Technical

- Kochi Hara – mixing engineer
- Hiromichi "Tucky" Takiguchi – mastering engineer

=== Locations ===
Recording

- Studio Mech, Sound City

Mixing

- Fennel Studio

Mastering

- Tucky's Mastering

Packaging

- Rokushiki Co., Ltd.

== Charts ==
Chart (2025)	Peak position
Japanese Singles (Oricon)	4
Japanese Combined Singles (Oricon)	9
Japan Anime Singles (Oricon)	1
Japanese Rock Singles (Oricon)	1
Digital Song Charts (Oricon)	27
Hot 100 (Billboard Japan)	26
Hot Animation (Billboard Japan)	4
Download Songs (Billboard Japan)	35
Top Singles Sales (Billboard Japan)	4
