= May (given name) =

- Gender: Female

Origin
- Origin: American/Latin American
- Meaning: the month of May, flower

Other names
- Related names: Maya, Maia, Mai

May is an English feminine given name. It is derived from the name of the month, which comes from Maia, the name of a Roman fertility goddess.

It can also be a variant of the Arabic name Mai مي, which either means water or little gazelle.

== People ==
=== Women ===
- Mary of Teck (1867–1953), queen consort of George V, King of the United Kingdom. She was informally referred to as "May".
- May Allison (1890–1989), American actress
- May Allison (runner) (born 1964), Canadian runner
- May Arida (1926–2018), Lebanese socialite
- May Arslan (1928–2013), member of the Lebanese Arslan family
- May Britt (1934–2025), Swedish actress
- May Bukhari (born 1999), British social media influencer
- May Chidiac (born 1964), Lebanese journalist and politician
- May Chow, Canadian chef
- Beryl May Dent (1900–1977), English mathematical physicist
- May Elghety (born 1998), Egyptian actress
- May Gibbs (1877–1969), Australian children's author and illustrator
- May Golan (born 1986), Israeli politician, political activist and commentator
- May Hezlet (1882–1978), British amateur golfer and sports writer
- May Hollinworth (1895–1968), Australian theatre producer and director
- May J. (born 1988), Japanese singer
- May Kassab (born 1981), Egyptian artist
- May Maple (1914–2012), electrical engineer, president of the Women's Engineering Society
- May McAvoy (1899–1984), American actor
- May A. Moir (1907–2001) American floral designer, orchid breeder, botanical collector, and horticulturalist
- May Mourning Farris McKinney (1874–1959), American non-profit executive
- May Mikati, wife of Najib Mikati, Lebanese prime minister
- May W. Newburger (1920–2012), New York politician
- May Robson (1858–1942), Australian actress
- May Sarton (1912–1995), American poet and novelist
- May Sayegh (1940–2023), Palestinian poet and activist
- May Scaff (1969–2018) Syrian actress and activist
- Lady May Abel Smith (1906–1994), a member of the British royal family
- May Erwin Talmadge (1885–1973), American civic leader and 19th President General of the Daughters of the American Revolution
- May Thai (born 1997), Italian nude model
- May Tha Hla, Anglo-Burmese psychologist and activist
- May Whitty (1865–1948), English actress
- May Yarrowick (1876–1949) Australian Aboriginal mid-wife
- May Ziadeh (1886–1941), Lebanese-Palestinian poet and writer

=== Men ===
- May (governor), Ancient Egyptian official
- May (noble), Ancient Egyptian Royal chancellor

== Fictional characters ==
- May, one of the main characters in Geoffrey Chaucer's "The Merchant's Tale"
- Aunt May, Spider-Man's aunt and primary caregiver
- May Bellamy, girlfriend of John Dortmunder in novels by Donald E. Westlake
- May, a character from the 1988 movie 14 Going on 30
- May, localize version of Mii, main character in Jungle de Ikou!
- May, in the show Sid the Science Kid
- May Kanker, youngest of the Kanker sisters in the animated series Ed, Edd n Eddy
- May Kasahara, in Haruki Murakami's novel The Wind-Up Bird Chronicle
- May Lee (The King of Fighters), in The King of Fighters fighting game series
- Melinda May, a S.H.I.E.L.D. agent played by Ming-Na Wen in Agents of S.H.I.E.L.D. and subsequently appearing in Marvel comics
- May (Guilty Gear), a character in the Guilty Gear video game series
- May, an American Pekin duck from the Donald Duck universe
- May, protagonist of Pokémon Ruby and Sapphire who appears as a rival instead if the player picks her male counterpart Brendan. An anime counterpart with the same name appears in the Pokémon TV series

== See also ==
- Mei (given name), also spelled as May
- Mae (given name)
- Mai (Arabic name), also written as May
