= Mai =

Mai, or MAI, may refer to:

== Names ==
- Mai (Vietnamese surname)
- Mai (name)
- Mai (singer), J-Pop singer
- Mak (surname), Cantonese transliteration of Mai

== Places ==
- Chiang Mai, largest city in northern Thailand
- Ma-i, a pre-Hispanic Philippine state
- Mai, Non Sung, Thailand

== Organisations ==
- Malmö AI, Swedish athletics club
- Manufacturers Association of Israel, an Israeli business organization
- Marina Abramović Institute, a performance art organization
- Market for Alternative Investment, a stock market for small/medium enterprises in Thailand
- Microsoft AI, AI division of Microsoft
- Montreal Arts Interculturels, a multidisciplinary cultural organization in Montreal, Canada
- Moscow Aviation Institute, an engineering and aviation university in Russia
- Motorsports Association of India, the FIA arm of Indian Motorsports

== Science and technology ==
- Machine augmented intelligence, use of technology to amplify and empower human thought and consciousness
- Mean annual increment, a measure of the average growth per year a tree or stand of trees has exhibited at a specified age
- Multiple Access Interference, a type of interference that occurs in code-division multiple access (CDMA) systems
- Mycobacterium avium-intracellulare infection, an atypical mycobacterial infection that was a common cause of wasting and death in the early AIDS Crisis

== Transport ==
- MAI, the National Rail code for Maidenhead railway station in the county of Berkshire, UK
- Marine Accident Investigation, investigation of shipping accidents
- Myanmar Airways International, an airline from Myanmar (Burma)

== Film and television ==
- Mai (2024 film), a film by Trấn Thành
- Mai (1989 film), a Bhojpuri film
- Mai (2013 film), a Bollywood film featuring Asha Bhosle
- Mai (TV series), a 2022 Netflix India Original series

== Other uses ==
- Mai Shiranui, a character appearing in the Fatal Fury and The King of Fighters series.
- Mai, a pronouncing dubbed name for main character in Jungle de Ikou!
- Mai, a character from Avatar: The Last Airbender
- Mai, month May in several Indonesian local languages, including Banjarese and Minangkabau
- Mai FM, a New Zealand radio network
- Mai TV, a television channel in the Fiji Islands
- "Mai", a song by Josh Groban on his album Awake Live
- mai, the ISO 639 code for the Maithili language spoken in India and Nepal
- Multilateral Agreement on Investment, a proposed OECD treaty for which negotiations were abandoned in 1998
- The Mai, fictional supernatural beings in The Nine Lives of Chloe King
- Mai Minakami, one of the 3 main characters of Nichijou

== See also ==
- Maij
