= Mei (given name) =

- Gender: Female

Origin
- Origin: Japanese, Chinese
- Meaning: It can have many different meanings depending on the character used

Other names
- Related names: Meiko; Meina; Meika; Meihui; Meizhen

Mei (Japanese: メイ, Mandarin: 美) is a feminine given name used in various cultures, particularly Japan and China.

== Written forms ==
Mei can be written using different kanji characters and can mean:

- 芽衣, "sprout, garment"
- 芽依, "sprout, reliant"
- 明依, "bright, reliant"
- 鳴, "ring or echo"

The name can also be written in hiragana or katakana.

Mei can also be written using different Chinese characters:

- 美, "beautiful"
- 梅, "Chinese plum"

== People with the given name Mei ==
=== From Japan ===
- May J. (芽生), a Japanese R&B singer.
- Mei Ehara (茗一), Japanese interdisciplinary artist.
- Mei Fukuda (愛依), Japanese actress
- Mei Kodama (芽生), Japanese sprinter.
- Mei Kurokawa, (芽以), a Japanese actress and singer
- Mei Kotake (芽生), Japanese rock climber.
- Mei Matsunami (芽依), Japanese field hockey player.
- Mei Matsuoka (芽衣), Japanese-English children's author and illustrator.
- Mei Miura (芽依; born 1998), Japanese ice hockey player
- May Nakabayashi (芽依), a Japanese J-Pop artist
- Mei Nagano (芽郁), a Japanese actress
- Mei Ohtani (芽生), Japanese rugby sevens player.
- Mei Okada (夢以), Japanese singer and voice actress.
- Mei Sato (めい), Japanese ice hockey goaltender
- Mei Shigenobu (メイ), the daughter of Japanese Red Army communist Fusako Shigenobu.
- Mei Shimada (芽依), Japanese footballer.
- Mai Shiraishi (麻衣), Japanese tarento, model and YouTuber.
- Mei Suruga (メイ), Japanese wrestler.
- Mei Suzuki (芽依), Japanese professional wrestler.
- Mei Yamaguchi (芽生), Japanese mixed martial artist.
- Mei Yamaguchi (tennis) (芽生), Japanese tennis player.

=== From China ===
- Mei Fong (方凤美), a Chinese-American journalist.
- Guo Mei (郭梅), Chinese haematologist.
- Guo Mei (rower) (郭梅), Chinese rower.
- Han Mei (韩梅), Chinese guzheng performer and scholar.
- Han Mei (speed skater) (韩梅), Chinese speed skater.
- Leng Mei (冷枚), Chinese painter.
- Lu Mei (陆梅), Chinese professional racing cyclist.
- Mei Hong (chemist), a Chinese-American chemist.
- Hong Mei (athlete) (洪梅), a female Chinese athlete.
- Hu Mei (director) (胡玫), Chinese film director, television director and producer.
- Hu Mei (gymnast) (胡美), Chinese rhythmic gymnast.
- Huang Mei (黄梅), Chinese sprinter.
- Mei Lin (actress) (梅琳), a Chinese actress.
- Mei Wang (王媚), Chinese academic.
- Yong Mei (咏梅), Chinese actress.

=== From other countries ===
- Mei Hubnik, Australian acrobatic gymnast
- Mei Joni, an Indonesian basketball player
- Mei Mac, British stage actress
- Meital Slominsky, known by her stage name Mei Finegold

== Fictional characters with the given name Mei ==
=== Japanese characters ===
- Mey-Rin (メイリン), a character in the manga series Black Butler
- Mei (メイ), a character in the manga series O-Parts Hunter
- Mei (メイ), a character in the tokusatsu television series Kyōryū Sentai Zyuranger
- Mei Hatsume, a character in the manga and anime series My Hero Academia
- Mei Kusakabe, (草壁メイ), a character in the movie My Neighbor Totoro
- Mei Meido (銘戸 芽衣), a character in the manga and anime series The 100 Girlfriends Who Really, Really, Really, Really, Really Love You
- Mei Misaki (見崎 鳴), a character in the novel Another
- Mei Narumiya (成宮 鳴), a character in the manga series Ace of Diamond
- Mei Narusegawa (成瀬川 メイ), a character in the manga series Love Hina
- Mei Sunohara (春原 芽衣), a character in the visual novel Clannad
- Mei Terumi (照美 メイ), a character in the manga and anime series Naruto
- Mei Yasumura (安村 メイ), a character in the manga and anime series Ouran High School Host Club
- Mei Yoneme (米女 メイ), a character in the media franchise Love Live! Superstar!!
- May Chang (メイ・チャン), a main character in the manga series Fullmetal Alchemist

=== Other characters ===
- Li Mei, a character in the Mortal Kombat series
- Mei (Overwatch), a playable character in Overwatch and Heroes of the Storm
- Mei, a character from Galactik Football
- Mei Lee, a main character in the Disney-Pixar film Turning Red

== See also ==
- Mei (surname)
- Mai (name)
