= Mai (name) =

Female given name and family name

Mai is a name that is used as a given name and a surname.

== People with the given name ==
- Mai (Arabic name)
- Mai (Ra'iatean man), also known as Omai, the first person from the Pacific Islands to visit Europe
- Mai (singer) (born 1984), formerly known as Ruppina, a J-Pop singer
- Mai Atafo, Nigerian fashion designer
- Mai Charoenpura, Thai pop singer from Bangkok
- Mai Fuchigami (born 1987), Japanese voice actress and singer
- Mai Fujisawa (藤澤 麻衣; born 1980), Japanese singer and songwriter
- Mai Fukagawa (born 1991), Japanese actress and former singer
- Mai Gehrke (born 1964), Danish mathematician
- Mai Kadowaki, Japanese voice actress
- Mai Kolossova (born 1937), Estonian politician
- Mai Kuraki (born 1982), J-pop singer
- Mai Hagiwara (born 1996), J-pop singer under Hello! Project and a member of the Japanese band, Cute
- Mai Hoshimura (born 1981), J-pop singer
- Mai Ito (born 1984), Japanese marathon runner
- Mai Kondo (近藤 真衣; born 1992), Japanese ice hockey player
- Mai Matsumuro (born 1983), Japanese singer, composer and a former member of J-pop girl band, Dream
- Mai Mihara (三原 舞依; born 1999), Japanese figure skater
- Mai Miyagi (宮城 舞; born 1988), Japanese model and television personality
- Mai Mukaida (向田 麻衣; born 1982), Japanese make-up artist and businesswoman
- Mai Murakami, Japanese artistic gymnast
- Mai Murdmaa (1938–2026), Estonian choreographer, ballet dancer, ballet master and director
- Mai Nakahara (born 1981), Japanese voice actress and singer
- Mai Narva (born 1999), Estonian chess player
- Mai Raud-Pähn (1920–2024), Estonian-Swedish art historian, editor and journalist
- Mai Shiraishi (born 1992), Japanese singer and actress
- Mai Traore (born 1999), Guinean footballer
- Mai Villadsen (born 1991), Danish politician
- Mai Yamada, Taiwanese politician
- Mai Yamamoto (山本 麻衣; born 1999), Japanese basketball player
- Mai Yamane, (born 1958), Japanese English-language blues singer
- Mai Zetterling, Swedish actress and film director

== People with the surname ==
- Mai (Chinese surname), the Chinese surname 麥 (simplified 麦), pronounced Mak in Cantonese
- Mai (Vietnamese surname) (梅), Vietnamese pronunciation of Mei
- Angelo Mai (1782–1854), Italian Cardinal and philologist
- Ella Mai, British singer and songwriter
- Iris Mai (born 1962), German chess master
- Jeannie Mai, American makeup artist, fashion expert, actress, and TV personality
- Josef Mai (1887–1982), German World War I flying ace
- Lukas Mai (born 2000), German footballer
- Mai Huu Xuan, Vietnamese general
- Ulrike Mai (born 1960), German actress
- Vanessa Mai, German singer

== Fictional characters ==
- Mai, a supporting character in the animated show Avatar: The Last Airbender and the graphic novels.
- Mai, one of Pilaf's henchmen in Dragon Ball
- Mai, a main character from the anime and eroge game in Popotan
- Mai from Senran Kagura video game franchise
- Mai Azabu, a character in the multimedia project Ikizulive! Love Live! Bluebird
- Mai Hakua, a character in Bakuryū Sentai Abaranger
- Mai Kanzaki, a character in Idol x Warrior Miracle Tunes!
- Mai Kawakami, a character in the novel and anime Myriad Colors Phantom World who serves as the main protagonist's training partner
- Mai Kawasumi, a character from the visual novel, anime, and manga in Kanon
- Mai Kazami (Trixie in the English dub), a character from the anime Speed Racer X
- Mai Kobayashi, a character in Super Robot Wars: Original Generations
- Mai Kuju, from Mai the Psychic Girl, a 1985 manga
- Mai Meido, a character in The 100 Girlfriends Who Really, Really, Really, Really, Really Love You
- Mai Midorikawa, a character in Ultraman Dyna
- Mai Minakami, a main character from the anime and manga series Nichijou
- Mai Mishō, co-protagonist of Futari wa Pretty Cure Splash Star
- Mai Natsume, a character in the video game series BlazBlue
- Mai Nametsu, a manager of Date Teach High in manga series Haikyū!!
- Mai Ninomiya, a character in the 2020 anime film Josee, the Tiger and the Fish
- Mai Otohime, a character in the manga and anime series Kill Blue
- Mai Sakura, a character in Photo Kano
- Mai Sakurajima, a character in Rascal Does Not Dream of Bunny Girl Senpai
- Mai Shiranui, a character in the Fatal Fury and The King of Fighters series of video games
- Mai Taniyama, a character in the anime and manga Ghost Hunt
- Mai Tateno, a character in Inazuma Eleven
- Mai Teireida, a character from the video game Hidden Star in Four Seasons in the Touhou Project franchise
- Mai Tokiha, the title character in the anime and manga My-HiME (originally Mai-HiME), and a supporting character in My-Otome
- Mai Tsubasa (aka Change Phoenix), a character in Dengeki Sentai Changeman
- Mai Valentine (Mai Kujaku in the Japanese version), a character from the anime Yu-Gi-Oh! Duel Monsters
- Mai Zenin, a character in Jujutsu Kaisen

== See also ==
- Mai (disambiguation)
