= Completeness (Ave Mujica album) =

2025 studio album by Ave Mujica

Studio album by Ave Mujica
- Released: April 23, 2025
- Studios: Studio Mech, Sound City, Tokyo; Fennel Studio, Shibuya, Tokyo
- Genres: Symphonic metal; metalcore; gothic rock; pop; video game music; anime song
- Length: 28:00
- Language: Japanese
- Label: Bushiroad Music
- Producer: Hiroki Matsumoto

Ave Mujica chronology
Elements (2024)	Completeness (2025)	Ave Música (2026)

Singles from Completeness
- 1. "Killkiss" Released: January 8, 2025; 2. "Georgette Me, Georgette You" Released: January 15, 2025; 3. "Imprisoned XII" Released: March 6, 2025; 4. "Crucifix X" Released: March 6, 2025; 5. "Musica Caelestis" Released: April 3, 2025; 6. "Alter Ego" Released: April 17, 2025

Completeness is the debut studio album by Japanese metal band Ave Mujica. It was released on April 23, 2025, by Bushiroad Music.

The album features seven tracks with a total length of 28 minutes, including "Killkiss" and "Georgette Me, Georgette You" which were used as opening and ending theme songs for the first season of BanG Dream! Ave Mujica anime series. The remaining five songs of the album were also used as insert songs in the same series.

The album managed to rank in the official Japanese Album Charts by Oricon as well in the Hot Album Charts published by Billboard Japan.

== Background and release ==
Bushiroad Music announced the album on February 14, 2025, with the estimated release date on April 23. The album was recorded at Mech Studio, Sound City in Tokyo while mixing took place at Fennel Studio in Shibuya, Tokyo. The song's lyrics were entirely written by Diggy-MO', a former member of Japanese hiphop group Soul'd Out, while he was part in composing the music as well among others.

On January 15, 2025, the single "Killkiss" alongside the coupling track "Georgette Me, Georgette You" was released. The songs were used as opening and ending theme song for the anime television series BanG Dream! Ave Mujica respectively. On March 6, 2025, the digital release of the songs "Imprisoned XII" and "Crucifix X" followed after both songs were used as insert songs in the tenth episode of the anime series. About a month later, the song "Musica Caelestis" was published as digital download and via music streaming. Six days prior to the albums' release, the song "Alter Ego" was officially released.

The album was released on two versions: Regular Edition and Limited Edition. The latter featured a Blu-ray disc containing the band's fourth concert "Adventus" recorded in its entirety. People who had ordered a physical copy of the album received a second CD featuring a bonus song varying on where the album had been ordered. (Note: The songs on the bonus CD were a live-recorded versions of songs initially released on the Elements EP entitled Adventus Version.)

== Reception ==
Katarina McGinn, writer for Dead Rhetoric, described Completeness as a powerful listen whether or not having checked out the Ave Mujica anime. McGinn further wrote that the music blends elements of symphonic metal, gothic rock, metalcore and pop, the band [Ave Mujica] represent something fresh. According to the critic the album is "resoundingly heavy, playfully melodic, gloriously cinematic, and spellbindingly addictive to listen to." In her conclusion, Completeness is one of the strongest releases in 2025 to date.

== Commercial performance ==
Completeness managed to sell approximately 27.000 physical copies in its first week after release leading the album to rank at no. 7 in the official Oricon Albums Chart. (Note: The official Oricon Album and Singles Charts only count physical sales. Works released digitally only are not eligible to chart in the official Album and Singles Charts published by Oricon.) When the album's first single KiLLKiSS was initially released, it managed to sell about the same amount in its debut week resulting the single charting at fourth place in the Oricon Singles Charts.

Completeness charted on 47th place in the Hot Albums Charts published by Billboard Japan and stayed in the charts for one week.

== Track listing ==
All lyrics are written by Diggy-MO', except where noted.

Completeness track listing
No.	Title	Music	Arrangement	Length
1.	"Killkiss"	Diggy-MO'; Daisuke Hasegawa	Daisuke Hasegawa	3:28
2.	"Georgette Me, Georgette You"	Diggy-MO'; Koji Matsuzaka	Koji Matsuzaka	3:54
3.	"Imprisoned XII"	Diggy-MO'; Koji Matsuzaka	Koji Matsuzaka	3:08
4.	"Crucifix X"	Diggy-MO'; o-saka	o-saka	5:00
5.	"Octagram Dance (八芒星ダンス, Hachibousei Dance)"	Diggy-MO'; araken	araken	3:49
6.	"Alter Ego (顔, Kao)"	Diggy-MO'; Ryuhei Kinoshita	Ryuhei Kinoshita	4:02
7.	"Musica Caelestis (天球(そら)のMúsica, Sora no Música)"	Diggy-MO'; Ryo Takahashi	Ryo Takahashi	4:39
Total length:				28:00

Limited edition bonus BD
No.	Title	Lyrics	Music	Arrangement	Length
1.	"Black Birthday (黒のバースデイ, Kuro no Birthday)" (live at Adventus)		Gasa Yasuhiro	Gasa Yasuhiro	3:46
2.	"Two Moons (ふたつの月 ~Deep Into The Forest~, Futatsu no Tsuki ~Deep Into The Forest~)" (live at Adventus)		Daisuke Hasegawa	Daisuke Hasegawa	4:56
3.	"Choir ‘S’ Choir" (live at Adventus)		Mai Kakumoto	Mai Kakumoto	4:38
4.	"Memento Mori (神さま、バカ, Kamisama, Baka)" (live at Adventus)		Takahito Makishima	Takahito Makishima	3:34
5.	"Masquerade Rhapsody Request" (live at Adventus)		araken	araken	4:02
6.	"Ave Mujica" (live at Adventus)	Asuka Oda; Noriyasu Agematsu	Noriyasu Agematsu	Hitoshi Fujima	4:15
7.	""Utopia" (素晴らしき世界 でも どこにもない場所, Subarashiki Sekai demo Dokonimonai Basho)" (live at Adventus)		Diggy-MO'; Daisuke Hasegawa	Daisuke Hasegawa	4:28
8.	"Angles" (live at Adventus)		Diggy-MO'; Daisuke Hasegawa	Daisuke Hasegawa	4:35
9.	"Symbol I : △" (live at Adventus)		Diggy-MO'; Daisuke Hasegawa	Daisuke Hasegawa	5:12
10.	"Symbol II: Air" (live at Adventus)		Diggy-MO'; Daisuke Hasegawa	Daisuke Hasegawa	3:32
11.	"Symbol III : ▽" (live at Adventus)		Diggy-MO'; Kazuki Tomita	Kazuki Tomita	4:16
12.	"Symbol IV: Earth" (live at Adventus)		Diggy-MO'; Daisuke Hasegawa	Daisuke Hasegawa	3:59
13.	"Ether" (live at Adventus)		Diggy-MO'; Daisuke Hasegawa	Daisuke Hasegawa	4:45
14.	"Killkiss" (live at Adventus)		Diggy-MO'; Daisuke Hasegawa	Daisuke Hasegawa	3:28
Total length:					59:32

=== Notes ===
- "Killkiss" is stylized as KiLLKiSS.
- "Masquerade Rhapsody Request" is stylized as Mas?uerade Rhapsody Re?uest.

== Charts ==
Chart (2025)	Peak position
Japanese Albums (Oricon)	7
Japanese Combined Albums (Oricon)	7
Japanese Anime Albums (Oricon)	1
Japanese Rock Albums (Oricon)	3
Japanese Hot Albums (Billboard Japan)	47
Top Albums Sales (Billboard Japan)	6
Download Albums (Billboard Japan)	4
