= Elements (Ave Mujica EP) =

2024 extended play by Ave Mujica

- Digital and standard edition cover

EP by Ave Mujica
- Released: October 2, 2024
- Studio: Mech Studio, Sound City, Tokyo; Supa Love Studio, Tokyo; Fennel Studio, Shibuya, Tokyo; Tucky's Mastering, Tokyo
- Genre: Symphonic metal; heavy metal; video game music; anime song
- Length: 21:46
- Language: Japanese
- Label: Bushiroad Music
- Producer: Hiroki Matsumoto

Ave Mujica chronology
| Alea jacta est (2023) | Elements (2024) | Completeness (2025) |

Singles from Elements
- 1. "Symbol I : △" Released: April 7, 2024; 2. "Symbol II : Air" Released: May 18, 2024; 3. "Symbol III : ▽" Released: June 15, 2024; 4. "Symbol II : Earth" Released: July 8, 2024; 5. "Ether" Released: August 30, 2024

Elements is the second extended play by Japanese metal band Ave Mujica. It was released on October 2, 2024, via Bushiroad Music.

The EP features five tracks with a total playing time of 21 minutes and 46 seconds. The work managed to chart in the official Japanese Albums Chart published by Oricon.

== Background and release ==
On July 7, 2024, it was announced that an EP was set to be released in October the same year entitled Elements. The information was made public on the same day of the band's second live concert titled "Quaerere Lumina". The EP was officially released on October 2, the same year. The lyrics were written by Diggy-MO', a former member of the Japanese hip hop group Soul'd Out.

Elements was recorded at Mech Studio, Sound City, Tokyo and at Supa Love Studio Tokyo while mixing took place at Fennel Studio in Shibuya, Tokyo. The EP was produced by Koki Ogata. Mastering engineer was Hiromichi "Tucky" Takiguchi who mastered the EP at his own mastering studio.

Elements was released in a regular and a limited version. The latter featured a blu-ray disc containing the group's second concert "Quaerere Lumina" in its entirety.

== Reception ==
Katarina McGinn of Dead Rhetoric reviewed the EP and wrote that Elements became a massive springboard to ensnare both, the BanG Dream! community as well as certain parts of the heavy metal crowd. McGinn further stated the music blurs the line between beauty and melancholy, with plenty of guitar fireworks and riffage that's augmented by synths instead of being overshadowed by them. She added that the timing of a musical release could not be better given the fact that an anime series revolving around the band is set to air in the beginning of 2025. She prognosed that the group may spread like wildfire and Elements would back up that claim.

== Commercial performance ==
Elements sold more than 6.900 physical copies in its first week after release resulting the EP charting on fifth place in the official Albums Charts published by Oricon. By the end of October 2024, the EP had sold more than 9.700 physical copies in Japan alone.

In the Hot Albums Charts published by Billboard Japan, Elements peaked at no. 7 and stayed in the charts for four weeks.

== Track listing ==
All lyrics are written by Diggy-MO'.

Elements track listing
| No. | Title | Music | Arrangement | Length |
|---|---|---|---|---|
| 1. | "Symbol I : △" | Diggy-MO'; Daisuke Hasegawa | Daisuke Hasegawa | 5:12 |
| 2. | "Symbol II: Air" | Diggy-MO'; Ryo Takahashi | Ryo Takahashi | 3:32 |
| 3. | "Symbol III : ▽" | Diggy-MO'; Kazuki Tomita | Kazuki Tomita | 4:16 |
| 4. | "Symbol IV: Earth" | Diggy-MO'; Daisuke Hasegawa | Daisuke Hasegawa | 3:59 |
| 5. | "Ether" | Diggy-MO'; Daisuke Hasegawa | Daisuke Hasegawa | 4:45 |
| Total length: | | | | 21:46 |

== Charts ==
| Chart (2024) | Peak position |
|---|---|
| Japanese Albums (Oricon) | 5 |
| Japanese Combined Albums (Oricon) | 9 |
| Japanese Anime Albums (Oricon) | 2 |
| Japanese Rock Albums (Oricon) | 1 |
| Japanese Hot Albums (Billboard Japan) | 7 |
| Top Albums Sales (Billboard Japan) | 5 |
| Download Albums (Billboard Japan) | 64 |
