= Meiko =

Meiko may refer to:

- Meiko (given name)
- Meiko (singer) (born 1982), American singer-songwriter
  - Meiko (album), her self-titled album
- Meikō Line, Nagoya Municipal Subway, Japan
- Meiko Nishi Ohashi roadway bridges, Nagoya, Japan
- Meiko Scientific, defunct British supercomputer manufacturer
- Meiko (software), a Japanese Vocaloid from Crypton Future Media and voiced by Meiko Haigō
