= Ave Mujica =

Japanese metal band

- Ave Mujica in BanG Dream! Our Notes. From left to right: Oblivionis, Timoris, Doloris, Amoris, Mortis

Background information
- Origin: Japan
- Genres: Heavy metal; gothic metal; symphonic metal; anime song
- Years active: 2023–present
- Label: Bushiroad Music
- Spinoff of: BanG Dream!
- Members: Kanon Takao (Oblivionis); Yuzuki Watase (Mortis); Mei Okada (Timoris); Rico Sasaki (Doloris); Akane Yonezawa (Amoris)
- Website: bushiroad-music.com/artists/avemujica/

Ave Mujica is a Japanese all-female metal band that is part of Bushiroad's BanG Dream! media franchise. Formed in 2023, the group's members portray fictional characters in the project's anime series and mobile games BanG Dream! Girls Band Party! and BanG Dream! Our Notes, in addition to performing their characters' respective instruments in live concerts.

The band consists of Kanon Takao (keys), Yuzuki Watase (rhythm guitar), Rico Sasaki (lead guitar and vocals), Mei Okada (bass), and Akane Yonezawa (drums). In the game, Ave Mujica is represented by five first-year high-school students who make appearances during the game adaptation of the story of MyGO!!!!!: Sakiko Togawa (Takao), Mutsumi Wakaba (Watase), Uika Misumi (Sasaki), Umiri Yahata (Okada), and Nyamu Yūtenji (Yonezawa).

The members go by the nicknames Oblivionis, Mortis, Doloris, Timoris, and Amoris respectively, all inspired by various lunar maria. It symbolizes the subtle emotional experiences of the original characters, the more precise meaning of which is revealed in the official anime series.

Of the twelve bands in BanG Dream!, Ave Mujica is one of seven whose members perform their own music.

== History ==
=== 2023–2024: Debut, early activities and anime series ===
Prior to their debut, Ave Mujica was teased during MyGO!!!!!'s 4th concert on April 9, 2023, through a single exhibit showcasing a wooden box, and its content was disseminated to influencers and publications via an alternate reality game, before its associated music video was subsequently released. On April 11, the band made their debut with the digital single "Black Birthday". On June 4, as part of the final music festival for Nakano Sunplaza, their first concert, dubbed "Primo die in scaena", was held. On September 13, the band released their first extended play Alea jacta est, which includes the previously released five digital singles.

On January 17, 2024, following the reveal of the band's members, the band held their second concert titled "Perdere Omnia". Following the concert, it was announced that the band would released their first single titled "Utopia" on April 24. It was also announced that the band would release new songs on five consecutive months. On July 7, the band held their third live concert titled "Quaerere Lumina". On July 20, the band performed their first international festival attending at Bilibili Macro Link in Shanghai, China. Following the "Quaerere Lumina" concert, it was announced that the band would release their second extended play titled Elements on October 2. On October 18, it was revealed that an anime series focusing on the band, titled BanG Dream! Ave Mujica, would set to premiere on January 2, 2025.

=== 2025–present: "Killkiss" and first studio album ===
On January 15, 2025, Ave Mujica released their second single titled "Killkiss", serving as the opening theme for BanG Dream! Ave Mujica. The single's b-side, titled "Georgette Me, Georgette You", serves as the ending theme for the same series. On April 23, following the conclusion of the anime series, the band released their first studio album titled Completeness, which included both the opening and ending theme for the anime series.

On June 7, the band performed Animelo Summer Live in Manila, Philippines for the first time. A month later, the band played at Bilibili Macro Link in Shanghai, China. The band is set to play Japan Jam, Rock in Japan and Summer Sonic music festivals during the summer. On July 26, the band held their sixth concert, titled "Nova Historia" at LaLa arena TOKYO-BAY. On August 4, the band released "Divine", a theme song for the 2025 video game Progress Orders, published by Bushiroad. In December 2025, Ave Mujica released a single entitled S/ the Way/Sophie with the first song being used in the ending sequence of Cardfight Vanguard Divinez Deluxe Finals Arc anime television series. Between April and June 2026, the band performed five shows in Japan as part of their Exitus Tour. During these concerts, a special version of the S/ the Way were available for purchase containing the song with vocals provided by Diggy-MO'.

On July 16, 2026, the band is set to release their first best-of album entitled Ave Música.

On September 23, 2026, Ave Mujica released a cover version of Lady Gaga's song "Abracadabra". The track and its accompanying music video were launched as a promotional crossover to celebrate the worldwide release of the mobile rhythm game BanG Dream! Our Notes, published by Bilibili Game, debuting as an in-game exclusive.

== Members ==
During Ave Mujica's first live, the identities of the band's performers were concealed through the use of limited stage lighting and cloaks. The identities of the band's members were revealed in the final episode of the anime BanG Dream! It's MyGO!!!!!.

- Kanon Takao (keyboardist) – Takao had previously practiced piano, stating that she has been playing classical piano since the age of three, even winning an international contest in Milan at the age of 10, which she says motivated her to further improve her skills as a pianist. Ave Mujica was Takao's first time playing music as part of a band. Prior to being cast as Oblivionis/Sakiko Togawa, she notably voiced characters such as Hina Tsurugi in Diary of Our Days at the Breakwater, Noelle in Genshin Impact, and Rit in Banished from the Hero's Party.
- Yuzuki Watase (rhythm guitar) – Watase had previously voice acted in another Bushiroad franchise D4DJ as Miiko Takeshita of Lyrical Lily, prior to being cast as Mortis/Mutsumi Wakaba. She had begun playing the seven-string guitar upon joining Ave Mujica.
- Rico Sasaki (lead guitar and vocals) – Prior to voicing Doloris/Uika Misumi, Sasaki had experience playing the electric and acoustic six-string guitar for her solo career as a singer, and from a brief time in middle school before dropping it until said career, though playing a seven-string was new to her. She also notably voiced characters such as Poporon in Dropkick on My Devil!, and Ayako Yamada in Kageki Shojo!!.
- Mei Okada (bass guitar) – Like Watase, Okada had also previously voice acted in D4DJ as Marika Mizushima of Merm4id. Prior to joining Ave Mujica and being cast as Timoris/Umiri Yahata, she admitted her only musical experience was with the piano, but coincidentally started learning the bass 3 months prior to joining Ave Mujica.
- Akane Yonezawa (drums) – Yonezawa learned to play drums since the fourth grade and played in bands as a hobby as she continued studying. She moved to Tokyo due to her desire as a drummer. She joined Ave Mujica and voices Amoris/Nyamu Yūtenji in her first voice acting role.

== In-universe band ==
In the anime, Ave Mujica is one of two bands, the other being MyGO!!!!!, created following the breakup of Sakiko and Mutsumi's former band Crychic in their third year of middle school. In It's MyGO!!!!!, Sakiko spearheaded the effort of forming the band after watching her former Crychic bandmates Tomori, Soyo, and Taki perform their song without her consent. Throughout the second half of the series, as the focus was still on the members of MyGO!!!!!, Sakiko gradually recruited the members of her new band, who were shown to be individuals that the members of MyGO!!!!! have interacted with or have knowledge of.

The band made its anime debut in the final episode of It's MyGO!!!!!. A direct sequel, BanG Dream! Ave Mujica, follows the titular band and its exploits.

== Sound ==
Ave Mujica's music can be classified as metal, particularly symphonic metal, with its classical and majestic atmosphere. This style reflects the perfectly-crafted masquerade and Sakiko's roots as a classical composer.....However, just as the masquerade serves as both a stage and a reflection of the band members, the sound is designed to balance its grandeur with a sense of illusion. Rather than seeking profound truths, the music aims to offer an intoxicating escape from reality and guilt, embodying the mysterious world of Ave Mujica.

— Anime director Kodai Kakimoto talks about the influence of gothic aesthetics on the project's music and sound design in an interview with MyAnimeList.

While writers of material for the band have primarily described their music as gothic and symphonic metal, various music media outlets have also found noticeable influences from gothic rock, metalcore, and pop music in their work.

== Reception ==
Rolling Stone Japan selected Ave Mujica as one of 25 musical acts to represent Japan in the publication's 2024 "Future of Music" issue.

== Discography ==
As of 23 April 2025, Ave Mujica has released 20 original songs, including several digital singles. Diggy-MO', best known for being a member of hip-hop group Soul'd Out, frequently serves as the primary lyricist for the band, a contrast from other bands in the franchise who frequently work with Elements Garden. The band debuted with the digital single "Black Birthday" on 11 April 2023. The band released their first studio album Completeness on 23 April 2025.

=== Studio albums ===
Year	Title	Release date	Peak Oricon chart position	Notes	Ref
2025	Completeness	April 23	7		

=== Compilation albums ===
Year	Title	Release date	Peak Oricon chart position	Notes	Ref
2026	Ave Musica	June 17	4		

=== Extended plays ===
Year	Title	Release date	Peak Oricon chart position	Notes	Ref
2023	Alea jacta est	September 13	14		
2024	Elements (Note: Stylized in all caps.)	November 2	5		
2026	"In the Name of God" (神の名を, Kami no Na wo)	October 21	9		

=== Singles ===
Year	Title	Release date	Peak Oricon chart position	Notes	Ref
2024	"Utopia" (素晴らしき世界 でも どこにもない場所, Subarashiki Sekai demo Dokonimonai Basho)	April 24	13		
2025	"Killkiss" (Note: Stylized as "KiLLKiSS".)	January 15	4		
2025	"S the Way / Sophie" (Note: The first song is stylized as "'S/' The Way")	December 10	4		

== Concerts ==
Date	Title	City	Country	Venue	Ref.
June 4, 2023	Ave Mujica 0th LIVE「Primo die in scaena」	Tokyo	Japan	Nakano Sun Plaza Hall	
January 27, 2024	Ave Mujica 1st LIVE「Perdere Omnia」	Yokosuka	Japan	Yokosuka Arts Theater	
June 8, 2024	Ave Mujica 2nd LIVE「Quaerere Lumina」	Yokohama	Japan	Kanagawa Kenmin Hall	
July 7, 2024	Ave Mujica 2nd LIVE「Quaerere Lumina」	Nagoya	Japan	Aichi Arts Center	
October 13, 2024	Ave Mujica 3rd LIVE「Veritas」	Fujikawaguchiko	Japan	Kawaguchiko Stellar Theater	
December 15, 2024	Ave Mujica 4th LIVE「Adventus」	Tokyo	Japan	Musashino Forest Sport Plaza	
February 2, 2025	Ave Mujica Special Live「KiLLKiSS」	Yokohama	Japan	KT Zepp Yokohama	
July 26-27, 2025	Ave Mujica 5th LIVE「Nova Historia」	Tokyo	Japan	LaLa arena TOKYO-BAY	
December 14, 2025	Ave Mujica 6th Live「Ulterius Procedere」	Tokyo	Japan	Tokyo International Forum	
January 15, 2026	Ave Mujica 6th Live「Ulterius Procedere」	Osaka	Japan	Grand Cube Osaka	
April 17, 2026	Ave Mujica LIVE TOUR 2026「Exitus」	Fukuoka	Japan	Zepp Fukuoka	
April 26, 2026	Ave Mujica LIVE TOUR 2026「Exitus」	Osaka	Japan	Zepp Namba	
May 1, 2026	Ave Mujica LIVE TOUR 2026「Exitus」	Nagoya	Japan	Zepp Nagoya	
May 4, 2026	Ave Mujica LIVE TOUR 2026「Exitus」	Tokyo	Japan	Zepp Haneda	
June 19-20, 2026	Ave Mujica LIVE TOUR 2026「Exitus」	Tokyo	Japan	SGC Hall Ariake	
August 8-9, 2026	Ave Mujica LIVE TOUR 2026「Exitus」	Taoyuan	Taiwan	NTSU Arena	
October 24-25, 2026	Ave Mujica 7th LIVE「Virtus」	Tokyo	Japan	Keio Arena Tokyo	
