= Yuzuki Watase =

Japanese voice actress

- 渡瀬 結月
- Born: February 18, 2003 (age 23); Chiba Prefecture, Japan
- Occupation: Voice actress
- Years active: 2020–present
- Employer: Hibiki
- Notable work: D4DJ as Miiko Takeshita; BanG Dream! as Mortis/Mutsumi Wakaba
- Height: 153 cm (5 ft 0 in)
- Musical career
- Member of: Lyrical Lily; Ave Mujica

Yuzuki Watase (Japanese: 渡瀬 結月, Hepburn: Watase Yuzuki; born 18 February 2003) is a Japanese voice actress affiliated with Hibiki. She started her career portraying Miiko Takeshita as part of Lyrical Lily, one of the musical groups in Bushiroad's D4DJ franchise. She is the rhythm guitarist for the band Ave Mujica of the BanG Dream! multimedia franchise, which includes portraying the character Mutsumi Wakaba/Mortis.

== Biography ==
Yuzuki Watase, a native of Chiba Prefecture, was born on 18 February 2003.

In April 2020, Watase became part of Bushiroad's D4DJ franchise as Miiko Takeshita, one of the four members of Lyrical Lily; the same month, she and her Lyrical Lily co-star Ruka Fukagawa joined Bushiroad's talent agency Hibiki. She voiced the character in D4DJ Groovy Mix (2020), D4DJ Petit Mix (2021), and D4DJ All Mix (2023). She also reprised her role in the stage productions Senri! no Michi mo Ippo Kara and Arisugawa Gakuin Cultural Festival Live Stage.

In September 2023, the finale of BanG Dream! It's MyGO!!!!!, where she starred as Mortis/Mutsumi Wakaba, announced that she was a guitarist of the heretofore-anonymous BanG Dream! band Ave Mujica as said character. She reprised her role in the sequel BanG Dream! Ave Mujica.

She also voiced minor characters in D Cide Traumerei, Joran: The Princess of Snow and Blood, The Fruit of Evolution, The Great Cleric, and My Tiny Senpai. In video games, she also voices Auria in Quiz RPG: The World of Mystic Wiz and Iserin in Brown Dust. On 14 May 2021, she debuted at Korakuen Hall as a ring announcer for Bushiroad subsidiary World Wonder Ring Stardom.

== Filmography ==
=== Animated television ===
2021

- D4DJ Petit Mix, Miiko Takeshita
- D Cide Traumerei, Kazuha
- Joran: The Princess of Snow and Blood, boy
- The Fruit of Evolution, female student

2023

- BanG Dream! It's MyGO!!!!!, Mortis/Mutsumi Wakaba
- D4DJ All Mix, Miiko Takeshita
- The Great Cleric, adventurer
- My Tiny Senpai, girl C

2024

- Cardfight!! Vanguard DivineZ 2nd Season, Yuna Saionji

2025

- BanG Dream! Ave Mujica, Mortis/Mutsumi Wakaba

=== Video games ===
2020

- D4DJ Groovy Mix, Miiko Takeshita
- Quiz RPG: The World of Mystic Wiz, Auria

2021

- Assault Lily Last Bullet, injured Lily, etc.
- Brown Dust, Iserin

2026

- BanG Dream! Our Notes, Mortis/Mutsumi Wakaba

=== Stage ===
2020

- Shotō Kyōiku Royal, Yamamoto-san

2021

- Reading Party Vol. 10
- Hakoniwa Dōsōkai, Kaede Sasamori

2022

- Butai Lyrical Lily: Senri! no Michi mo Ippo Kara, Miiko Takeshita

2023

- Butai D4DJ: Arisugawa Gakuin Cultural Festival Live Stage, Miiko Takeshita
- Matching Appli: Apple Bomb (Kari), Kō
