= Mai (Vietnamese surname) =

Mai is a surname with Vietnamese origin. It is transliterated as Mei in Chinese and Mae in Korean but is very rare in Korea.

It is also the Chinese surname Mai which is transliterated as Mạch in Vietnamese.

== Notable people with the surname Mai ==
- Mai An Tiêm
- Mai Thúc Loan (Mai Hắc Đế), the Vietnamese leader of the 722 uprisings against the rule of the Tang dynasty in the region of Ái and Hoan provinces (now Thanh Hóa and Nghệ An of Vietnam)
- Mai Văn Cường, Mikoyan-Gurevich MiG-21 pilot of the Vietnamese People's Air Force
- Mai Huu Xuan, general of the Army of the Republic of Vietnam
- Mai Phương Thúy, Miss Viet Nam 2006
- Mai Tiến Thành, footballer
- Jeannie Mai, television personality
- Mai Đức Chung, football coach
- Mai Hồng Ngọc (Đông Nhi), Vietnamese female singer
