= May Tha Hla =

Daw May Tha Hla is an Anglo-Burmese psychologist and activist. She is co-founder of the NGO Helping The Burmese Delta (HTBD).

== Biography ==
May Tha Hla was born in Yangon, Myanmar. She left Myanmar with her family when she was aged 14 and settled in the UK.

May Tha Hla studied psychology at the University of Warwick. After graduating, she worked as a Prison Psychologist in HM Prison Service.

After the devastation of Clyclone Nargis in 2008, May Tha Hla raised money to provide food supplies and donated to relief organisers including senior monks, an orphanage and a medical team. May Tha Hla then co-founded of the NGO Helping The Burmese Delta (HTBD) with her husband Professor Jon Wilkinson, which works building elementary schools and providing access to safe drinking water in the remote Ayeyarwaddy division.

Tha Hla is also chairwoman of the Britain-Burma Society and is a trustee of the eTekkatho Foundation.

In 2023, May Tha Hla was named a BBC 100 Woman. May Tha Hla and her husband have also been honoured with the Points of Light award, awarded by British Prime Minister, Boris Johnson.
