= Akane Yonezawa =

Japanese drummer and voice actress

- 米澤 茜
- Born: December 31, 1998 (age 27); Tottori Prefecture, Japan
- Occupations: Drummer; voice actress
- Notable work: BanG Dream! as Amoris/Nyamu Yūtenji
- Musical career
- Member of: Ave Mujica
- Formerly of: Try Try Niiche

Akane Yonezawa (Japanese: 米澤 茜, Hepburn: Yonezawa Akane; Born December 31, 1998) is a Japanese rock/metal musician and voice actress. She was a member of Try Try Niiche and is currently the drummer for Japanese metal band Ave Mujica.

== Biography ==
Born on December 31, 1998 in the Tottori Prefecture, Yonezawa started taking drumming lessons while visiting the fourth year of elementary school. After she graduated from University she played drums in several bands as a hobby musician. To start a professional drumming career, Yonezawa moved to Tokyo.

Between March 2019 and November 2020, Yonezawa was an active member in Try Try Niiche, a Japanese pop-rock band where she played drums under the moniker Abanun. In 2023, she was cast for the character role Nyamu Yūtenji and became the drummer of Ave Mujica, a metal band belonging to the BanG Dream! media franchise. Her membership and the identities of the other band members were kept a secret until April 2023, while the members of the fictional group were announced on the day the thirteenth episode of BanG Dream! It's MyGO!!!!! aired on television. Yonezawa also voiced Margaret for the JRPG Progress Orders.

In November 2024, Yonezawa announced that she ended her contract with Platinum Pixel talent agency and would start working as a freelancer.

== Discography ==
=== Try Try Niiche ===
- 2019: Itsuka no Shōnen/Tsubomi (Single, self-released)

=== Ave Mujica ===
- see: Ave Mujica#Discography

== Filmography ==
=== Anime television ===
2023

- BanG Dream! It's MyGO!!!!! as Nyamu Yūtenji

2025

- BanG Dream! Ave Mujica as Amoris/Nyamu Yūtenji

=== Video games ===
2025

- Progress Orders as Margaret

2026

- BanG Dream! Our Notes as Amoris/Nyamu Yūtenji
