= Maij =

Maij is a Dutch surname. Notable people with the surname include:

- Hanja Maij-Weggen (born 1943), Dutch politician, mother of Hester and Marit
- Hester Maij, Dutch politician
- Marit Maij (born 1972), Dutch politician
