= Rico Sasaki =

Japanese voice actress (born 1997)

- 佐々木 李子
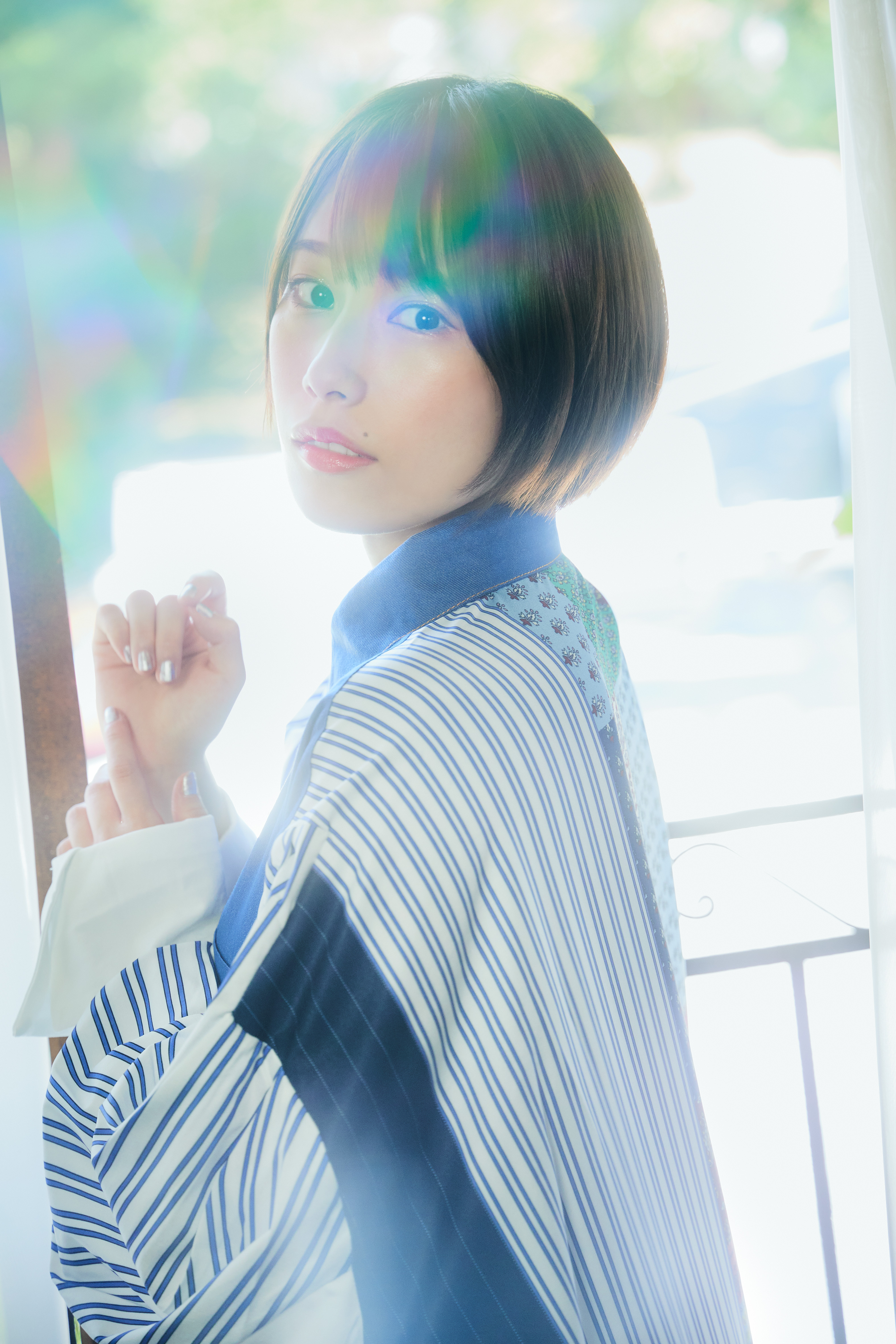
- Born: November 10, 1997 (age 28); Akita Prefecture, Japan
- Occupations: Actress; voice actress; singer
- Years active: 2008–present
- Agent: Honeycomb Entertainment
- Notable work: Kiratto Pri Chan as Daia Nijinosaki/Daia; Dropkick on My Devil! as Poporon; Kageki Shojo!! as Ayako Yamada; BanG Dream! as Doloris/Uika Misumi
- Website: sasakirico.com

Rico Sasaki (佐々木 李子, Sasaki Riko; born November 10, 1997) is a Japanese actress and singer who is affiliated with Honeycomb Entertainment. Her entertainment career began in 2008 when she was selected to play Annie in a musical production of Annie in 2008. She started a music career in 2014 under the stage name Rico, before reverting to using her real name in 2016. That same year, she started a voice acting career. As a voice actress, she is known for her roles as Poporon in Dropkick on My Devil!, Daia Nijinosaki/Daia in Kiratto Pri Chan, and Ayako Yamada in Kageki Shojo!!, while her music has been featured in anime series such as Danchi Tomoo, Duel Masters, and Bofuri. She is the vocalist and lead guitarist for the band Ave Mujica of the BanG Dream! multimedia franchise, which includes portraying the character Uika Misumi/Doloris.

== Biography ==
Sasaki was born in Akita Prefecture on November 10, 1997. She had an interest in music from an early age, partly under the influence of her grandmother, and she began taking voice lessons while in elementary school. While in her third year of elementary, she watched a Japanese production of the musical Annie, which inspired her to pursue a career in theater. Partly at the suggestion of her teacher, she auditioned for a role in Annie, and out of around 9,000 applicants, she was selected to play the titular role Annie; she began appearing in productions in late 2008.

In 2013, Sasaki launched a music career after winning a competition held by Teichiku Records as part of its 80th anniversary, beating 3,836 other applicants; she debuted under the stage name Rico. Her first single, "Come and Get It!", was released on July 23, 2014. That same year, she joined Honeycomb Entertainment.

Sasaki studied music at the Tokiwagi Gakuen High School in Sendai and graduated from the school in 2016. That same year, she started using her real name for entertainment activities and released the single "Kasabuta/Omoi no Kakera/Dream Climber" (カサブタ/想いのかけら/ドリームクライマー). She also started a voice acting career, a decision she originally made while still in junior high school at the urging of a friend and one of her agency's staff members. Among her early roles was as the character Nanami in the anime television series Clione no Akari.

In 2018, she formed the music duo Re-connect together with singer Kyoco; the duo was forced to suspend activities in 2019 after Kyoco's contract with her agency was terminated. Her song "Ashita e no Kaze" (明日への風), released on February 21 of that year, was used as an ending theme to the anime series Duel Masters. She was also cast as the character Poporon in the anime television series Dropkick on My Devil!. In 2019, she played the role of Daia Nijinosaki/Daia in Kiratto Pri Chan.

In 2020 Sasaki released the single "Play the world"; the title song was used as the ending theme to the anime series Bofuri. In 2021, she played the role of Ayako Yamada in the anime series Kageki Shojo!.

== Filmography ==
=== Anime ===
2016

- Crane Game Girls as Kyōko
- Cardfight!! Vanguard G as Boy 3
- Omoi no Kakera as Michiru
- All Out!! as Female student

2017

- Love Kome as Gurue
- Clione no Akari as Nanami Yukine

2018

- Dropkick on My Devil! as Poporon

2019

- Kiratto Pri Chan as Daia Nijinosaki/Daia

2020

- Love Live! Nijigasaki High School Idol Club as Student council secretary

2021

- Kageki Shojo!! as Ayako Yamada

2023

- World Dai Star as Chisa Sasuga
- BanG Dream! It's MyGO!!!!! as Uika Misumi
- The Seven Deadly Sins: Four Knights of the Apocalypse as Elba

2024

- Rinkai! as Tsutsuji Kurume

2025

- BanG Dream! Ave Mujica as Doloris/Uika Misumi
- Welcome to Japan, Ms. Elf! as Mewi
- Apocalypse Bringer Mynoghra as Emle

=== Video games ===
2020

- Death End Request 2 as Makoto Franper

2022

- Azure Striker Gunvolt 3 as Layla, Luxia
- Love Live! School Idol Festival All Stars as Uzuki Satō

2023

- World Dai Star: Yume no Stellarium as Chisa Sasuga
- BanG Dream! Girls Band Party! as Uika Misumi

2024

- Tokyo 7th Sisters as Alina Laisto
- Death End Request 2 as Makoto Franper
- Gunvolt Records Cychronicle as Luxia

2026

- Arknights: Endfield as Liino
- BanG Dream! Our Notes as Doloris/Uika Misumi

== Discography ==
=== Singles ===
As Rico Sasaki:

- "Kasabuta/Omoi no Kakera/Dream Climber" (カサブタ/想いのかけら/ドリームクライマー) (Release date: July 22, 2016)
- "Recollections" (Release date: June 21, 2017)
- "Ashita e no Kaze" (明日への風) (Release date: February 21, 2018)
- "Tsumugu Logic Music Selection Type A (Blooming!) (紡ロジック Music Selection【Type A】(Blooming!)) (Release date: January 9, 2019)
- "Tsumugu Logic Music Selection Type B (Freedom) (紡ロジック Music Selection【Type A】(Freedom)) (Release date: January 9, 2019)
- "Tsumugu Logic Music Selection Type C (Blooming!/Freedom) (紡ロジック Music Selection【Type A】(Blooming!/Freedom)) (Release date: January 9, 2019)
- "Curtain Cull o Yurashite" (カーテンコールを揺らして, Kātenkōru o yurashite) (Release date: November 20, 2019)
- "Play the world" (Release date: February 26, 2020)
- "Start!" (スタート!, Sutāto!) (Release date: November 10, 2020)
