= Meiko (given name) =

- Gender: Female

Origin
- Origin: Japanese
- Meaning: Different meanings depending on the kanji used

Other names
- Related names: Mei

Meiko (めいこ, メイコ) is a feminine Japanese given name.

== Written forms ==
Meiko can be written using different kanji characters and can mean:

- 芽子, "sprout, child"
- 芽心, "sprout, heart"
- 迷子, "lost child"
- 姪子, "niece"
- 盟子, "alliance, child"
- 明子, "bright, child"
- 明衣子, "bright, garment, child"
- 芽衣子, "sprout, garment, child"
- め以子, "compared with, child"

The name can also be written in hiragana or katakana.

== People ==
- Meiko Izawa (明子; born 1969), Japanese actress
- Meiko Kaji (芽衣子; born 1947), Japanese actress and singer
- Meiko Kanda (明子; born 1984), Japanese actress
- Meiko Karahashi (姪子; 1796–1881), great-grandmother of Emperor Shōwa
- Meiko Komichi (迷子), Japanese manga artist
- Meiko Nakahara (めいこ; born 1959), Japanese singer
- Meiko Satomura (明衣子; born 1979), Japanese professional wrestler
- Meiko Tanaka (盟子; born 1988), Japanese professional wrestler
- Meiko Yasuda (芽衣子; born 1982), Japanese former tarento

=== Fictional characters ===
- Meiko (メイコ), a humanoid persona for Yamaha Corporation's vocaloid singing synthesizer application
- Meiko Akizuki (茗子), a character in the manga and anime series Marmalade Boy
- Meiko Ashikawa (芽衣子), a character in the manga series Kurosaki-kun no Iinari ni Nante Naranai
- Meiko "Menma" Honma (芽衣子), a character in the 2011 Japanese anime series Anohana
- Meiko Inoue (芽衣子), a character in the manga series Solanin
- Meiko Mochizuki (芽心), a character in the Digimon Adventure tri.
- Meiko Nishikado (め以子), a character in the 2013 Asadora Gochisōsan
- Meiko Okamoto (メイコ), a character in the adventure game Detective Pikachu
- Meiko Otsuka (芽子), a character in the manga series Yamada-kun and the Seven Witches
- Meiko Shiraki (芽衣子), a character in the manga series Prison School
