= Mak (surname) =

麥 / 麦
- Language: Chinese

Origin
- Meaning: Wheat or barley
- Region of origin: China, esp. Guangdong

Mak is the Cantonese form of the Chinese surname Mai (麥), meaning wheat. It is commonly transliterated as Mak in Hong Kong, though other transliterations exist. "麥" is the standard character in both Traditional and Simplified scripts but 麦 is also a variant seen in both. According to a 2013 study, 麥 was the 200th most common surname, shared by 550,000 people or 0.041% of China's population, with Guangdong being the province with the most.

== Notable people ==
- Alan Mak, Hong Kong director
- Alan Mak, British politician
- Alice Mak, the Secretary for Home and Youth Affairs of Hong Kong
- Alice Mak, Chinese cartoonist and creator of McMug/McDull
- Juno Mak, Hong Kong singer
- Karl Maka, (Chinese: 麥嘉) Hong Kong film producer, director, actor, and presenter.
- Bow-sim Mark, (Chinese: 麥寶嬋) martial arts grandmaster, credited with popularizing the term “Wushu” outside of China, mother of martial arts film star Donnie Yen.
- Him Mark Lai, (Chinese: 麥禮謙) American historian and writer
- Teresa Mak, Hong Kong actress, known for the role of Fang Yi (方怡) in The Duke of Mount Deer
- Dennis Mak, Hong Kong singer
- Tak Wah Mak, Chinese Canadian award-winning researcher known for discovery of the T-cell receptor
- Evergreen Mak Cheung-ching, Hong Kong TVB actor
- Mai Yinghao (born Panyu District, Guangdong), Chinese archaeologist
- Prince Mak, singer
- Mak Chai-kwong, Former Secretary for Development of Hong Kong
- Mak Pak Shee, Singaporean politician

== See also ==
- Mai (name)
- Mai (disambiguation)
