= Alea Jacta Est (EP) =

2023 extended play by Ave Mujica

- Digital and standard edition cover

EP by Ave Mujica
- Released: September 13, 2023
- Genre: Symphonic metal; symphonic rock; video game music; anime song
- Length: 25:14
- Language: Japanese
- Label: Bushiroad Music

Ave Mujica chronology
Alea Jacta Est (2023)	Elements (2024)

Singles from Elements
- 1. "Black Birthday" Released: April 11, 2023; 2. "Two Moons" Released: April 17, 2023; 3. "Choir ‘S’ Choir" Released: April 24, 2023; 4. "Memento Mori" Released: May 8, 2023; 5. "Masquerade Rhapsody Request" Released: May 22, 2023

Alea Jacta Est (lit. "The die is cast"; stylized in sentence case) is the debut extended play by Japanese metal band Ave Mujica. It was released on September 13, 2023, by Bushiroad Music.

== Background ==
On April 11, 2023, Ave Mujica debuted with the digital release of their single Black Birthday. The formation of Ave Mujica was teased during the fourth concert of MyGO!!!!! two days prior the single's release. On June 4, 2023, the new started group held their first concert entitled Ave Mujica 0th LIVE「Primo die in scaena」 at Nakano Sun Plaza in Tokyo. During this concert, the names of the fictional band members were revealed, while the member's identities of the real-life group remained hidden. (Note: To ensure that the identities of the real-life band members were kept hidden, the group performed their first concerts with limited stage lights to keep their faces hidden and additionally wearing cloaks. The band members were officially announced after the airing of the 13th episode of BanG Dream! It's MyGO!!!!! on September 14, 2023.) After this concert, the release of the first mini album as well as the second concert were officially announced.

== Reception ==
NBT describe the band's sound as dark and emotional incorporating elements of symphonic rock and metal.

Writing for Sputnikmusic, SaiseiTunes declared BanG Dream! a personal guilty pleasure. While being ashamed to admit to have enjoyed the anime productions the reviewer denied being ashamed enjoying the musical outputs of the franchise. As by the time of reviewing Ave Mujica's debut EP the band had not received an in-anime story the writer was able to review Alea jacta est solely by the music without any in-universe context needed. According to SaiseiTunes, the overall sound of Ave Mujica sets itself apart sowewhat from Roselia by "generally being moodier and heavier." The riffs feel more metal-inspired and the choir-esque backing voices "offer a more eerie sound." The lyrics feel far more mature to any of the franchise's predecessors, with explicit references to blood, sensuality and even satanism present. Despite the praises, the reviewer noted that this band is still part of the BanG Dream! franchise which means Ave Mujica still fits within the idol-esque formula that previous bands had established.

The EP's last song, Ave Mujica, was listed as bonus song on JRock News's Top 25 anime opening and ending songs list of 2023.

== Commercial performance ==
Alea jacta est sold approximately 4.300 within the first week after the release, resulting the EP to rank at no. 14 in the official Albums Charts published by Oricon.

== Track listing ==
All lyrics are written by Diggy-MO', except where noted

Alea jacta est track listing
No.	Title	Lyrics	Music	Arrangement	Length
1.	"Black Birthday (黒のバースデイ, Kuro no Birthday)"		Gasa Yasuhiro	Gasa Yasuhiro	3:46
2.	"Two Moons (ふたつの月 ~Deep Into The Forest~, Futatsu no Tsuki ~Deep Into The Forest~)"		Daisuke Hasegawa	Daisuke Hasegawa	4:56
3.	"Choir ‘S’ Choir"		Mai Kakumoto	Mai Kakumoto	4:38
4.	"Memento Mori (神さま、バカ, Kamisama, Baka)"		Takahito Makishima	Takahito Makishima	3:34
5.	"Masquerade Rhapsody Request"		Araken	Araken	4:02
6.	"Ave Mujica"	Asuka Oda; Noriyasu Agematsu	Noriyasu Agematsu	Hitoshi Fujima	4:15
Total length:					25:15

=== Notes ===
- "Masquerade Rhapsody Request" is stylized as Mas?uerade Rhapsody Re?uest.

== Charts ==
Chart (2025)	Peak position
Japanese Albums (Oricon)	14
Japanese Combined Albums (Oricon)	17
Japanese Anime Albums (Oricon)	4
Japanese Rock Albums (Oricon)	3
Japanese Hot Albums (Billboard Japan)	14
Top Albums Sales (Billboard Japan)	13
Download Albums (Billboard Japan)	20
