= Mei Okada =

Japanese singer and voice actress

- 岡田 夢以
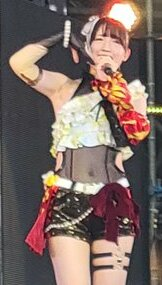
- Okada, performing with Merm4id in 2022
- Born: 19 May 1996 (age 30)
- Occupations: Singer; voice actress
- Employer: Ace Crew Entertainment
- Notable work: D4DJ as Marika Mizushima; BanG Dream! as Timoris/Umiri Yahata
- Musical career
- Member of: Merm4id; Ave Mujica
- Formerly of: Tenkou Shoujo

Mei Okada (Japanese: 岡田 夢以, Hepburn: Okada Mei; born 19 May 1996) is a Japanese singer and voice actress from Fukaya, Saitama, affiliated with Ace Crew Entertainment. She was the leader of the Japanese idol group Tenkou Shoujo from its formation in 2014 until 2019, and she portrays Marika Mizushima as part of Merm4id, one of the musical groups in Bushiroad's D4DJ franchise. She is the bass guitarist for the band Ave Mujica of the BanG Dream! multimedia franchise, which includes portraying the character Umiri Yahata/Timoris.

== Biography ==
Mei Okada, a native of Fukaya, Saitama, was born on 19 May 1996. In November 2014, she became the founding leader of the Japanese idol group Tenkou Shoujo. In September 2019, she announced that she would leave Tenkou Shoujo after their 2019 nationwide tour. On 16 November 2019, she had her final performance with Tenkou Shoujo at the tour's closing performance at Shibuya Public Hall in Shibuya, Tokyo. In 2016, she began "Mei Nadeshiko" (夢詠撫子, Mei Nadeshiko), a series of solo readings she hosts.

In July 2019, she became part of the D4DJ franchise as Marika Mizushima, one of four members of Merm4id. She voiced the character in D4DJ Groovy Mix (2020), D4DJ Petit Mix (2021), and D4DJ All Mix (2023). In October 2020, she was cast as Sara Hiiragi in Bushiroad's Road59 multimedia franchise.

In September 2023, the finale of BanG Dream! It's MyGO!!!!!, where she starred as Timoris/Umiri Yahata, announced that she was a bass guitarist of the heretofore-anonymous BanG Dream! band Ave Mujica as said character. She would later reprise her role in the sequel BanG Dream! Ave Mujica. Prior to becoming part of the franchise, her experience with musical instruments was initially limited to elementary school piano lessons, but she decided to learn bass guitar in the preceding months.

Okada has two sisters.

== Filmography ==
=== Anime television ===
2023

- D4DJ All Mix, Marika Mizushima
- BanG Dream! It's MyGO!!!!!, Timoris/Umiri Yahata

2025

- BanG Dream! Ave Mujica, Timoris/Umiri Yahata

=== Original net animation ===
2021

- D4DJ Petit Mix, Marika Mizushima

=== Video games ===
2020

- D4DJ Groovy Mix, Marika Mizushima

2025

- ROAD59: A Yakuza's Last Stand, Hiiragi Sara

2026

- BanG Dream! Our Notes, Timoris/Umiri Yahata
