= Mai (Arabic name) =

Mai (also spelled May, Arabic: مي, IPA: [maj]) is a feminine Arabic given name. It may refer to:

- Mai al-Kaila, incumbent Health Minister of Palestine
- Mai Ghoussoub, Lebanese writer
- May Hariri, Lebanese singer
- Mai Selim, Jordanian singer
- Mai Yamani, Saudi scholar
- May Ziadeh, Lebanese poet, essayist and translator
