= BanG Dream! Ave Mujica =

Japanese anime television series

- Key visual featuring the members of Ave Mujica. Clockwise from back: Sakiko Togawa, Mutsumi Wakaba, Uika Misumi (front), Umiri Yahata, and Nyamu Yūtenji
- Genre: Drama; Psychological thriller
- Created by: Bushiroad
- Anime television series
- Directed by: Kōdai Kakimoto
- Written by: Yuniko Ayana
- Music by: Elements Garden
- Studio: Sanzigen
- Licensed by: Crunchyroll; SEA: Muse Communication
- Original network: Tokyo MX, KBS, SUN, BS NTV, TV Aichi, TV Setouchi, SBS, ANN, HTV, AT-X
- Original run: January 2, 2025 – March 27, 2025
- Episodes: 13
- Manga

BanG Dream! Ave Mujica -manuscriptus-
- Written by: Pinfu Hiroyama
- Published by: Bushiroad
- Magazine: Comic Growl
- Original run: January 10, 2025 – March 19, 2026
- Volumes: 3
- Anime film

BanG Dream! Ave Mujica prima aurora
- Directed by: Kōdai Kakimoto
- Written by: Akiko Waba; Midori Gotō
- Music by: Elements Garden
- Studio: Nichicaline
- Released: October 16, 2026
- Runtime: 57 minutes
- Anime television series

BanG Dream! MyGO!!!!! // Ave Mujica
- Original network: NNS (Nippon TV)
- Original run: January 8, 2027 – scheduled
- icon

BanG Dream! Ave Mujica, also known as Ave Mujica - The Die is Cast -, is a Japanese anime television series created by Bushiroad and produced by Sanzigen. It is a spin-off of the main BanG Dream! anime series, serving as the direct sequel to BanG Dream! It's MyGO!!!!!. The series aired from January to March 2025. A manga adaptation written and illustrated by Pinfu Hiroyama, titled BanG Dream! Ave Mujica -manuscriptus-, was serialized in Bushiroad's magazine Comic Growl from January 2025 to March 2026.

A sequel to both Ave Mujica and It's MyGO!!!!!, titled BanG Dream! MyGO!!!!! // Ave Mujica, is set to premiere in January 2027. An anime film produced by Nichicaline, titled BanG Dream! Ave Mujica prima aurora, was released in October 2026.

== Premise ==
The series follows the exploits of the titular band Ave Mujica, one of two bands, along with MyGO!!!!!, that were founded following the breakup of the band Crychic. Although Ave Mujica enjoys a growth in popularity after several successful concerts, leader Sakiko Togawa sternly continues to demand the members to follow her vision for the band in an attempt to completely forget her traumatic past, causing clashes within the band that spiral into each member's ulterior motives, insecurities, secrets, and traumas being brought to light.

== Characters ==
=== Ave Mujica ===
Sakiko Togawa (豊川 祥子, Togawa Sakiko) / Oblivionis (オブリビオニス, Oburibionisu)
Voiced by: Kanon Takao
The stern keyboardist and leader of the band, who refers to her band persona as "the one who does not fear being forgotten." A first-year at Haneoka Girls' Academy and a former member of Crychic who currently lives in poverty with her disgraced father. She founded Ave Mujica following Crychic's breakup and after watching former bandmates Tomori, Soyo, and Taki perform their song "Haruhikage" (春日影; lit. "Spring Sunlight") with the band that would become MyGO!!!!!, and strives for the band to succeed through following her vision.
Director Kōdai Kakimoto described Sakiko as wishing to forget her emotional pain following Crychic's dissolution, leading her to form Ave Mujica and mask her feelings with the Oblivionis persona, although he also commented that she is unable to truly forget as she continues to pursue music under her new identity despite her previous failure.
Mutsumi Wakaba (若葉 睦, Wakaba Mutsumi) / Mortis (モーティス, Mōtisu)
Voiced by: Yuzuki Watase
The soft-spoken rhythm guitarist of the band, who refers to her band persona as "the one who does not fear death." A first-year at Tsukinomori Girls' Academy and another former member of Crychic who is the daughter of nationally renowned celebrities, she has been Sakiko's closest friend since childhood and Crychic's breakup, being the only person who knows Sakiko's situation, and tries to support her vision. Partway through the series, Mutsumi is revealed to have dissociative identity disorder. Her alter, Mortis, is more social than Mutsumi. Taking on the role of Mutsumi's protector, Mortis intervenes in Ave Mujica to keep Mutsumi from suffering any further mental trauma.
Throughout the events of the series, Mutsumi and Mortis come into conflict in their mental world before reconciling and appearing to vanish together. In an interview in Megami Magazine, Kakimoto explained this development as them ceasing to exist as the core host personalities, and that by the end of the anime, their physical body is being controlled not by any particular identity, but rather by their many alternate "roles" (represented by an audience in their mental world) who are switching in and out of control as needed for any given situation. Mortis is seen smiling in their reflection at the end of the series finale, which Kakimoto stated was intended to indicate that her identity still lingered among the "roles", and also to satisfy his "parental" desire to see Mortis in some sense bow onstage with the rest of Ave Mujica at their curtain call.
Umiri Yahata (八幡 海鈴, Yahata Umiri) / Timoris (ティモリス, Timorisu)
Voiced by: Mei Okada
The stoic bassist of the band, who refers to her band persona as "the one who does not fear being afraid." A first-year at Hanasakigawa Girls' Academy and a close friend of Taki, she is a session musician working for numerous bands and keeps a level of professionalism within Ave Mujica and emotional distance from the band, merely seeing Ave Mujica as one of her gigs. It is later revealed that her emotionally distant behavior originates from her first band abandoning her due to her meddling, despite Umiri believing she was helping them.
Uika Misumi (三角 初華, Misumi Uika) / Doloris (ドロリス, Dororisu)
Voiced by: Rico Sasaki
The kindhearted lead guitarist and vocalist of the band, who is also a member of the idol unit sumimi and refers to her band persona as "the one who does not fear sorrow." A first-year at Hanasakigawa Girls' Academy and another childhood friend of Sakiko, she expresses gratitude and admiration towards her on being invited to Ave Mujica and dedicates herself to be by Sakiko's side whenever possible. Director Kōdai Kakimoto said the intent of Uika's characterization was to portray her as someone "shackled down" and defined by her facade, as she suppresses her true emotions throughout the story.
Nyamu Yūtenji (祐天寺 にゃむ, Yūtenji Nyamu) / Amoris (アモーリス, Amōrisu)
Voiced by: Akane Yonezawa
The attention-seeking drummer of the band, who refers to her band persona as "the one who does not fear love." She is a popular online influencer who aims to gain fame and recognition for the band and herself by any means necessary, and she clashes with Sakiko on the direction of Ave Mujica. She also constantly compares herself to the natural talent of Mutsumi, much to her own detriment.

=== MyGO!!!!! ===
Tomori Takamatsu (高松 燈, Takamatsu Tomori)
Voiced by: Hina Yōmiya
The vocalist of the band. A first-year at Haneoka Girls' Academy and another former member of Crychic, she continuously attempts to reach out to Sakiko after sensing her personal struggles, despite Sakiko rejecting her advances.
Anon Chihaya (千早 愛音, Chihaya Anon)
Voiced by: Rin Tateishi
The rhythm guitarist and leader of the band. A first-year at Haneoka Girls' Academy and a close friend of Tomori, she assists her in reaching out to Sakiko regarding her struggles.
Rāna Kaname (要 楽奈, Kaname Rāna)
Voiced by: Hina Aoki
The lead guitarist of the band, known for her exceptional skill at the instrument. A third-year at the middle school branch of Hanasakigawa Girls' Academy who is eccentric and often acts on her own accord. Rāna immediately recognizes Mortis and Mutsumi as two people sharing a body upon meeting them, and befriends Mortis.
Soyo Nagasaki (長崎 そよ, Nagasaki Soyo)
Voiced by: Mika Kohinata
The bassist of the band. A first-year at Tsukinomori Girls' Academy and another former member of Crychic, she continues to remember the band even with its complicated breakup and also worries for Mutsumi and Sakiko's wellbeing, despite her prior animosities towards Mutsumi and her role in Crychic's breakup.
Taki Shiina (椎名 立希, Shiina Taki)
Voiced by: Coco Hayashi
The drummer of the band. A first-year at Hanasakigawa Girls' Academy and another former member of Crychic, she holds contempt towards Sakiko on her sudden departure from the band though she worries for her, and is close friends with Umiri.

=== Other characters ===
Mana Sumita (純田 まな, Sumita Mana)
Voiced by: Hazuki Tanda
The vocalist and bandmate of Uika in the idol unit sumimi.
Kiyotsugu Togawa (豊川 清告, Togawa Kiyotsugu)
Voiced by: Atsushi Kisaichi
The father of Sakiko and son-in-law of Sadaharu, who was disowned by the Togawa family following his involvement in a fraud case.
Sadaharu Togawa (豊川 定治, Togawa Sadaharu)
Voiced by: Masaki Terasoma
The grandfather of Sakiko and leader of the Togawa Group conglomerate.
Minami Mori (森 みなみ, Mori Minami)
Voiced by: Miyuki Sawashiro
An acclaimed actress and the mother of Mutsumi.

== Production ==
Director Kōdai Kakimoto shared in interviews that MyGO!!!!! and Ave Mujica were conceptualized at the same time and intended to be created as polar opposites to each other, which guided the production team to highlight their contrasts and Ave Mujica's formation behind the scenes during the airing of It's MyGO!!!!! while Ave Mujica was in production. As the story was being written, and with the story of It's MyGO!!!!! wrapping up, this also led the team towards the decision to structure its thirteenth and final episode as the pilot to Ave Mujica. Kakimoto further elaborated on the two anime being polar opposites, in that while It's MyGO!!!!! was a youth drama where its members express their raw emotions and perform in simple live houses, Ave Mujica in comparison is a psychological suspense story where its members conceal their emotions behind masks as they conduct operatic performances in theaters.

Kakimoto added that in order to distinguish Ave Mujica from the franchise's existing gothic band Roselia, the production team incorporated elements inspired by circuses, freak shows, and theater. He also addressed how the series would break away from BanG Dream!'s established conventions of showcasing the trust and bond between band members as they tackle the negative yet real emotions and inner turmoil faced by each member of Ave Mujica, saying the team is "well aware that this approach may not resonate with all audiences." Despite this, they remained steadfast in portraying the characters' emotions and actions without compromise. By his own admission, the team initially thought of avoiding this contradiction by placing MyGO!!!!! and Ave Mujica in a separate brand from the franchise. As this idea was eventually abandoned, Kakimoto and the team decided to draw some boundaries between the new and old bands, leaving some connections so as not to ruin the image of the old groups and allowing the two bands to establish their own identity, while maintaining the necessary continuity.

In an interview, Kanon Takao and Yuzuki Watase commented on the dubbing process, saying it was challenging due to the heavy emotional nature of the anime's scenes, but characterized their experience as positive for their development as actors. Takao noted a scene in the first episode in which Sakiko cries, which she said "took the best parts out of a very long recording of me wailing", and also commented on the experience of recording dialogue for a plot twist late in the series, the details of which were kept from her prior to the recording so as to elicit a genuine vocal reaction.

According to studio president Hiroaki Matsuura, the monologue scene in episode 11 was created with the assistance of real stage actor Keina Kiriyama. The animation production team set up five cameras in the studio to record Kiriyama's physical performance. Matsuura highly praised Kiriyama's thorough understanding of the script and her outstanding acting, noting that this collaborative approach also presented a challenging production method for Sanzigen.

== Themes and analysis ==
Centering around Ave Mujica, a dysfunctional girl band, the plot of Ave Mujica is driven by character more than music. The series touches upon themes like alcoholism, abandonment, split personality, and anxiety. Kakimoto said that the story of Ave Mujica incorporated psychological themes such as serial killers, dissociative identity disorder and Munchausen syndrome, comparing the psychological elements to another production he had previously participated in at Sanzigen, Arpeggio of Blue Steel: Ars Nova.

Takaaki Kidani, CEO and president of Bushiroad, in response to criticism of the supposed senselessness and illogicality of the characters' behavior in the 10th episode, wrote on Twitter that people always tend to search for logic in fate, but in his personal opinion the anime Ave Mujica completely denies this. Christopher Farris of Anime News Network considered that duality has always been a central motif with Ave Mujica, both in how it interfaces with itself and the full tome it shares with It's MyGO!!!!!.

Yota Tokuda from Real Sound described the initial conflicts in the series with the clash between Sakiko's auteurism and Nyamu's commercialism and the stress of working in the entertainment industry being conventional themes within musical fiction, citing Girls Band Cry and Trapezium as comparative examples. However, he notes how the series subverts these themes within the context of the band anime genre, such as Nyamu unmasking the band and the introduction of Mortis. Sakiko fails to reunite Crychic and return to everyday life, strongly distinguishing Ave Mujica's story both from past narratives in BanG Dream! and other music-themed anime in general. Tokuda further notes that Uika Misumi's obsessive tendencies and unusually twisted nature, particularly her contemplation of violence in episode 9 (and the explicit visual depiction of her acting out this thought while not actually having it happen), allows the series to push into darker territory while respecting the commercial considerations of its genre and target demographic.

== Media ==
=== Anime ===
Following the release of the final episode of It's MyGO!!!!! on September 14, 2023, an anime television series centered around Ave Mujica that serves as its direct sequel was announced. It is produced by Sanzigen and much of the team behind It's MyGO!!!!! returned for the sequel, with Kōdai Kakimoto as director, and Yuniko Ayana writing and supervising series scripts. It aired from January 2 to March 27, 2025, on Tokyo MX and other networks. The opening theme is "Killkiss", (Note: Stylized as "KiLLKiSS") while the ending theme is "Georgette Me, Georgette You", both performed by the eponymous band. Crunchyroll licensed the series outside of Asia under the title Ave Mujica - The Die is Cast -. Muse Communication licensed the series in Southeast Asia.

==== Episodes ====
No.	Title (Note: All translated English titles are taken from Muse Asia.)	Directed by	Written by	Storyboarded by	Original release date
1	"Sub rosa." (English: Under the Rose.)	Kōichirō Koga	Midori Gotō & Yuniko Ayana	Naoya Okugawa	January 2, 2025 (Note: This episode held a simultaneous global debut in both Tokyo and at Anime Festival Asia in Singapore on December 1, 2024.)
While Ave Mujica is growing in popularity, Nyamu Yūtenji suggests they unmask themselves so as to leverage their identities for further growth. Sakiko Togawa shoots her proposal down and insists they will unmask at the right time, irritating Nyamu. Uika Misumi expresses her gratitude to Sakiko for inviting her to the band, before Sakiko is interrupted by a call from the police, who have detained her father Kiyotsugu for public intoxication. She leaves to retrieve him, recalling on how she formed Crychic after watching Morfonica perform during middle school. However, after her mother died from an illness, her wealthy grandfather Sadaharu expelled Kiyotsugu from the Togawa family, prompting Sakiko to leave the family to support Kiyotsugu, forsaking her family's wealth and forcing her to quit Crychic. Before leaving for Ave Mujica's Nippon Budokan debut, Kiyotsugu expresses guilt for causing pain and lashes out at Sakiko, leading her to disown him. At the Budokan, Nyamu, fed up with maintaining anonymity, reveals herself and unmasks Mutsumi Wakaba and Umiri Yahata against their will. Under pressure, Sakiko and Uika follow suit, shocking MyGO!!!!! members Anon Chihaya and Soyo Nagasaki, who earlier came to attend the concert together.
2	"Exitus acta probat." (English: The Outcome Justifies the Deed.)	Daisuke Suzuki	Akiko Waba	Tomomi Umetsu	January 9, 2025
In the aftermath of Ave Mujica receiving media attention, MyGO!!!!! discusses their identities. Tomori Takamatsu expresses concern for Sakiko, saying she no longer recognizes her in Ave Mujica's performances. Sakiko is furious at Nyamu prematurely exposing them, while Mutsumi is left traumatized due to her status as a child of entertainer parents being publicized. Nyamu uses Mutsumi's fame to gain acting connections with her mother Minami Mori, further distressing Mutsumi. Despite their unmasking, the band presses on and gives interviews to promote their upcoming tour, during which a dissociated Mutsumi impulsively states that the band "won't last long." Mutsumi's comment prompts rumors of the band's disbandment, leading Nyamu and Sakiko to chastise her as she becomes strained by her work. Meanwhile, Uika invites Sakiko to stay in her apartment. At the first concert of their tour, an overwhelmed Mutsumi suffers a panic attack and collapses midperformance, bewildering the audience and stunning her bandmates.
3	"Quid faciam?" (English: What Can I Do?)	Hajime Yamanokuchi	Hitomi Ogawa	Kozue Oka	January 16, 2025
Sakiko improvises a narration framing Mutsumi's collapse to be part of the show, as no one recognizes that Mutsumi was not acting. Mutsumi later hallucinates a play hosted by her band persona "Mortis," reflecting on her feelings of being overshadowed by her parents and guilt for breaking up Crychic. Envious of Mutsumi's popularity after her "performance," Nyamu proposes they leave Ave Mujica and perform together instead, though Mutsumi refuses out of concern for Sakiko. The band discusses concert plans, where Umiri mentions they received requests for Mutsumi to replicate her collapse. Sakiko rebuffs the idea, and a distressed Mutsumi hesitates to respond. Mortis points out that committing to Ave Mujica for Sakiko's sake, while sacrificing her own mental health, is untenable. The audience is disappointed when Mutsumi does not reproduce her collapse at a concert in Sendai, leading the band to further argue and trouble Mutsumi, who is reminded of Crychic's breakup. After Sakiko lashes out at Mutsumi for the difficulty her behavior has caused, Mortis takes over Mutsumi's body to protect her, repressing her identity during a televised live performance.
4	"Acta est fabula." (English: The Play is Over.)	Hiroshi Morita	Midori Gotō	Hiroshi Morita	January 23, 2025
Mortis, performing in Mutsumi's stead, becomes a success with the audience, leading to Ave Mujica's morale and public image improving. Umiri, Nyamu, and Uika are pleased with Mutsumi's more social demeanor. However, Sakiko grows frustrated over losing control of Ave Mujica and becomes uncomfortable with Mutsumi's change in attitude. As Uika worries for Sakiko's uneasiness, Mortis passes the responsibility of taking care of Sakiko to Uika, much to the latter's surprise and delight. During a rehearsal for a concert in Fukuoka, Mortis says she is unable to play the guitar, startling the band. Mortis reveals herself to Sakiko privately and tells her of her contribution to Mutsumi's distress, threatening to fully repress Mutsumi's identity if Sakiko does not change her behavior. A horrified Sakiko fills in the rest of the band, and Mortis joins them to discuss their future plans. Nyamu expresses displeasure at the band's state, while Sakiko is upset at Mutsumi's disappearance. Mortis insists she can learn to play guitar and that the band can stay together, but the others remain unconvinced. Ave Mujica reluctantly announces their disbandment, leaving Mortis devastated.
5	"Facta fugis, facienda petis." (English: You Avoid the Past but Pursue the Future.)	Daichi Ōmori	Tani Haruhi	Daichi Ōmori & Daisuke Suzuki	January 30, 2025
Ave Mujica splits up and the band members become distant. Despite Uika promising to stay by a despondent Sakiko's side, Sakiko moves out of Uika's apartment and cuts all contact to move back with Kiyotsugu, leaving Uika in despair. One month later, Sadaharu instructs Sakiko to return to the Togawa mansion, and she complies. Nyamu attempts to increase her profile as an influencer, but remains insecure of feeling inferior to Mortis' talent. Meanwhile, Tomori looks back on her time in Crychic, and Sakiko's parting words wishing her happiness. Tomori leaves a note inside Sakiko's locker asking if she is happy; when Sakiko sees the note, she cries and crumples it. Tomori and Anon see the note and follow Sakiko to the Togawa mansion. After seeing the piano where they bonded over music, Tomori asks Sakiko to play music together again. Meanwhile, Soyo visits Mutsumi's house after hearing rumors of her disappearance and noticing her absence from school. Soyo is shocked to find an anguished Mortis in Mutsumi's unkempt bedroom, having been unable to restore Mutsumi's identity. Mortis begs Soyo to help her reawaken Mutsumi.
6	"Animum reges." (English: Keep Your Emotions in Check.)	Kōichirō Koga	Akiko Waba	Naoya Okugawa	February 6, 2025
Sakiko coldly rejects Tomori's offer, saddening Tomori. At Mutsumi's house, Mortis tells Soyo of her grudge against Sakiko and her desire to revive Ave Mujica by reawakening Mutsumi. Soyo takes Mortis to MyGO!!!!!, where Rāna Kaname recognizes Mutsumi's two identities. As Soyo explains the situation, Mortis and Rāna bond. Taki Shiina confronts Umiri about Ave Mujica's breakup and asks if she really cared for them, displeasing Umiri. Mortis and Rāna meet MyGO!!!!! at RiNG, where Rāna plays her guitar. Mutsumi reawakens to Mortis' delight, but Mutsumi is disturbed by the fallout of Mortis' interventions. She attempts to retake control, conflicting with Mortis' plans in having Mutsumi only play guitar. The two argue as they visibly break down outside RiNG and are filmed by a crowd, who mistake it for an Ave Mujica publicity stunt. Their breakdown subsequently goes viral; Sakiko sees it and is horrified, believing herself responsible. Tomori and Anon try to reassure Sakiko, but she denies having knowledge about Mutsumi, Crychic, or Ave Mujica. Against Mutsumi's wishes, Mortis tells Soyo the address of Kiyotsugu's home. Soyo visits the home and discovers Sakiko's reasons for quitting Crychic. After Soyo shares her findings to MyGO!!!!!, Anon relays Sakiko's remarks, which upsets Soyo.
7	"Post nubila Phoebus." (English: After the Clouds, the Sun.)	Daisuke Suzuki	Hitomi Ogawa	Kozue Oka	February 13, 2025
Soyo confronts Sakiko at Haneoka and drags her to Mutsumi's house to make amends. However, Mortis refuses to let Sakiko see Mutsumi. Despite Mortis' protests, Sakiko continues to wait. Mutsumi and Mortis wrestle for control in speaking with Sakiko, during which Mortis sees Sakiko's genuine care for Mutsumi. Taki and Soyo later join Sakiko and reflect on Crychic's breakup. Taki recalls Mutsumi's comment of never enjoying the band, and Sakiko tells them Mutsumi was, in truth, unhappy with her guitar skills, and that Crychic was important to her. Hearing this, Mortis lets Mutsumi take control, allowing the girls to reconcile. They later travel to RiNG as Tomori presents to MyGO!!!!!, Sakiko, and Mutsumi a revision of the lyrics Sakiko composed when she and Tomori first met. Anon encourages the former Crychic members to perform one last time as a band and they play Tomori's song and "Haruhikage", allowing the group to find closure and move forward from their trauma. Sakiko and Mutsumi leave and encounter a jealous Umiri, who watched their reunion and asks them to join her in reforming Ave Mujica.
8	"Belua multorum es capitums." (English: You Are a Many-Headed Beast.)	Hiroshi Morita	Midori Gotō	Hiroshi Morita	February 20, 2025
Umiri discloses to Taki that Sakiko and Mutsumi declined her plea to reform Ave Mujica. Taki points out Umiri's unreliability, shocking her. Sakiko and Mutsumi hang out and Mutsumi expresses wanting to revive Crychic. Mortis takes control and demands Sakiko to explain to Mutsumi that Crychic has already disbanded, while adding that the Mutsumi Sakiko knew never truly existed and insisting on reforming Ave Mujica in order for Mortis to survive. Sakiko and Nyamu separately learn about Mutsumi's condition in their conversations with Mortis and Minami respectively, and Nyamu becomes appalled at Minami's neglect. Mortis and Mutsumi argue as Mutsumi insists she no longer needs Mortis. Meanwhile, Umiri, bothered by Taki's words, meets with Nyamu to discuss reforming the band. Umiri explains that her desire of wanting to belong to a band was rooted from her first band abandoning her. Nyamu hesitantly considers her invitation on the condition that Umiri convinces Mutsumi to come back to Ave Mujica. Umiri meets with Mortis and trains her on the guitar. At Hanasakigawa, Uika learns of Crychic's reunion after seeing the aftermath of their performance.
9	"Ne vivam si abis." (English: May I Not Live if You Go.)	Daichi Ōmori	Akiko Waba	Tomomi Umetsu	February 27, 2025
Sakiko, wanting to atone for neglecting Mutsumi, asks Anon and Tomori to revive Crychic. Anon is confronted by Uika, where Anon divulges Sakiko's recent desire. Uika desperately asks her agency to reform Ave Mujica but is refused. Meanwhile, Nyamu faces a decline in popularity. Umiri reiterates her invitation, though Nyamu remains distrustful and rejects Umiri. Mutsumi and Tomori encounter Uika, and Mutsumi reveals that Sakiko formed Ave Mujica as a response to Crychic's breakup. An enraged Uika contemplates harming Mutsumi, but becomes terrified by the thought and leaves in distress. While Mutsumi tries to convince Tomori to support Crychic, Mortis fights with her in their mental world and accidentally completely represses Mutsumi's identity, "killing" her. MyGO!!!!! and Ave Mujica later congregate at RiNG, disputing the issue of reviving either Crychic or Ave Mujica. Sakiko insists on Crychic but Soyo declares they cannot revert the past, while Umiri tearfully pleads for Ave Mujica. Mortis fears she may disappear, so she impersonates Mutsumi in an attempt to survive and sway Sakiko's opinion. However, Rāna and Nyamu deduce her motives.
10	"Odi et amo." (English: I Hate and I Love.)	Kōichirō Koga	Tani Haruhi	Naoya Okugawa	March 6, 2025
Nyamu exposes Mortis' charade, driving Mortis to tears and forcing MyGO!!!!! to ease tensions. Sakiko is left distraught with Mutsumi's loss, and she storms out of RiNG after Nyamu and Uika press her about reforming Ave Mujica. Afraid she will lose Sakiko, Uika writes lyrics about her. Nyamu sends Uika's lyrics to the band and takes her to the Togawa mansion. Nyamu pressures Sakiko to reform Ave Mujica and calls out her hypocrisy and poor leadership, adding that Ave Mujica is the only remaining motivation the members have before leaving with Uika. Faced with Nyamu's words and her own actions, Sakiko reluctantly composes Uika's lyrics and proclaims that she will revive Ave Mujica, much to Uika and Umiri's delight. At their reunion show at RiNG, Uika devotes herself to an indifferent Sakiko, and Nyamu confesses to Mortis that despite her jealousy of her and Mutsumi's acting talents, she loves and admires her. Ave Mujica begins their set, during which Mortis reconciles with Mutsumi's identity in their mental world before they both vanish. Although their show is met with success, Uika and Sakiko are later confronted by Sadaharu. He addresses Uika as "Hatsune" and asks her to leave, discomforting the latter and shocking Sakiko.
11	"Te ustus amem." (English: I Love You Until I Turn to Ashes.)	Hajime Yamanokuchi	Midori Gotō	Hajime Yamanokuchi, Kozue Oka, & Kōdai Kakimoto	March 13, 2025
"Uika", performing a soliloquy for much of the episode, admits she is Hatsune Misumi, the illegitimate daughter of Sadaharu and a caretaker of the Togawa villa in Shōdoshima. Hatsune was raised by her foster father, as her mother realized the affair may cause Sadaharu to be disowned. Hatsune gained a younger identical half-sister named Uika, though Hatsune remained miserable. Sakiko, Hatsune's niece, visited the island and played with Uika, while Hatsune was forbidden to meet her. When Uika fell ill, Hatsune impersonated her and spent time with Sakiko, forming a deep affection that turned into a strong obsessive attachment. After Sakiko left, Hatsune's foster father died, and Uika condemned Hatsune on lacking empathy to their father's death and deceiving Sakiko. Hatsune ran away to Tokyo, where she would join sumimi and assume Uika's identity. Hatsune asked Kiyotsugu to help her reconnect with Sakiko. Kiyotsugu met with Sadaharu to acknowledge Hatsune's existence, but Sadaharu demanded he remain silent. After Kiyotsugu's disgrace, Hatsune blamed herself for worsening Sakiko's pain. In the present, Sadaharu instructs Sakiko to leave for Switzerland and never contact Hatsune again. Sakiko learns from Ave Mujica that Hatsune did not arrive for practice, and Hatsune returns to Shōdoshima.
12	"Fluctuat nec mergitur." (English: Tossed by the Waves but Does Not Sink.)	Daichi Ōmori	Yuniko Ayana	Kozue Oka	March 20, 2025
Sakiko reflects on her lack of agency under Sadaharu, so she disobeys him and travels to Shōdoshima. She finds Hatsune tending to the villa. Hatsune confesses her true identity and apologizes for deceiving Sakiko. Despite Hatsune's guilt, Sakiko states they should not be tied down by their past, as they return to Tokyo. They sneak into the Togawa mansion to retrieve Sakiko's belongings, when Sadaharu again demands that Hatsune cut ties with the Togawa family. Sakiko denounces Sadaharu on his fear of losing status and leaves him to move in with Hatsune. Sakiko and Hatsune return to band activities with Ave Mujica, with Sakiko keeping Hatsune's secret while her public identity as Uika is maintained. Sakiko reflects on the uncertainty of life, giving her the resolve to dedicate herself to Ave Mujica. Sakiko writes a letter to Tomori, apologizing for dragging MyGO!!!!! into their issues, and thanks Tomori for comforting her through her words and finding her determination. Sakiko promises to Tomori that she will protect Ave Mujica and declares she will shoulder responsibility in handling the band. She then visits their former agency, demanding support for their revival.
13	"Per aspera ad astra." (English: Through Adversity to the Stars.)	Hajime Yamanokuchi	Hitomi Ogawa	Hiroshi Morita & Kozue Oka	March 27, 2025
Ave Mujica and MyGO!!!!! simultaneously hold separate performances for their fans. MyGO!!!!! sings on moving towards the future with their lives while openly expressing their flaws and continuing to understand each other. Meanwhile, Ave Mujica sings on acknowledging their fleeting nature and instability. Between their songs, Ave Mujica performs a theatrical narrative segment in which their stage characters are reframed from abandoned dolls who gain sentience through a special moon to knights living blissfully in paradise, although quietly unsatisfied in the absence of Oblivionis, whom they are waiting to return and help them forget their troubles. Doloris arrives in paradise, pleading to forget so as to be released from her misery, prompting Oblivionis to return and grant the wishes of the knights. Oblivionis declares that even if the others forget, she will not. Ave Mujica then sings of their intention to not face reality and continue living out the present through their fantasy in ignorance of the band's tenuous circumstances. As Ave Mujica and MyGO!!!!! both conclude their concerts amid standing ovations, Mutsumi sees Mortis smiling at her in their reflection in a hand mirror, and MyGO!!!!! join hands and thank their audience together.

=== Manga ===
A manga adaptation written and illustrated by Pinfu Hiroyama, titled BanG Dream! Ave Mujica -manuscriptus-, was announced on October 21, 2024. It was serialized in Comic Growl from January 10, 2025, to March 19, 2026, in both Japanese and English. Its chapters have been collected in three tankōbon volumes as of April 2026.

==== Volumes ====
No.	Japanese release date	Japanese ISBN
1	February 7, 2025	978-4-04-899665-5
2	September 8, 2025	978-4-04-899768-3
3	April 8, 2026	978-4-04-921124-5

=== Anime film ===
In August 2025, an anime film serving as a sequel to the television series was revealed to be in production, later titled BanG Dream! Ave Mujica prima aurora. It was directed by Kōdai Kakimoto, written by Akiko Waba and Midori Gotō, and produced by Nichicaline. The film was released in Japanese theaters on October 16, 2026.

== Reception ==
Prior to the series' release, Christopher Farris of Anime News Network expressed excitement for its premiere, as he imagined it would be "potentially...more unhinged" than BanG Dream! It's MyGO!!!!!, and praised the opening and ending sequences. Steve Jones anticipated the premiere as well, saying he was eager to see the "melodrama" and more potential yuri elements. Nick Creamer wrote on the Crunchyroll blog that the series "shows every intention of being even more insane" than It's MyGO!!!!!.

In an ANN preview guide for the series, Farris suggested watching It's MyGO!!!!! beforehand, as he felt the narrative would be difficult to follow without prior knowledge of its predecessor. He commented that the series aimed to reframe Sakiko in a "more sympathetic light" than previously, making her a more complex character, and praised the writing by Yuniko Ayana, and called it "earned continuation" of It's MyGO!!!!!. Farris reviewed the series for ANN. He praised the series writing by Ayana which "defined by smaller, subtler details that dot the stories" which later contribute to strong plotlines and character developments, while rewarding repeat viewing, noted that Sakiko's backstory is "more ambiguously complex" than it appeared at first, asserted that the series narrative focuses on satisfaction, self-care, and the "line between selflessness and self-destruction," and praised the animation by Sanzigen. In reviews of episodes 4 and 5, Farris described everyone in the Ave Mujica band as "damaged teen[s] desperately in need of therapy," said that series is "very funny" in a dark humor way, and praised series director Hiroshi Morita, but had mixed views on the subtitling by the third-party company contracted by Crunchyroll. The series was ranked as the most popular anime of the Winter 2025 anime season as the result of a poll of Dengeki Online readers during the series' broadcast in February 2025.

As said some Chinese-language media, series, especially its seventh episode, sparked polarized reactions and discussions among viewers due to its plot twists and the singer's vocal skills. Wu Jianye, writing in the Chinese digital newspaper The Paper, gave a mixed review and criticized the series for having very few performances by the band throughout the story, overemphasizing the characters' extreme personalities and conflicts, and overall having an exaggerated tone which was considered unrealistic.

== Sequel ==
A sequel to both Ave Mujica and It's MyGO!!!!! was announced following the final episode's release. The anime, titled BanG Dream! MyGO!!!!! // Ave Mujica, is set to premiere on January 8, 2027, on the Friday Anime Night programming block on Nippon Television and its affiliates.
