= Soul'd Out =

00s Japanese hip-hop band from Tokyo

- Origin: Tokyo, Japan
- Genres: Hip-hop; R&B; J-pop
- Years active: 1999–2009, 2010-2014
- Label: Sony Music Japan
- Members: Diggy-MO'; Bro.Hi; Shinnosuke
- Website: Sony music site

Soul'd Out (usually styled as SOUL'd OUT) was a Japanese hip-hop trio, consisting of Diggy-MO' (MC), Bro.Hi (MC/Beatboxer), and Shinnosuke (DJ). Their name is a portmanteau of "soul" and "sold out", and the group is sometimes referred to by their initials, S.O. On 30 January 2014, the group announced on Facebook that they would disband after their final album, To From, was released on 9 April 2014.

== Members ==
=== Diggy-MO' ===
Diggy-MO' was the group's lead vocalist and track co-producer. He was classically trained on piano from the age of 10 and participated in a band in his school days. While he attended a university of fine arts with a major in graphics, he regardless pursued a career in music. Outside of his work as a rapper, Diggy-MO' has also worked as a singer, particularly so in his solo works.

Diggy-MO' launched his solo career around the time of Soul'd Out's initial hiatus. His first single, "Bakusou Yume Uta" (released on 26 November 2008), was used as the third ending theme of the anime Soul Eater. His first solo album, Diggyism, was released on 25 March 2009. Furthermore, his solo single "Stay Beautiful" (released on 12 May 2010) was used as the 23rd ending theme of the anime series Bleach.

=== Bro.Hi ===
Bro.Hi was the beatboxer for the group while also writing lyrics and serving as an MC. He had previously played drums in a band while at middle school, but gained interests in lyricism from Jim Morrison and in beatboxing from having seen The Roots live.

Around the time of Soul'd Out's hiatus, Bro.Hi formed the band EdgePlayer, a band which fuses rock with DJ work for the sake of club performances. The band's first full album, Twisted, was released on 28 July 2010.

=== Shinnosuke ===
Shinnosuke served as the track producer for Soul'd Out alongside Diggy-MO'. He furthermore has experience in writing lyrics, as well as arranging and remixing music for other artists. As a child, he participated in a band in his own by playing on keyboards. He has served as a track producer since his time as a high schooler, at which time he was inspired by the band Jam & Lewis. Around the time of Soul'd Out's hiatus, he launched his solo project "S'capade", releasing an album under the same name on 9 June 2010.

== Discography ==
=== Studio albums ===
List of studio albums, showing selected details, chart positions, certifications and sales
Title	Details	Peaks	Certifications	Sales
Title	Details	JPN	Certifications	Sales
Soul'd Out	Released: 27 August 2003; Label: SME Japan; Formats: CD	3	RIAJ: Platinum	JPN: 250,000+
To All Tha Dreamers	Released: 2 February 2005; Label: SME Japan; Formats: CD	2	RIAJ: Platinum	JPN: 250,000+
Alive	Released: 8 March 2006; Label: SME Japan; Formats: CD	3	RIAJ: Gold	JPN: 100,000+
Attitude	Released: 23 January 2008; Label: SME Japan; Formats: CD	7		
so_mania	Released: 29 August 2012; Label: SME Japan; Formats: CD	19		
To From	Released: 9 April 2014; Label: SME Japan; Formats: CD	17		

=== Singles & EPs ===
Year	Date	Title	Peak positions	Notes	Certifications	Sales	Album
Year	Date	Title	JPN	Notes	Certifications	Sales	Album
2003	22 January	Wekapipo (ウェカピポ)	16		* RIAJ: Gold * RIAJ: Gold	JPN: 200,000+	Soul'd Out
2003	9 April	Flyte Time	10		* RIAJ: Gold	JPN: 100,000+	Soul'd Out
2003	9 July	Dream Drive/Shut Out	7				Soul'd Out
2003	19 November	Love, Peace & Soul	10				To All Tha Dreamers
2004	21 April	1,000,000 Monsters Attack	7	appeared in FIFA Football 2005 soundtrack	* RIAJ: Gold	JPN: 100,000+	To All Tha Dreamers
2004	14 July	Magenta Magenta	10				To All Tha Dreamers
2004	3 November	Blues	9				To All Tha Dreamers
2005	1 January	To All Tha Dreamers	7	ED for Yakitate!! Japan anime series	* RIAJ: Gold; *RIAJ: Gold	JPN: 200,000+	To All Tha Dreamers
2005	31 August	Iruka (イルカ)	11				Alive
2005	7 December	Alive	15		* RIAJ: Gold	JPN: 100,000+	Alive
2006	8 February	Tokyo Tsūshin ~Urbs Communication~	13		* RIAJ: Gold	JPN: 100,000+	Alive
2006	26 April	Catwalk	15				Alive
2006	27 September	Starlight Destiny	6				Attitude
2007	21 February	Grown Kids/Voodoo Kingdom	12	Theme song for JoJo's Bizarre Adventure: Phantom Blood anime movie ("Voodoo Kingdom)			Attitude
2007	5 September	Megalapolis Patrol	17	OP for The Boondocks animated series in Japan			Attitude
2007	3 October	Tongue Te Tongue	10				Attitude
2007	28 November	Cozmic Travel	16				Attitude
2011	27 April	and 7	22				so_mania
2012	25 April	Superfeel	44				so_mania
2012	1 August	Singin' My Luv	38	ED for Chōyaku Hyakunin Isshu: Uta Koi anime series			so_mania

=== Vinyls ===
- Magenta Magenta - released 28 June 2004
- Blues - released 3 November 2004
- To All Tha Dreamers - released 1 January 2005
- Lulu Bell (ルル・ベル) - released 20 April 2005
- Alive - released 6 December 2005
- Tokyo Tsūshin ~Urbs Communication~ (TOKYO通信 ～Urbs Communication～; Tokyo Communication) - released 21 June 2006
- Pop'n Top - released 21 June 2006

=== Compilation & remix albums ===
List of remix albums and compilations, showing selected details, chart positions, certifications and sales
Title	Details	Peaks	Certifications	Sales
Title	Details	JPN	Certifications	Sales
Movies & Remixies	Released: 10 December 2003; Label: SME Japan; Formats: CD	22		
Movies & Remixies 2	Released: 18 May 2005; Label: SME Japan; Formats: CD	13		
Remixes & Outside	Released: 21 June 2006; Label: SME Japan; Formats: CD	24		
Single Collection	Released: 27 December 2006; Label: SME Japan; Formats: CD	2	RIAJ: Platinum	JPN: 250,000+
Flip Side Collection	Released: 5 March 2008; Label: SME Japan; Formats: CD	39		
Movies & Remixies 4	Released: 30 July 2008; Label: SME Japan; Formats: CD	32		
Decade	Released: 23 January 2013; Label: SME Japan; Formats: CD	32		
Introduction to Soul'd Out	Released: 3 August 2026; Label: Sony Music Labels; Format: DL, Streaming	—		
"—" denotes releases that did not chart or were not released in that region.

=== Video albums ===
- Tour 2003 "Dream'd Live" - released 25 February 2004
- Tour 2005 "To All Tha Dreamers" - released 14 September 2005
- Tour 2007 "Single Collection" Live at Nihon Budokan - released 18 July 2007
- Tour 2008 "Attitude" - released 30 July 2008
  - Held on 23 April 2008, in JCB Hall, Tokyo Dome City, the Live DVD covers the final performance from their Japan tour 「Tour 2008 "Attitude"」.
- 10th Anniversary Premium Live "Anniv122" - released 1 May 2013
- Soul'd Out Final Tour "0" - released 22 October 2014
