= Kanon Shizaki =

Japanese voice actress and musician

- 志崎 樺音
- Born: February 8
- Other name: Non-chan
- Occupation: Voice actress
- Musical career
- Instruments: Vocals; Keyboard
- Years active: 2018–present

Kanon Shizaki (志崎 樺音, Shizaki Kanon; born February 8) is a Japanese voice actress and musician who is currently freelance and was previously affiliated with Ace Crew Entertainment. She plays the keyboard for the band Roselia of the BanG Dream! franchise, which includes portraying the character Rinko Shirokane. She also was the keyboardist for the unit Happy Around! of D4DJ, where she voiced Rei Togetsu until 2022.

== Career ==
Shizaki attended the Senzoku Gakuen College of Music, where she was a student of the Rock and Pop Course Vocal Department. In 2014, she played in a band at Syracuse University in the United States as part of her school's foreign exchange program.

On November 7, 2018, during Roselia's Vier concert at Shinagawa Stellar Ball, Shizaki was revealed as the band's new keyboardist; at the time, she had been playing the piano for 12 years. In addition to playing for the band in live performances, she replaced the departing Satomi Akesaka as the character Rinko Shirokane in the BanG Dream! anime and mobile game BanG Dream! Girls Band Party!. During a December 2018 interview with Geki Rock, bandmates Megu Sakuragawa, Aina Aiba, and Haruka Kudō noted Shizaki was quickly accepted by fans and the band as her shy personality is similar to Rinko's; Sakuragawa, who portrays Rinko's best friend Ako, described her conversations with Shizaki as feeling like she was talking to her character. Shizaki's first full show with Roselia was the BanG Dream! 7th Live on February 21, 2019 (subtitled Hitze) at the Nippon Budokan. Her anime debut came in BanG Dream! 2nd Season, while her voice replaced Akesaka's as Rinko in Girls Band Party! with the game's second anniversary update in March.

In 2019, Shizaki joined Bushiroad's newly-created D4DJ franchise as Rei Togetsu of the unit Happy Around!. She had previously sang at the Bushiroad DJ Live Vol. 2 event on April 5 at Shinkiba Studio Coast, where D4DJ's first concert was announced. Shizaki's debut show with D4DJ was the project's second live on October 14 at Shinagawa Prince Hotel Stella Ball. In August 2020, she performed with Roselia and Happy Around! at the BanG Dream! 8th Live, playing with the former as the headliner on the live's first day and the latter as the opening act on the second.

On January 9, 2021, the BanG Dream! franchise announced that Shizaki tested positive for COVID-19. The test prevented her from participating in the project's Raukure! and Asuhamo events two days later as she underwent treatment. Shizaki was cleared to resume activities nine days later after negative tests. The following year on January 18, she was diagnosed with Reinke's edema, which affects the vocal cord, forcing her to miss BanG Dream! and D4DJ events until the end of February.

On August 14, 2022, D4DJ announced her departure from the franchise. On August 31, 2022, Shizaki left Ace Crew Entertainment and became freelance.

== Filmography ==
=== Anime ===
| Year | Title | Role | Notes |
|---|---|---|---|
| 2019 | BanG Dream! 2nd Season | Rinko Shirokane | |
| 2019 | BanG Dream! Film Live | Rinko Shirokane | Movie |
| 2020 | BanG Dream! 3rd Season | Rinko Shirokane | |
| 2020 | BanG Dream! Girls Band Party! Pico: Ohmori | Rinko Shirokane | |
| 2020 | D4DJ First Mix | Rei Togetsu | |
| 2021 | D4DJ Petit Mix | Rei Togetsu | |
| 2021 | BanG Dream! Episode of Roselia | Rinko Shirokane | Two-part film series |
| 2021 | BanG Dream! Film Live 2nd Stage | Rinko Shirokane | Movie |
| 2021 | BanG Dream! Girls Band Party! Pico Fever! | Rinko Shirokane | |

=== Video games ===
| Year | Title | Role | Notes |
|---|---|---|---|
| 2019–present | BanG Dream! Girls Band Party! | Rinko Shirokane | |
| 2020 | Lost Decade | Rinko Shirokane | Limited-time collaboration between Lost Decade and Roselia |
| 2020–2022 | D4DJ Groovy Mix | Rei Togetsu | |
