= 14th Seiyu Awards =

Voice acting award in 2020

- Awarded for: Voice acting in Japan
- Date: March 7, 2020
- Location: No ceremony
- Country: Japan

Highlights
- Best Lead Actor: Natsuki Hanae
- Best Lead Actress: Aoi Koga
- Website: www.seiyuawards.jp

The 14th Seiyu Awards (声優アワード) were announced on March 7, 2020 by Nippon Cultural Broadcasting. The winners of the Merit Awards, the Kei Tomiyama Award, and the Kazue Takahashi Award, were announced on 18 February 2020. The ceremony was originally scheduled to be held at the Bunka Housou Media Plus Hall, but was cancelled during COVID-19 pandemic. The results were instead announced on the Chou! A&G radio program.

== Award winners ==
Winners	Agency	Highlight Works
Best Actor in a Leading Role
Natsuki Hanae	Across Entertainment	Tanjirō Kamado (Demon Slayer: Kimetsu no Yaiba)
Best Actress in a Leading Role
Aoi Koga	81 Produce	Kaguya Shinomiya (Kaguya-sama: Love is War)
Best Actors in Supporting Roles
Kaito Ishikawa	Pro-Fit	Naofumi Iwatani (The Rising of the Shield Hero), Tobio Kageyama (Haikyuu!!)
Makoto Furukawa	Toy's Factory	Miyuki Shirogane (Kaguya-sama: Love is War)
Best Actresses in Supporting Roles
Atsumi Tanezaki	Haikyō	Juno (Beastars)
Best New Actors
Takeo Ōtsuka	I'm Enterprise	Kakeru Kuruhara (Run with the Wind)
Gakuto Kajiwara	Haikyō	Shinra Kusakabe (Fire Force)
Kotaro Daigo	A-Light	Hodaka Morishima (Weathering with You)
Katsumi Fukuhara	Axl-One	Yukiya Araki (W'z)
Shōgo Yano	Super Eccentric Theater	Mafuyu Satō (Given), Nanao Kisaragi (Tsurune)
Best New Actresses
Madoka Asahina	81 Produce	Asumi Kominami (We Never Learn)
Miho Okasaki	I'm Enterprise	Rimuru Tempest (That Time I Got Reincarnated as a Slime)
Miyuri Shimabukuro	Office Osawa	Carole (Carole & Tuesday)
Sayumi Suzushiro	Arts Vision	Akira Ono (Hi Score Girl)
Fairouz Ai	Pro-Fit	Hibiki Sakura (How Heavy Are the Dumbbells You Lift?)
Nana Mori	Arbre	Hina Amano (Weathering with You)
Merit Award
Minoru Yada	KeKKe Corporation	Doctor Shikishima (Gigantor), Baikinsennin (Anpanman), Mister Geppetto (Pinocchio: The Series)
Makoto Kōsaka	Haikyō	Hiromi Oka (Aim for the Ace!), Mari Sakurano (Reideen the Brave), O-Jirō (Shin Obake no Q-Taro)
Personality Award
Showtaro Morikubo	ADD9TH	
Kei Tomiyama Memorial Award
Yū Mizushima	Production Ace	Toshio Ohtomo (Creamy Mami, the Magic Angel), Magical Angel Creamy Mami (Toshio Ohtomo), Mars (Six God Combination Godmars)
Kazue Takahashi Memorial Award
Rika Fukami	Vi-Vo	Sailor Venus (Sailor Moon), Myung Fang Lone (Macross Plus), Spoor (Banner of the Stars)
Foreign Movie/Drama Award
Kōichi Yamadera	Across Entertainment	
Atsuko Tanaka	Mausu Promotion	
Game Award
Kōdai Sakai	Early Wing	A3!
Most Valuable Seiyū
Hiroshi Kamiya	Aoni Production	
Singing Award
Winner	Members	Highlight Works
Roselia	Aina Aiba; Haruka Kudō; Yuki Nakashima; Megu Sakuragawa; Kanon Shizaki	BanG Dream!

Synergy Award
Winner
Demon Slayer: Kimetsu no Yaiba
Kid/Family Award
Winner
Moomin
Influencer Award
Winner	Agency
Mamoru Miyano	Himawari Theatre Group
Special Awards
Winner	Reason
Studio Pierrot	40th anniversary
Hiroki Suzuki (Awesome Inc.)	Dororo
