= Aina Aiba =

Japanese voice actress and singer

- 相羽 あいな
- Born: October 17, 1988 (age 38); Hokkaido, Japan
- Other names: Aiai; Yuuki Harima
- Occupations: Voice actress; singer; professional wrestler
- Years active: 2015–present
- Agent: Hibiki

Aina Aiba (相羽 あいな, Aiba Aina; born October 17, 1988) is a voice actress, professional wrestler and singer from Japan. She is affiliated with the talent agency Hibiki, and is best known for being the lead vocalist of Roselia of the BanG Dream! multimedia franchise, portraying the character of Yukina Minato, as well as voicing Claudine Saijō in the media franchise Revue Starlight and Tokoha Anjou in Cardfight!! Vanguard.

== Early life ==
Aiba was born in Hokkaido but raised in Osaka. She went to and graduated from Amusement Media Voice Actor Talent Academy in 2010.

== Career ==
Before becoming a seiyuu, Aiba was a professional wrestler under the name Yūki Harima (播磨佑紀, Harima Yūki) for about two years, working as a stage actress with the same name too. During her pro-wrestling career, she was part of the organization Actwres girl'Z, under their "Beginning" brand, and made her debut on September 6, 2015. Aiba fought five times before retiring from the ring and does MC work for New Japan Pro-Wrestling's matches.

Aiba debuted in voice acting by providing the voice of Tokoha Anjō in Cardfight!! Vanguard G: NEXT, replacing Emi Nitta. In 2017, she began voicing and performing in the franchise BanG Dream! as Yukina Minato of the band Roselia. In 2018, she began voicing Claudine Saijō from Revue Starlight.

Aiba made her professional singing debut from Bushiroad Music in November 2016 with her first st single "Yume no Hikari Kimi no Mirai", which was used as the ending theme for Future Card Buddyfight DDD. She restarted her solo singing career with the single "Lead the way", which was released on October 16, 2019. It was used as the opening theme for the anime Cardfight!! Vanguard: Shinemon.

On March 3, 2018, Aiba, who was a member of the unit Dōbutsu Biscuits x PPP, was one of the winners of the Singing Award during the 12th Seiyu Awards. In 2020, she and Roselia received the Singing Award at the 14th Seiyu Awards.

== Filmography ==
=== Anime ===
2016

- Cardfight!! Vanguard G: Next – Tokoha Anjou

2017

- BanG Dream! – Yukina Minato
- Kemono Friends – Iwatobi Penguin
- Cardfight!! Vanguard G: Z – Tokoha Anjou

2018

- BanG Dream! Girls Band Party! Pico – Yukina Minato
- Revue Starlight – Claudine Saijō

2019

- BanG Dream! 2nd Season – Yukina Minato
- BanG Dream! Film Live – Yukina Minato

2020

- BanG Dream! 3rd Season – Yukina Minato
- BanG Dream! Girls Band Party! Pico: Ohmori – Yukina Minato

2021

- BanG Dream! Episode of Roselia (Yakusoku and Song I am.) – Yukina Minato
- BanG Dream! Film Live 2nd Stage – Yukina Minato
- BanG Dream! Girls Band Party! Pico Fever! – Yukina Minato
- D Cide Traumerei – Maria Nanase
- PuraOre! Pride of Orange – Seiko Kuga
- Revue Starlight Movie – Claudine Saijō

2022

- Teppen!!!!!!!!!!!!!!! Laughing 'til You Cry – Chitose Amano

2023

- Sorcerous Stabber Orphen: Chaos in Urbanrama – Winona

=== Games ===
- BanG Dream! Girls Band Party! – Yukina Minato
- Brown Dust – Eunrang
- Revue Starlight: Re LIVE – Claudine Saijō

=== Radio ===
- Radio Vanguard G Next (2016–2017)

=== Dubbing ===
- The Last Summoner (2023) – Hana

== Discography ==
=== Mini-albums ===
	Release date	Title	Package number		Oricon peak ranking
	Release date	Title	Limited edition	Standard edition	Oricon peak ranking
1	April 15, 2020	Sign	BRMM-10257	BRMM-10258	19

=== Singles ===
	Release date	Title	Package number		Oricon peak ranking
	Release date	Title	Limited edition	Standard edition	Oricon peak ranking
1	November 9, 2016	"Yume no Hikari Kimi no Mirai" (夢のヒカリ君のミライ)	BRMM-10052	BRMM-10051	
2	October 16, 2019	"Lead the Way"	BRMM-10211	BRMM-10212	13
