= Yuki Nakashima (actress) =

Japanese actress, voice actress, and model

- 中島 由貴
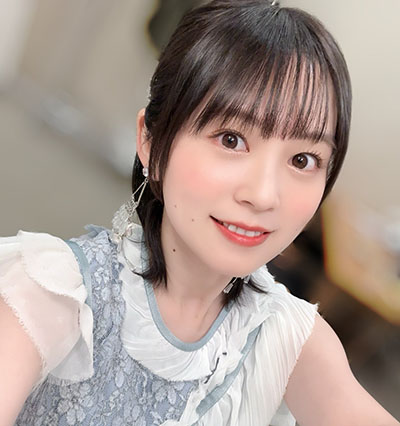
- Nakashima in 2024
- Born: September 12, 1997 (age 28); Wakayama Prefecture, Japan
- Occupations: Actor; voice actress; model; singer
- Years active: 2006–present
- Agents: Earth Star Entertainment (2014–2017); Beffect (2018–present)
- Notable work: The Idolmaster Cinderella Girls as Yūki Otokura; BanG Dream! as Lisa Imai; Days with My Stepsister as Saki Ayase; Project Sekai: Colorful Stage! feat. Hatsune Miku as Shiho Hinomori
- Height: 160.5 cm (5 ft 3 in)
- Musical career
- Genres: J-Pop; Anison
- Instruments: Vocals; guitar; bass guitar
- Years active: 2020–present
- Label: NBCUniversal Entertainment Japan
- Website: nakashimayuki.com

Yuki Nakashima (中島 由貴, Nakashima Yuki; born September 12, 1997) is a Japanese actress, voice actress, model, singer, and bassist from Wakayama Prefecture who is affiliated with Beffect. She began her career as a child model and actress, appearing in magazines and commercials, before passing a voice acting audition and becoming a member of the idol group Earth Star Dream. In 2018, she was cast as the character Lisa Imai in the multimedia franchise BanG Dream!; as part of her responsibilities, she plays the bass for the band Roselia.

== Biography ==
Nakashima promoting the Circle Fire vol.3 concert in 2018

Nakashima was born in Wakayama Prefecture on September 12, 1997. She had been interested in entertainment from an early age, and she wanted to do something involving singing, acting, or dancing. While in junior high school, she joined a jazz music club where she learned how to play the bass guitar. She then became interested in voice acting after watching the anime series Gin Tama, an interest that would later grow after becoming familiar with the anime series Teekyu.

Nakashima began her career as a child model, appearing in the magazine JS Girl. She also appeared in a number of television commercials and dramas while affiliated with the talent agency Amuse. In 2014, at the urging of her mother, she participated in a voice acting audition held by the publishing company Earth Star Entertainment. She and Kanon Takao won the competition, beating 3,000 other contestants. Following the competition, she, Takao, and some of other the participants became part of the idol group Earth Star Dream. The following year, she made her voice acting debut in Teekyu.

In 2017, Nakashima was cast as Yūki Otokura in The Idolmaster Cinderella Girls. Later that year, she announced that she would leave Earth Star Dream and begin solo activities. Although she initially announced that she would remain with Earth Star Entertainment, she left the company in April 2018 after they announced that they would cease artist management activities. She then joined the talent agency Beffect. In May 2018, it was announced that she would be replacing Yurika Endō, who had announced her retirement from the entertainment industry, as the voice actor of the character Lisa Imai in the multimedia franchise BanG Dream!. As part of her new role, she joined the band Roselia as its bassist.

On December 23, 2020, Nakashima made her solo artist debut under NBCUniversal Entertainment Japan with the release of her first album, Chapter I.

== Personal life ==
Nakashima's interests include listening to music and playing the bass guitar. She had been interested in promoting Wakayama Prefecture, and in 2018 she became an ambassador for a campaign to promote the prefecture's orange industry. In 2019, she was appointed as a public relations officer by the prefectural government to further promote the area.

Since 2019 she maintains a gaming channel with her Roselia bandmate Megu Sakuragawa.

== Filmography ==
=== Anime ===
2015

- Teekyu as Kinako Tanaka
- Castle Town Dandelion as Female Santa (episode 9)
- A Simple Thinking About Blood Type

2016

- Ooya-san wa Shishunki! as Asuka Mori
- Onigiri as Veronica
- Usakame as Kinako Tanaka

2017

- Yu-Gi-Oh! VRAINS as Aoi Zaizen
- The Idolmaster Cinderella Girls as Yūki Otokura
- Himouto! Umaru-chan as Akira Asuka

2018

- BanG Dream! Girls Band Party! Pico as Lisa Imai

2019

- BanG Dream! 2nd Season as Lisa Imai
- BanG Dream! Film Live as Lisa Imai

2020

- BanG Dream! 3rd Season as Lisa Imai
- BanG Dream! Girls Band Party! ☆ Pico ~Ohmori~ as Lisa Imai

2021

- BanG Dream! Episode of Roselia (Yakusoku and Song I am.) as Lisa Imai
- BanG Dream! Film Live 2nd Stage as Lisa Imai
- BanG Dream! Girls Band Party! Pico Fever! as Lisa Imai

2022

- Petit Sekai as Shiho Hinomori
- The Genius Prince's Guide to Raising a Nation Out of Debt as Zeno
- Idol Bu Show as Yui Kongōji
- Cardfight!! Vanguard will+Dress as Mirei Minae
- Prima Doll as Hо̄kiboshi

2024

- Days with My Stepsister as Saki Ayase
- Narenare: Cheer for You! as Suzuha Obunai
- Tasūketsu as Eren Kunashiri
- Loner Life in Another World as Gal D

2025

- Colorful Stage! The Movie: A Miku Who Can't Sing as Shiho Hinomori
- The Brilliant Healer's New Life in the Shadows as Krishna

2026

- Tetsuryō! Meet with Tetsudō Musume as Chihaya Asakura

=== Games ===
2015

- Emil Chronicle Online

2017

- The Idolmaster Cinderella Girls as Yūki Otokura

2018

- BanG Dream! Girls Band Party! as Lisa Imai
- Dragalia Lost as Elias

2020

- Project Sekai: Colorful Stage! feat. Hatsune Miku as Shiho Hinomori

2022

- Azur Lane as HMS Vanguard

2024

- Honkai Impact 3rd as Dreamseeker (1P) and Leylah
- Granblue Fantasy as Indala

2025

- Umamusume: Pretty Derby as Lucky Lilac

== Discography ==
=== Albums ===
#	Release date	Title	Package number		Peak
#	Release date	Title	Regular edition	Limited edition	Peak
1	December 23, 2020	Chapter I	GNCA-1597	GNCA-1596	24
2	March 1, 2023	Sapphire	GNCA-1936	GNCA-1935	10

=== Singles ===
#	Release date	Title	Package number		Peak	Album
#	Release date	Title	Regular edition	Limited edition	Peak	Album
1	February 16, 2022	"Day of Bright Sunshine"	GNCA-0658	GNCA-0659	11	Sapphire
2	May 25, 2022	"Route Blue"	GNCA-0671	GNCA-0669	15	Sapphire
