= Haruka Kudō =

Haruka Kudō may refer to:

- Haruka Kudō (singer) (born 1999), Japanese actress, former singer with the group Morning Musume
- Haruka Kudō (voice actress) (born 1989), Japanese voice actress
