= Anfang =

2018 studio album by Roselia

Studio album by Roselia
- Released: May 2, 2018
- Studios: ALive Recording Studio, Setagaya, Tokyo; Aria Studio, Shinjuku, Tokyo; Studio Sunshine, Meguro, Tokyo; Freedom Studio Infinity, Shinjuku, Tokyo; Studio Sound Dali, Setagaya, Tokyo; Victor Studio, Shibuya, Tokyo
- Genres: Gothic rock; pop; alternative rock; video game music; anime song
- Length: 54:01
- Language: Japanese
- Label: Bushiroad Music
- Producer: Shuji Yoshimura

Roselia chronology
Anfang (2018)	Wahl (2020)

Singles from Anfang
- 1. "Black Shout" Released: April 19, 2017; 2. "Re:birth day" Released: June 28, 2017; 3. "Passionate Starmine" Released: August 30, 2017; 4. "Oneness" Released: November 29, 2017; 5. "Opera of the Wasteland" Released: March 21, 2018

Anfang is the debut studio album by Japanese gothic rock band Roselia. It was released on May 2, 2018, by Bushiroad Music. The album contains ten previously released tracks, as well as two new tracks, "Neo-Aspect" and "Legendary", written for the album.

The album was released with two separate editions: a regular edition containing the CD, and a limited edition containing Blu-ray discs of Roselia's first two solo concerts, Rosenlied, held at Shibuya Duo Music Exchange on June 30, 2017, and Zeit, held at Makuhari Messe on October 8, 2017.

Anfang sold 25,000 copies and was downloaded 5,510 times in its first week of release, allowing it to rank second on the Oricon Albums Chart and top both the Oricon and iTunes digital album charts. By the end of 2018, Anfang had approximately 45,266 sales, the 14th-most for an anime album in 2018.

== Background and release ==
The album was announced in early 2018, and was scheduled for release on May 2, 2018. The album contains tracks from Roselia's first five singles, up to "Opera of the Wasteland". The title Anfang, meaning "beginning" in German, was chosen to represent the band's beginnings and development since its formation.

The first single for the album, "Black Shout", was released on April 19, 2017, alongside the coupling track "Louder". The second single, "Re:birth day", was released on June 28, 2017 alongside "Sunkissed Rhodonite". "Passionate Starmine" was released as the third single on August 30, 2017, coupled with "Heroic Advent". "Oneness" was released as the fourth single alongside "Determination Symphony" on November 29, 2017. The final single, "Opera of the wasteland", was released on March 21, 2018, with "Our Path" (Kiseki) as the coupling track. All of the album's tracks were also added to the mobile rhythm game BanG Dream! Girls Band Party!.

The tracks "Legendary" and "Heroic Advent" were used as the opening and closing themes for the 2018 anime Cardfight!! Vanguard.

== Commercial performance ==
Anfang peaked at #2 on the Oricon Albums Chart and sold more than 25,000 copies within the first week of release, allowing it to top both the Oricon and iTunes digital album charts within the first week of release. By the end of the year, Anfang had approximately 45,266 sales, the 14th-most for an anime album in 2018.

== Track listing ==
Anfang track listing
No.	Title	Music	Arrangement	Length
1.	"Neo-Aspect"	Fujinaga Ryutaro	Fujinaga Ryutaro	5:07
2.	"Black Shout"	Agematsu Noriyasu	Fujinaga Ryutaro	4:04
3.	"Opera of the Wasteland"	Fujinaga Ryutaro	Fujinaga Ryutaro	4:40
4.	"Sunkissed Rhodonite (陽だまりロードナイト, Hidamari Rōdonaito)"	Fujinaga Ryutaro	Fujinaga Ryutaro	4:45
5.	"Oneness"	Agematsu Noriyasu	Fujinaga Ryutaro	3:57
6.	"Re:birth Day"	Fujinaga Ryutaro	Fujinaga Ryutaro	4:22
7.	"Legendary"	Agematsu Noriyasu	Fujinaga Ryutaro	4:51
8.	"－Heroic Advent－"	Fujita Junpei	Fujinaga Ryutaro	3:39
9.	"Determination Symphony"	Fujinaga Ryutaro	Fujinaga Ryutaro	4:39
10.	"Passionate Starmine (熱色スターマイン, Nesshoku Sutāmain)"	Agematsu Noriyasu	Fujinaga Ryutaro	4:39
11.	"Our Path (軌跡, Kiseki)"	Fujinaga Ryutaro	Fujinaga Ryutaro	5:10
12.	"Louder"	Fujinaga Ryutaro	Fujinaga Ryutaro	3:34
Total length:				54:01

== Charts ==
Chart (2025)	Peak position
Japanese Albums (Oricon)	2
Japanese Digital Albums (Oricon)	1
Japanese Anime Albums (Year-End) (Oricon)	14
