= Makoto Kōsaka =

Japanese voice actress (born 1950)

- 高坂 真琴
- Born: 22 March 1950 (age 76); Osaka Prefecture, Japan
- Occupation: Voice actress
- Years active: 1968-present
- Notable work: Aim for the Ace! as Hiromi Oka; Brave Raideen as Mari Sakurano
- Awards: Merit Award at the 14th Seiyu Awards

Makoto Kōsaka (高坂 真琴, Kōsaka Makoto; born 22 March 1950) is a Japanese voice actress affiliated with Tokyo Actor's Consumer's Cooperative Society. She is best known for voicing Hiromi Oka in Aim for the Ace!, O-jirō in Little Ghost Q-Taro, and Mari Sakurano in Brave Raideen.

== Biography ==
Makoto Kōsaka was born on 22 March 1950 in Osaka Prefecture and was educated at Tokyo Metropolitan Koyamadai High School.

In 1968, she joined Gekidan Aoi Mi no Kai Union Pro and made her voice acting debut with Attack No. 1. In 1973, she was cast as Hiromi Oka, the protagonist of the Aim for the Ace!, and was transferred to the Tokyo Actor's Consumer's Cooperative Society the next year.

On 18 February 2020, she was awarded the Merit Award at the 14th Seiyu Awards.

== Filmography ==
=== Anime ===
1969

- Attack No. 1, Ōki

1971

- Little Ghost Q-Taro, O-jirō

1973

- Aim for the Ace!, Hiromi Oka

1975

- Brave Raideen, Mari Sakurano
- Time Bokan, Happy, Isosān

1976

- Groiser X Knuck, Kouji Hoshikawa
- Shin Don Chuck Monogatari, Fifi

1977

- Ore wa Teppei, Kanako Uesugi
- Nobody's Boy: Remi, Liz Acan

1978

- New Aim for the Ace!, Hiromi Oka
- The Story of Perrine, shepherd boy

1979

- Anne of Green Gables, Ruby Gillis
- Misha the Little Bear, Parurun

1980

- Muteking, The Dashing Warrior, Takomi
- The Wonderful Adventures of Nils, Nilsen

1981

- Kawa no Ko Kūkū, Karikari
- The Swiss Family Robinson: Flone of the Mysterious Island, Jack Robinson

1982

- Little Pollon, Media
- Maya the Honey Bee, Maggie

1984

- Katri, Girl of the Meadows, Claus Kuusela

1985

- GeGeGe no Kitarō, Hoshirō Tendō
- Hāi Step June, Daisuke

1988

- City Hunter 2, Bloody Mary

2007

- Love Com, Nobuko Ishihara's grandmother

=== Film ===
1979

- Aim for the Ace!, Hiromi Oka

1981

- Jarinko Chie, Pekochan

1986

- GeGeGe no Kitarō: The Strongest Yokai Army!! Disembark for Japan!

=== Tokusatsu ===
- Choujyu Sentai Liveman, Colon
- Tokusou Robo Janperson, Kevin, Carol/Black Carol
