= Ore wa Teppei =

Japanese manga series

- I'm Teppei
- cover of volume 6 of the manga

おれは鉄兵
- Manga
- Written by: Tetsuya Chiba
- Published by: Kodansha
- Magazine: Weekly Shonen Magazine
- Original run: August 1973 – April 1980
- Volumes: 31
- Anime television series

Teppei
- Directed by: Tadao Nagahama
- Written by: Sōji Yoshikawa
- Music by: Michiaki Watanabe
- Studio: Shin-Ei Animation (animation); Nippon Animation (planning and production)
- Original network: Fuji TV
- Original run: September 12, 1977 – March 27, 1978
- Episodes: 28

I'm Teppei (おれは鉄兵; transl. "Ore wa Teppei") is a manga written and illustrated by Tetsuya Chiba. It ran in Weekly Shonen Magazine for nearly eight years and received an anime adaptation in 1977. The series received the Kodansha Cultural Children's Award (not to be confused with the Kodansha Manga Award) in 1976.

== Plot ==
Teppei lives in the forest with his father, who is a treasure hunter. Teppei and his father are visited by an older boy named Nakajo from a school outside the forest, who demands that Teppei come with him. After a brief skirmish, Nakajo kills one of Teppei's pet wild animals, enraging the younger boy. This results in Teppei blowing up part of the forest with dynamite and him and his father being arrested.

Soon, Teppei's uncle finds him and brings him and his father to the city to reunite with his family. They are invited to live there from now on. Teppei joins a school, where we discover that he is illiterate. He sleeps through the majority of his lessons. After being forced to join a club, he settles on the Kendo club where he impresses the members by running 50 laps around the school. He is allowed to join and soon begins to demand radical changes to the system. Eventually, he takes charge of the younger half of the club. When the club is taken to the mountains to train, the younger half beats the older one to qualify for the competition to duel with another school.

Soon after this event, the younger half resign out of fear, leaving Teppei to compete alongside the older half against the other school, but after a close competition with the other school - Nakajo's school - they end up losing. Soon Teppei is expelled from his school due to bad grades. After being called to Nakajo's school by their Kendo club captain, Wakisaka, Teppei is determined to join their school, after being told that they drink and smoke there. Eventually, Teppei passes the test and joins the lowest class there.

Teppei defeats Wakisaka, resulting in him becoming the school's new captain. Several months later, the schools go to compete in the national competition. Teppei encounters another student named Kikuchi, who is one of the greatest swordfighters of his age. Kikuchi beats him half to death in an informal duel, wounding his pride, but when Teppei's team encounters Kikuchi's, Teppei's team ends up winning via time difference. That night, Kikuchi goes home to learn a new technique from his grandfather - "Falling Yellow Leaf". The next day, during the solo competition, Kikuchi and Teppei both make it to the final. Kikuchi manages to use the technique on Teppei, but in the end Teppei wins.

=== Characters ===
- Masako Nozawa as Teppei Uesugi
- Akiko Tsuboi as Azumi Uesugi
- Masao Imanishi as Hiromi Uesugi
- Tohru Furuya as Yoshiyuki
- Makoto Kōsaka as Kanako
- Shozo Iizuka as Yoshioka
- Youko Matsuoka as Onigiri
