= Danchigai =

Japanese manga and anime series

- First tankōbon volume cover, featuring (from left to right) Satsuki, Uzuki, Yayoi, and Mutsuki Nakano

だんちがい
- Genre: Comedy
- Manga
- Written by: Kazusa Yoneda
- Published by: Ichijinsha
- Magazine: Manga 4-Koma Palette
- Original run: June 22, 2011 – September 22, 2021
- Volumes: 11
- Anime television series
- Directed by: Hiroshi Kimura
- Produced by: Dream Creation
- Written by: Kazusa Yoneda (original story)
- Music by: Shusei
- Studio: Creators in Pack
- Licensed by: Crunchyroll (streaming)
- Original network: TV Saitama, KBS, tvk, Sun TV, AT-X
- Original run: July 10, 2015 – September 25, 2015
- Episodes: 12 + 1 OVA

Danchigai (だんちがい; lit. 'Big Difference') is a Japanese four-panel comedy manga series by Kazusa Yoneda. It was serialized in Ichijinsha's seinen manga magazine Manga 4-Koma Palette from June 2011 to September 2021. The series received an anime adaptation, which aired from July to September 2015.

== Plot ==
The story revolves around Haruki Nakano and his four sisters: Mutsuki, Yayoi, Uzuki, and Satsuki. While they may seem monotonous aside from the fact that Haruki's sisters do not give him a single opportunity to rest, lecturing him about every perceived mistake and playing tricks on him, he still loves his life.

== Characters ==
Haruki Nakano (仲野 晴輝, Nakano Haruki)
Voiced by: Atsushi Abe
Haruki is the only boy among the Nakano siblings and the second oldest. He attends high school as a first-year student. He chose a high school close to home so he could go home and play video games.^{Ch. 2-3}
Mutsuki Nakano (仲野 夢月, Nakano Mutsuki)
Voiced by: Satomi Akesaka
Haruki's older sister with the long black hair. She is very popular at school and has top grades,^{Ch. 2} but acts carefree when she is around Haruki, leading their schoolmates to think they are a couple.^{Ch. 0} She takes care of the household cooking and chores.^{Ch. 1, 2}
Yayoi Nakano (仲野 弥生, Nakano Yayoi)
Voiced by: Mikako Komatsu
Haruki's younger sister by a year. She is in her third-year of middle school.^{Ch. 0, 2} She has short brown hair. She is athletic and is often violent towards Haruki, calling him Baka-Eroki (stupid pervert).^{Ch. 2} She wants to make sure Haruki projects a proper image at school.^{Ch. 0, 2}
Uzuki Nakano (仲野 羽月, Nakano Uzuki)
Voiced by: Sora Tokui
The more active and outgoing of Haruki's younger twin sisters. She has short pink hair. She likes to tease and play pranks on Haruki. She is a third-year elementary school student.^{Ch. 3}
Satsuki Nakano (仲野 咲月, Nakano Satsuki)
Voiced by: Sayaka Horino
The quieter of Haruki's younger twin sisters. She has dark hair styled in twin tails. She shares his interest in anime and manga but is fonder still of her twin. She enjoys reading manga and watching anime. She too is in her third year of elementary school.^{Ch. 3}

== Media ==
=== Manga ===
Danchigai, written and illustrated by Kazusa Yoneda, was serialized in Ichijinsha's Manga 4-Koma Palette magazine from June 22, 2011, to September 22, 2021. A number of online chapters of the series were also released on Ichijinsha's website.

==== Volumes ====
The series has been collected into the following tankōbon volumes.

No.	Release date	ISBN
1	November 22, 2012	978-4-75-808159-7
2	December 22, 2014	978-4-75-808226-6
3	April 22, 2015	978-4-75-808230-3
4	September 19, 2015	978-4-75-808246-4
5	September 21, 2016	978-4-75-808270-9
6	September 22, 2017	978-4-75-808294-5
7	October 22, 2018	978-4-75-808315-7
8	July 22, 2019	978-4-75-808333-1
9	April 22, 2020	978-4-75-808342-3
10	January 25, 2021	978-4-75-808359-1
11	October 21, 2021	978-4-75-808374-4

=== Anime ===
An anime series based on the manga was directed by Hiroshi Kimura, with animation by the animation studio Creators in Pack, and was produced by Dream Creation, with audio production by Dax Production. Eriko Itō was in charge of character design, and Masakatsu Oomuro served as the series sound director. The series has four theme songs, one for each female lead. Satomi Akesaka sings "Early Morning", Mikako Komatsu sings "Let a good day", Sora Tokui sings "Gently Mischief", and Sayaka Horino sings "Princess Durandal".

The series, comprising twelve five-minute episodes, aired from July 10, to September 25, 2015, on TV Saitama, KBS, Sun TV, AT-X, and tvk. (Note: TV Saitama listed the series premiere at 25:00 on July 9, 2015, which is July 10 at 1:00 a.m.) The series is streamed by Crunchyroll worldwide except for Japan. It was released on Blu-ray in Japan on September 18, 2015.

==== Episodes ====
No.	Title	Ending Theme	Original air date
1	"Building One: The Yumeno Apartments"; Transliteration: "Ichi Gōtō Yumeno Danchi" (Japanese: 一号棟 夢野団地)	"Let a good day"	July 10, 2015
Haruki wakes up after a night of studying to find himself trapped by a sleeping Yayoi. The twins take this as a chance to torment their brother, which wakes Yayoi. She becomes angry at him, and Mutsuki threatens to take away their allowances to make them stop fighting.
2	"Building Two: The Twins Homework"; Transliteration: "Ni Gōtō Futago no Shukudai" (Japanese: 二号棟 双子の宿題)	"Gentle Mischief"	July 17, 2015
Both Haruki and Yayoi find the twins spying on them. It turns out that the two have a homework assignment requiring them to write about their family.
3	"Building Three: Mutsuki's True Colors"; Transliteration: "San Gōtō Mutsuki no Sugao" (Japanese: 三号棟 夢月の素顔)	"Early Morning"	July 24, 2015
Haruki comes home to find Mutsuki asleep in his room. She rapidly changes into her usual formal self when Yayoi and the twins arrive. When he finds her relaxing in his room again after her bath, he bemoans the fact that he is the only one she acts nonchalantly around.
4	"Building Four: Curry and Rice"; Transliteration: "Yon Gōtō Karēraisu" (Japanese: 四号棟 カレーライス)	"Princess Durandal"	July 31, 2015
The siblings go grocery shopping together. Mutsuki is given a basket of free food after the twins attract customers while praising the store's food samples. Taking offense at Haruki's suggestion that they would need a mild curry mix, the twins insist on buying a spicy one. At dinner, they are surprised to find it palatable; however, Mutsuki reveals that she had secretly purchased a mild one.
5	"Building Five: Satsuki's Anime Clock"; Transliteration: "Go Gōtō Satsuki no Anime Tokei" (Japanese: 五号棟 咲月のアニメ時計)	"Princess Durandal"	August 7, 2015
Haruki arrives home with a manga magazine and finds Satsuki waiting for him. Uzuki comments that Satsuki does not even need a clock to know when an anime is on. Haruki is then surprised when she passes up on watching the first episode of an anime she enjoys to play with Uzuki. Later, however, she watches it three times on reruns, and he wonders why she is not getting tired of it.
6	"Building Six: The Siblings' Multiplication"; Transliteration: "Roku Gōtō Shimai no Kakezan" (Japanese: 六号棟 姉妹のかけ算)	"Let a good day"	August 14, 2015
Haruki arrives home and Mutsuki offers to help him with his homework. He turns her down because she is bad at teaching. Helping Yayoi prepare for a math exam, he deduces that her problem is in her grasp of multiplication. When bedtime comes, she is still having trouble. The next day, when she returns from school, she refuses to show Haruki her test results. After a brief struggle, they fall and he lands on top of her, just as Mutsuki walks in, causing a misunderstanding.
7	"Building Seven: The Apartment Complex's Pool Opening"; Transliteration: "Nana Gōtō Danchi de Pūru Biraki" (Japanese: 七号棟 団地でプール開き)	"Early Morning"	August 21, 2015
Yayoi becomes jealous when the twins have swimming practice. She decides to set up an inflatable wading pool in the middle of their apartment and she, Haruki, and Mutsuki all get in it. Later, when the twins get home, they find the three have caught a cold due to the unseasonable swimming.
8	"Building Eight: Definitely Siblings"; Transliteration: "Hachi Gōtō Shimai desu ne" (Japanese: 八号棟 姉妹ですね)	"Gentle Mischief"	August 28, 2015
After reading a manga, Satsuki begins to worry that she and Uzuki may not actually be twins due to their dissimilar looks. Haruki convinces her otherwise by showing her that Mutsuki looked very much like her when she was younger. Uzuki then begins to wonder the same thing, but Mutsuki convinces her with a picture of their grandmother. Finally, Yayoi arrives home, bemoaning the fact that she cannot be related to any of them due to her receiving poor test scores when they all do very well.
9	"Building Nine: For the Love of Pranks"; Transliteration: "Kyū Gōtō Itazura Daisuki" (Japanese: 九号棟いたずら大好き)	"Gentle Mischief"	September 4, 2015
Uzuki begins acting strangely over dinner, even switching seats with Yayoi. Haruki catches on and begins to grow paranoid that she has spiked their dinner somehow. After being pressured into taking a bite, he realizes there is nothing wrong with it. After dinner, he finds Uzuki in his room where she asks him to read a book with her. Again growing suspicious, Haruki is put off by her innocent behavior. After she leaves, Satsuki drags him over to show him an anime episode she watched with Uzuki the other day, wherein the younger sister character acts kindly and proclaims her sibling love to her brother, then runs off exclaiming it was a prank. Satsuki believes this is the explanation for Uzuki's unusual behavior, which relieves Haruki that her "prank" is so simple. The next day, Uzuki confirms Satsuki's suspicions while Haruki pretends to be dumbfounded.
10	"Building Ten: Mutsuki's Request"; Transliteration: "Jū Gōtō Mudzuki o• ne• ga• i" (Japanese: 十号棟 夢月お•ね•が•い)	"Early Morning"	September 11, 2015
Haruki wakes up in the middle of the night to find Mutsuki leaning over him. After he calms down, Mutsuki reveals she has a favor to ask of him: she wants him to kiss her. Despite initial misunderstandings, Mutsuki reveals she has to kiss someone at school as part of a play for the school festival and wants to practice with Haruki beforehand. Haruki desperately tries to get out of his situation. However, Mutsuki remains adamant in her decision to practice with him. Moments before they are about to kiss, Haruki pushes her away, exclaiming that they should not, which causes Mutsuki to run out of the room. Haruki runs after her to apologize, only to find her realizing that she had mixed up the scripts for Snow White and Cinderella, and that the play she was supposed to be performing did not have a kiss scene at all.
11	"Building Eleven: How Yayoi Nurses"; Transliteration: "Jū Ichi Gōtō Yayoi no Kanbyō" (Japanese: 十一号棟 弥生の看病)	"Let a good day"	September 18, 2015
Yayoi finds Haruki lying on the floor in the middle of the night weak with a cold. Despite her initial reluctance, she helps him back into bed. The next day, the twins tease Yayoi about how she seems less upbeat due to the lack of Haruki's presence, which she fervently denies. Later, when Haruki wakes up, he finds Yayoi tending to him, as she skipped her after-school activities just to get home early. As she is wiping the sweat off his chest, the rest of the family walk in, misinterpreting the situation as Yayoi kissing Haruki.
12	"Building Twelve: The Bond Between Haruki and His Sisters"; Transliteration: "Jū Ni Gōtō Haruki to Shimai-tachi no Kizuna" (Japanese: 十二号棟 晴輝と姉妹達の絆)	N/A	September 25, 2015
Yayoi barges into Haruki's room requesting to play a game with him, something which initially makes Haruki nervous as she is not normally this gentle. However, as he goes to choose a game for them to play, he finds that she has fallen asleep on his bed. Yayoi remarks how she wants to sleep in his room, to which a panicked Haruki drags her back to her own bed, assuming she has some kind of fever. As he leaves, the twins drag him to the bathroom demanding that he watch them use the toilet, later calling it a prank. After some waterworks, Haruki finally returns to his room only to find Mutsuki sleeping in his bed. The others soon follow, claiming that they all want to sleep in his room for the night. As Haruki reflects on each member of his family and the good times he has had with them, he realizes that with his room packed and that he has nowhere to sleep. The next day, it is revealed that the reason they all slept in his room was due to watching a scary movie the night before.
OVA	"Building Thirteen: I Want to go to the Public Bath"; Transliteration: "Jū San Gōtō Sentō Yukitai ̄" (Japanese: 十三号棟 銭湯行きたいー)	"Princess Durandal"	September 18, 2015
The Nakano siblings head towards the public baths, with Uzuki and Satsuki looking forward to drinking bottled milk.

== Works cited ==
- "Ch." is shortened form for chapter and refers to a chapter number of the Danchigai manga
- "Ep." is shortened form for episode and refers to an episode number of the Danchigai anime
