= Roselia (band) =

Japanese band in BanG Dream! franchise

- Roselia in BanG Dream! Girls Band Party! From left to right: Lisa, Rinko, Yukina, Ako, Sayo

Background information
- Origin: Japan
- Genres: Alternative rock; J-pop; Gothic rock; anime song
- Years active: 2016–present
- Label: Bushiroad Music
- Spinoff of: BanG Dream!
- Members: Aina Aiba (Yukina Minato); Haruka Kudō (Sayo Hikawa); Megu Sakuragawa (Ako Udagawa); Kanon Shizaki (Rinko Shirokane); Yuki Nakashima (Lisa Imai)
- Past members: Yurika Endō; Satomi Akesaka
- Website: en.bang-dream.com/artists/roselia/

Roselia is a Japanese all-female alternative rock band that is part of Bushiroad's media franchise BanG Dream!. Formed in 2016, the group's members portray fictional characters in the project's anime series and mobile game BanG Dream! Girls Band Party! in addition to performing their characters' respective instruments in live concerts.

Roselia consists of Aina Aiba (vocals), Haruka Kudō (guitar), Yuki Nakashima (bass), Megu Sakuragawa (drums), and Kanon Shizaki (keyboard). In-universe, the band is represented by Yukina Minato (Aiba), Sayo Hikawa (Kudō), Lisa Imai (Nakashima), Ako Udagawa (Sakuragawa), and Rinko Shirokane (Shizaki). Yurika Endō and Satomi Akesaka, who respectively played the bass and keyboard as Lisa and Rinko, were part of the group's original lineup before leaving the franchise in 2018.

Of the twelve bands in BanG Dream!, Roselia is one of seven whose members perform their own music in concerts. The group has produced 13 singles and four albums.

== History ==
=== Early history (2016–2017) ===
Roselia first appeared at the Tokyo Game Show in September 2016 to promote the upcoming mobile rhythm game BanG Dream! Girls Band Party! Serving as special guests, the group consisted of Aina Aiba (Yukina), Haruka Kudō (Sayo), Yurika Endō (Lisa), Megu Sakuragawa (Ako), and Satomi Akesaka (Rinko). At the time, Roselia was one of two groups in the franchise whose members were voice actresses that could perform their characters' instruments live, joining Poppin'Party.

In February 2017, Roselia's live concert debut took place at BanG Dream! 3rd Live Sparklin'Party 2017 at Tokyo Dome City Hall, where they were introduced as secret guests. According to Endō, the band had practiced for approximately half a year prior to the show. The group played three songs: cover versions of the opening theme music to Neon Genesis Evangelion: Death & Rebirth and Steins;Gate, followed by the original piece "Black Shout". "Black Shout" (officially stylized in all caps) was released as the band's debut single on 19 April with the coupling track "Louder"; the single peaked at seventh on the Oricon Singles Chart. On 30 April, Roselia performed at Bushiroad's ten-year anniversary concert at Yokohama Arena alongside Poppin'Party, during which they played a second original piece "Re:birth day". The song would be released as Roselia's second single on 28 June, and topped at ninth on Oricon's weekly chart.

Roselia's first standalone live concert Rosenlied was on 30 June 2017 at Shibuya Duo Music Exchange; Rosenlied is German for "Song of the Rose", and the band's later shows and albums would also use German words as titles. Following an overwhelmingly positive reception, a second performance with the same name was held on 29 July at the larger Ariake Coliseum. In August, the band performed at Animelo Summer Live, where they played "Black Shout" and "Louder". Their third single "Passionate Starmine" (Note: English titles are from the English-language franchise website.) was released later in the month; it peaked at third on the Oricon Daily Chart and seventh in the weekly ranking. The single's coupling track "-Heroic Advent-" was used as the ending theme song for the anime Cardfight!! Vanguard G: Z. Their second concert Zeit ("time") was conducted at Makuhari Messe on 8 October. Ten days later, the Roselia-centric Internet radio show Radio Shout! began broadcast, with Kudō and Sakuragawa serving as hosts. A fourth single "Oneness" came out in late November.

In September 2017, Aiba and Kudō hosted a live talk panel at the Bushiroad-organized CharaExpo in Singapore. The following year, Roselia played a concert at CharaExpo USA 2018 in Anaheim, California alongside BanG Dream! bands Poppin'Party and Raise A Suilen. The three groups returned to the expo in 2019. Aiba was also a special guest at Anime Expo 2018 in Los Angeles, California, and Madman Anime Festival 2019 in Melbourne, Australia, to promote Girls Band Party!

The BanG Dream! anime began in 2017, in which Roselia appeared as characters. When Sanzigen, a computer-generated animation studio whose previous works were exclusively science fiction series, became the show's animator in 2018, they prepared for the second season by animating a music video for Roselia's song "Neo-Aspect". Roselia would also perform the season's theme music "Brave Jewel" and "Safe and Sound".

=== First album and departures (2018–2019) ===
The group's first album Anfang ("Beginning" in German), which contain their first five singles at the time, was released on 2 May 2018. The album sold 25,000 copies and was downloaded 5,510 times in its first week of release, enabling it to rank second on the Oricon Albums Chart and top the Oricon and iTunes digital album charts. By the end of the year, Anfang had approximately 45,266 sales, the 14th-most for an anime album in 2018. Singles released during the year included "Opera of the wasteland" (21 March, released in conjunction with Poppin'Party's "CiRCLING" for the franchise's first dual-release day), "R" (25 July), and "Brave Jewel" (12 December). The band would also perform the opening theme "Legendary" for Cardfight!! Vanguard.

In 2018, Endō and Akesaka left the band and franchise for medical reasons. Endō participated in her final concert with Roselia at the BanG Dream! 5th Live (subtitled Ewigkeit, German for "Eternity") on 13 May; her replacement Yuki Nakashima debuted at the show, and the two played together with the band as part of a six-person performance. "R" was the band's first single with Nakashima as Lisa. Akesaka's last event was the Roselia Fan Meeting 2018 at Culttzz Kawasaki on 17 September, and an open audition was conducted to find her replacement. On 7 November, the band's four members held a live titled Vier (German for "Four") at Shinagawa Stellar Ball, with Kanon Shizaki being announced as Roselia's new keyboardist shortly after. Endō and Akesaka's voice roles were also updated with Nakashima and Shizaki's in Girls Band Party!

Roselia's eighth single and first of 2019, "Safe and Sound", was one of six released by the franchise on 20 February (with each band producing a track). Every single ranked in the top ten in the Oricon Daily Chart for 19 February, with "Safe and Sound" being the highest in third. Another single "Fire Bird" came out in July. At the end of the year, music download store mora released a list of the site's most downloaded anime albums, with Roselia singles occupying three of the top ten positions ("Fire Bird" in fourth, "Brave Jewel" in ninth, and "Safe and Sound" in tenth).

The band returned to Animelo Summer Live in August 2019; in addition to playing three original songs, Roselia partnered with Konomi Suzuki for a cover of her song "This Game". Other shows during the year included the band's first outdoor performance Flamme/Wasser ("Flame/Water" in German) at Fuji-Q Highland Conifer Forest in August and the joint concert Rausch und/and Craziness with Raise A Suilen at Makuhari Messe in late November; a second Rausch live took place at Musashino Forest Sport Plaza in February 2020.

=== Second album and anime films (2020–present) ===
2020 saw Roselia's tenth single "Promise" be released on 15 January, followed by their second album Wahl six months later. Wahl, which ranked third on the Oricon Albums Chart, is German for "choice"; according to Aiba, the word symbolizes each member's decision to join the band, while the new songs on the album represent the actions taken by their respective characters. "Promise" would rank 87th on Billboard Japan's best-selling singles of 2020, while Wahl was 62nd and 67th on its best-selling albums and Hot Albums charts, respectively. In March, the band received the Singing Award from the 14th Seiyu Awards. Roselia's first concert of the year was Einheit (German for "United"), the first day of the BanG Dream! 8th Live at Fuji-Q Highland Conifer Forest, on 21 August; Aiba returned for the live's encore two days later alongside Raise A Suilen's Raychell and Poppin'Party.

"ZEAL of proud", the band's 11th single, was released on 20 January 2021; the titular song was later used as the opening for Cardfight!! Vanguard overDress. Rausch und/and Craziness II was held on 22 February at Yokohama Arena, and an online concert titled Rausch und/and Craziness -interlude- took place on 12 December 2020. A two-part film focusing on the band titled BanG Dream! Episode of Roselia—subtitled Promise and Song I am., both of which are the names of Roselia songs—opened in theaters in 2021; Promise premiered on 23 April, while Song I am. did so on 25 June. Roselia and Poppin'Party performed together at the BanG Dream! 9th Live, subtitled The Beginning, at Fuji-Q Highland Conifer Forest on 21–22 August. The two also performed at Animax Musix 2021 at Yokohama Arena on 20 November. Edelstein ("gemstone") took place on 11–12 December at the Nagoya Congress Center's Century Hall.

In 2022, Roselia collaborated with artist Eve for the song "Flashlight" (閃光, Senkō). The band's mini-album Rozen Horizon was released on 18 May. A two-day show titled Episode of Roselia, based on the movies of the same name and subtitled Weißklee ("white clover") and Rose, took place 21–22 May at Fuji-Q Highland Conifer Forest.

== Members ==
- Aina Aiba (Yukina Minato, vocals): When she joined the BanG Dream! franchise, Aiba had the least musical experience in the band. She was initially wary of portraying the stoic Yukina as she regards herself as having an "active" personality, but eventually committed to the role. Talking with Famitsu in 2020, she explained she tries to "express my secret feelings with a small expression and voice" as Yukina withholds her emotions when performing.
- Haruka Kudō (Sayo Hikawa, guitar): Kudō began playing guitar in high school; although she wished to make her stage debut as a singer, her live performances as Roselia's guitarist eventually contributed to singing opportunities. In live concerts, she plays an ESP M-II.
- Yuki Nakashima (Lisa Imai, bass): Officially described as the "sixth Roselia member", Nakashima made her debut at the BanG Dream! 5th Live. Excluding replacing Endō's lines in the game, her first voice acting role as Lisa came in the music video for "Neo-Aspect".
- Megu Sakuragawa (Ako Udagawa, drums): Sakuragawa began drumming in junior high school, but was not familiar with playing harder rock music prior to Roselia.
- Kanon Shizaki (Rinko Shirokane, keyboard): Shizaki was announced as Roselia's new keyboardist and Rinko's voice actress on 7 November 2018. Before joining the franchise, she had been playing the piano for 12 years.

Former members

- Satomi Akesaka (Rinko, 2016–2018): Akesaka grew up playing the piano but stopped as a teenager. In August 2018, the franchise announced she would leave the franchise (officially using the term "graduate") after being diagnosed with sensorineural hearing loss; she had suffered temporary hearing loss on two occasions in March, with concerts proving to be too much of a risk to continue. Her last event was the Roselia Fan Meeting 2018.
- Yurika Endō (Lisa, 2016–2018): Prior to Roselia, Endō had no experience with the bass. In December 2017, she announced she would retire from the entertainment industry in June 2018 due to declining health. Endō's last performance with Roselia was the BanG Dream! 5th Live, with her final show coming on 1 June.

== In-universe band ==
Band logo

Adhering to BanG Dream!'s premise of voice actresses performing their own music, Roselia's members portray characters in the anime and Girls Band Party! In a 2019 interview with Billboard Japan, Kudō and Sakuragawa noted the distinction of being a "voice actor's band" helped increase interest among audiences unfamiliar with either the game or show. Roselia is one of four bands in the franchise that performs their own live music along with Poppin'Party, Raise A Suilen, and Morfonica.

In the anime and game, Roselia is a popular band led by Yukina Minato whose skill has caught the attention of the music industry. A rock band with symphonic metal leanings, Roselia's shows are based on gothic-style and elaborate costumes and visuals. Their name is a combination of "rose" and "camellia", a reference to a blue rose as it represents the band's goals of achieving the impossible.

As Poppin'Party serves as the anime's protagonists, Roselia plays a minor role in the first season where they perform at live house Space's final concert. The two bands later share a co-starring role in the show's beach-oriented original video animation, with Roselia's "Passionate Starmine" being used as the episode's ending theme. Roselia receives additional focus in the second season as they host a self-sponsored show and support Poppin'Party's plans to organize their own. The third season follows Roselia's participation in the Girls Band Challenge competition alongside Poppin'Party and Raise A Suilen.

In Girls Band Party!'s main story, the band is one of four groups recruited by the player character and Poppin'Party to participate in the titular event. The game's Roselia-centric band stories follow the group's formation in "Bloom of the Blue Rose", their efforts to rediscover their pride after a falling-out in "Neo-Aspect", and their aspirations of going professional in Sprechchor. The first two band stories and the "Noble Rose" event story trilogy are also covered in Episode of Roselia.

A manga by Pepako Dokuta focusing on the band titled BanG Dream! Girls Band Party! Roselia Stage ran in Overlap's online manga magazine Gardo Comics from February to September 2017. The series is licensed for North American release by Tokyopop.

In August 2020, Roselia collaborated with the mobile game Lost Decade as its voice actresses served as guest hosts of the in-game radio show and their characters became playable.

== Discography ==
As of 6 January 2025, Roselia has 50 original songs. Elements Garden's Asuka Oda serves as the primary lyricist for the band's tracks, doing so for all but two songs, while other members of Elements Garden like Noriyasu Agematsu and Ryutaro Fujinaga provide arrangement and composition.

In addition to Anfang and Wahl, Roselia has collaborated with the other BanG Dream! bands for cover song compilation albums known as Cover Collections; in June 2020, the BanG Dream! Girls Band Party! Cover Collection Vol. 4 topped Oricon's Weekly Albums Chart. Five live albums with the band's concerts have also been released. The Blu-ray releases of the Episode of Roselia, both released on 15 December 2021, were bundled with original songs; Song I am. peaked at fourth on Oricon's Blu-ray Disc Chart while Promise was one spot lower.

=== Singles ===
Year	Title	Coupling track (Note: Instrumental versions of both songs are also included.)	Release date	Peak Oricon chart position	Notes	Ref
2017	"Black Shout" (Note: Officially stylized in all caps.)	"Louder"	19 April	7		
2017	"Re:birth day"	"Sunkissed Rhodonite" (陽だまりロードナイト, Hidamari Rhodonite)	28 June	9		
2017	"Passionate Starmine" (熱色スターマイン, Nesshoku Starmine)	"-Heroic Advent-"	30 August	7		
2017	"Oneness"	"Determination Symphony"	29 November	8		
2018	"Opera of the wasteland"	"Our Path" (軌跡, Kiseki)	21 March	5		
2018	"R"	"Black Shout" (remastered), "Neo-Aspect" (remastered)	25 July	3		
2018	"Brave Jewel"	"Sanctuary"	12 December	3	Anime second season opening theme	
2019	"Safe and Sound"	"Passionate Anthem"	20 February	3	Anime second season ending theme	
2019	"Fire Bird"	"Ringing Bloom"	24 July	5		
2020	"Promise" (約束, Yakusoku)	"'UNIONS' Road"	15 January	5		
2021	"ZEAL of proud"	"Blessing Chord"	20 January	2		
2022	"Swear ～Night & Day～"	"Our Carol"	26 October	4		
2023	"Throne of Rose"	"Dear Gleam", "The Sole Full Glory" (一逢のFull Glory, Ichie no Full Glory)	26 April	4		
2023	"Violet Line"	"Call the shots", "Sunlit Musical"	13 December	6		
2024	"Flower Crown as a Cornerstone" (礎の花冠, Ishizue no Hanakanmuri)	"Frontier Fantasia"	11 December	5		
2025	"Dazzle the Destiny"	"Grateful Meeting"	26 June	6		
2025	"Requiem for Fate"	"Second to None"	26 June	5		
2025	"Steadfast Spirits"	"Purple Blaze" (紫炎, Shien)	19 November	4		
2026	"Fear Nothing"	"Talk to my Tone"	April 29	5		

=== Albums ===
Year	Title	Release date	Peak Oricon chart position	Notes	Ref
2018	Anfang	2 May	2		
2018	BanG Dream! Girls Band Party! Cover Collection Vol. 1 (バンドリ！ ガールズバンドパーティ！ カバーコレクション Vol.1)	27 June	6	Joined by Poppin'Party, Afterglow, Pastel Palettes, and Hello, Happy World! (Note: Also joined by Raise A Suilen (Cover Collection Volumes 3 and 4) and Morfonica (Volume 4).)	
2019	BanG Dream! Girls Band Party! Cover Collection Vol. 2 (バンドリ！ ガールズバンドパーティ！ カバーコレクション Vol.2)	13 March	6	Joined by Poppin'Party, Afterglow, Pastel Palettes, and Hello, Happy World!	
2019	"BanG Dream! FILM LIVE" Insert Song Collection (「BanG Dream! FILM LIVE」劇中歌コレクション)	25 September	16	Joined by Poppin'Party, Afterglow, Pastel Palettes, and Hello, Happy World!	
2019	BanG Dream! Girls Band Party! Cover Collection Vol. 3 (バンドリ！ ガールズバンドパーティ！ カバーコレクション Vol.3)	18 December	4	Joined by Poppin'Party, Afterglow, Pastel Palettes, and Hello, Happy World!	
2020	BanG Dream! Girls Band Party! Cover Collection Vol. 4 (バンドリ！ ガールズバンドパーティ！ カバーコレクション Vol.4)	27 May	1	Joined by Poppin'Party, Afterglow, Pastel Palettes, and Hello, Happy World!	
2020	BanG Dream! Girls Band Party! Cover Collection Special Selection (バンドリ！ ガールズバンドパーティ！カバコレ Special Selection)	1 June	—	Roselia's cover of "Soul's Refrain" featured as one of five in album (Note: Joined by Poppin'Party, Afterglow, Pastel Palettes, and Hello, Happy World!)	
2020	Wahl	15 July	3		
2020	Garupa Vocaloid Cover Collection (ガルパ ボカロカバーコレクション)	16 December	4	Joined by Poppin'Party, Afterglow, Pastel Palettes, Hello, Happy World!, Raise A Suilen, and Morfonica	
2021	BanG Dream! Girls Band Party! Cover Collection Vol. 5 (バンドリ！ ガールズバンドパーティ！ カバーコレクションVol.5)	24 February	6	Joined by Poppin'Party, Afterglow, Pastel Palettes, Hello, Happy World!, Raise A Suilen, and Morfonica	
2021	"BanG Dream! Episode of Roselia" Theme Songs Collection	30 June	3		
2021	"BanG Dream! FILM LIVE 2nd Stage" Special Songs	25 August	13	Joined by Poppin'Party, Afterglow, Pastel Palettes, Hello, Happy World!, Raise A Suilen, and Morfonica	
2021	BanG Dream! Girls Band Party! Cover Collection Vol. 6 (バンドリ！ ガールズバンドパーティ！ カバーコレクションVol.6)	10 November	4	Joined by Poppin'Party, Afterglow, Pastel Palettes, Hello, Happy World!, Raise A Suilen, and Morfonica	
2022	BanG Dream! Dreamer's Best	16 March	6	Fan vote-determined compilation album with Roselia's "Fire Bird", "R", and "Ringing Bloom" included	
2022	Rozen Horizon	18 May	6	Two versions released with different cover songs: "Synchrogazer" (A) and "The Monster With No Name" (B)	
2022	BanG Dream! Girls Band Party! Cover Collection Vol. 7 (バンドリ！ ガールズバンドパーティ！ カバーコレクションVol.7)	14 December	13	Joined by Poppin'Party, Afterglow, Pastel Palettes, Hello, Happy World!, Morfonica, and Raise A Suilen	
2024	Für Immer	26 June	5		
2026	Lehre der Rose	August 26	7	Compilation album for the band's 10th anniversary	

=== Live albums ===
Year	Title	Release date	Peak Oricon chart position	Notes	Ref
2019	Roselia 2017–2018 LIVE BEST -Soweit-	6 November	6		
2019	BanG Dream! 6th☆LIVE	27 November	10	Joined by Poppin'Party, Raise A Suilen, and Hello, Happy World! (Note: Joined by Afterglow, Pastel Palettes, and Glitter Green for 7th☆LIVE.)	
2020	TOKYO MX presents 「BanG Dream! 7th☆LIVE」COMPLETE BOX	19 February	3	Joined by Poppin'Party, Raise A Suilen, and Hello, Happy World!	
2020	TOKYO MX presents「BanG Dream! 7th☆LIVE」 DAY1：Roselia「Hitze」	19 February	6		
2020	Roselia x RAISE A SUILEN "Rausch und/and Craziness"	18 November	3	Joined by Raise A Suilen	
2021	Poppin'Party x SILENT SIREN VS Live "NO GIRL NO CRY" at MetLife Dome	28 April	17	Supported Poppin'Party and Silent Siren, joined by Raise A Suilen	
