= BanG Dream! Girls Band Party! =

2017 rhythm mobile game

- English logo
- Developers: Craft Egg (2017–2024); Bushiroad (2024–present) (Note: Rocket Studio developed the Nintendo Switch version.)
- Publishers: JP/WW: Bushiroad; TW/HK/MAC: Mobimon Inc.; CHN: bilibili; KR: Kakao Games
- Composer: Elements Garden
- Series: BanG Dream!
- Engine: Unity
- Platforms: Android, iOS; Nintendo Switch
- Release: Android, iOS: JP: March 16, 2017; TW/HK/MAC: October 19, 2017; KR: February 6, 2018; WW: April 4, 2018; CHN: May 30, 2019; Nintendo Switch: JP: September 16, 2021
- Genres: Rhythm game, visual novel
- Modes: Single-player, multiplayer

BanG Dream! Girls Band Party!, (Note: Japanese: バンドリ！ ガールズバンドパーティ！, Hepburn: Bandori! Gārusu Bando Pāti!) also known as Garupa, is a mobile rhythm game developed by Craft Egg and published by Bushiroad for the Android and iOS platforms. Part of Bushiroad's BanG Dream! music franchise, it was released in Japan in March 2017, and worldwide in April 2018. The game was also released by Mobimon Inc. in Hong Kong, Macao, and Taiwan in October 2017, by Kakao Games in Korea in February 2018, and by bilibili in mainland China in May 2019. A Nintendo Switch port of the game was released in Japan in September 2021; unlike the free-to-play mobile version, it is a premium game.

Girls Band Party! has enjoyed success in Japan and worldwide, and is credited with helping the franchise grow in popularity. A spin-off anime series based on the game titled BanG Dream! Girls Band Party! Pico began airing in 2018. Another spin-off featuring the 8 bands playable in-game, as well as Ave Mujica and Mugendai Mewtype, 'Ganso! BanG Dream-chan' began airing online in 2025.

== Plot ==
The game's setting mainly follows the BanG Dream! universe after the anime's first season. Girls Band Party! consists of the main story, band stories, and event stories, each of which are split into seasons.

In the main story's first season, the player character is a self-named worker at the live house CiRCLE who is tasked by fellow staff member Marina Tsukishima with recruiting groups for the Girls Band Party event. Poppin'Party, the franchise's main band, assists the player in their scouting, during which they enlist the groups Roselia, Afterglow, Pastel Palettes, and Hello, Happy World! The second season focuses on CiRCLE's plans to host a second Girls Band Party.

Band stories individually focus on the bands. Poppin'Party has four such stories: the first, "Poppin'Party is Born!", is a retelling of their formation from the anime's first season; the second, "Colorful, Poppin' Candy", details the band's efforts to save the downtown festival; "Double Rainbow" centers on an argument between the five when keyboardist Arisa Ichigaya finds herself compounded by her studies and commitment to the band; "Live Beyond!!" focuses on the band's participation in the Rocking Star Festival and desire to spread their music. Afterglow's first two band stories "Afterglow, The Same As Always" and "Tied to the Skies" follow vocalist Ran Mitake's growth, including rebelling against her disapproving father in the former and her relationship with her bandmates as she progresses as a person in the latter, while the third "One of Us" tells of the band's efforts to play in a music event. Pastel Palettes' disastrous debut concert and attempts to change their reputation are covered in "Pastel Palettes, The Beginning", while "Luminous Once More" discusses the members' dreams and goals and "Title Idol" introduces a sister idol unit. Roselia's creation is detailed in their first story "Bloom of the Blue Rose", "Neo-Aspect" follows their efforts to rediscover their pride after a falling-out, and the band ponders its future in "Sprechchor". Hello, Happy World!'s first two stories "Smiles To The World! Hello, Happy Union!" and "I Need You!" focus on their plans to cheer up an injured friend of the band and restoring an old amusement park, respectively, and the band's third "Smile Connection!" follows their trip to a foreign country. The first band stories for Morfonica and Raise A Suilen discuss their formations, the latter of which is a retelling of BanG Dream! 3rd Season. Morfonica's second, "Fly with the night", concerns violinist Rui Yashio's future with the band, while RAS' "Coruscate -DNA-" revolves around band leader Chiyu Tamade and her family.

Events, in which players compete with one another for the highest total score during a given time period, are complemented by stories. Examples of event stories include "Sakura Blooming Party!", where the first-year students convene for a sakura viewing party, and "A Song Unfinished", in which Roselia's vocalist Yukina Minato struggles to perform a song her father had written.

== Gameplay ==
Gameplay in Multi Live mode. The top left bar contains the cumulative score of the multiplayer team, while skill activation is denoted with cut-ins of the respective character.

Girls Band Party!'s gameplay consists of tapping notes as they slide toward the bottom to the rhythm of a chosen song; such notes exist as taps, drag notes that players must hold, flick notes, and special yellow notes that activate character skills and lines mid-performance. Players are given 1,000 health points to clear a song, but one can adjust song speed, difficulty level, and note size to their liking. In lieu of an energy system that is prevalent in most free-to-play games, Girls Band Party! utilizes Live Boosts that increases rewards for completing a song, and players can continue playing even when they run out of boosts.

Songs are generally one minute and 30 seconds in length, though full-length tracks for some tracks are available. In 2019, the game introduced a music video feature that replaces the in-game background with clips from the anime such as opening themes and performances. Some songs were created by the winning bands in the game's General Election, a series of voting contests based on a certain topic. For example, the second election mixed the bands' members to form different units; the winning group (High School Part Time Workers) resulted in the song "You're Not Alone", which would be used as an insert song in the anime's second season.

Besides original songs, cover versions of popular music by the five bands are also playable. The addition of cover songs was inspired by their positive reception during BanG Dream!'s first live concerts, with franchise creator Takaaki Kidani comparing them to the use of mainstream series in Bushiroad's Weiß Schwarz card game as "drops in momentum" are canceled out by "the addition of popular titles." The international versions also have region-exclusive tracks: in 2018, the Korean server partnered with K-pop group GFriend to include their songs "Me Gustas Tu" and "Time for the Moon Night", while the English game featured Pinkfong's "Baby Shark" and daniwellP's "Nyan Cat" for a limited time. Duet covers between the bands and the original artists, such as Poppin'Party performing "Days of Dash" with Konomi Suzuki, are categorized as "Extra" songs.

Certain covers were spawned from collaborations between BanG Dream! and other franchises. The Vocaloid project, the video game series Persona, and the anime Is the Order a Rabbit?, Re:Zero − Starting Life in Another World, A Certain Scientific Railgun T, Ojamajo Doremi, Zombie Land Saga, Tokyo Revengers, That Time I Got Reincarnated as a Slime, Chainsaw Man and Oshi no Ko have partnered with Girls Band Party!, which includes covers by the bands and special character costumes. The Zombie Land Saga collaboration featured an appearance from ZLS character Kotaro Tatsumi, whose voice actor Mamoru Miyano reprised his role to become the game's first voiced male character.

Players gain experience points (EXP) by clearing songs and listening to overworld conversations between characters. Characters are fully voiced with 2.5D movement via Live2D technology, and their interactions are depicted in a visual novel-style presentation. Further dialogues can be attain by improving cards and attaining more EXP. EXP also improves a band's rank, which unlocks additional chapters in band stories. Cards, which use a star ranking system to determine rarity (five stars being the rarest), are acquired via the gacha system, a luck-based mechanic in which players spend the in-game currency Stars with the hope of winning their desired cards. Although Girls Band Party! is a free-to-play game, players can spend real-life money to acquire more stars.

The game's multiplayer, known as Multi Live, is a cooperative mode in which five players try to record a high cumulative score. During performances, the team can earn more points when they maximize a "Fever Chance" combo bar and enter "Fever" mode. Player versus player multiplayer modes are also available such as VS Live and Team Live, the latter of which is a five-on-five format.

During the game's anniversaries in March, new content is added and the main story is updated. The second anniversary in 2019 saw the introduction of an overworld lounge that features new character interactions and animations. The following year, Raise A Suilen and Morfonica were added as playable bands, while new gameplay mechanics included Live2D animation during lives and a "rehearsal" mode that allows players to practice songs without fearing health depletion. The fourth anniversary introduced the Team Live mode, character birthday gacha cards, and sideways flick notes. Stage Challenge, a game mode in which players are restricted to certain band lineups and progress by attaining target scores, and multiplayer music video functionality were implemented in 2022. A "super-large update" took place for the six-year celebration with the addition of a third Main Story season, five star rarity, and 3D animated videos for fan-voted songs.

== Development ==
BanG Dream! was formed in 2014 by Bushiroad head Takaaki Kidani, whose company had enjoyed success with the rhythm game Love Live! School Idol Festival. Bushiroad reached out to CyberAgent's Craft Egg, who agreed to create a BanG Dream! game after expressing interest in the franchise's premise of voice actresses capable of playing their own instruments. After initially considering a simulation or puzzle game, Craft Egg CEO Shuichi Morikawa opted to frame it as a music game. To differentiate Girls Band Party! from competing titles in the genre, Craft Egg included cover songs, which was inspired by Poppin'Party's usage of such music in its live concerts, and made it free to play. Kō Nakamura, who created the story for BanG Dream! and the lyrics for Poppin'Party's original songs, had no involvement in writing the game's storyline.

Development of the game ran from August to November 2016, with hopes of releasing it in coordination with the anime's broadcast in March 2017. The game was created using the Unity engine. It was officially announced on September 15, 2016, at Tokyo Game Show, where Roselia's members made their debut. The other vocalists Ayane Sakura (Afterglow's Ran), Ami Maeshima (Pastel Palettes' Aya Maruyama), and Miku Itō (Hello, Happy World!'s Kokoro Tsurumaki) were officially confirmed during a presentation on December 7 at Sunshine City, Tokyo, while Afterglow's voice actresses revealed their involvement with the project on Twitter during the month. The remaining cast members were revealed during a show at EX Theater Roppongi to promote the game on February 24, 2017.

In-game character dialogue is recorded in groups, such as between band members, to allow for a natural atmosphere in conversations. When Yurika Endō (Lisa Imai) and Satomi Akesaka (Rinko Shirokane) departed the franchise, their successors Yuki Nakashima and Kanon Shizaki re-recorded their characters' lines; conversely, Maeshima's voice acting for Aya remains in the game after her exit and replacement.

Pre-registration opened on January 1, 2017; Kidani heavily encouraged others to pre-register when the anime, which began airing that month, received mediocre reviews. By the game's launch in March, over 560,000 players had completed the process. Closed beta testing launched on February 17.

On December 18, 2023, it was announced that Craft Egg would no longer be involved as co-developers as of January 4, 2024. Bushiroad took over development.

== Release and marketing ==
2018 game trailer starring Kenny Omega

The game was first released in Japan on March 16, 2017. Mobimon Inc. published a traditional Chinese-language version in Hong Kong, Macao, and Taiwan which was released on October 19. A Korean server by Kakao Games went live on February 6, 2018. An English global version was first launched in Singapore on March 29, 2018, followed by a worldwide release on April 4. Mainland China would receive its own server by bilibili on May 30, 2019.

An augmented reality application based on the game titled BanG Dream! Garupa AR! was distributed for a limited period starting January 9, 2018. In 2019, Girls Band Party! partnered with SCRAP Co. to organize "Find the Random Star!", an escape room-like game in which participants search for Kasumi Toyama's lost guitar by solving riddles located throughout the city. The event ran from December 4, 2019, to February 29, 2020, in Tokyo, Nagoya, and Osaka.

Various promotional events have been held to support the game. On January 13–14, 2018, the franchise's five bands participated in the Garupa Live and Garupa Party! at Tokyo Big Sight, which included a tournament and performances. In 2019 and 2020, the game was a title sponsor for New Japan Pro-Wrestling's Wrestle Kingdom 13 and 14; Kenny Omega, then a wrestler for Bushiroad-owned NJPW, starred in a commercial for the game. Actor Toshihiro Yashiba, actress Marie Iitoyo, and YouTubers Hikakin and Fischer's have also starred in advertisements for Girls Band Party! A joint commercial between Girls Band Party! and the movie Ao-Natsu, the latter of which featured a cameo appearance from Aimi of Poppin'Party, aired in June 2018 and starred the film's lead roles Wakana Aoi and Hayano Sato.

In May 2018, Girls Band Party! partnered with Sega's arcade rhythm game Ongeki to include the vocalists as playable characters and opponents in the latter; songs from BanG Dream! are also available. A collaboration with fellow smartphone game Lost Decade took place in August 2020 where Roselia's voice actresses appeared in Lost Decade's in-game radio show and the band's characters became attainable. In April 2022, PuraOre! Smile Princess had an event co-starring Poppin'Party in which players could attain gacha cards with the band members.

BanG Dream! Girls Band Party! Pico, a chibi anime series by Sanzigen, premiered on July 5, 2018. A spin-off from the main BanG Dream! anime, Pico has produced two additional seasons in 2020 and 2021. Bushiroad and Kadokawa Corporation also released an anthology series manga called BanG Dream! Garupa Pico Comic Anthology, which features comics from 17 artists, on March 14, 2019. A manga adaptation of the event stories, titled BanG Dream! Girls Band Party! The First Page, was released on March 16, 2021.

To celebrate the game's fifth anniversary, a two-part animation from Sanzigen titled BanG Dream! Girls Band Party! 5th Anniversary Animation: CiRCLE Thanks Party! was released on March 10 and 17, 2022. On October 11, 2023, the Korean server announced that it will cease operations on January 31, 2024. As gifts, all players on the server were given 450,000 Stars and 800 Boost Drinks to use.

During Anime Expo 2024, Bushiroad, along with some of their other series, had specific stalls to promote their works, including a stall dedicated to BanG Dream!, which had demos of Girls Band Party! available to play.

== Nintendo Switch port ==
On February 28, 2021, Bushiroad announced a Nintendo Switch port. Rocket Studio assisted in developing the port. A demo was launched on August 5 ahead of its release in Japan on September 16. Unlike the mobile game which is free-to-play, the Switch version is a premium game.

In addition to the traditional touchscreen mechanics via the Switch's handheld mode, the game can be played on a television using the Joy-Con controllers; a special difficulty level is reserved for Joy-Con gameplay. Unlike the microtransactions in the mobile version, the Switch game allows players to acquire cards by collecting tickets earned by playing the game and reading the stories. Cards from the mobile game are also ported with the exception of those from collaborations. At its release, the in-game universe was set in the main story's first season. Content from the second season, including Morfonica and Raise A Suilen, were added via downloadable content on January 27, 2022.

According to Bushiroad executive Kazuhiko Hirose, the port was created to appeal to demographics outside the mobile gaming market. Comedian and bodybuilder Nakayama Kinnikun assisted in promoting its release with a series of online commercials.

== Reception ==
BanG Dream! Girls Band Party! has garnered positive reviews, with ComicsVerse's Jessica Liong regarding it as "arguably the most popular" animated aspect of the franchise. Speaking with Real Sound in 2018, Kidani remarked "everything just went through the roof" after the game's release, noting its "level of polish" was among the factors that helped the franchise gain popularity.

In a 2018 review for ComicsVerse, Hayden Moseley noted the game grants "too much freedom" for players, which is beneficial for those experienced with rhythm games but the contrary for newcomers. Despite this, he suggested much of its appeal comes from the interactions between characters, comparing it to "watching a playable anime." He also praised GBP for its "complex" but "rewarding and incredibly fun" gameplay, concluding that "the music and the girls are completely worth exploring." Describing it as "a super sweet rhythm game", Elizabeth Henges of XDA Developers listed GBP as one of the best Android games of 2020 and wrote that although the gacha system "can be annoying at times", one "can easily get by without spending money, and playing online with friends is a blast."

In Japan, the game surpassed four million downloads in its first six months following release; by November 2019, it had over 11 million Japanese players. It grossed ¥31.2 billion ($284.28 million) between 2017 and 2018, including ¥9.1 billion in 2017 and ¥22.1 billion in 2018. In 2018, the game was the 15th most successful mobile game and the second-most successful rhythm game in Japan in terms of revenue, only behind The Idolmaster Cinderella Girls: Starlight Stage. The game's worldwide English server exceeded one million downloads in two months, followed by reaching ten million in August 2018.

GBP has received awards in Japan like the App Store's "Top Game Ranking" and Google Play's "Grand Prize for Players' Choice Game and Attractive Game" in 2017.
