= Satomi Akesaka =

Japanese voice actress

- 明坂 聡美
- Born: January 2, 1988 (age 38); Saitama, Japan
- Occupations: Actress; voice actress
- Years active: 2004–present
- Agent: Amuleto
- Musical career
- Genre: J-pop
- Instruments: Vocals; keyboards
- Years active: 2005–2018

Satomi Akesaka (明坂 聡美, Akesaka Satomi) (born January 2, 1988) is a Japanese actress, voice actress and former singer affiliated with the Amuleto talent agency. She voiced main characters Hina Satou in Tesagure! Bukatsu-mono, Taeko Nomura in Coppelion, Mutsuki in Danchigai, krkr in Gdgd Fairies, Teruha Andō in Girls Beyond the Wasteland, Yūki Asano in Kyo no Gononi, Miho Edogawa in Level E, and Natsume in Master of Martial Hearts. She also voices supporting characters such as: Esdeath in Akame ga Kill!, Varda in Engage Planet Kiss Dum, Mari Kurokawa in Gate, Arsene in Tantei Opera Milky Holmes, Miho in Suzuka, Kanon in Pretty Rhythm and Rinko Shirokane in BanG Dream! (2017–2018).

On June 30, 2018, it was announced that Akesaka would retire from singing due to sudden hearing loss and left Roselia on September 17. However, she remained involved in the industry by continuing her voice acting work.

On May 4, 2026, Akesaka announced on Twitter that she had married someone not in the entertainment industry.

== Filmography ==
=== Anime ===
2015

- Urawa no Usagi-chan, Tokiwa Kamikizaki
- Danchigai, Mutsuki Nakano

2018

- BanG Dream! Girls Band Party! Pico, Rinko Shirokane

2020

- Diary of Our Days at the Breakwater, Makoto Ōno
- Muhyo & Roji's Bureau of Supernatural Investigation Season 2, Rio Kurotori

2021

- Vivy: Fluorite Eye's Song, Grace

2022

- Musasino! as Tokiwa Kamikizaki
- Reiwa no Di Gi Charat, Brocco-desu

2023

- Summoned to Another World for a Second Time, Loa

2024

- I Was Reincarnated as the 7th Prince so I Can Take My Time Perfecting My Magical Ability, Talia

2025

- A Wild Last Boss Appeared!, Benetnasch

=== Original video animation (OVA) ===
- Indian Summer (2007), Minori, Theme Song Performance (ED)

=== Video games ===
- DC Super Hero Girls: Teen Power, Star Sapphire / Carol Ferris
- Xenoblade Chronicles 3, Ghondor
- Tevi, Lunessa
- Dejiko Radio (2008)
- Puella Magi Madoka Magica: Magia Exedra, Koito Asako
