= Haruka Kudō (voice actress) =

Japanese voice actress

- 工藤 晴香
- Born: March 16, 1989 (age 37); Osaka, Osaka Prefecture, Japan
- Other name: KudoHaru
- Occupations: Voice actress; singer
- Years active: 2005–present
- Height: 151 cm (4 ft 11 in)
- Website: https://kdharoom.com/

Haruka Kudō (工藤 晴香, Kudō Haruka; born March 16, 1989) is a Japanese voice actress, singer, and guitarist. She is best known as the voice of Hagumi Hanamoto in Honey and Clover, Haruka Kaminogi in Noein: To Your Other Self, and Sayu Yagami in the anime adaptation of Death Note. Kudō also portrays Sayo Hikawa in the BanG Dream! franchise, which includes playing guitar for the band Roselia.

== Career ==
She worked for Top Coat and was an exclusive model for Seventeen Japan from 2003 to 2006. Kudō appeared in 2007 No.15. She was originally a reader model for magazines such as CUTiE. The manager of the Top Coat era scouted her after seeing her photo in a magazine.

She debuted as a voice actress in 2005 as Hagumi Hanamoto in the TV anime Honey and Clover. She was a reader of the original manga for the same work, and was surprised when offered an audition.

After graduating from university, she moved away from performing arts activities and her contract with Top Coat expired on the end of September 2007. Thereafter she started working as a voice actress in earnest and belonged to Sigma Seven in 2011.

In August 2014, she left Sigma Seven and became a freelance.

She joined ELBS Entertainment from October 2016. Later in the year, she joined the BanG Dream! music franchise as guitarist for the band Roselia, which included portraying the fictional character Sayo Hikawa.

On May 1, 2017, she announced on her official blog that she would transfer to Ace Crew Entertainment.

On February 11, 2020, she announced her solo singer debut on Twitter. By March 25, 2020, she debut as a singer and songwriter on her mini-album, KDHR.

== Filmography ==
=== Anime television series ===
- Noein - To Your Other Self – Haruka Kaminogi
- BanG Dream! – Sayo Hikawa
- Honey and Clover – Hagumi Hanamoto
  - Honey and Clover II – Hagumi Hanamoto
- Death Note – Sayu Yagami
- Nodame Cantabile – Gorota in PuriGorota
- Hunter × Hunter (2011) – Ponzu
- From the New World – Mamoru Itō (12 years old)
- The World is Still Beautiful – younger Livius I
- Soreike! Anpanman – Poppochan
- Captain Earth – Setsuna
- Cardfight!! Vanguard G: GIRS Crisis – Luna Yumizuki
  - Cardfight!! Vanguard G: Stride Gate – Luna Yumizuki
- Bungo Stray Dogs – Yumeno Kyūsaku

=== Anime film ===
- Pretty Guardian Sailor Moon Cosmos The Movie (2023) – Sailor Heavy Metal Papillon

=== Video games ===
- BanG Dream! Girls Band Party! – Sayo Hikawa
- Tales of the World: Radiant Mythology – Kanonno
- Tales of the World: Radiant Mythology 3 – Pasca Kanonno
- The Sky Crawlers: Innocent Aces – Maumi Orishina
- Revue Starlight: Re LIVE – Yachiyo Tsuruhime

=== Others ===
- Asahi Broadcasting Nagano – Ringo-maru
- Nodame Cantabile (live-action drama) – Gorota in PuriGorota

== Discography ==
=== Albums ===
	Release date	Title	Package number		Oricon peak ranking
	Release date	Title	CD + M-Card	CD Only	Oricon peak ranking
1	March 30, 2022	流星列車	CRCP-40640 (Type-A)	CRCP-40641 (Type-B)	25

=== Mini-albums ===
	Release date	Title	Package number		Oricon peak ranking
	Release date	Title	CD + M-Card	CD Only	Oricon peak ranking
1	March 25, 2020	KDHR	CRCP-40600 (Type-A) / CRCP-40601 (Type-B)	CRCP-40602 (Type-C)	14
2	October 7, 2020	POWER CHORD	CRCP-40608 (Type-A) / CRCP-40609 (Type-B)	CRCP-40610 (Type-C)	

=== Remix Albums ===
	Release date	Title	Package number		Oricon peak ranking
	Release date	Title	CD + M-Card	CD Only	Oricon peak ranking
1	January 26, 2022	KDHRemix	-	CRCP-40634	-
