= Yurika Endō =

- 遠藤 ゆりか
- Born: June 24, 1994 (age 32); Tokyo, Japan
- Other name: Yurishii
- Occupations: Voice actress; singer
- Years active: 2013–2018
- Agent: Swallow
- Height: 157 cm (5 ft 2 in)
- Musical career
- Genres: J-pop; anison
- Instruments: Vocals; bass
- Label: Pony Canyon

Yurika Endō (遠藤 ゆりか, Endō Yurika; born June 24, 1994) is a former Japanese voice actress and singer from Tokyo, Japan. After starting her career in 2013, she began playing supporting roles in anime series such as Ace of Diamond, Magimoji Rurumo, and Sakura Trick. In 2017, she played the roles of Nozomi Momijidani in the anime series Angel's 3Piece! and Lisa Imai in the multimedia franchise BanG Dream!.

Endō is part of the vocal unit Yuri*Kari together with fellow Swallow voice actress Karin Takahashi. She also became part of the bands Baby's Breath and Roselia as part of her participation in Angel's 3Piece and BanG Dream! respectively. She also appeared at anime conventions in Southeast Asia and Hong Kong. In December 2017, for health reasons, she announced her retirement from the entertainment industry following the release of an album in May 2018 and a solo live concert in June 2018.

== Biography ==
Endō was born in Tokyo, Japan, on June 24, 1994. From an early age, she had dreamed of becoming a voice actress and singer, and she had become interested in anime due to watching series such as Ojamajo Doremi and Cardcaptor Sakura. Her desire to become an entertainer was also bolstered by her interest in anime and manga, which she maintained during her high school years. While in high school, she became part of a band that performed covers of anime music.

While still a high school student, Endō joined the 6th Animax Anison Grand Prix contest, where she became a finalist. Following this, afterwards, she decided to participate in an audition held by the media company Pony Canyon. She won the grand prize at the audition, and she became affiliated with the voice acting agency Swallow. She was then paired with fellow newcomer voice actress Karin Takahashi as the vocal unit Yuri*Kari. Endō debuted in the entertainment industry as a singer, performing with Takahashi the song "Kimi to Futari" (君と二人), which was used as the ending theme to the 2013 anime series The Severing Crime Edge. That same year, she made her debut as a voice actress, playing the role of Haruno Yoshikawa in the anime television series Ace of Diamond.

In 2014, Endō released her first solo single "Monochrome Overdrive", the title track of which was used as the ending theme to the anime series Z/X Ignition, where she plays the role of Aina Mikage. The single was written and composed by Hisashi, the lead guitarist of the band Glay. She also played the roles of Rina Sakai in Sakura Trick and Tanako Kujirai in Magimoji Rurumo. Her second single, "Futari no Chrono Stasis" (ふたりのクロノスタシス, Futari no Kurono Sutashisu; lit. '"Our Chrono Stasis") was released on August 6, 2014, and is used as the ending theme to Magimoji Rurumo.

In 2015, Endō made an appearance at Anime Festival Asia Indonesia and Anime Festival Asia Singapore. In 2017, she was cast as the character Lisa Imai in the multimedia franchise BanG Dream!, where she became part of the band Roselia. She was also cast as the character Nozomi Momijidani in the anime series Angel's 3Piece!, where she became part of the band Baby's breath, and as the character Mitsuki Gero in the multimedia project Onsen Musume.

On December 18, 2017, Endō announced that for health reasons, she would retire from the entertainment industry in 2018. Her final overseas appearance was at C3 AFA Hong Kong in February 2018, while her last appearance as part of Roselia was on May 13, 2018. She released a compilation album titled Emotional Daybreak on May 9, 2018, while her final activity as an entertainer was a solo live concert that took place at Akasaka Blitz on June 1, 2018.

== Filmography ==
=== TV anime ===
- Ace of Diamond (2013–15), Haruno Yoshikawa
- Magimoji Rurumo (2014), Tanako Kujirai
- Sakura Trick (2014), Rina Sakai
- Z/X Ignition (2014), Aina Mikage
- Ace of Diamond: Second Season (2015–16), Haruno Yoshikawa
- Rilu Rilu Fairilu (2016), Haruka (ep 13)
- BanG Dream! (2017), Lisa Imai
- Angel's 3Piece! (2017), Nozomi Momijidani

=== Web anime ===
- Comical Psychosomatic Medicine (2015), Asuna Kangoshi
- Kaiju Girls (2016), Reika Shiragane / Windom

== Discography ==
=== Singles ===
Release date	Title	Peak Ranking
February 5, 2014	Monochrome Overdrive (モノクロームオーバードライブ, Monokurōmu Ōbādoraibu)	41
August 6, 2014	Futari no Chrono Stasis (ふたりのクロノスタシス, Futari no Kurono Sutashisu; lit. Our Chrono Stasis)	55
April 6, 2017	Melody and Flower	40
