= BanG Dream! Girls Band Party! Pico =

Japanese chibi anime series

- Promotional art for the first season
- Genre: Comedy; Music
- Created by: Bushiroad
- Anime television series
- Directed by: Seiya Miyajima
- Written by: Kō Nakamura
- Music by: Ryota Suemasu; Noriyasu Agematsu; Junpei Fujita
- Studio: Sanzigen; DMM.futureworks; Scooter Films
- Original network: Tokyo MX, SUN, YouTube
- Original run: July 5, 2018 – December 27, 2018
- Episodes: 26
Further information
Anime television series
BanG Dream! Girls Band Party! Pico: Ohmori
Directed by	Seiya Miyajima
Written by	Kō Nakamura
Music by	Ryota Suemasu; Noriyasu Agematsu; Junpei Fujita
Studio	Sanzigen; DMM.futureworks; Scooter Films
Original network	Tokyo MX, SUN, YouTube
Original run	May 7, 2020 – October 29, 2020
Episodes	26
Anime television series
BanG Dream! Girls Band Party! Pico Fever!
Directed by	Seiya Miyajima
Written by	Kō Nakamura
Music by	Ryota Suemasu; Noriyasu Agematsu; Junpei Fujita
Studio	Sanzigen; DMM.futureworks; Scooter Films
Original network	Tokyo MX, SUN, YouTube
Original run	October 7, 2021 – March 31, 2022
Episodes	26
- icon

BanG Dream! Girls Band Party! Pico, (Note: Japanese: バンドリ！ ガールズバンドパーティ！☆ピコ, Hepburn: Bandori! Gāruzu Bando Pāti! ☆ Piko) stylized as BanG Dream! Girls Band Party! ☆ PICO and also known as Garupa ☆ Pico, is a Japanese chibi short anime series by Bushiroad. Animated by Sanzigen in collaboration with DMM.futureworks, it is a spin-off of the main BanG Dream! series with characters from the mobile game BanG Dream! Girls Band Party!. As of 2021, the show consists of three seasons.

== Series overview ==
Season	Episodes	Originally released	
Season	Episodes	First released	Last released
1	26	July 5, 2018	December 27, 2018
2	26	May 7, 2020	October 29, 2020
3	26	October 7, 2021	March 31, 2022

== Episodes ==
=== BanG Dream! Girls Band Party! Pico (2018) ===
No.	Title	Original release date
1	"Live House CiRCLE"; Transliteration: "Raibu Hausu "Sākuru"" (Japanese: ライブハウス「さーくる」)	July 5, 2018
During a stormy night at the CiRCLE live house, Marina is visited by five all-girl bands: Afterglow, Pastel Palettes, Hello, Happy World!, Roselia, and Poppin'Party. However, due to the building being too crowded to accommodate all 25 members, they leave to eat at a restaurant.
2	"Think Tank"; Transliteration: "Kuratō̄̄̄ku" (Japanese: くらトーーーーク)	July 12, 2018
After having just three fans at their latest concert, Poppin'Party proposes various gimmicks to attract more attendance. Unfortunately for Arisa, her bandmates' absurd ideas—which range from Tae bringing her rabbits onstage to Kasumi flying across the stage from the rafters—come to fruition.
3	"Revolution"; Transliteration: "Kakumei-revolution-" (Japanese: 革命-revolution-)	July 19, 2018
After watching Poppin'Party execute their stunts in their most recent concert, Roselia decides to base their latest song and theme on the motif of "revolution". During Roselia's strategy meeting in CiRCLE's studio, Afterglow and Michelle interrupt before quickly leaving with an apology. Roselia eventually performs in a single outfit that holds all five members together, to the confusion of the audience.
4	"Rock n' Roll Baby"; Transliteration: "Rokku n Rōru Beibeー" (Japanese: ロックンロールベイベェ)	July 26, 2018
While reading fan comments, Tsugumi notices she is the only Afterglow member without any reviews. She receives inspiration from a death metal band and decides to dress in a similar fashion; although the ensuing performance goes well, Ran runs away after expressing her dismay with the image change. Demotivated, Tsugumi resumes her search for ideas before spotting a Pastel Palettes video.
5	"Pastel＊Palettes' Swimsuit Commercial"; Transliteration: "PasuPare Mizugi de Komāsharu" (Japanese: パスパレ・水着deコマーシャル)	August 2, 2018
Pastel Palettes participates in a swimsuit commercial to raise publicity. However, the ad's activities consist of extreme stunts including hanging from a bar while answering questions about one another and sliding a surfboard as close to a cliff as possible without falling.
6	"Welcome to Michelle Land!"; Transliteration: "Missheru Lando e Yōkoso!" (Japanese: ミッシェル ランド ヘ ようこそ！)	August 9, 2018
During lunch with her Hello, Happy World! bandmates, Misaki is asked where she believes Michelle lives, so she tries to improvise and answers Michelle Land. To her surprise, Kokoro's family eventually constructs an amusement park of the same name. In Michelle Land, Misaki—dressed as Michelle—gets lost within the crowd of other Michelle mascots, with another Michelle leaving the park with the band.
7	"CiRCLE Joint Concert Conference"; Transliteration: "Sa-kuru Go-do- Raibu Taisaku Kaigi" (Japanese: さーくる合同ライブ対策会議)	August 16, 2018
The five bands hold a meeting to discuss a joint concert at CiRCLE. When Kasumi fails to provide an apt explanation, the girls begin offering clashing ideas including band order and slogans. With the conference making little progress, Kasumi invites everyone to a restaurant.
8	"Drummers Gotta Drum"; Transliteration: "Doramu- tte Itsumo Nankashira Rizumu Kizan deru yo ne" (Japanese: ドラマーっていつも何かしらリズム刻んでるよね)	August 23, 2018
At a family restaurant, the bands' drummers (Sāya, Maya, Kanon, Tomoe, and Ako) discuss their struggles compared to guitarists, including not being able to carry their drums around. After browsing for snare drum cases online, the five order their food, but when Tomoe orders pancakes instead of ramen, the waitress interprets their ensuing conversations as ramen for everyone.
9	"For the Love of Chocolate Cornets"; Transliteration: "Chokokorone Daisuki" (Japanese: チョココロネだいすき)	August 30, 2018
During lunch times, Rimi repeatedly eats chocolate cornets, prompting Tae to joke that if she continues to eat them, she will turn into one herself. As the days pass, Rimi's addiction worsens until she attempts to eat a snail shaped like a cornet. Eventually, true to Tae's words, she turns into a cornet before she wakes up, realizing it was a nightmare.
10	"What About the Garlic?"; Transliteration: "Ninniku Dō Shimasu?" (Japanese: ニンニクどうします？)	September 6, 2018
Moca and Ran wait in line to eat at a ramen restaurant, during which they banter about various matters.
11	"Hello, Happy Sky Jam"; Transliteration: "HaroHapi Sukai Raibu" (Japanese: ハロハピ スカイ ライブ)	September 13, 2018
Kokoro convinces Hello, Happy World! to perform while skydiving. However, Kaoru faints mid-air due to her fear of heights, while Michelle and Kanon struggle to keep up. As they near landing, the band release their parachutes except for Michelle, who realizes her backpack was only carrying their instruments.
12	"Babanbo, Hear My Prayers"; Transliteration: "Babanbo-sama Ni Onegai☆"" (Japanese: ババンボ様にお願い☆)	September 20, 2018
Ran falls sick, prompting Afterglow to test various remedies. However, their combined cures reach extreme levels, with Moca eventually telling of a tribe that prays to a god to ward off colds (which are apparently the work of demons). Although Ran eventually recovers, she does not recall anything from her sickness.
13	"Twinkling Joyful Shopping District Frenzy Bushido Party"; Transliteration: "Kirakira Yukaina Shouten-gai Kyouran no Bushido- Pa-ti" (Japanese: キラキラ愉快な商店街狂乱のブシドーパーティ)	September 27, 2018
Marina, Misaki, Sayo, Rimi, Tsugumi, and Maya are tired after spending the night planning the joint concert until the rest of the bands arrive for rehearsals and re-energize them. The concert, while a success, sees the bands commit to the antics from their respective episodes. During the afterparty, Marina announces the concert will be the final performance at CiRCLE before its closing.
14	"Hello, Happy's Winter Mountain Hike"; Transliteration: "HaroHapi Gentōki Yukiyama Jūsō" (Japanese: ハロハピ厳冬期雪山縦走)	October 4, 2018
Inspired by Hagumi, Hello, Happy World! embarks on a mountain hike to little success. Stuck in the cold, the five settle down at a patch, but fail to find a source to start a fire as they had all brought their instruments. Instead, Misaki reveals Michelle has a built-in heating system, which the band huddles around.
15	"Part Time Job"; Transliteration: "Baito no Jikan" (Japanese: バイトの時間)	October 11, 2018
While working at their part-time job, Moca and Lisa talk about CiRCLE's closing and other matters, including Lisa seeing the deity responsible for treating Ran.
16	"Poppin' Shuffle"; Transliteration: "Poppin' Shaffuru" (Japanese: ポッピン'シャッフル)	October 18, 2018
After finishing practice, Poppin'Party is preparing to leave when Kasumi slips on the stairs and drags everyone down. Upon returning home, the five realize they have swapped bodies, forcing them to reconvene. When Kasumi (now in Arisa's body) suggests living their lives as their new identities, an angry Arisa (in Rimi) attacks her by repetitively head-butting her in an effort to get her mind back into her body until Rimi (in Sāya) intervenes, causing them to once again fall down the stairs and repossess their original bodies. Arisa is initially relieved until she opens her phone and sees Kasumi's antics in her body.
17	"Pastel＊Stroll"; Transliteration: "Pasuteru＊Sanpo" (Japanese: パステル＊散歩)	October 25, 2018
For a television program, Pastel Palettes wanders around town and visit each store, including Sāya's bakery, Tsugumi's coffee house, and Hagumi's butcher's shop. Sāya, Tsugumi, and Hagumi each offer free helpings of their respective stores' foods, though Pastel Palettes struggles to eat them all.
18	"Basement Maze"; Transliteration: "Zō Meikyū" (Japanese: 蔵迷宮)	November 1, 2018
Poppin'Party goes to Arisa's basement for practice, but the room is littered with cardboard boxes due to her grandmother ordering too many. The boxes form a maze that the four attempt to traverse before getting lost; Tae tries to solve the situation with a trail of breadcrumbs, but Rimi (due to her coronet obsession) picks them up, unaware of Tae's intention. When they return to their original spot, the girls decide to leave before Kasumi notices star stickers along the walls that lead them to Arisa. However, they decide to leave after noticing the time. Although Arisa comments the stickers will guide them to the exit, Kasumi (having grown obsessed with them) had peeled them off.
19	"CiRCLE's Collapse"; Transliteration: "Sa-kuru no Hōkai" (Japanese: さーくるの崩壊)	November 8, 2018
The girls are worried about CiRCLE's closing, which Lisa recalls is due to the structural damage their performances caused. They vent their frustrations by hitting walls and the floor, unknowingly causing the downstairs stage to collapse with Marina inside.
20	"Truth-Seeing Demon Eye"; Transliteration: "Shinjitsu wo Utsusu Mame" (Japanese: 真実を映す魔眼)	November 15, 2018
While snowed inside a cabin, Ako, Eve, Himari, Kasumi, Marina, Ran, and Rinko discover Tomoe has been knocked out with a hit to the head. When Ako tries to investigate the matter like a detective, Ran nonchalantly leaves while the others deny responsibility; as a result, Ako pins the crime on Ran. With the case supposedly solved, the girls return to business until they are once again individually attacked, with Rinko revealing herself as the culprit. As it turns out, Ako is presenting the story as a possible theme for their next concert, though Ran questions her whereabouts.
21	"That Performance Sure Would Be Exciting"; Transliteration: "Ano Enshutsutte Wakuwaku Suru yo ne" (Japanese: あの演出ってワクワクするよね)	November 22, 2018
On her way to practice, Yukina spots a stray cat that she eventually takes with her, eventually adding more to her group. Although Sayo ends up petting them anyway, she and Lisa order Yukina to return them. When she notices a cat-eared shadow around a corner, it is revealed they are the buns in Kasumi's hair, with the girl in question being recruited into Roselia before Sayo rejects her.
22	"Welcome to Michelle Cafe!"; Transliteration: "Missheru Kafe e Yōkoso!" (Japanese: ミッシェルカフェヘようこそ！)	November 29, 2018
Marina is busy repairing CiRCLE and also runs the live house's cafe due to a lack of staff. The girls volunteer their help to the latter, and the cafe is eventually rebranded to a Michelle theme to attract more customers. While working a chainsaw, Marina accidentally saws a rope connecting a giant Michelle head to the roof, which rolls over and crushes her.
23	"Pastel's Pajama Party"; Transliteration: "Pasuteru Pajama Pātī" (Japanese: パステルパジャマパーティー)	December 6, 2018
Pastel Palettes holds a sleepover. Unsure of what to do, Maya decides to tell a ghost story that scares Eve; when Hina, Aya, and Chisato start doing the same, Eve hides under a blanket. As a prank, the rest of the band turn off the lights and hide outside her room. When they return to reveal it was a joke, a terrified Eve brandishes a samurai sword and attempts to attack them (either out of paranoia, believing that they're ghosts, or out of anger for pranking her).
24	"Twin Rhythm"; Transliteration: "Futago Rizumu" (Japanese: フタゴリズム)	December 13, 2018
Sayo tries to leave to practice with Roselia but Hina attempts to hold her back, wanting to spend time with her. At the fast food restaurant that Aya and Kanon work at, Hina considers inviting Sayo to eat French fries with her, during which Sayo struggles to practice due to her hunger. When Hina starts eating a box of fries that she ordered, every bite she takes makes Sayo even more hungry, and when the front door opens for another customer, Hina catches a brief cold and sneezes, during which Sayo sneezes simultaneously. Perplexed by Sayo's behavior, Yukina dismisses her for the day. As she returns home, she meets up with Hina, who offers her fries.
25	"Christmas Eve Surprise"; Transliteration: "Seiya no Sapuraizu" (Japanese: 聖夜のサプライズ)	December 20, 2018
On Christmas Eve, Marina continues repairing the roof until she notices the bands organizing a Christmas party. The girls reminisce about their time at CiRCLE, with Yukina, Sayo, Ran, and Kasumi hyping them for the joint concert. Outside, Kokoro and Michelle use a snow machine on the roof, which eventually collapses and destroys the building.
26	"Reconstructed"; Transliteration: "Saiken Shichatta" (Japanese: 再建しちゃった)	December 27, 2018
Although Kokoro and Michelle escape the ruins, the girls express worry at the concert's fate. However, Kasumi senses the live house is salvageable and discovers the underground stage is still intact. Together, the bands clean up the wreckage and prepare for the performance. The concert is a success, though when everyone jumps, their landing causes water to blast from the stage. Eventually, CiRCLE is reopened as a hot spring.

=== BanG Dream! Girls Band Party! Pico: Ohmori (2020) ===
No.	Title	Original release date
1	"Live House CiRCLE"; Transliteration: "Raibu Hausu "Sākuru"" (Japanese: ライブハウス「さーくる」)	May 7, 2020
While Poppin'Party is practicing at CiRCLE, Marina trips over a glowing object embedded in the floor. Said object produces a bright light before Kasumi pulls it out, revealing it to be an odd, guitar-shaped artifact. Government interest in the artifact leads to the construction of a research facility over CiRCLE, leading to confusion from the bands as they try to find the live house.
2	"Poppin'Pastry"; Transliteration: "Poppinpan" (Japanese: ポッピンパン)	May 14, 2020
At Yamabuki Bakery, Poppin'Party strategizes over new pastry ideas, which turns out to be more difficult than expected. Kasumi suggests creating a "Poppin'Pastry" in which the five combine their favorite foods, but the final product is a Hamburg steak set.
3	"Lisa Couture"; Transliteration: "Risakore" (Japanese: リサコレ)	May 21, 2020
Lisa comes to practice drenched from the rain, prompting her to change into a tracksuit found in a storage box. Curious, the rest of Roselia offer her other outfits to try on, much to her eventual exhaustion.
4	"Himari SOS!"; Transliteration: "Himari esuōesu!" (Japanese: ひまりSOS！)	May 28, 2020
Himari tries to go on a diet, though food withdrawals distract her during practice. Afterglow decides to help her exercise to lose weight, but they gradually include food in her workouts. In the end, Himari's weight never changes.
5	"Pastel＊Desert"; Transliteration: "Pasuteru＊Sabaku" (Japanese: パステル＊砂漠)	June 4, 2020
Pastel Palettes goes through a desert on their way to CiRCLE, during which Aya collapses while Maya tries to look for help. The heat causes her to see mirages of an oasis and her drums before also fainting, and her bandmates find her actually dreaming the desert scenario due to the talent agency studio's heater being on.
6	"Misaki Madness"; Transliteration: "Misaki Kindanshōjō" (Japanese: 美咲禁断症状)	June 11, 2020
Michelle gets burned by pyrotechnics during a Hello, Happy World! concert, to Misaki's relief as she no longer has to wear it. However, her withdrawal from being the mascot causes her to break down until she starts attacking anything bear-shaped. When the Michelle costume is finally repaired, it is destroyed again, this time by electrocution.
7	"New Epithets"; Transliteration: "Aratanafutatsuna" (Japanese: アラタナフタツナ)	June 18, 2020
Morfonica is wandering around a dark CiRCLE when Raise A Suilen crashes through the windows. Each RAS member is introduced with a nickname, though Chiyu is dismayed at hers. When Morfonica expresses interest in having their own sobriquets, the original five bands' vocalists show up and assign them names, to Mashiro and Tsukushi's chagrin.
8	"Cardfight!! Sister!"; Transliteration: "Kādofaito!! Onēchan!" (Japanese: カードファイト!! お姉ちゃん！)	June 25, 2020
Asuka and Ako have a duel in a manner similar to Cardfight!! Vanguard over their older sisters, which Rokka attempts to quell. However, Hina intervenes by summoning Sayo, leading to the three—and the world—being overwhelmed.
9	"Puzzle ☆ Pico"; Transliteration: "Pazuru ☆ Pico" (Japanese: パズル☆ピコ)	July 2, 2020
The girls are used as pieces in a tile-matching video game, with the playing space being cleared whenever they are grouped together by band. At one point, the player get a combo with Poppin'Party and Roselia. By the end, the girls come in too fast, filling up the screen, causing a game over.
10	"Hanazono Street Live"; Transliteration: "Hanazono Rojō Raibu" (Japanese: ハナゾノ路上ライブ)	July 9, 2020
Tae is conducting a street performance when Rei offers to play together. Sayo and Rinko subsequently show up and ask to join in. Although Tae wishes for a drummer, the group instead adds another guitarist and keyboardist in Moca and Tsugumi, followed by Michelle with balloons. To Tae's disappointment, it is not until the concert ends that a drummer (Tomoe) finally arrives.
11	"Under the Tea"; Transliteration: "An'ya Tītaimu" (Japanese: 暗晦ティータイム)	July 16, 2020
Himari, Maya, Rimi, Hina, Yukina, Kokoro, and Masuki find themselves in the dark with no recollection of how they got there. Upon finding a light switch, they notice they are inside a submarine stocked with tea leaves and biscuits (Though they initially believe that they're in an aquarium that Masuki works at). While the others enjoy the food, Masuki attempts to leave the submarine, but discovers they are in Antarctica.
12	"The Girls Band Times"; Transliteration: "Gāruzubando Shinbun" (Japanese: ガールズバンド新聞)	July 23, 2020
Much to Marina's annoyance, a newspaper called The Girls Band Times repeatedly smashes through CiRCLE's windows. Sāya, Himari, Maya, Lisa, and Misaki are surprised when they read the paper and discover their past events are being covered. Needing more money to repair the damage, Marina becomes a newspaper delivery person and breaks Kasumi's window while throwing one.
13	"CiRCLE Customer Attraction Conference"; Transliteration: "Sākuru Shūkyaku Taisaku Kaigi" (Japanese: さーくる集客対策会議)	July 30, 2020
With nobody able to find CiRCLE, the girls propose having a concert to raise awareness. Although the show is a success and interest skyrockets when it is streamed online, people still do not know where the live house is. After the live, Kasumi visits a cavern under CiRCLE with a mysterious monolith.
14	"Got a Haircut?"; Transliteration: "Kamikitta?" (Japanese: 髪切った？)	August 6, 2020
Poppin'Party is surprised to see a three-dimensional Marina, which she attributes to her recent visit to the salon for a haircut. The six eat lunch, during which the band remarks she looks like a "model from a different dimension", before leaving for practice.
15	"Roselia Online"; Transliteration: "Roselia Onrain" (Japanese: ロゼリアオンライン)	August 13, 2020
Roselia embarks on a quest in Neo Fantasy Online, though they use each other's accounts. Due to character class differences, they struggle to adapt to their new roles as Rinko (in Lisa's account) and Ako (in Yukina's) try to lead them. Upon regrouping with Sayo (in Rinko's), the band mounts a final charge but is unceremoniously defeated by the floor boss.
16	"noodlee!journey!"	August 20, 2020
After practice, Afterglow decides to get something to eat. Tomoe proposes a ramen shop, albeit located in a seedy part of town, which unnerves Ran and the others. Next time, they agree to visit a cafe, though Tomoe's suggested destination is another ramen store. As the cycle of events repeat a third and fourth time, Himari suggests visiting a place with sweet food to buck the trend; to her chagrin, Tomoe leads them to a restaurant that sells ramen with whipped cream.
17	"Magic Morphin' Pastel＊Rangers"; Transliteration: "Mahō Sentai Pasuteru＊Renjā" (Japanese: 魔法戦隊パステル＊レンジャー)	August 27, 2020
Pastel Palettes gets summoned to fight monsters in a Super Sentai style, though they gradually lose members to work obligations with each battle until only Aya is left. Nevertheless, Pareo is excited for the next episode.
18	"Michellebot, Go!"; Transliteration: "Hasshin! Missheru-Robo" (Japanese: 発進！ミッシェルロボ)	September 3, 2020
Upon spotting a Marie Andromeda mecha, Kokoro deploys the Michellebot. The two robots begin battle, but the ensuing damage (which includes Michellebot shaking an occupied office building in a test of strength before the robots attempt to charge up their final attacks) prompts Kanon to question the reasons for fighting in the first place. Upon hearing her plea, the two sides quickly make amends.
19	"Mashiro Station"; Transliteration: "Mashiro Sutēshon" (Japanese: ましろステーション)	September 10, 2020
Morfonica notices Mashiro is the only one not present, and a phone call with her reveals she fell asleep on the train ride to the meeting destination. When she woke up, she arrived at an unknown station that none of the others know of, which prompts Nanami to recall an urban legend of disappearing at an abandoned stop. After the band's attempts to trace her location fail, Mashiro spots a train with her bandmates on board, to their confusion.
20	"Tuna"; Transliteration: "Maguro" (Japanese: マグロ)	September 17, 2020
The bassists find themselves on a fishing boat after Hagumi mistakes a bass fishing line for a bass guitar string. Himari recalls from a television program that tuna fishing boats may not return until they catch one, so the five strive to do so themselves. Chisato eventually reels in a large tuna, which the group successfully catch.
21	"Kaoru Onstage"; Transliteration: "Kaoru Onsutēji" (Japanese: 薫オンステージ)	September 24, 2020
Himari and Rimi attend Kaoru's play about Momotarō. The two and the crowd gush over Kaoru's performance as she plays every character, though the story differs from the original folklore. When the show ends, Himari and Rimi are leaving when they encounter Kaoru, who offers to take them out for millet dumplings.
22	"The Toyama Expedition"; Transliteration: "Toyama tanken-tai" (Japanese: 戸山探検隊)	October 1, 2020
A massive jungle has covered Arisa's house that Poppin'Party—plus Chiyu and Reona from a distance—enters. When they get lost, Tae uses a chocolate cornet like a compass as it points north, but its spinning calibration hypnotizes Rimi into becoming a catgirl and running off with it. Kasumi, Sāya, and Tae continue their search until they finally reunite with Rimi and Arisa, the latter of whom is trimming branches as the recent weather had caused her bonsai to greatly enlarge. As the band goes inside to practice, Chiyu and Reona are caught by vines.
23	"Maruyama＊Channel"; Transliteration: "Maruyama Chaneru" (Japanese: まるやまチャンネル)	October 8, 2020
Aya becomes an online video celebrity and tries to perform various stunts like creating slime (though her mother only lets her make a small bowl), attempting to walk through a haunted tunnel (which she opts out at the last minute), and drinking a vegetable smoothie after messing up a tongue twister (with no reaction to its flavor). Chisato watches the videos, but is dismayed at Aya's poor performances.
24	"One Lump or Two?"; Transliteration: "Oshatō ikutsu iremasu ka?" (Japanese: お砂糖いくついれますか？)	October 15, 2020
Chisato goes to Hazawa Coffee for a meeting with a friend, but encounters Kaoru at a nearby table. Although she tries to ignore Kaoru, the long delay in her friend's arrival reveals Kanon is lost again, prompting Kaoru to help out by guiding her via phone call. When Kanon finally makes it to the coffee shop, Kaoru remarks her satisfaction with seeing Chisato panicking, leading to the two calling each other by their childhood nicknames.
25	"She's Missing"; Transliteration: "Inaku Natchatta" (Japanese: いなくなっちゃった)	October 22, 2020
While Marina is lamenting her inability to find CiRCLE due to urban development, Arisa bursts into Hazawa Coffee searching for Kasumi, who has gone missing. The band girls split up to look for her, which includes going through locations in previous episodes and setting up a trap with stars, rice, and French fries (that catches Hina instead). In a post-credits scene, Arisa gets a phone call from Kasumi, who is revealed to be at CiRCLE and having taken the guitar artifact.
26	"The Star Beat"; Transliteration: "Wakusei (Hoshi) no Kodō" (Japanese: 惑星（ホシ）の鼓動)	October 29, 2020
Kasumi leads the girls to a cavern beneath CiRCLE, where she explains the artifact had called them to perform. The bands organize and play a show, but when they conclude it by jumping at the same time, they cause the stage to rise up until the live house becomes a tower. When later lives take place at CiRCLE, it has become the tallest ancient ruins tower in Japan.

=== BanG Dream! Girls Band Party! Pico Fever! (2021–22) ===
No.	Title	Original release date
1	"The Warring Girls Band Period"; Transliteration: "Gāruzubando Sengoku Jidai" (Japanese: ガールズバンド戦国時代)	October 7, 2021
Parodying the Sengoku period (based on Sengoku Basara), the seven bands are introduced as warring groups vying for control of CiRCLE. In reality, when Kasumi and Poppin'Party arrive at the live house, Marina is struggling to reserve their studio due to the other bands trying to get in.
2	"Hiking Hiya"; Transliteration: "Haikingu Yaho" (Japanese: はいきんぐやっほー)	October 14, 2021
While on a mountain hike, Poppin'Party has a lunch break until the weather starts to turn stormy. As they head down, the mist makes it difficult to see, during which they hear a thundering sound. The five run away in panic but Arisa trips on a tree root, causing the group to tumble and fall over. Upon recovering, they realize the noise was Michelle punching a tree as part of martial arts training (dressed up as Ryu from Street Fighter), to everyone's disbelief (and relief).
3	"In the Satisfaction of Sportsmanship"; Transliteration: "Supōtsumanshippu ni Hokkori" (Japanese: スポーツマンシップにほっこり)	October 21, 2021
A clerical error by Marina results in Poppin'Party (represented by Kasumi and Tae), Pastel Palettes (Maya and Hina), Roselia (Lisa), and Hello, Happy World! (Hagumi and Kanon) all having the studio reserved at the same time. To determine who gets to practice, the five band girls play rock paper scissors but draw every time. Drawing from a suggestion box produced by Marina, they play sports like dodgeball, basketball, and kabbadi, though they continue to tie. Having enjoyed their games, they decide to go on a run, leaving Marina to wonder about the studio.
4	"Hey! Spring of Emotion"; Transliteration: "Emoina no Izumi" (Japanese: エモイナの泉)	October 28, 2021
In the form of a variety show, Moca invites the other members of Afterglow to share emotional stories. Tsugumi, Tomoe, and Himari each recall events that all feature Ran getting embarrassed, to said person's bewilderment, which are ranked by their emotional impact. Moca simply presents a photo of Ran as a child, which the three quickly declare the winner. Ran attempts to protest but is met with her bandmates stating their love for her; before Ran could comment, Moca ends the "show".
5	"Find Jennifer!"; Transliteration: "Jenifā-chan o Sagase!" (Japanese: ジェニファーちゃんを捜せ！)	November 4, 2021
Chisato receives a text from a friend saying her pet Jennifer has gone missing. Eve, Maya, Sāya, and Tae offer to help find Jennifer, but when Chisato draws a picture of the pet for reference, her poor artistic skills result in a deformed four-legged creature. The four present various animals such as Sāya finding a cat, Tae finding a grasshopper (which obviously scares Chisato due to her fear of bugs), Maya finding a goat, and Eve finding a jellyfish (which causes Chisato to quickly warn her to get rid of it before it stings her) before Sāya (jokingly) shows up with a potato shaped like a rabbit (prompting a dismayed Chisato to scold Sāya into taking the situation seriously). Tae finds a being that looks exactly as depicted in the drawing, though Chisato points out it is also not Jennifer. The friend eventually texts her again to confirm that Jennifer has been found, and the group expresses relief at the pet being a normal dog.
6	"Produce☆Galaxy"; Transliteration: "Purode~yūsu ☆ Ginga" (Japanese: プロデュース☆銀河)	November 11, 2021
Hoping to attract more customers to Galaxy Ramen after a rival chain restaurant opens nearby, Masuki consults Raise A Suilen for promotional ideas. Chiyu and Rei respectively suggest a planetarium and free rice, both of which are rejected as being too obvious while the latter is already offered; Masuki also turns down Rokka's idea of having Poppin'Party perform due to the store's small size. Reona comments on the popularity of cosplay restaurants (after accidentally showing an article about the discovery Chisato's drawing creature from the previous episode), which Masuki decides to try. The concept, which consists of Masuki dressing in a bunny costume and serving rabbit-themed ramen, proves to be a massive success.
7	"Himari's SNS Wars"; Transliteration: "Himari no SNS WARS" (Japanese: ひまりのSNS WARS)	November 18, 2021
Himari posts a photo of a cake on Twitter, which garners more interactions than Aya's omurice but less than Tōko's cup noodles, motivating her to boost her social media presence. The three post about topics like new clothes and attending events, but Himari continues to lose to Tōko while Aya's tweets have few reactions. When she notices Tōko's tweet about being scared of a bug, Himari deduces that the best way to go viral is to do something that she fears. Himari's ensuing tweet of her bungee jumping goes viral, but is outperformed by Aya's post at a haunted house when her followers notice a ghost in the background of her photo.
8	"The Pastel＊Palettes Dish"; Transliteration: "THE Pasupare Disshu" (Japanese: THE パスパレ DISH)	November 25, 2021
Hoping to create the perfect omurice, Pastel Palettes begins farming rice at a paddy field. When the band struggles to till the soil, Chisato motivates them by eating the dirt to test its viability. Upon planting the rice but encountering a drought, they perform a rain dance to produce the water. At night, Aya is distressed about the fields before the others inspire her by comparing the rice's journey to the band's. In the end, the five enjoy their rice.
9	"Running Down a Dream"; Transliteration: "Kakenukero Seishun" (Japanese: 駆け抜けろ青春)	December 2, 2021
Yukina and Lisa discuss using the Haneoka Girls' High School marathon as a method to improve their stamina for concerts, which Ran remarks as unnecessary. A slighted Yukina challenges Ran to a race and they immediately sprint as the marathon begins. Himari and Tomoe jog together, but the former falls back while trying to start a conversation, and Tomoe catches up to Moca and Lisa—who were talking about their jobs—before she realizes she left Himari behind. At the finish, an exhausted Ran and Yukina walk to the line as they commend each other, and finish the marathon together before collapsing.
10	"The Black La Vie en Note"; Transliteration: "Shikkoku no Ravuian Nōto" (Japanese: 漆黒のラヴィアンノート)	December 9, 2021
Ako spots a notebook on the ground while leaving CiRCLE, which is revealed to be Mashiro's that she had lost. The book's dark content engrosses the chūnibyō Ako, who reads lines from it aloud in school. Mashiro struggles to find the book before discovering Ako with it, though Ako refuses to turn over "The Black La Vie en Note" until Mashiro proves her ownership. Mashiro acquiesces and recites a verse in a chūnibyō style, which draws Ako's admiration but deeply embarrasses her. (Trivia: The notebook's appearance is similar to that of the titular black notebook from Death Note.)
11	"Mashiro the Worrywart"; Transliteration: "Shinpai-sei no Mashiro-chan" (Japanese: 心配性のましろちゃん)	December 16, 2021
After a show, Morfonica prepares to depart when Mashiro decides to stay behind to let the moment sink in. The next day at school, she asks Rui, Tsukushi, and Tōko what the band did following the concert, though they give vague answers that raises suspicion; Mashiro attempts to confront Nanami after school, though she runs away before Mashiro could question her. Mashiro theorizes the band's performance went poorly, prompting the others to replace her with a new vocalist with Mashiro being sent to a labor camp if she intervenes. Expecting to be kicked out of the group when Tōko calls her back to school, Mashiro is instead greeted with a congratulatory party organized by her bandmates, causing her to break down in tears.
12	"Jerky Adventure"; Transliteration: "Jākī Adobenchā" (Japanese: ジャーキーアドベンチャー)	December 23, 2021
Rei spots Reona in hiking gear, who explains she is on a quest to find the ideal jerky for Chiyu. A skeptical Rei follows her to North America, where they climb a mountain range in search of the "Golden Bison"; though a stone tablet reveals said bison is extinct, Reona deciphers that its jerky is at "Golden Rock" in continental Asia. Upon reaching the location and scaling its mountain, they find out the bison's jerky is actually the nest of the "Golden Bird" at the summit, but it turns out to be advertising for the Golden Farms poultry farm. The two return to Japan, where Reona spots beef jerky for sale at the airport, which Chiyu ultimately enjoys.
13	"Seven Bands in a Joint Concert of Dreams!"; Transliteration: "7 Bando, Yume no Gōdō Raibu!" (Japanese: 7バンド、夢の合同ライブ！)	December 30, 2021
The seven bands prepare for their joint live, aptly called the "Poppin'AfterPastelRoseHelloMoniRASConcert", with many of the girls alluding to their respective earlier episodes such as Aya, Himari, and Tōko posting about it on social media. Likewise, each band's performance reflects a past episode as Poppin'Party's is Sengoku themed, Michelle performs martial arts alongside Hello, Happy World!, Afterglow dons game show buttons, Roselia is exercising, Pastel Palletes is dressed as rice farmers and accompanied by Chisato's "Jennifer" creature, Raise A Suilen wears rabbit costumes, and Mashiro recites lines from "The Black La Vie en Note" to mixed responses from Morfonica. After the show, Kasumi approaches Marina, who is sitting alone after receiving a phone call earlier in the day, to which Kasumi narrates that the bands do not realize something major will happen to CiRCLE.
14	"Training Camp Sonata"; Transliteration: "Penshon Andante" (Japanese: ペンションアンダンテ)	January 6, 2022
Roselia holds a training camp at a mansion. A brief power outage prompts Ako to remark their situation resembles a horror game, though the comment is not unfounded as oddities take place such as Lisa's room door closing by itself and the grand piano in the lobby playing on its own. When Sayo fails to show up after the five reconvene, they begin searching the building in a manner similar to the Resident Evil series to no avail. Yukina accidentally activates a secret passage by leaning against a statue. They follow a trail of what appears to be blood to Sayo, who is revealed to simply be eating French fries with ketchup. Ako hears the piano play again and assumes it is Rinko, though she is perplexed upon realizing Rinko had been accompanying the group.
15	"Poppin'Moni Movie"; Transliteration: "PopiMoni Rōdoshō" (Japanese: ポピモニロードショー)	January 13, 2022
Rimi and Nanami finish watching a horror movie and discuss what makes popular titles stand out in a crowded genre, which is done by picturing their bandmates in scenarios emulating acclaimed films. In a Poppin'Party-led parody of Friday the 13th, Kasumi, Sāya, and Tae are camping when Kasumi and Tae decide to go stargazing. Tae is ambushed by Jason Voorhees, who is revealed to be Arisa before she gets hugged by Kasumi. Morfonica's sketch satirizes The Ring as Mashiro and Tōko notice Sadako Yamamura appearing from their television. The two panic before Rui shows up and turns off the television while Sadako is crossing through the screen, exposing her as Tsukushi and leaving her stuck in the device. Although Rimi and Nanami attempt to salvage the situation by imagining them being gradually attacked (which is merely Sāya bringing food to the two bands outside a campfire), they realize their bandmates are incapable of being proper horror characters.
16	"Happy Happy Vacation"; Transliteration: "Hapihapi ♪ Bakēshon" (Japanese: ハピハピ♪バケーション)	January 20, 2022
Hello, Happy World! visits the beach, where Misaki is dressed as Michelle (who in turn is wearing a swimsuit). Their day begins with a round of doubles beach volleyball with Michelle and Kokoro playing against Hagumi and Kanon, though Michelle wears herself out from repeatedly trying to return Hagumi's serves. Hoping to help her, Kanon proposes the others to make shaved ice while she convinces Misaki to take off Michelle. Misaki, Kokoro, and Hagumi search for seashells in the ocean, during which Kokoro ponders Michelle's presence. When Misaki tries to deflect by suggesting she is swimming, Kokoro notices the bear costume floating into the ocean, forcing Misaki to chase after it while an oblivious Kokoro, Hagumi, and Kaoru follow with the belief that they're going to swim.
17	"Chocolate Cornet Embezzlement"; Transliteration: "Korone Tsumamigui Saiban" (Japanese: コロネつまみ食い裁判)	January 27, 2022
In a trial parodying the Ace Attorney franchise, prosecutor Arisa indicts Mashiro for eating Rimi's chocolate cornet. Mashiro asserts her innocence and is backed by her attorney Kasumi, who continually objects to Arisa's evidence such as Mashiro declaring her love for the pastry (Mashiro claims she had only recently started enjoying them) and visiting Yamabuki Bakery but being told by Sāya they were out (she approached Sāya and Poppin'Party to ask about the band, though Kasumi had forgotten). Aya is called to the stand as a witness and recalls spotting Mashiro with chocolate around her mouth, which Mashiro defends as croquette sauce. When Kasumi continues to object, Aya reveals she spotted Kasumi eating a cornet, resulting in a quarrel between her and Arisa. Marina arrives in CiRCLE's basement where the trial was being held, and the others notice chocolate covering her mouth. Convinced, judge Rui proclaims her guilt.
18	"Kitty Kitty Time"; Transliteration: "Neko Neko Taimu" (Japanese: ねこねこタイム)	February 3, 2022
On her way to rehearsal, Yukina spots a cat that she briefly pets before leaving. The cat follows her before climbing a tree; when Yukina follows to bring it back down, the branch they are on snaps. At CiRCLE, Yukina is perplexed when her bandmates begin petting her until she realizes she has swapped bodies with the cat. She attempts to catch Lisa's attention by crawling inside her school blazer, though the others assume it is the cat being affectionate. Hina arrives with the cat in Yukina's body, which quickly latches on to Sayo. Lisa and Hina attempt to separate them, during which Yukina throws herself at her body and switches back. In her body again, Yukina nonchalantly begins practice before suddenly meowing, to everyone's confusion.
19	"Girls Band Party Masterpiece Theatre Taederella"; Transliteration: "Garupa Meisaku Gekijō ~Taederera~" (Japanese: ガルパ名作劇場～たえデレラ～)	February 10, 2022
In a puppetry parody of "Cinderella", Taederella is forced to clean by her family (Chiyu, Reona, and Masuki) while they attend a music festival where a prince is performing. Taederella wishes to attend and is greeted by a fairy godmother (Rokka) who gives her concert merchandise and a taxi voucher that she must return by midnight. At the show, the prince (Rei) searches among the crowd for someone to perform with and selects Taederella. After the two play together, Taederella is carried away by the fans before the prince could get her name, though she receives a glass guitar pick that she uses to track down Taederella and invites her to join her band. However, Tae breaks character and the fourth wall by refusing as she is already in Poppin'Party, causing Raise A Suilen to knock over the puppet stage in disbelief.
20	"Tomoe at the Arcade"; Transliteration: "Gēmusentā Tomoe" (Japanese: ゲームセンターともえ)	February 17, 2022
The Udagawa sisters are at an arcade where Tomoe decides to play a taiko game. She is suddenly challenged by Masuki to a two-person showdown, where they exert their drumming skills at exaggeratedly strong levels. Despite giving everything they had, the two end up tied in second place. To their surprise, the player at the top of the leaderboards turns out to be Maya.
21	"Happy Samba Carnival"; Transliteration: "Happī Sanbaka Nibal" (Japanese: ハッピーさんばかーニバル)	February 24, 2022
Hello, Happy World! is trying out a teleportation machine that Kokoro's Suits had built. They look inside the device to see how it works, but a curious Hagumi tries to push her way in and accidentally knocks the band into it, causing the machine to activate. The five swap bodies, causing them to panic until they hear the Suits approaching. Misaki, who is in Kokoro's body, quells the situation but is taken away by the Suits, unaware of their master's new host. While Misaki struggles to impersonate Kokoro amid her lavish lifestyle, Kokoro (in Misaki) leads the others through town where they spot Chisato. Kaoru (in Kanon) continues to act like herself, puzzling Chisato, before the four spot a samba parade. Misaki finds them participating in the parade, to Kanon (in Hagumi) and Chisato's horror and her disbelief.
22	"CiRCLE Kindergarten"; Transliteration: "Sākuru Yōchien" (Japanese: さーくる幼稚園)	March 3, 2022
Set in an alternate timeline, in which most of the girls are kindergartners, Marina runs a kindergarten at CiRCLE where she oversees the band girls. She watches the Hikawa twins play in the sandbox, but is shocked when they construct a sand guitar. Himari and Hagumi recite a nursery rhyme while playing rock paper scissors before the former pretends to play a bass riff. Chisato and Kaoru play house which becomes an unusually mature story about a struggling musician and her mother. When Sayo and Afterglow decide to play hopscotch, Marina is relieved at seeing a normal game before realizing the hopscotch outline resembles a music staff. She assembles the girls to rehearse for the school recital, but they sing dark lyrics about bands disagreeing with each other and the resulting fallout. Marina tries to manage the dilemma by asking for alternatives, though everyone suggests bizarre song ideas until she orders them to stop.
23	"Ook, Ook, Eek"; Transliteration: "Uhohouhohoi" (Japanese: ウホホウホホイ)	March 10, 2022
In a time of cavemen, Kasumi wakes up her friends before they begin hunting and gathering food, with Aya and Nanami staying behind. The hunters—Kasumi, Kokoro, and Hagumi—encounter a deer that they attempt to kill with their spears, but it inexplicably dodges each attack before escaping. The gatherers—Arisa, Rimi, and Tsukushi—collect fruit until they hear a rumble that forces them to run away, though they realize they are hiding underneath a mammoth. The trio are chased by the mammoth toward the hunters, who capitalize on the situation to kill it. The eight enjoy their feast before Kasumi tosses one of the mammoth's bones aside; hearing the sound it makes, she starts drumming with a pair of bones and encourages the others to join in.
24	"Thank You"; Transliteration: "Arigatō" (Japanese: ありがとう)	March 17, 2022
Yukina shows up to class wearing a face mask after losing her voice from practicing too much. Lisa initially urges her to go home, but she recognizes that Yukina wants to buy a new album at the music store. While shopping, Yukina encounters Chiyu and Reona, the former of whom mocks her for not taking care of herself before Lisa intervenes. At Hazawa Coffee, after a brief encounter with Eve, Lisa advises Yukina to order herbal tea instead of hot chocolate to treat her throat. As they head home, Yukina attempts to voice her gratitude, but Lisa acknowledges she knows what she is trying to say and accepts her thanks.
25	"Seven Band Joint Concert Meeting"; Transliteration: "7 Bando Gōdō Raibu Enshutsu Kaigi!" (Japanese: 7バンド合同ライブ演出会議！)	March 24, 2022
The bands notice Marina is absent from their meeting for the upcoming show. Maya and Rinko recall unusual behavior when they saw her in the past week that is initially interpreted by some as lovesickness, the former having spotted her wistfully staring out the window while the latter noticed her reading a magazine. Additional anecdotes imply Marina is departing CiRCLE as Rinko points out her magazine appeared to be a job listings book, while others remember her accidentally booking multiple bands for the same studio time slot, thanking an anonymous caller for their support, and cleaning up the counter with her personal belongings. Mashiro suggests she might be quitting while Ran theorizes the live house is closing, to the girls' distress.
26	"Beyond the Distant Sky"; Transliteration: "Harukanaru Sora no Saki e" (Japanese: 遥かなるソラの先へ)	March 31, 2022
As Marina continues to be absent from CiRCLE, the girls worry about the live house's future. Kasumi proposes organizing a concert of appreciation to send Marina off, which the bands enthusiastically approve. The girls' search for Marina ends when Kasumi spots her at a park, and she is taken back to CiRCLE where they perform. Although touched by their show, she is confused when the bands thank her for her support, and she explains her recent actions were simply helping a cafe staff member move. In disbelief, the girls let out a shout that forms into a large block of text, shooting CiRCLE into space. The live house thus becomes the first concert venue that doubles as a space station, and Poppin'Party hosts a show in astronaut gear.

== Production ==
The first season aired from July 5 to December 27, 2018, with episodes being aired live on the BanG Dream! TV variety show, Tokyo MX, SUN, and online on YouTube. Consisting of 26 three-minute episodes, the show aired from July to December.

A second season titled BanG Dream! Girls Band Party! Pico: Ohmori (Note: Japanese: BanG Dream! ガルパ☆ピコ～大盛り～, Hepburn: BanG Dorīmu! Garupa ☆ Piko ~Ōmori~; BanG Dream! GARUPA☆PICO ~Extra Large~) aired from May 7 to October 29, 2020. The episodes were live streamed on YouTube and Periscope for BanG Dream! TV. The 26-episode season ran from May to October.

BanG Dream! Girls Band Party! Pico Fever! (Note: Japanese: BanG Dream! ガルパ☆ピコ ふぃーばー！, Hepburn: BanG Dorīmu! Garupa ☆ Piko Fuiba!) aired from October 7, 2021, to March 31, 2022.

The show uses three pieces of theme music by the franchise's vocalists: "Pico! Papi! Girls Band Party! PICO!!!" (Note: Japanese: ピコっと！パピっと！！ガルパ☆ピコ！！！, Hepburn: Picotto! Papitto!! GARUPA☆PICO!!!) (Pico), "One Extra Large! Garupa Pico" (Note: Japanese: 大盛り一丁！ガルパ☆ピコ, Hepburn: Ohmori Icchō! Garupa☆Pico) (Ohmori), and "Picotarumono Fever!" (Note: Japanese: ピコたるもの、ふぃーばー！, Hepburn: Pikotaru Mono, Fuibā!) (Fever!). The first two themes were released as singles on August 22, 2018, and August 12, 2020, respectively; "Quintuple Smile" and "TWINKLE CiRCLE", both of which are theme songs for the game, were coupling tracks. "Pico! Papi! Girls Band Party! PICO!!!" peaked at tenth on the Oricon Weekly Singles Chart, while "One Extra Large! Garupa Pico" topped at 13th. Elements Garden's Ryota Suemasu and Asuka Oda were the composer and lyricist for the first theme, respectively, and Junpei Fujita took over composition for the second.

Seiya Miyajima serves as the director and animated character designer for both seasons, while Takaaki Kidani is the executive producer. Elements Garden oversees music production, with Noriyasu Agematsu and Fujita as producers. Sanzigen and Dmm.futureworks are assisted with animation by Passione and Creators in Pack. The voice actresses from the parent BanG Dream! anime reprise their roles for Pico.

== Other media ==
A manga based on the show, BanG Dream! Garupa Pico Comic Anthology, was released on March 14, 2019, by Bushiroad and Kadokawa Corporation. The anthology features comics from 17 artists, including Miyajima, who illustrated the cover and opening chapter.
