= Junya Enoki =

Japanese voice actor

- 榎木 淳弥
- Born: October 19, 1988 (age 38); Tokyo, Japan
- Occupation: Voice actor
- Years active: 2010–present
- Agent: Asleben
- Notable work: Jujutsu Kaisen as Yuji Itadori; Fly Me to the Moon as Nasa Yuzaki; JoJo's Bizarre Adventure: Golden Wind as Pannacotta Fugo; Marvel Cinematic Universe as Spider-Man; Digimon Adventure tri. as Takeru "T.K." Takaishi; Girlfriend, Girlfriend as Naoya Mukai; 2.5 Dimensional Seduction as Masamune Okumura
- Height: 168 cm (5 ft 6 in)
- Relatives: Chika Anzai (cousin)

Junya Enoki (榎木 淳弥, Enoki Jun'ya; born October 19, 1988) is a Japanese voice actor affiliated with Asleben.

== Biography ==
Enoki was born in Tokyo. He became interested in acting while in college. After watching Gurren Lagann, he became a voice actor. He was a member of the Atomic Monkey Voice Actor & Acting Laboratory's third graduating class. His cousin is Chika Anzai. He is the Japanese dubbing voice actor of Tom Holland, who is known for his role in the Marvel Cinematic Universe as Spider-Man. On July 1, 2025, he announced his departure from Atomic Monkey and joined Asleben.

== Filmography ==
=== Anime series ===
Year	Title	Role	Source
2012	Ixion Saga DT	Male	
2012	La storia della Arcana Famiglia	Claudio	
2012	Sword Art Online	Supporting Team, Lilpirin	
2013	Devils and Realist	Lower student B, Student A	
2014	Cardfight!! Vanguard G	Shion Kiba	
2014	Golden Time	Su-san	
2014	Haikyu!!	Suzuki	
2014	Noragami	Student D	
2014	Parasyte	Taku Furuya	
2014	Your Lie in April	Boy Participant	
2015	Absolute Duo	Student, Male, Divine Squad	
2015	Cardfight!! Vanguard G: GIRS Crisis	Shion Kiba	
2015	Beautiful Bones: Sakurako's Investigation	Shōtarō Tatewaki	
2015	Dance with Devils	Priest, Schoolboy, Vampire	
2015	My Love Story!!	Osamu Kurihara	
2015	Rin-ne	Road Rage	
2015	Saekano: How to Raise a Boring Girlfriend	Cafe customer	
2016	Beyblade Burst	Shu Kurenai	
2016	Cardfight!! Vanguard G: NEXT	Shion Kiba	
2016	Cardfight!! Vanguard G: Stride Gate	Shion Kiba	
2016	Cheer Boys!!	Attendant, Judo Member, Male Student, Shō's Friend	
2016	Girlish Number	Manyo-M	
2016	Hagane Orchestra	Kajika	
2016	Ozmafia!!	Hansel	
2016	Space Patrol Luluco	AΩ Nova	
2016	Tiger Mask W	Bull	
2016	Tonkatsu DJ Agetarō	Student	
2016	Touken Ranbu: Hanamaru	Horikawa Kunihiro	
2017	Akashic Records of Bastard Magic Instructor	Kash Winger	
2017	Altair: A Record of Battles	Giacomo Loredan	
2017	Beyblade Burst God	Shu Kurenai / Red Eye	
2017	Cardfight!! Vanguard G: Z	Shion Kiba	
2017	Children of the Whales	Sikon	
2017	Granblue Fantasy The Animation	Tomoi	
2017	Kakegurui – Compulsive Gambler	Male student	
2017	Katsugeki/Touken Ranbu	Horikawa Kunihiro	
2017	Love Kome: We Love Rice	Ann	
2017	Nana Maru San Batsu	Masaru Shibata	
2017	Scum's Wish	Saito	
2017	Sword Oratoria	Thane Hire	
2017	Tsuredure Children	Keisuke Tsuji	
2017	The Idolmaster SideM	Rui Maita	
2017	UQ Holder! Magister Negi Magi! 2	Tooru Mitsuhashi	
2017	Zoku Touken Ranbu: Hanamaru	Horikawa Kunihiro	
2018–present	Grand Blue	Shinichirō Yamamoto	
2018	Beyblade Burst Super Z	Shu Kurenai	
2018	Boruto: Naruto Next Generations	Tomaru	
2018	Gundam Build Divers	Divers	
2018	Hataraku Oniisan!	Jakonekawa-senpai, Male chicken	
2018	JoJo's Bizarre Adventure: Golden Wind	Pannacotta Fugo	
2018	Layton Mystery Tanteisha: Katori no Nazotoki File	Chris	
2018	Nil Admirari no Tenbin: Teito Genwaku Kitan	Taro Tsubameno	
2018	Ongaku Shōjo	Kenta Togenta	
2018	Radiant	Rookie Soldier Garvis	
2018	Record of Grancrest War	Flint	
2018	Run with the Wind	Tarō Jō	
2018	Souten no Ken Re:Genesis	Ramon Kasumi	
2018	SSSS.Gridman	Takato	
2018	Tada Never Falls in Love	Hajishou Taninaka	
2018	The Disastrous Life of Saiki K.	Student B	
2018	The Idolmaster SideM Wake Atte Mini!	Rui Maita	
2018	Tsukumogami Kashimasu	Seiji	
2019	Ace Attorney	Doug Swallow	
2019	Ahiru no Sora	Kento Sawa	
2019	Arifureta: From Commonplace to World's Strongest	Kousuke Endou	
2019	Beastars	Jack	
2019	Boogiepop Doesn't Laugh	Masami Saotome	
2019	Fairy Gone	Quateau	
2019	Inazuma Eleven: Orion no Kokuin	Reinaldo Baraja	
2019	Isekai Izakaya "Nobu"	Kazuyasu Takigawa	
2019	Kochoki	Takigawa Kazumasu	
2019	Kono Oto Tomare! Sounds of Life	Takezo Kurata	
2019	Outburst Dreamer Boys	Rei Tsukumo	
2019	Pazudora	Kageo Usui	
2019	Sarazanmai	Player A	
2019	Star Twinkle PreCure	Tatsunori Karube	
2019	The Price of Smiles	Lune Vanquish	
2019	True Cooking Master Boy	Lan Fei Hong	
2020	Arte	Angelo Parker	
2020	Attack on Titan: The Final Season	Reiner Braun (young)	
2020	Cardfight!! Vanguard Gaiden if	Shion Kiba	
2020	Darwin's Game	Inukai	
2020	Dorohedoro	Shin (young)	
2020	Drifting Dragons	Hero	
2020	Fly Me to the Moon	Nasa Yuzaki	
2020	Food Wars! Shokugeki no Soma: The Fifth Plate	Tommy Revolver	
2020	ID:Invaded	Kazuo Wakashika	
2020	Jujutsu Kaisen	Yuji Itadori	
2020	Shadowverse	Lucia Yonazuki	
2020	The 8th Son? Are You Kidding Me?	Wendelin von Benno Baumeister	
2020	The Millionaire Detective Balance: Unlimited	Ryо̄ Hoshino	
2020	Yashahime: Princess Half-Demon	Sōta Higurashi (adult)	
2021	2.43: Seiin High School Boys Volleyball Team	Yuni Kuroba	
2021	Cells at Work! Code Black	Red Blood Cell (Erythrocyte)	
2021	Demon Slayer: Kimetsu no Yaiba – Mugen Train Arc	Senjuro Rengoku	
2021	Girlfriend, Girlfriend	Naoya Mukai	
2021	Heaven's Design Team	Shimoda	
2021	I-Chu: Halfway Through the Idol	Li Chaoyang	
2021	Joran: The Princess of Snow and Blood	Unnamed	
2021	Koikimo	Kai Tamaru	
2021	Komi Can't Communicate	Shōsuke Komi	
2021	Project Scard: Scar on the Praeter	Kagami Sakishima	
2021	Scarlet Nexus	Yuito Sumeragi	
2021	Shadows House	Oliver	
2021	So I'm a Spider, So What?	Julius	
2021	SSSS.Dynazenon	Yomogi Asanaka	
2021	Tokyo Revengers	Seishu Inui	
2021	True Cooking Master Boy Season 2	Lan Fei Hong	
2021	Uchū Nanchara Kotetsu-kun	Niko	
2021	Yashahime: Princess Half-Demon Part II	Sōta Higurashi (adult)	
2022	Aoashi	Yūma Motoki	
2022	Detective Conan: The Culprit Hanzawa	Tsutomu Hanbayashi	
2022	Fanfare of Adolescence	Yukino Tayasu	
2022	Heroines Run the Show	Nagisa Shiranami	
2022	I've Somehow Gotten Stronger When I Improved My Farm-Related Skills	Al Wayne	
2022	Lucifer and the Biscuit Hammer	Yuuhi Amamiya	
2022	Mobile Suit Gundam: The Witch from Mercury	Martin Upmont	
2022	My Master Has No Tail	Mameda's father	
2022	Salaryman's Club	Mikoto Shiratori	
2022	Tokyo 24th Ward	Shuta Aoi	
2023	A Girl & Her Guard Dog	Mikio Tanuki	
2023	Ao no Orchestra	Sō Harada	
2023	By the Grace of the Gods 2nd Season	Dorche	
2023	Captain Tsubasa: Junior Youth Arc	Franz Schester	
2023	Firefighter Daigo: Rescuer in Orange	Daigo Toake	
2023	Flaglia	Ren	
2023	Fly Me to the Moon 2nd Season	Nasa Yuzaki	
2023	KamiKatsu	Yukito Urabe	
2023	Liar, Liar	Shinji Enomoto	
2023	Reborn as a Vending Machine, I Now Wander the Dungeon	Shiro	
2023	Ron Kamonohashi's Forbidden Deductions	Totomaru Isshiki	
2023	Sorcerous Stabber Orphen: Chaos in Urbanrama	Ryan	
2023	Technoroid Overmind	Silve	
2023	The Iceblade Sorcerer Shall Rule the World	Ray White	
2023	Jujutsu Kaisen Season 2	Yuji Itadori	
2023	The Most Heretical Last Boss Queen	Arthur	
2023	Ninjala	Ezet	
2024	2.5 Dimensional Seduction	Masamune Okumura	
2024	Black Butler: Public School Arc	Lawrence Bluewer	
2024	Bye Bye, Earth	Guinness	
2024	Dragon Ball Daima	Degesu	
2024	Fate/strange Fake	Faldeus Dioland	
2024	Our Last Crusade or the Rise of a New World Season II	Johaim Leo Armadel	
2024	Puniru Is a Cute Slime	Yūsuke Nanpa	
2024	Tonbo!	Bunpei	
2025	Aquarion: Myth of Emotions	Nanūk	
2025	Araiguma Calcal-dan	Acacal	
2025	New Panty & Stocking with Garterbelt	Polyester	
2025	Princession Orchestra	Besu	
2025	Wind Breaker Season 2	Shingo Natori	
2026	Yoroi-Shinden Samurai Troopers	Kaito Uesugi	
2026	The Invisible Man and His Soon-to-Be Wife	Kousuke Madaraito	
2026	High School! Kimengumi	Menichi Nikaidō	
2026	Hana-Kimi	Itsuki Kujō	
2026	Jujutsu Kaisen Season 3	Yuji Itadori	
2026	The Klutzy Class Monitor and the Girl with the Short Skirt	Tōgo Sakuradaimon	
2026	Black Torch	Reiji Kirihara	
2026	The Vermilion Mask	Zent	
2027	Giant Ojō-sama	Dr. Sebastian	

=== Original video animation ===
Year	Title	Role	Source
2010	D.C. I&II P.S.P. Re-Animated	Male student	
2012	Steins;Gate	Moderator	
2015-18	Digimon Adventure tri.	Takeru Takaishi	
2021	Fly Me to the Moon	Nasa Yuzaki	

=== Original net animation ===
Year	Title	Role	Source
2015	Comical Psychosomatic Medicine	male, male student, guru, office worker, bargaining	
2016	Whistle! (Voice remake version)	Wakana Yuto	
2018	Soka City 60th Anniversary Animation "Kimi-no Matsu Basho-e"	Souta Suzuki	
2020	Beyblade Burst Surge	Shu Kurenai	
2020	Kengan Ashura	Cosmo Imai	
2021	Beyblade Burst Dynamite Battle	Shu Kurenai	
2021	Ganbare Doukichan	Dōki-kun	
2021	High-Rise Invasion	Rika Honjō	
2021	Shabake	Ichitarō (Young man)	
2021	Star Wars: Visions - The Twins	Karre	
2022	Thermae Romae Novae	Markus Annius Verus	
2024	Garouden: The Way of the Lone Wolf	Tomoyuki Hikita	
2026	Fool Night	Akira Yatsuka	

=== Anime films ===
Year	Title	Role	Source
2015	The Anthem of the Heart	Gorō Saitō	
2017	Dance with Devils: Fortuna	Vampire	
2017	Touken Ranbu: Hanamaru ~Makuai Kaisōroku~	Horikawa Kunihiro	
2018	Hiragana Boys	Chi	
2018	Mobile Suit Gundam Narrative	Jona Basta	
2018	Yo-kai Watch: Forever Friends	Amaterasu	
2019	Is It Wrong to Try to Pick Up Girls in a Dungeon?: Arrow of the Orion	Thane Hire	
2020	Demon Slayer: Kimetsu no Yaiba the Movie: Mugen Train	Senjuro Rengoku	
2020	Digimon Adventure: Last Evolution Kizuna	Takeru Takaishi	
2021	My Hero Academia: World Heroes' Mission	Serpenters	
2021	The New Prince of Tennis: Hyotei vs. Rikkai Game of Future	Yoshio Tamagawa	
2022	Blue Thermal	Daisuke Sorachi	
2023	Gridman Universe	Yomogi Asanaka	
2023	Fate/strange Fake: Whispers of Dawn	Faldeus Dioland	
2023	Maboroshi	Masamune Kikuiri	
2023	Digimon Adventure 02: The Beginning	Takeru Takaishi	
2025	100 Meters	Numano	
TBA	Katsugeki/Touken Ranbu Movie	Horikawa Kunihiro	
TBA	Kukuriraige: Sanxingdui Fantasy	Masala	

=== Video games ===
2011

- Starry ☆ Sky ~ After Autumn ~, Satochin

2013

- Ozmafia!!, Hansel
- Majolica Familia, Knight Angel Satsuel, Devil Staff Aja
- Muv-Luv Alternative Chronicles 04

2014

- Hakuoki SSL: Sweet School Life

2015

- I-Chu, Li Chaoyang
- The Idolmaster SideM, Rui Maita
- OZMAFIA !! -vivace-, Hansel
- Granblue Fantasy, Tomoi
- Touken Ranbu, Horikawa Kunihiro
- Walpurgis no Uta [PS Vita], Usa
- 100 Sleeping Princes and the Kingdom of Dreams, Gerber

2016

- Ikemen Revolution:The Magic of Love with Alice, Luka Clemence
- Endride: X Fragments, Celeste
- Cardfight!! Vanguard G: Stride to Victory!!, Shion Kiba
- Cocktail Prince, Salty Dog
- Quiz RPG: The World of Mystic Wiz, Sact Ogami
- Summon Night 6: Lost Borders, Sol
- Nil Admirari no Tenbin: Teito Genwaku Kitan, Taro Tsubameno
- Beyblade Burst, Shu Kurenai
- Hagane Orchestra, Kajika
- Magical Days the Brats Parade, Ciel

2017

- Anidol Colors, Kanamori Rikuto
- Dear My Magical Boys, Arata Saiga
- Hiragana Boys, Chi
- Mitra Sphere
- The Idolmaster: SideM Live on St@ge!, Rui Maita

2018

- Collar x Malice -Unlimited-, Chisato Tachibana
- IDOL FANTASY, Mitsu Kumanoko
- Library Cross Infinite, Momo
- On-Air!, Kojo Arata
- Beyblade Burst Battle Zero, Shu Kurenai
- Starry Palette, Kazuyuki Igarashi
- Tsumugu Logic, Taki Tsumugu
- Super Robot Wars X-Ω, Jona Basta
- Yo-kai Watch: Puni Puni, Kenjin Amaterasu

2019

- Caste Heaven, Yoichiro Tatsumi
- DANKIRA!!! - Boys, be DANCING!, Miki Nozomu
- Kengan Ultimate Battle, Cosmo Imai
- Mobile Suit Gundam: Extreme Vs., Jona Basta
- Extraordinary Ones (Non Human Academy), Thundershingles
- Graffiti Smash, Chiado
- Pika-chin Kitto: Pochitto Puzzle, Aito Rom

2020

- Death end re;Quest 2, Arata Mizunashi
- Fire Emblem: Three Houses, Yuri
- WIND BOYS!, Kannoto Mikio
- Cupid Parasite, Keisaiin F. Ryuki
- Meiji Katsugeki Haikara Ryuuseigumi: Seibai Shimaseu, Hisashi Nango
- Shin Megami Tensei III: Nocturne HD Remaster, Demi-Fiend

2021

- Scarlet Nexus, Yuito Sumeragi
- Paradigm Paradox, Mihaya Araki
- Shin Megami Tensei V, Demi-Fiend

2022

- No More Heroes III, Damon Ricotello
- JoJo's Bizarre Adventure: All Star Battle R, Pannacotta Fugo
- Fitness Boxing: Fist of the North Star, Bat

2023

- Octopath Traveler II, Crick
- Xenoblade Chronicles 3: Future Redeemed, Matthew
- Honkai: Star Rail, Caelus
- Wizardry Variants Daphne, Picarelle

2024

- Jujutsu Kaisen: Cursed Clash, Yuji Itadori
- Pokémon Masters EX, Avery

2025

- Fatal Fury: City of the Wolves, Hokutomaru

2027

- Romancing SaGa 3: Destinies United, Julian Nohl

=== Live-action ===
Year	Title	Role	Type	Notes	Source
2021	Emergency Interrogation Room: Season 4	Robot (voice)	TV	Episode 5	
2021	Voice II	Police officer	TV	Episode 4	
2024	Acma:Game: The Final Key	Vajila	Movie		
2026	Super Space Sheriff Gavan Infinity	Biccringer (voice)	TV	Episode 16 and 21	

=== Dubbing ===
==== Film ====
- Tom Holland
  - Captain America: Civil War – Peter Parker / Spider-Man
  - Edge of Winter – Bradley Baker
  - Spider-Man: Homecoming – Peter Parker / Spider-Man
  - The Current War – Samuel Insull
  - Avengers: Infinity War – Peter Parker / Spider-Man
  - Avengers: Endgame – Peter Parker / Spider-Man
  - Spider-Man: Far From Home – Peter Parker / Spider-Man
  - The Devil All the Time – Arvin Russell
  - Cherry – Cherry
  - Spider-Man: No Way Home – Peter Parker / Spider-Man
  - Uncharted – Nathan Drake
  - Spider-Man: Brand New Day – Peter Parker / Spider-Man
  - The Odyssey – Telemachus
- Alita: Battle Angel – Tanji (Jorge Lendeborg Jr.)
- Another Round – Jonas (Magnus Sjørup)
- Babygirl – Samuel (Harris Dickinson)
- Black Adam – Albert Rothstein / Atom Smasher (Noah Centineo)
- Cloudy Mountain – Hong Yizhou (Zhu Yilong)
- Escape Room – Danny Khan (Nik Dodani)
- The Hate U Give – Chris Bryant (KJ Apa)
- It – Victor "Vic" Criss (Logan Thompson)
- Mad Max: Fury Road (2019 THE CINEMA edition) – Nux (Nicholas Hoult)
- Tomb Raider – Nitin (Antonio Aakeel)

==== Drama ====
- Blindspot – Vanya Petrushev (Alex Ozerov)
- A Discovery of Witches – Marcus Whitmore (Edward Bluemel)
- Outlander – Ian Murray (John Bell)
- Squid Game – Hwang Jun-ho (Wi Ha-joon)
- The Staircase – Clayton Peterson (Dane DeHaan)
- The Thundermans – Oyster (Tanner Stine)

==== Animation ====
- Marvel Zombies – Peter Parker / Spider-Man
- What If...? – Peter Parker / Spider-Man

==== Documentary ====
- Joshua: Teenager vs. Superpower – Joshua Wong

==== Other ====
- The Chef Show - Tom Holland
