= Cardfight!! Vanguard G: Stride Gate =

- Official Poster for Cardfight!! Vanguard G: Stride Gate
- No. of episodes: 24

Release
- Original network: TV Tokyo
- Original release: April 17 – September 25, 2016

Series chronology
- ← Previous; GIRS Crisis Next → NEXT

Cardfight!! Vanguard G: Stride Gate is the third season of Cardfight!! Vanguard G and the seventh season overall in the Cardfight!! Vanguard series as the third of The TRY 3 Saga. It aired in Japan from April 17, 2016, to September 25, 2016, running 24 episodes.

== Plot ==
Kouji Ibuki's Plan G is in effect, and they've located Ryuzu Myoujin's headquarters. It's up to Team TRY3 and their friends to stop Ryuzu's ambitions! However, Ryuzu has a defense force called the "Company", whose members include Shouma Shinonome and Am Chouno!

Ryuzu dies but is reborn into the body of a child, who plans to take hold of the remaining 4 Zodiac Time Beasts from Chrono to open the stride gate, to lead the world into the perfect future. To stop this, Team TRY 3, Taiyou Asukawa, and Am must defeat all of the members of "Company". The final judgment has been cast. And the future of Earth and Planet Cray are both at stake.

== Main characters ==
- Chrono Shindou – Gear Chronicle user, with Chronojet Dragon as the main theme
- Tokoha Anjou – Neo Nectar user, with Asha as the main theme
- Shion Kiba – Royal Paladin user, with Altmile as the main theme
- Kamui Katsuragi – Nova Grappler user, with Victor as the main theme
- Taiyou Asukawa – Gold Paladin user, with Gurguit as the main theme
- Luna Yumizuki – Pale Moon user, with Harri as the main theme
- Am Chouno – Granblue user, with Nightrose as the main theme
- Kouji Ibuki – Link Joker user, with Messiah as the main theme

== Antagonists ==
- Ryuzu Myoujin – Gear Chronicle user, using various Time Beasts and Chronofang
- Shouma Shinonome – Genesis user, with Fenrir as the main theme
- Hiroki Moriyama – Dimension Police user, with Cosmic Hero as the main theme
- Sousuke Wakamizu – Megacolony user, with Darkface as the main theme
- Kensuke Handa – Granblue user, with Seven Seas as the main theme
- Satoru Enishi – Dark Irregulars user, with Scharhrot as the main theme

== Theme songs ==
Opening theme

- "SHOUT!" by Mamoru Miyano (eps. 271–294)
- "Break It" by Mamoru Miyano – English dub version (eps. 271–294)

Ending theme

- "High Touch☆Memory" by Yui Ogura (eps. 271–282)
- "Promise You!!" by YuiKaori (eps. 283–294)

== Episode list ==
No. overall	No. in series	Title	Directed by	Written by	Original release date
271	75	"Storm Ryuzu's Lab!"; Transliteration: "Totsunyū! Ryūzu Rabo" (Japanese: 突入！リューズ・ラボ)	Kenichi Maejima	Kazuhiko Inukai	April 17, 2016
Kouji leads an elite team, including TRY3, on a mission to infiltrate Ryuzu's lab to retrieve both his Depend Cards and the units that he had summoned from Cray. There, the group is separated due to the efforts of Ryuzu's security robots led by Hiroki Moriyama, a member of the "Company". Chrono and Kouji are furthered separated from Kamui, Tokoha, and Shion; those three wind up in battles against the other Company members, which consists of the enigmatic Sousuke Wakamizu, the Dark Zone branch chief Satoru Enishi, and Shouma. Meanwhile, Chrono and Kouji come face-to-face with Ryuzu. He reveals his ambition to gather specific units called the Zodiac Time Beasts to open the Stride Gate, which he believes will perfect the world. Ultimately, the Company successfully stalls for enough time to transport the Time Beasts to another location and escape. However, due to the accumulative side effects from summoning the Time Beasts, Ryuzu dies but not before giving his last words: "For though a righteous man falls seven times, he rises again."
272	76	"Ryuzu Myoujin"; Transliteration: "Myōjin Ryūzu" (Japanese: 明神リューズ)	Masahiko Matsunaga	Kazuhiko Inukai	April 24, 2016
Some time has passed after Ryuzu's death. While on his way to meet with Taiyou, Chrono meets a peculiar boy who has a Gear Chronicle deck and decides to have a cardfight with him. Much to Chrono's shock, the boy reveals himself as Ryuzu Myoujin reincarnated. As the fight goes on, Ryuzu expresses more of his ideals of making the world perfect through Vanguard. After Ryuzu defeats Chrono, he tells him that his father Rive Shindou is alive and that Kouji knew it all along. Before leaving the distraught Chrono, Ryuzu suggests he should join with him.
273	77	"Hiroki Moriyama"; Transliteration: "Moriyama Hiroki" (Japanese: 守山ヒロキ)	Eiichi Kuboyama	Daisuke Ishibashi	May 1, 2016
Chrono meets with Kouji to ascertain that Rive is still alive. Kouji also explains his reasons for keeping this information secret. Meanwhile, the United Sanctuary Branch is invaded by the Company's Hiroki Moriyama, a young boy who believes he is a hero of justice while all who oppose him are evil. Since Team AL4 is currently out, Taiyou takes it upon himself to defend the branch by cardfighting Hiroki. As the battle continues, Hiroki spouts more of his ideals of how justice always wins, evil always loses, and evil must be punished. This reminds Taiyou of the old elitist philosophy of the branch and gives him more reason to defeat Hiroki. Unfortunately, not only does Taiyou lose, but Am (as Ace) summons one of the Zodiac Time Beasts and uses its power to destroy the branch. While there were no casualties, Taiyou is nonetheless disheartened that he could not defend the branch.
274	78	"Reunion with Kanzaki"; Transliteration: "Kanzaki to no Saikai" (Japanese: 神崎との再会)	Yūsuke Onoda	Miya Asakawa	May 8, 2016
Chrono and Taiyou seek Kanzaki, who is training in a secluded mountain range. They tell him about the situation with Ryuzu, and in exchange, Kanzaki tells them more about Depend Cards; they are contracts between a fighter and a summoned unit from Cray, but summoning units require a large amount of Stride Force. Kanzaki also reminds Chrono of their fight when Chrono had truly summoned Chronojet Dragon, which surprises Chrono of his own untapped power. Meanwhile, Shouma approaches Ibuki and warns him of certain punishment. After spending the night at Kanzaki's hut, Chrono and Taiyou return to the city and confront Hiroki, following Kanzaki's hunches. Having rebuilt his deck, Taiyou challenges Hiroki to a rematch.
275	79	"Taiyou vs. Hiroki"; Transliteration: "Taiyō tai Hiroki" (Japanese: タイヨウVSヒロキ)	Fumihiro Ueno	Ayumu Hisao	May 15, 2016
Taiyou starts his rematch against Hiroki. Realizing how lonely Hiroki truly is and how he clings to his twisted sense of justice, Taiyou defeats Hiroki, who escapes with help from Wakamizu. Meanwhile, Am tells both Tokoha and Luna her reason for working with Ryuzu: to revive her comatose parents. She also tells them her role as Peacemaker, the one who will eventually open the Stride Gate. Although Am cuts off her ties of friendship with the two, Luna nonetheless wishes to stay by her side. Later that day, Chrono learns that Mikuru also knew that Rive was still alive but kept that secret from him. Appalled, he storms out of his home, and standing next to him is Ryuzu...
276	80	"Collapse of the Dragon Empire Branch"; Transliteration: "Doragon Empaia Shibu Hōkai" (Japanese: ドラゴンエンパイア支部崩壊)	Junichirō Hashiguchi	Kiyoko Yoshimura	May 22, 2016
After having an odd dream about Rive, Chrono and Ryuzu talk more about the latter's goal to perfect the world into one without strife or war. Chrono says Ryuzu's methods to do so are contradictory, but he replies that sacrifices are necessary. Ryuzu also tells Chrono that he is the singularity, as in the first person to create a link between Earth and Cray, which causes sudden images to appear in Chrono's head. Meanwhile, Enishi, Am/Ace, and Luna appear at the Dragon Empire Branch. To defend the branch, Mamoru cardfights and defeats Enishi. Then, when Am fights Kouji, Luna shockingly summons one of the Zodiac Time Beasts, Chronobeat Buffalo, and has it attack and destroy the branch. In the midst of the attack, Mamoru protects Tokoha but gets injured in the process. Before the Buffalo's rampage could continue, Enishi knocks Luna unconscious, which causes the beast to disappear. With the destruction of the branch, Enishi, Am, and Luna retreat.
277	81	"An Ill-Tempered Visitor"; Transliteration: "Fukigen na Mimaikyaku" (Japanese: 不機嫌な見舞客)	Ryōsuke Senbo	Kazuhiko Inukai	May 29, 2016
The attack on the Dragon Empire Branch left many people hospitalized, including Mamoru and Kouji. Tokoha blames herself by thinking if she had stopped Am and Luna, then this incident would not have happened. Tokoha is then approached by Rin Hashima, who challenges her to a cardfight. Tokoha is too sad to fully focus on the battle, but when Rin defeats her, she snaps out of her depression and is glad to see that all of the patients are recovering. Later, Chrono confronts Ryuzu again and challenges him...
278	82	"Chrono's Memory"; Transliteration: "Kurono no Kioku" (Japanese: クロノの記憶)	Eiichi Kuboyama	Kiyoko Yoshimura	June 5, 2016
Transported to a secluded ruined area, Chrono cardfights Ryuzu. While battling, bits of Chrono's lost memories regarding his father slowly pop into his mind until he finally recalls the incident involving himself, Rive, and Ryuzu. As it turns out, Rive and Ryuzu were friends who were working on creating a link between Earth and the planet Cray. One day, Chrono was brought over to a laboratory and watched an experiment in which Rive was used to open a portal to Cray. However, Rive later learned how Ryuzu wanted to sacrifice Cray for Earth's benefit. While Rive argued with him, Chrono heard a voice calling him from the Cray side of the portal. That voice belonged to Chrono Dran, and Chrono had summoned the dragon to Earth. When Ryuzu wanted to capture Chrono Dran, Rive knew at that moment what he had to do. He overloaded the system, caused the portal to explode, and destroyed the lab while protecting Chrono and Chrono Dran. While carrying the two away, Rive told Chrono to forget everything. Back in the present time, with all of his memories retained, Chrono is more appalled with Ryuzu, who knocks him unconscious with a taser.
279	83	"Awakening of the Depend Card"; Transliteration: "Dipendo Kādo Kakusei" (Japanese: ディペンドカード覚醒)	Masahiko Matsunaga	Kiyoko Yoshimura	June 12, 2016
Chrono discovers that he has been taken to a private villa where he and Ryuzu continue from where their cardfight left off. Meanwhile, Kouji, Kamui, Shion, and Tokoha track down Chrono's location but are impeded by the Company. During the scuffle, Enishi tells Tokoha that Luna has become the new Peacemaker and has lost her sense of self as a result. Back at the villa, Ryuzu comes to realize that no matter what he says, Chrono will not join his cause. Just as Ryuzu lands the potential finishing blow, he summons his Chronofang Tiger to the real world and attacks Chrono with it. But it is at that moment when Chrono's 3 remaining Depend Cards awaken and are summoned to aid him. Chrono also summons Chrono Dran, and his four units fend off Tiger and knock out Ryuzu. This causes him to drop his other Depend Cards, which Chrono takes and tries to awaken all of them. However, doing so not only drains Chrono's energy and make him faint, but also unbeknownst to him, it worked in Ryuzu's favor. Later, after having an ominous dream about the Zodiac Time Beasts trapped with Luna, Chrono wakes up and finds himself back home safe with his friends and family.
280	84	"Triangle of Divas"; Transliteration: "Utahime no Torianguru" (Japanese: 歌姫の三重奏(トライアングル))	Yūsuke Onoda	Daisuke Ishibashi	June 19, 2016
To help with the reconstruction of the Dragon Empire Branch, Saya Yatomi returns to hold a special event, the "Happy Vanguard Festival", along with fellow idols Lisa Ferris and Remy Altena. Drawing many attendees, the festival moves on to the main event: a stage performance in which Saya, Lisa, and Remy try to show the evil "Black Vangua-rou" the fun of Vanguard. However, during the show, rain falls and causes one of the stage props to malfunction. Just when Saya thinks the show is ruined, Team TRY3 appears as Card Warriors Vanguamen. Thanks to them getting the audience involved, the show is saved, and the festival is an overall success.
281	85	"The Trio, Once More"; Transliteration: "Sannin de, Futatabi" (Japanese: 三人で、再び)	Nobuyoshi Nagayama	Daisuke Ishibashi	June 26, 2016
Jaime takes TRY3, Kamui, Misaki, and Taiyou to a deserted island reserved for training. After said training, Jaime devises a plan to give TRY3 some alone time; he has the team search for the lunch preparations which were "accidentally misplaced" in the mountains. As they hike the mountain, the three let out their feelings about everything, thus increasing their bond. After TRY3 returns with the food, they train more and discuss their plans for the future.
282	86	"Rive and Ryuzu"; Transliteration: "Raibu to Ryūzu" (Japanese: ライブとリューズ)	Toshio Kiuchi	Kazuhiko Inukai	July 3, 2016
Shin tells Chrono about his past with Rive. Back then, Shin was part of Team Nippon along with Mark Whiting and Rive, who was also the team's mentor. Together, they won the national Vanguard tournament and were invited to the world championship. Around the same time, Rive was also spending time with Ryuzu, which Shin did not like because it was taking time away from training. One day, Shin met Ryuzu and had a cardfight with him; if Shin won, then Ryuzu would not be allowed to see Rive. Although Shin won, Rive still kept meeting with Ryuzu. Eventually, Shin realized the likely reason why Rive kept seeing Ryuzu: they both agreed on and pursued the idea that Vanguard can be used to make the world a better place. Rive tells Shin about the existence of the Gear Chronicle clan and said that it was the key to change the world, which was the last memory Shin had of him.
283	87	"Promise"; Transliteration: "Yakusoku" (Japanese: 約束)	Kiyomitsu Satō	Kiyoko Yoshimura	July 10, 2016
Kouji learns from Kai that the Zodiac Time Beasts are somewhere in outer space and relays this info to Chrono and his friends. Later, Chrono decides to cardfight Kouji to test his modified deck which no longer has Chronojet Dragon in it. During the battle, Kouji apologizes to Chrono for withholding information about Rive's condition. He also tells Chrono the reason he treated him so harshly in the past was to toughen him for the battle against Ryuzu. After the fight, Chrono tells Kouji that he is prepared to let Kouji use his power however he wants, even if it may cost Chrono his life.
284	88	"Trinity Dragon's Fierce Battle"; Transliteration: "Gekitou! Toriniti Doragon" (Japanese: 激闘！トリニティドラゴン)	Ryōsuke Senbo	Miya Asakawa; Kazuhiko Inukai	July 17, 2016
Team Trinity Dragon stumbles upon a secret facility run by Wakamizu, and they challenge him. If any members of Trinity Dragon beat Wakamizu, then he will tell them his scheme. However, if Wakamizu defeats all of Trinity Dragon, then they will become guinea pigs for his experiments. Both Karl and Tsuneto lose, but Kei gathers information from their fights to finally defeat Wakamizu. As promised, he tells them that he has been using this facility to gather Stride Force to summon the last Zodiac Time Beast and open the Stride Gate. Wakamizu escapes by activating the facility's self-destruct mechanism. Team Trinity Dragon also escapes before the facility is destroyed, and the group tells Kamui what they have learned. After praising them, Kamui informs them about everything that has happened.
285	89	"Enishi vs. Am"; Transliteration: "Enishi VS Amu" (Japanese: 江西VSアム)	Yūsuke Onoda	Kazuhiko Inukai	July 24, 2016
To prevent Luna from being sacrificed for the Company's project, Am cardfights Enishi. She resolves herself to save Luna even if it means losing the chance to revive her parents. On the other hand, Enishi reveals his past in which he and a female friend suffered from a disease. He swore to protect her, but the girl eventually died while Enishi lived, which makes him think her life was given to save his. Believing that Luna's sacrifice is necessary for the sake of a better future, Enishi defeats Am and banishes her from the Company.
286	90	"Shinonome's Joy"; Transliteration: "Shinonome no Yuetsu" (Japanese: 東雲の愉悦)	Yukio Kuroda	Kazuhiko Inukai	July 31, 2016
With things going smoothly for the Company, Wakamizu proceeds to summon the last Zodiac Time Beast. However, Shouma wants to make his own "adjustment" to the process and cardfights Wakamizu to do so. Meanwhile, Am requests Team TRY3 to help her save Luna, but Shion refuses to forgive Am for her actions and walks away. On the other hand, Tokoha tells Am that she still considers her as a friend and accepts her request. Back at the Company's headquarters, in spite of Wakamizu's calculations, Shouma defeats him. After having Wakamizu forcibly removed, Shouma makes a slight adjustment to the summoning process.
287	91	"Perfect Future"; Transliteration: "Kanzen'naru Mirai" (Japanese: 完全なる未来)	Junichirō Hashiguchi	Kiyoko Yoshimura	August 7, 2016
After Shion agrees to help Am save Luna, Chrono and the gang are called out by Ryuzu. He pulls Chrono into an image that details how he was able to summon the Zodiac Time Beasts after Rive's betrayal. Then, with the power of all the Zodiac Time Beasts in possession, Ryuzu opens the Stride Gate, creating a Tower of Light. Sacrificing the Planet Cray and converting it into energy through the gate, Ryuzu's image of a "perfect future" is born; everyone falls into a deep slumber and will dream blissfully about their own perfect futures forever. But Chrono, Shion, Tokoha, Am, and Taiyou awake from their dreams because they have been chosen as arbiters who will fight Ryuzu and the Company. The outcome of their battles will decide the future once and for all.
288	92	"Time of Judgment"; Transliteration: "Shinpan no Toki" (Japanese: 審判の刻)	Nobuyoshi Nagayama	Kiyoko Yoshimura	August 14, 2016
Because of the "adjustment" that Shouma made to the summoning process, Kouji is unaffected by Ryuzu's image and goes into the Tower of Light to face Ryuzu. Chrono and the gang soon enter the tower, become separated, and each prepare to fight against the members of the Company (except Chrono). For the last time, Taiyou battles Hiroki, defeats him, and offers to be his friend despite everything that happened.
289	93	"Deus Ex Machina"; Transliteration: "Kikaijikake no Kami" (Japanese: 機械仕掛けの神)	Masahiro Sonoda	Ayumu Hisao	August 21, 2016
Kouji fights Ryuzu, who slowly binds each of the twelve Zodiac Time Beast cards. In doing so, he is able to stride Deus Ex Machina, Demiurge, use its effect to stack his deck with triggers, and defeat Kouji. Then, Kouji activates a device that causes Chrono Dran to be awakened. In response, Ryuzu summons Chronofang Tiger to stop Kouji. Although Kouji is knocked out by the Tiger, he successfully frees Chrono Dran, which returns to Chrono's possession.
290	94	"Blazing Sword"; Transliteration: "Kōki no Ken" (Japanese: 光輝の剣)	Ryōsuke Senbo	Kazuhiko Inukai	August 28, 2016
After retrieving the Kiba family sword, Shion cardfights Shouma. He boasts how he has foreseen everything that has happened and enjoys when both his own predictions come true and unforeseen events occur. On the other hand, Shion retorts how Shouma is just a manipulative observer while he gain what he wants through his own efforts. At that moment, the Kiba sword transforms into a new G-unit for Shion: Blazing Sword, Fides. He uses its power to defeat Shouma, who predicted that this would happen. Just then, a large piece of debris is about to fall on Shouma, but Shion pushes him out of the way and is crushed. Shouma thinks that Shion is pretending to be unconscious but slowly realizes that he may be dead. He cries for Shion to wake up just as more debris falls on both of them.
291	95	"True Feelings"; Transliteration: "Hontō no Kimochi" (Japanese: 本当の気持ち)	Yūsuke Onoda	Kazuhiko Inukai	September 4, 2016
Tokoha fights Enishi, who believes that Ryuzu's "perfect future" is the right one in which no one will be hurt. However, Tokoha tries to convince him that this future is a false one that only blinds people. She goes on by saying there may be tough times, but people can and will get through them. Defeating Enishi, Tokoha gets him to admit that even he thought Ryuzu's vision of a perfect future was wrong. Meanwhile, Am fights a projection of Luna's will, which is to make Am's wish of reviving her parents come true. Am confesses that what she truly wants is to be with Luna, even if it means having to wait longer for her parents to wake up from their comas. After Am beats the projection, the real Luna awakens.
292	96	"Chrono vs. Ryuzu"; Transliteration: "Kurono VS Ryūzu" (Japanese: クロノVSリューズ)	Toshio Kiuchi	Kiyoko Yoshimura	September 11, 2016
While on his way to face Ryuzu, Chrono comes across Kouji, who is injured from his battle with Ryuzu. After confirming that Chrono Dran returned to Chrono, Kouji urges him to go on. Chrono does so and begins his cardfight against Ryuzu. In this fight, Chrono and Ryuzu both feel all damage inflicted, thus risking their lives in this final showdown.
293	97	"Future Beyond Imagination"; Transliteration: "Imēji o Koeta Mirai" (Japanese: イメージを超えた未来)	Masahiko Matsunaga	Kiyoko Yoshimura	September 18, 2016
Ryuzu strides Demiurge and uses its effect to stack his deck with triggers like he did against Kouji. However, Chrono counters by forcing Ryuzu to shuffle his deck before attacking. Believing that the power of bonds will help him overcome anything that the future may hold, Chrono strides a new G unit, Chronodragon Gear Groovy, which was created thanks to the collective Stride Force of awoken fighters from around the world. With its power, Chrono defeats Ryuzu.
294	98	"NEXT STAGE"	Nobuyoshi Nagayama	Kiyoko Yoshimura	September 25, 2016
With Ryuzu's defeat, the Stride Gate not only begins to crumble, but the energy that was poured through it is pushed back to the Planet Cray. Ryuzu accepts his loss and prepares himself to disappear along with the gate. Chrono wishes to save him, and in response, the Zodiac Time Beasts revert Ryuzu into an infant to give him a second chance in life. The Zodiac Time Beasts return to Cray, the Stride Gate is destroyed, and Chrono and his friends are sent back to Earth. Two months later, life has returned to normal, including how Shion becomes the official heir to the Kiba family, which has been restored to its former glory. Everyone, including former enemies, convenes to a Vanguard tournament hosted by Chrono, and they all have fun playing the game that they have formed bonds over.
