= Cardfight!! Vanguard G: NEXT =

- No. of episodes: 52

Release
- Original network: TV Tokyo
- Original release: October 2, 2016 – October 1, 2017

Series chronology
- ← Previous; Stride Gate Next → Z

Cardfight!! Vanguard G: NEXT is the fourth season of Cardfight!! Vanguard G and the eighth season overall in the Cardfight!! Vanguard series and the fourth of The TRY 3 Saga. It began airing in Japan on October 2, 2016, and finished airing in Japan on October 1, 2017.

== Plot ==
The story takes place five months after Stride Gate, in which Chrono, Shion, and Tokoha have gone their separate ways by enrolling in different high schools. Chrono enrolled to Tokyo Metropolitan Harumi High School, Shion enrolled in Fukuhara high and Tokoha went to France for her studies. They later form their own teams to enter the Vanguard U20 Championship. Chrono forms a new team with Taiyou Asukawa and Kazuma Shouji, a gloomy boy who studies in the same high school as Chrono. Shion made a team with Henry Hayao (The captain of Fukuhara High Vanguard club) and Rin Hashima. Tokoha with Satoru Enishi and Kumi Okazaki. However the current U20 Champion and his team are under the control of units from Cray, who plan to use the U20 as a way to destroy the connection of Earth and Cray. The new teams of Chrono, Shion, and Tokoha must work together while competing against each other or risk losing Vanguard forever.

== Main characters ==
The main characters of the season are:

- Chrono Shindou – Uses a Gear Chronicle deck with Chronojet Dragon as the main theme
- Shion Kiba – Uses a Royal Paladin deck with Altmile as the main theme
- Tokoha Anjou – Uses a Neo Nectar deck with Asha as the main theme
- Taiyou Asukawa – Uses a Gold Paladin deck with Gurguit as the main theme
- Satoru Enishi – Uses a Dark Irregulars deck with Scharhrot as the main theme
- Rin Hashima – Uses an Angel Feather deck with Gavrail as the main theme
- Kumi Okazaki – Uses an Oracle Think Tank deck with Battle Sisters as the main theme
- Kazuma Shouji – Uses a Shadow Paladin deck with Luard as the main theme
- Henri Hayao – Uses a Narukami deck with Vanquisher as the main theme

== Antagonists ==
The antagonists of the season are:

- Kazumi Onimaru (Diffriden by Stealth Dragon, Shiranui) – Uses a Nubatama deck
- Saori Fuchidaka (Diffriden by Flare Trooper, Dumjid) – Uses a Kagero deck
- Verno Fahrenheart (Diffriden by Prime Beauty, Amaruda) – Uses a Genesis deck
- Noa Hoshizaki (Diffriden by Star Vader, Chaos Breaker) – Uses a Link Joker deck

== Theme songs ==
Opening theme

- "Hello, Mr. Wonderland" by Ayako Nakanomori (eps. 295–319)
- "→Next Generation" by Psychic Lover (eps. 320–346)

Ending theme

- "Wing of Image" by Rummy Labyrinth (Haruka Kudō and Aimi Terakawa) (eps. 295–307 in Japanese; 295-present in English dub)
- "Are you ready to FIGHT" by Raychell (eps. 308–319)
- "Pleasure Stride" by Milky Holmes (eps. 320–332)
- "Natsuninare" by Starmarie (eps. 333–346)

== Episode list ==
No. overall	No. in series	Title	Directed by	Written by	Original release date
295 (99)	1	"Welcome to the NEXT STAGE!!"	Kō Nakagawa	Kazuhiko Inukai	October 2, 2016
Time has passed, and the members of Team TRY3 have gone their separate ways as they enter high school. Tokoha is studying abroad in France, Shion is attending Fukuhara High, and Chrono enrolls in Tokyo Metropolitan Harumi High School. However, Chrono has a hard time adjusting to his new school life. Later, while working at Card Capital 2, Chrono is challenged to a cardfight by a peculiar young man, who soundly defeats him with his Nubatama deck. Before leaving, the man reveals his name to Chrono: Kazumi Onimaru. Upon learning that Onimaru is the reigning "Under 20" Vanguard champion, Chrono decides to enter the U20 Championship.
296 (100)	2	"Dragon Awaiting Awakening"; Transliteration: "Kakusei wo Motsu Ryū" (Japanese: 覚醒を待つ竜)	Yūsuke Suzuki	Ayumu Hisao	October 9, 2016
To enter the U20 Championship, Chrono must find two other fighters and form a team with them. He recruits Taiyou but has yet to find a third member. Later at the card shop, Chrono meets an apathetic teenager named Kazuma Shouji, who also attends Harumi High School. He claims to have previously played Vanguard and requests Chrono to re-teach the game's rules to him. So, Chrono has a teaching fight with Kazuma, who is slowly reminded of how Vanguard is played. Despite acting passive to most of Chrono's teachings, Kazuma becomes motivated when he gets the chance to stride. However, when Chrono tries to win on the following turn, Kazuma decides to quit, believing he already lost. Chrono tries to tell him to never give up until the very end and to believe in his own possibilities. He shows Kazuma that he would have gotten a heal trigger to help him stay in the game, but he suddenly gets defensive upon Chrono touching his card. He then leaves, and Chrono wonders why Kazuma acted the way he did.
297 (101)	3	"Kazuma's Ritual"; Transliteration: "Kazuma no Richuaru" (Japanese: カズマの儀式(リチュアル))	Yūki Arie	Hiroshi Yamaguchi	October 16, 2016
Learning from Chrono about Kazuma, Taiyou goes to confront Kazuma to see what kind of person he is. Despite a run-in with Kazuma's delinquent friends, Taiyou gets his chance to cardfight Kazuma. When Taiyou gains the upper hand, Kazuma almost decides to give up, which makes Chrono deduce that he has a fear of losing. However, Kazuma continues the fight and wins, much to his own surprise. Afterwards, Chrono and Taiyou decide to recruit Kazuma onto their team for the U20 Championship (despite Kazuma's protests).
298 (102)	4	"The "Ki" Prince of Fukuhara"; Transliteration: "Fukuhara no "Ki" Kōshi" (Japanese: 福原の「綺」公子)	Kazuhide Kondō	Kenji Konuta	October 23, 2016
At Fukuhara High, Shion learns that the school's once-prestigious Vanguard club is past its prime and now in danger of being disbanded. Along with the club's sole remaining member, Henri Hayao, he makes a proposition to the school's board of directors; if the Vanguard club can win the U20 Championship, then the club will stay. Later, Shion and Henri have a cardfight, in which the latter plays nervously. Noticing this, Shion helps him get over his nerves, and the two have a wholehearted battle. After the fight, Henri remembers that they need a third member to enter the U20, and Shion knows just the person to recruit.
299 (103)	5	"Smile of Queen and Schemes"; Transliteration: "Joō to Sakubō no Hohoemi" (Japanese: 女王と策謀の微笑み)	Yūsuke Onoda	Atsuo Ishino	October 30, 2016
The one who Shion hopes to recruit to Fukuhara's Vanguard club is Rin Hashima, but doing so is not an easy task. Henri requests for Rin to join, which she initially refuses, but he manages to catch her interest when he mentions that Mamoru Anjou will come teach the club. Later that afternoon, Rin comes to the club room before Mamoru does, and Shion coaxes her into playing against Henri. While the two have their cardfight, Mamoru appears, and Shion tricks him into believing that Rin is a member of the club and she is training with Henri. Because of her not wanting to lose face in front of Mamoru, Rin reluctantly becomes an official club member.
300 (104)	6	"Crossover"; Transliteration: "Kurosuōbā" (Japanese: クロスオーバー)	Hiroshi Kimura	Ayumu Hisao	November 6, 2016
Chrono's and Shion's teams meet and have a friendly team fight with each other.
301 (105)	7	"My Future In Bloom"; Transliteration: "Kaika-suru Watashi no Mirai" (Japanese: 開花する私の未来)	Atsushi Nakayama	Kazuhiko Inukai	November 13, 2016
A month has passed since Tokoha began studying abroad in France, where she is also assisting with the Vanguard Association's Paris Branch. One day, she is introduced by Jaime to a young man named Miguel Torres, a polite albeit misfortunate cardfighter who aspires to enter the U20. Through a friendly match with him, Tokoha learns that despite Miguel's unluckiness, he is indeed a strong fighter and passionate about his dream of becoming a pro. The next day, Tokoha and Miguel spend the day together when she explains how she has yet to find a goal for herself. Nonetheless, Miguel expresses how he will wholeheartedly support her. Some time later, Jaime calls Tokoha and tells her that Miguel has died.
302 (106)	8	"Overcoming the Sea of Tears"; Transliteration: "Namida no Umi o Koete" (Japanese: 涙の海を越えて)	Masayuki Yamada	Kenji Konuta	November 20, 2016
Miguel's death has left Tokoha saddened. One day, a tour guide tells her about the history of the Eiffel Tower and how it inherits the feelings of its creator long after his death. This lights a spark in Tokoha, motivating her to have a cardfight with Jaime. Together, they realize that as long as they continue playing Vanguard, Miguel will live on in their hearts. After the battle, Tokoha decides she wants to enter the U20.
303 (107)	9	"The Flower Will Bloom Radiantly"; Transliteration: "Hana wa Mabushiku Sakihokoru" (Japanese: 花は眩しく咲き誇る)	Yoshitaka Fujimoto	Atsuo Ishino	November 27, 2016
Along with a disguised Jaime, Tokoha returns to Japan to form her team for the U20. She recruits her best friend Kumi Okizaki and Satoru Enishi, who has been working at the Dragon Empire Branch, wishing to show people the appeal of Vanguard. Tokoha visits Card Capital 2 where she reunites with Chrono and Taiyou and also meets Kazuma. Wanting to know more about Kazuma, she decides to have a cardfight with him. Although Kazuma tries his hardest, Tokoha manages to win. She offers him a handshake afterwards, but Kazuma refuses it and leaves, frustrated by his lack of power as a cardfighter.
304 (108)	10	"An Unsurpassable Existence"; Transliteration: "Koerarenai Mono" (Japanese: 超えられない存在(モノ))	Michita Shiraishi	Ayumu Hisao	December 4, 2016
Chrono, Tokoha, and Shion enter in a U20-qualifying tournament with their respective teams. In this tournament, players are randomly paired up, and the team with the most collective victories will get a guaranteed spot into the U20. As the tournament progresses, Kazuma eventually fights Mamoru. Believing to be on the verge of losing to Mamoru, Kazuma decides to quit before the fight properly concludes, which angers Chrono. He tries to ask Kazuma about his pessimism and convince him to just try, but this leads to a small fight between the two, ending with Kazuma leaving. At the end of the tournament, Shion's team, the Fukuhara Vanguard Club, is declared the winner, and Mamoru informs Chrono about thugs who are using Vanguard to attack people.
305 (109)	11	"To Me, You Are...!!"; Transliteration: "Ore ha Omae no...!!" (Japanese: 俺はお前の...！)	Yoshitaka Makino	Kiyoko Yoshimura	December 11, 2016
While Tokoha's team, Jaime Flowers, wins a U20-qualifying tournament, Kazuma calls Chrono and tells him that he is quitting the team. Chrono goes to confront Kazuma about this, but he ends up getting captured by a gang who mistake him for Kazuma. The real Kazuma appears and challenges the gang's leader for Chrono's freedom. With inspiring words from Chrono, Kazuma manages to win, and the police (called in by Taiyou) arrive and arrest the gang.
306 (110)	12	"The Last Chance"; Transliteration: "Saigo no Chansu" (Japanese: 最後のチャンス)	Ryōsuke Azuma	Kazuhiko Inukai	December 18, 2016
Chrono's team, Striders, enters a U20-qualifying tournament held at the first Card Capital shop; this is their last chance to qualify for the U20. However, because Kazuma has not shown up yet, Chrono and Taiyou must fight their way through the tournament by themselves. Striders eventually make it to the grand finals, where they face Team Trinity Dragon. In the first game, Taiyou loses to Karl. Then, Misaki tells Chrono that if Kazuma does not appear within ten minutes, then Striders will lose by default. Thankfully, Kazuma appears at the last possible second and fights Kei in the second game.
307 (111)	13	"Decisive Battle!!! Striders vs. Trinity Dragon!!!"; Transliteration: "Kessen!!! Sutoraidāzu VS Toriniti Doragon!!!" (Japanese: 決戦!!! ストライダーズVSトリニティドラゴン!!!)	Shigeharu Takahashi	Kenji Konuta	December 25, 2016
Kazuma defeats Kei, which means that the final conclusive game will be between Chrono and Tsuneto. Chrono struggles against Tsuneto, since Team Trinity Dragon has significantly improved their skills through training at Card Capital #1. Nonetheless, Chrono defeats Tsuneto, thus winning the tournament and qualifying his team to the U20.
308 (112)	14	"Are you ready to FIGHT!!"	Yukio Kuroda	Kazuhiko Inukai	January 8, 2017
Before the U20 starts, Chrono, Tokoha, and Shion have their own "send-off parties" with their respective teams. Jaime Flowers relax at a spa resort, the Fukuhara Vanguard Club has lunch on a cruise ship, and Striders engage in a curry-eating contest. At the end of the day, they are all treated to a fireworks show prepared by Shion. Then, the U20 Championship begins, where the other qualified teams are introduced and Kazuma is shocked to see Onimaru...
309 (113)	15	"Battlefield!! First Stage"; Transliteration: "Ransen!! Fāsuto sutēji" (Japanese: 乱戦!! ファーストステージ)	Yoshitaka Fujimoto	Atsuo Ishino	January 15, 2017
The U20 begins with its first stage, the Cray Scramble, in which fighters are scattered across a virtual field resembling the planet Cray. They will have to search for and battle other fighters to gain points, and the first sixteen teams to get fifty points will qualify for the second stage. Defeated fighters are temporarily eliminated but can be brought back if a fellow team member gets a win. As the first stage progresses, Chrono meets Team New Nippon, a group who admires and models itself after Team Nippon. He fights the leader of New Nippon, Arata Nishizawa, and defeats him. When the first day ends, everyone is stunned when they learn that Onimaru's Team Diffrider has already advanced with Onimaru beating Shion and Tokoha in the process.
310 (114)	16	"Dawn of Nippon"; Transliteration: "Nippon no Yoake" (Japanese: ニッポンの夜明け)	Yūsuke Suzuki; Kazuki Horiguchi	Ayumu Hisao	January 22, 2017
On the second day of the first stage, Kazuma faces Makoto Asada of Team New Nippon. While fighting, Makoto reminisces about the time when he first met Arata and how Team New Nippon was formed. Ultimately, Makoto defeats Kazuma. Just as Taiyou learns of this news, he comes across Tokoha.
311 (115)	17	"Signpost of Light"; Transliteration: "Hikari no Michishirube" (Japanese: 光の道標)	Yoshihiko Iwata	Kiyoko Yoshimura	January 29, 2017
Tokoha and Taiyou cardfight each other, with Taiyou wanting to win to get Kazuma back in the tournament. After a long and arduous battle, Taiyou manages to win, thus bringing Kazuma back into the fray and Tokoha once again knocked out.
312 (116)	18	"Mano A Mano"; Transliteration: "Otoko to Otoko" (Japanese: 漢と漢)	Nobuyoshi Nagayama	Kazuhiko Inukai	February 5, 2017
Enishi cardfights Kamui, who applies an enormous amount of pressure on him. In the middle of the battle, Enishi learns that Kumi has also lost, causing him to worry even more. However, Enishi withstands Kamui's attacks and defeats him, thus allowing Tokoha and Kumi to return to the tournament.
313 (117)	19	"Skyscraper of Craving"; Transliteration: "Katsubō no Matenrō" (Japanese: 渇望の摩天楼)	Akimi Fudesaka	Ayumu Hisao	February 12, 2017
The second day of the U20 first stage ends. As all the teams return to their homes, Chrono comes across Team New Nippon and has dinner with them. Meanwhile, Rin decides that she is fed up with being on the team. She challenges Shion to a cardfight on top of a skyscraper; if she wins, then she will quit. At first frustrated by Shion's reasons for wanting to enter the U20 in the first place, Rin rekindles her own fighting spirit through this fight. Afterwards, Rin decides to stay with the team.
314 (118)	20	"Unyielding Pirate"; Transliteration: "Fukutsu no Kaizokuki" (Japanese: 不屈の海賊姫)	Tatsunari Oyano; Ryōsuke Azuma	Atsuo Ishino	February 19, 2017
The third day of the U20 begins, where Henri gets starstruck when he faces Am Chouno. Despite the disadvantage her Granblue deck has against Henri's, Am defeats and then gives him a Rummy Labyrinth keychain. Afterwards, she, Luna, and Saya get reacquainted with Tokoha, Kumi, and Enishi.
315 (119)	21	"Fascinating Magia"; Transliteration: "Miwaku no Magia" (Japanese: 魅惑の奇術(マギア))	Daisuke Tsukushi	Kenji Konuta	February 26, 2017
The third day progresses with only eight teams remaining. Kazuma finds himself playing against Luna Yumizuki, who wants to make him smile through this fight. Though initially pressured by Luna, Kazuma defeats her and becomes a fan of hers. Meanwhile, Chrono loses to Nagisa, who mentions that Kamui entered the U20 because of Kouji. Chrono tries to ask Kamui about this but is unable to get an answer from him.
316 (120)	22	"Creeping Menace"; Transliteration: "Shinobiyoru Kyōi" (Japanese: 忍び寄る脅威)	Seiji Morita	Kiyoko Yoshimura	March 5, 2017
A sudden power outage occurs, which was caused by Onimaru and his team. Amidst the confusion, Onimaru tries to sneak his way into the field but is halted by Chrono and Kouji. Onimaru and Kouji have a cardfight with Chrono observing them. However, when the power comes back on, the fight is called off. Later, as the first stage resumes as normal, Onimaru returns to his original objective: a portal that Noa Hoshizaki of Team Nippon had accidentally stumbled upon. Inside the portal, Onimaru performs a Different World Ride, making Noa become possessed by Star-Vader, Chaos Breaker Dragon.
317 (121)	23	"Strong, Violent, and Beautiful"; Transliteration: "Tsuyoku Hageshiku Utsushiku" (Japanese: 強く激しく美しく)	Shigeharu Takahashi	Kazuhiko Inukai	March 12, 2017
Near the end of the first stage's third day, Tokoha fights and defeats her rival Rin, who has always been like a wall for her. With this victory, Tokoha's team advances to the second stage, which leaves only two spots remaining.
318 (122)	24	"The Knights Swear Victory Upon Their Swords"; Transliteration: "Kishi wa Tsurugi ni Shōri o Chikau" (Japanese: 騎士は剣に勝利を誓う)	Ryōsuke Azuma	Ayumu Hisao	March 19, 2017
The fourth day of the first stage ensues with Shion cardfighting Taiyou. Despite Taiyou learning about Shion's style from Chrono, Shion manages to win, thus gaining enough points for his team to advance to the second stage. Elsewhere, Chrono comes across Noa...
319 (123)	25	"Chaos of the End"; Transliteration: "Shūmaku no Kaosu" (Japanese: 終幕のカオス)	Yoshitaka Fujimoto	Kiyoko Yoshimura	March 26, 2017
All eyes turn to the cardfight between Chrono and Noa; whoever wins will earn his team the last spot to the second stage. As the fight goes on, Chrono slowly realizes that Noa is not acting like his usual self and is reminded of the time when he fought Onimaru. Despite overbearing pressure from Noa, Chrono makes a comeback victory, thus allowing Team Striders to advance to the second stage.
320 (124)	26	"Return of the Vanguard!" (Japanese: 帰還の先導者(ヴァンガード))	Nobuyoshi Nagayama	Ayumu Hisao	April 2, 2017
Chrono is invited to the first Card Capital shop where he is introduced to Aichi Sendou. After Aichi gets reacquainted with his old friends, he and Kamui take Chrono back to Card Capital 2 to meet with Kouji. Along the way, Chrono gets to learn more about Aichi, who later gives him a new Gear Chronicle card that has a hefty activation cost. When the trio reaches the shop, Kouji is not present. To pass the time till he arrives, Chrono and Aichi decide to have a cardfight.
321 (125)	27	"Chrono vs. Aichi"; Transliteration: "Kurono tai Aichi" (Japanese: クロノVSアイチ)	Sumito Sasaki	Kazuhiko Inukai	April 9, 2017
Chrono and Aichi engage in a heated cardfight. Although Chrono tries his best to fulfill the conditions of the new card he got from Aichi, he is defeated before getting the chance to use it. Later, when Kouji and Kai arrive, they intend to leave with Aichi and Kamui. Chrono wants to come along, but Kouji decides to test him to see if he is worthy enough.
322 (126)	28	"Ibuki's Trial"; Transliteration: "Ibuki no Shiren" (Japanese: 伊吹の試練)	Takeyuki Satohara; Noriyuki Nakamura	Kiyoko Yoshimura	April 16, 2017
To see if Chrono is strong enough for the challenges to come, Kouji cardfights him. Chrono manages to use the card given to him by Aichi, Beyond Order Dragon, to its fullest potential and defeat Kouji with it. With Chrono proving himself, he goes with Kouji and the others to see someone who knows about Team Diffrider: Nome Tatsunagi.
323 (127)	29	"Diffrider From Another World"; Transliteration: "Isekai kara no Difuraidā" (Japanese: 異世界からの憑依者(ディフライダー))	Naoki Hishikawa	Kiyoko Yoshimura	April 23, 2017
Chrono and the others meet and consult with Nome Tatsunagi, who tells them what has been going on. According to him, there are units who come from Planet Cray and possess fighters via a method called "Different World Ride", or "Diffride" for short. However, in the case of Onimaru and Noa, they have been possessed by evil units.
324 (128)	30	"The Light from Before"; Transliteration: "Ano Hi Mita Kagayaki" (Japanese: あの日見た輝き)	Yoshito Hata	Atsuo Ishino	April 30, 2017
The U20 continues into its second stage. Dubbed the Castle Royale, fighters will battle each other in a five-tiered castle area. The first four teams to reach the top of the castle and have the highest number of points will then advance to the final stage. Furthermore, unlike the first stage, once a fighter loses a match, they will be eliminated with no chance of returning into battle. As the Castle Royale goes underway, Taiyou fights and loses to Team Diffrider's Verno Farenheart.
325 (129)	31	"Fragile Living Things"; Transliteration: "Zeijaku Naru Seibutsu-tachi" (Japanese: 脆弱なる生物達)	Shigeharu Takahashi	Kenji Konuta	May 7, 2017
Tokoha faces Team Diffrider's Saori Fuchidaka, who is possessed by Flare Trooper, Dumjid and thinks poorly of humans. Before being defeated, Tokoha is drawn into an image of a battlefield on the Planet Cray, showing her the horror of death. This reminds her of a similar event when she met Miguel...
326 (130)	32	"Evil Eye Sovereign"; Transliteration: "Yokoshima me no Shihai-sha" (Japanese: 邪眼の支配者)	Masashi Abe	Kazuhiko Inukai	May 14, 2017
During Tokoha's battle against Saori, Enishi challenges Onimaru, who had already beaten Am, Luna, and Kumi while trampling on their feelings of Vanguard being fun. Following his friend Miguel's death, Onimaru has lost faith in humanity, but he changes his mind when Enishi almost pushes him towards defeat. However, using the Domination effect to turn Enishi's rear-guards against him, Onimaru wins. With that, Team Jaime Flowers is eliminated from the U20.
327 (131)	33	"Potential of Humans"; Transliteration: "Ningen no Kanōsei" (Japanese: 人間の可能性)	Yoshitaka Fujimoto	Ayumu Hisao	May 21, 2017
The first day of the second stage nears its end as Chrono fights Saori. Thinking that he has this battle won, Saori is shocked when he sees Chrono render him unable to guard against his attack and make a comeback victory. Afterwards, Chrono rushes to Kazuma, who is currently fighting Onimaru.
328 (132)	34	"Brothers' Reunion"; Transliteration: "Ani to no Saikai" (Japanese: 兄との再会)	Ichizō Kobayashi	Kiyoko Yoshimura	May 28, 2017
Kazuma and Onimaru clash in a battle between step-brothers. When they were younger, they lived and played Vanguard happily together. However, due to Kazuma's mother marrying into the Onimaru family, he was shunned, looked down upon, and eventually exiled from the family. Furthermore, Kazuma could never beat Onimaru in a cardfight. Although Kazuma has matured since then, he is still unable to beat Onimaru. As Onimaru walks away disappointed in Kazuma, he tries to rush towards him but is stopped by Chrono, who now learns of the two's brother relationship.
329 (133)	35	"Liberation from Destiny"; Transliteration: "Unmei no Kaihō" (Japanese: 運命の解放)	Seiji Morita	Kiyoko Yoshimura	June 4, 2017
Although the first day of the U20's second stage ends, Chrono challenges Onimaru to a cardfight. During the battle, Chrono exposes Onimaru as being possessed by a unit from Cray: Stealth Dragon, Shiranui. He asks about Onimaru's motives, and he responds it is to be liberated from destiny. As he puts it, Vanguard is what connects the planets Earth and Cray, and the fights that occur on Earth affect Cray, which Onimaru cannot tolerate anymore. Not wanting his future to be decided by a greater power, Onimaru's goal is to sever the bond between Earth and Cray by destroying Vanguard. Onimaru defeats Chrono and takes his leave.
330 (134)	36	"Fukuhara's Choice"; Transliteration: "Fukuhara no Sentaku" (Japanese: 福原の選択)	Ryūtarō Suzuki	Atsuo Ishino	June 11, 2017
The second day of the second stage begins. Although the Fukuhara club decided to avoid the stronger teams including Chrono's, Henri cardfights Verno. Upon learning this, Shion rushes over to Henri, who tells him to play Vanguard the way he wants and not for Fukuhara's best interest. After Henri shockingly defeats Verno, Shion catches up to Chrono and challenges him.
331 (135)	37	"Our Vanguard"; Transliteration: "Oretachi no Vu~angādo" (Japanese: 俺達のヴァンガード)	Naoki Hishikawa	Ayumu Hisao	June 18, 2017
In spite of the high stakes, Chrono and Shion thoroughly enjoy their cardfight which reminds everyone of how fun Vanguard can be.
332 (136)	38	"Beyond this Sky"; Transliteration: "Kono Sora no Saki ni" (Japanese: この空の先に)	Tomoya Takahashi	Kazuhiko Inukai	June 25, 2017
The U20's second stage ends with Team Diffrider, Striders, and the Fukuhara Club advancing to the final stage. Additionally, there will be a repechage in which a disqualified team will earn the chance to enter the final stage alongside the other three. Afterwards, Jaime takes Chrono, Shion, Tokoha, and all of their friends to a deserted island where he reveals the true intentions of Team Diffrider. Later, everyone prepares dinner while further bonding with their teammates.
333 (137)	39	"Beacon of Revival"; Transliteration: "Fukkatsu no Noroshi" (Japanese: 復活の狼煙)	Noriyuki Nakamura	Kenji Konuta	July 2, 2017
Team Jaime Flowers fight Rummy Labyrinth with Saya in the repechage. Afterwards, the matchups for the U20's final stage are decided, with Diffrider facing the Fukuhara Club and Jaime Flowers against Striders.
334 (138)	40	"Oath of Striders"; Transliteration: "Sutoraidāzu no Chikai" (Japanese: ストライダーズの誓い)	Itsuro Kawasaki	Atsuo Ishino	July 9, 2017
Chrono and Taiyou have a little chat, recalling the birth of Team Striders, struggled all the way until the present time, with Kazuma joining them a little while longer. The three made an oath to complete and win the U20 together side by side.
335 (139)	41	"Fukuhara High Vanguard Club VS Team Diffrider"; Transliteration: "Fukuhara Kōkō Vu~angādo-bu VS Chīmu Difuraidā" (Japanese: 福原高校ヴァンガード部VSチーム・ディフライダー)	Kei Miura	Kazuhiko Inukai	July 16, 2017
Team Fukuhara High Vanguard Club fights Team Diffrider with Verno fighting Rin in the first fight. When the fight progresses, Verno really enjoys the heat of the fight, while Rin looked down on her attitude. The fight resulted with Rin winning the first match, continued by Hayao fighting Saori.
336 (140)	42	"Overcoming Heaven's Decree"; Transliteration: "Tenmei o Koete" (Japanese: 天命を超えて)	Yoshitaka Fujimoto	Kiyoko Yoshimura	July 23, 2017
The fight resulted with Saori scored a win on the first match against Hayao with double critical trigger which passed Hayao's guard. Then the battle between Fukuhara High Cardfight Club VS Team Diffrider is continued by Onimaru VS Shion. Shion lost the battle, resulting in the team's elimination. Though losing, the crowd cheered on them.
337 (141)	43	"Striders VS Jaime Flowers"; Transliteration: "Sutoraidāzu VS Haime Furawāzu" (Japanese: ストライダーズVSハイメフラワーズ)	Fumihiro Ueno	Atsuo Ishino	July 30, 2017
The curtain of the second semi-final opens! Kumi from team Jaime flowers and Taiyou from team Striders face each other in an intense battle. Kumi is able to push Taiyou into a corner with a triple critical! but Taiyou still manages to win. Now the next two players Kazuma and Enishi face each other in a fierce battle. Both burning in the desire of winning, fight passionately. The audience is fired up. How will this fierce battle end?
338 (142)	44	"Heat of Searing Heart"; Transliteration: "Munewokogasu Atsu-sa" (Japanese: 胸を焦がす熱さ)	Seiji Morita	Ayumu Hisao	August 6, 2017
Team TRY3 face-off again! The two former teammates, Chrono Shindou and Tokoha Anjou, fight with their fresh determination! In order to reach the finals, they fight without hesitation this is the battle that will decide the team that will go to the final round. All the eyes are set on the two of them.
339 (143)	45	"Special Training with Kanzaki"; Transliteration: "Kanzaki to no Tokkun" (Japanese: 神崎との特訓)	Kaoru Yabana	Kazuhiko Inukai	August 13, 2017
Chrono Shindou and Taiyou Asukawa decide to take Kazuma Shouji to the mountains with the purpose of having special training there with Yuichirou Kanzaki!!. Kanzaki and Kazuma face each other in an epic battle both the players exhibit the full power of their Shadow Paladin. This turned out to be the amazing Shadow Paladin Showdown between Kanzaki and Kazuma!
340 (144)	46	"Verno's Challenge"; Transliteration: "Beruno no Chōsen" (Japanese: ベルノの挑戦)	Naoki Hishikawa	Kiyoko Yoshimura	August 20, 2017
Verno Fahrenheart challenges Tokoha Anjou to a fight before the U20 Finals. Tokoha reveals the true identity and scheme of Kazumi Onimaru to Verno. What will she do upon learning this......!?
341 (145)	47	"To the Limit of Radiance"; Transliteration: "Kagayaki no Hate ni" (Japanese: 輝きの果てに)	Ryūtarō Suzuki	Kenji Konuta	August 27, 2017
342 (146)	48	"Dragon's Awakening"; Transliteration: "Kakusei no Ryū" (Japanese: 覚醒の竜)	Yoshihiko Iwata	Atsuo Ishino	September 3, 2017
343 (147)	49	"Battle of the Brothers"; Transliteration: "Kyōdai Kessen" (Japanese: 兄弟決戦)	Noriyuki Nakamura	Ayumu Hisao	September 10, 2017
344 (148)	50	"Entrusted Wishes"; Transliteration: "Takusareta Omoi" (Japanese: 託された思い)	Yoshitaka Fujimoto	Kiyoko Yoshimura	September 17, 2017
345 (149)	51	"Power to Surpass"; Transliteration: "Koeru Chikara" (Japanese: 超える力)	Seiji Morita; Ryūtarō Suzuki	Kiyoko Yoshimura	September 24, 2017
346 (150)	52	"Return"; Transliteration: "Kikan" (Japanese: 帰還)	Kō Nakagawa	Kiyoko Yoshimura	October 1, 2017
