= Cardfight!! Vanguard G: GIRS Crisis =

- Official English dub title screen
- No. of episodes: 26

Release
- Original network: TV Tokyo; Daisuki
- Original release: October 11, 2015 – April 10, 2016

Series chronology
- ← Previous; Cardfight!! Vanguard G Next → Stride Gate

Cardfight!! Vanguard G: GIRS Crisis is the second season of Cardfight!! Vanguard G and the sixth season overall in the Cardfight!! Vanguard series and the second of The TRY 3 Saga. It was broadcast on TV Tokyo from October 11, 2015, to April 10, 2016, airing 26 episodes. It was made available for streaming to Daisuki, Crunchyroll and YouTube.

== Plot ==
A couple months have passed since the events of G. Chrono is unsure about what he wants to do with his life, while Shion plans on taking over his family's company and Tokoha seems to have an idea about what she wants to do. With the announcement of the G Quest, Team TRY3 plan on becoming Generation masters. However, they must solve a mystery, which involves the loss of Shion's family company, and finding how a man named Ryuzu Myojin plans on using the G Quest to awaken the remaining Depend cards. Team TRY3 will have to face new challenges from friends both new and old, while Chrono tries to awaken the three Depend Cards he has. TRY3 must push their Vanguard skills to the next level, not only to reach their future, but also to save both Earth and Planet Cray. Plan G has officially begun, and there's no going back.

== Main characters ==
- Chrono Shindou – Gear Chronicle clan user
- Tokoha Anjou – Neo Nectar clan user
- Shion Kiba – Royal Paladin clan user
- Jaime Alcaraz – Aqua Force clan user
- Luna Yumizuki – Pale Moon clan user
- Am Chouno – Granblue clan user
- Kouji Ibuki – Link Joker clan user
- Kamui Katsuragi – Nova Grappler clan user

== Antagonists ==
- Ryuzu Myoujin
- Ace (later revealed to be Am in disguise) – Granblue clan user
- Shouma Shinonome – Genesis clan user

== Theme songs ==
Opening theme

- "YAIBA" by Breakerz – Original Version (eps. 245–270)
- "Break It" by Mamoru Miyano – Dubbed Version (eps. 245–270)

Ending theme

- "Don't Look Back" by Rummy Labyrinth (Aimi Terakawa & Haruka Kudō) (eps. 245–270)

== Episode list ==
No. overall	No. in series	Title	Directed by	Written by	Original release date
245	49	"Quest Begins! / The G Quest Begins!"; Transliteration: "Ji Kuesuto Kaimaku!" (Japanese: Gクエスト開幕！)	Ryōsuke Senbo	Kazuhiko Inukai	October 11, 2015
Chrono, Shion, and Tokoha teach a girl named Luna Yumizuki how to play Vanguard. After the teaching fight, Luna departs but accidentally leaves behind one of her cards. Later, TRY3 watches the announcement of the special Generation Quest. This quest will involve all 6 branches while reuniting fighters from the past and present, and the winners will become clan leaders. As TRY3 gets excited to take on the G Quest, they also learn that Luna is part of an idol group, Rummy Labyrinth, and has a partner named Am Chouno. Elsewhere, Kouji initiates Plan-G...
246	50	"Special Aqua Force"; Transliteration: "Supesharu Akua Fōsu" (Japanese: スペシャルアクアフォース)	Masahiro Sonoda	Kiyoko Yoshimura	October 18, 2015
Team TRY3 heads to the Magallanica Branch for their first venture in the G Quest. After learning more details about the G Quest, they partake in the branch's quest, a team tournament in which the winning group will face the Special Aqua Force team, composed of Jaime and Team Dreadnought. TRY3 makes it to the finals with Tokoha facing Jaime, Shion against Sharlene, and Chrono fighting Leon, the Aqua Force clan leader.
247	51	"Chrono vs. Leon"; Transliteration: "Kurono VS Reon" (Japanese: クロノVSレオン)	Yukio Kuroda	Kazuhiko Inukai	October 25, 2015
Chrono withstands wave after wave of Leon's onslaught and mounts a comeback victory. Tokoha and Shion then win their fights, meaning that TRY3 has conquered their first G quest.
248	52	"Ace's Trap"; Transliteration: "Ēsu no Wana" (Japanese: エースの罠)	Masahiko Matsunaga	Kiyoko Yoshimura	November 1, 2015
Shion is officially named the Kiba heir and given the family heirloom, an ancient sword that supposedly glows when held by the true Kiba heir. Shortly after, he is challenged by a young boy named "Ace". Not only is Ace's corporation trying to take over the Kiba foundation, but he has also tricked Shion's uncle Utsugi into stealing the sword for him. With much at stake, Shion cardfights Ace, both using decks made out of cards pulled from random booster packs. When Shion sees the sword shining in Utsugi's hands, he loses both his fighting spirit and the battle. Ace later reveals that their fight was captured on video to smear Shion's credibility as Kiba heir, the glowing sword was a mere trick, and Utsugi was working with Ace all along. In the end, Ace's takeover of the Kiba company is successful, which forces Shion to start living by himself while his parents and Iwakura seek help elsewhere. Nonetheless, Shion vows to get revenge on Ace.
249	53	"Rummy Labyrinth"; Transliteration: "Ramī Rabirinsu" (Japanese: ラミーラビリンス)	Junichirō Hashiguchi	Miya Asakawa	November 8, 2015
TRY3 helps with preparations for a G Quest event to be held in the Dragon Empire branch. They meet, work with, and learn about the members of Rummy Labyrinth throughout the day. When Am's most prized possession gets lost in the trash, TRY3 and Luna desperately search and retrieve it to Am's joy and gratitude. As the friendship between Luna and Am grows, TRY3 briefly meets Kamui's old friends: Naoki, Miwa, Shingo, and Kai. At the end of the day, Shion, who had been putting up a brave front over the Ace takeover incident, is revealed to truly be depressed over it. Then, he encounters Kai...
250	54	"A Stormy Night"; Transliteration: "Arashi no Yoru" (Japanese: 嵐の夜)	Yūsuke Onoda	Daisuke Ishibashi	November 15, 2015
On a stormy night, Shion cardfights and loses to Kai multiple times. This makes Shion feel helpless and powerless but eventually realize that he can do more, thus gaining more confidence and determination. The next day, the Dragon Empire branch's G Quest begins. It is a city-wide treasure hunt with participants trying to gather as many treasure points as possible. However, there are "chasers" who will impede them along the way, but defeating them in battle will award a lot of points. After TRY3 splits up, Chrono and Tokoha cardfight and defeat two chasers: Naoki and Shingo, respectively.
251	55	"Shion's Awakening"; Transliteration: "Kakusei no Shion" (Japanese: 覚醒のシオン)	Ryōsuke Senbo	Ayumu Hisao	November 22, 2015
While Shion fights as many chasers as possible, Chrono and Tokoha end up imprisoned after they both fall for some of the G Quest's traps. To rescue them, Shion must defeat the "prison guard" Miwa. Shion has a tough time due to Miwa's Seal Dragon deck benefiting from his normal tactics. Nevertheless, with new-found resolve to change himself, Shion sticks to his strategy and ultimately wins the fight. Soon afterwards, the quest ends with Shion having gained the majority of the points and thus making Team TRY3 the winner. Then, Kai approaches Shion and says that he will be waiting for him at the Star Gate branch.
252	56	"A Place of Chance Meetings"; Transliteration: "Meguriau Basho" (Japanese: めぐりあう場所)	Yukio Kuroda	Kenichi Yamada	November 29, 2015
While Shion continues his search for Ace and Chrono visits various card shops for special training, Tokoha feels left behind. While wondering what to do, Tokoha ends up helping Misaki run a tournament at Card Capital 2. After the tournament ends, Misaki decides to have a cardfight with Tokoha. Misaki sympathizes with her after having experienced the same feelings that Tokoha is going through. When Misaki was pondering what to do with her life after graduating from high school, she saw an event where two boys have a touching reunion through Vanguard. It was that moment in which Misaki knew what she wanted to do: to watch over Card Capital, believing card shops are precious places of chance meetings where people can become friends and continue to build relationships. After the fight, Tokoha now realizes what she can do, learning from Misaki to just be herself.
253	57	"Zoo Branch"; Transliteration: "Zū Shibu" (Japanese: Zoo支部)	Toshio Kiuchi	Kiyoko Yoshimura	December 6, 2015
TRY3 and the unlikely team of Naoki, Shingo, and Luna take part in the Zoo branch's G Quest. The preliminary round of this quest has teams cooking a dish that must have one specific ingredient (pineapple). Teams can search for ingredients in the branch's natural farm, but they must fight guards cosplaying as Megacolony units to obtain them. At the end of the round, TRY3 emerges victorious, meaning that one of their members will face the special guest, Christopher Lo. Before the last fight, Naoki tells TRY3 that the Planet Cray really exists and to ask Kamui for more information. Full of confidence after finding a new goal to achieve, Tokoha fights and defeats Chris in the final match of the quest. However, at the awards ceremony, more Megacolony units appear and say the true G Quest of the Zoo branch has now just begun.
254	58	"Legendary "D""; Transliteration: "Densetsu no Dī" (Japanese: 伝説のD)	Masahiro Sonoda	Kazuhiko Inukai	December 13, 2015
To truly clear the Zoo branch's quest, TRY3 goes through more challenges. First, they defeat a hundred Megacolony soldiers in a short amount of time (using toy weapons). Then, while forced to cosplay as Card Warriors Vanguamen, they face off against Team Trinity Dragon in a battle of wits. Finally, Chrono cardfights the "final boss", Daigo. Learning from Daigo's words, Chrono regains his resolve and wins against him. With that, TRY3 officially completes the Zoo branch's G Quest.
255	59	"Naked Fight"; Transliteration: "Hadaka no Faito" (Japanese: 裸のファイト)	Masahiko Matsunaga	Kiyoko Yoshimura	December 20, 2015
Kamui confirms to Chrono that the planet Cray does exist and to ask Kouji for more details about it. Then, Kamui has Chrono, Team Trinity Dragon, and eventually Shion undergo special image training at a public bathhouse. At the end of the rough training session, only Chrono could last long enough to have a cardfight against Kamui. While battling, Kamui notes Chrono's reluctance to see Kouji and tells him to just go through with it. By the end of the day, Chrono decides that the next G Quest for TRY3 will be at the Star Gate branch, where Kouji and Kai are waiting.
256	60	"Kai's Lightning"; Transliteration: "Kai no Inazuma" (Japanese: 櫂のイナズマ)	Yūsuke Onoda	Daisuke Ishibashi	December 27, 2015
TRY3 takes on the Star Gate branch's G Quest. The goal is simple but has yet to be conquered by anyone: defeat either Kai or Kouji. Through this quest, Shion gets a rematch against Kai, who tests him with his Narukami deck. Despite going through many hardships and his best efforts, Shion ultimately loses to Kai. Nonetheless, Shion stays determined to get stronger, and Kai is left impressed with TRY3's progress.
257	61	"Kouji's Miscalculation / Ibuki's Miscalculation"; Transliteration: "Ibuki no Gosan" (Japanese: 伊吹の誤算)	Yoshitaka Nagaoka	Ayumu Hisao	January 10, 2016
The next fight for TRY3 at the branch is another rematch: Chrono versus Kouji, who quickly gains the upper hand and expresses disappointment over Chrono's lack of growth as a fighter. However, he rebukes that Kouji has also done things that irritate him, specifically when he gave Chrono three blank Depend Cards but not telling him what to do with them. Just as Chrono makes his final attack, he is pulled into another vision that shows a new Gear Chronicle unit, much like with Chrono Dran. In the end, Chrono defeats Kouji again, and one of his Depend Cards now has that unit on it. After the awards ceremony, Kouji speaks privately with TRY3, informing the team more about Depend Cards, Plan G, and Ryuzu Myoujin's ambitions.
258	62	"Card Capital #1"; Transliteration: "Kādo Kyapitaru Ichigōten" (Japanese: カードキャピタル一号店)	Junichirō Hashiguchi	Miya Asakawa	January 17, 2016
Chrono, Kamui, and Team Trinity Dragon attend a tournament held at the first Card Capital shop. There, Chrono plays against past fighters including Eru Nakagami, Katsumi Morikawa, and Emi Sendou. Through those fights, Chrono is reminded of how much fun Vanguard is.
259	63	"Mikuru Shindou"; Transliteration: "Shindō Mikuru" (Japanese: 新導ミクル)	Ryōsuke Senbo	Kenichi Yamada	January 24, 2016
After the tournament, Shin talks with Chrono and reveals that he and Chrono's father Rive were friends and teammates. Knowing that Chrono wants to face Ryuzu Myoujin and despite warning him that he may die, Shin decides to have a cardfight with Chrono to test his resolve. During the battle, Shin reveals Myoujin was involved in Rive's death, which causes Chrono to worry that Mikuru will be put in danger as well. But with some encouraging words from Mikuru, Chrono makes up his mind; he will protect both her and Vanguard from Myoujin.
260	64	"Vanguard Girls' Meet"; Transliteration: "Vangādo Joshikai" (Japanese: ヴァンガード女子会)	Toshio Kiuchi	Kazuhiko Inukai	January 31, 2016
To help Luna's relationship with Am, Tokoha and Kumi get them together and have a fun day just for the girls. Later on, Tokoha and Am have a cardfight after a disagreement over their favorite food toppings, and Kumi and Luna join in the fight. By the end of the day, Luna and Am's friendship deepens, but Am is reminded of a terrible accident that happened when she was 5 years old.
261	65	"Shion vs. Ace"; Transliteration: "Shion VS Ēsu" (Japanese: シオンVSエース)	Fumihiro Ueno	Kiyoko Yoshimura	February 7, 2016
Shion finally manages to call out Ace and challenges him to a cardfight. While battling, Shion reveals all he has learned about Ace, including that the mastermind behind everything is Ryuzu Myoujin. But before Shion could get Ace to confess (to a hidden camera), a biker rides in and escapes with Ace. During the escape, Shion sees that Ace's true identity is Am.
262	66	"TRY3 vs Asteroid / TRY3 vs. AL4"; Transliteration: "Toraisurī VS Erufō" (Japanese: トライスリーVSAL4)	Yoshitaka Nagaoka	Kazuhiko Inukai	February 14, 2016
TRY3's next venture in the G Quest is at the new and improved United Sanctuary Branch, which is now under the management of Ren Suzugamori and Team AL4. Making their way through a qualifying team tournament, TRY3 earns the right to play against AL4 in a relay cardfight. Amazingly, Tokoha defeats both Kyou and Asaka but must now face Ren.
263	67	"Chrono vs. Ren"; Transliteration: "Kurono VS Ren" (Japanese: クロノVSレン)	Masahiro Sonoda	Ayumu Hisao	February 21, 2016
Ren beats both Tokoha and Shion, which means it is all up to Chrono. Using the cards left by his teammates, Chrono defeats Ren, thus completing the branch's G Quest. At that moment, one of Chrono's Depend Cards becomes inhabited by a new Gear Chronicle unit. As a reward, Ren informs TRY3 about the true purpose of Plan G: to pinpoint Myoujin's location and put a stop to his ambitions. Furthermore, he tells them that once they fully complete the G Quest and awaken Chrono's last Depend Card, Plan G will move on to the next phase: GIRS Crisis.
264	68	"Darkness of the Association"; Transliteration: "Fukyū Kyōkai no Yami" (Japanese: 普及協会の闇)	Masahiko Matsunaga	Daisuke Ishibashi	February 28, 2016
Following some rumors, Kamui goes to a seemingly abandoned facility. He meets both Mamoru and Team Trinity Dragon, and they are chased by a robot. After escaping the robot, they discover a secret laboratory, which turns out to be one of Myoujin's Stride Force relay stations. They also learn that the FICAs of all fighters have been gathering Stride Force for Myoujin to use (to summon units from Cray as part of his ambitions). The group is then confronted by the person in charge of this facility, the crazy Kensuke Handa. He separates Kamui from his friends and challenges him to a cardfight. While Mamoru and Trinity Dragon try to escape, Kamui defeats Handa and demands him to reveal all he knows about Myoujin. However, the facility activates its self-destruct mechanism, and Handa falls through a trap hole. Mamoru returns to save Kamui from the explosion. Although everyone made it out safely, Mamoru expresses frustration over how he had been helping Myoujin's plans the whole time.
265	69	"Dark Zone's Trap"; Transliteration: "Dāku Zōn Shibu no Wana" (Japanese: ダークゾーン支部の罠)	Kenichi Maejima	Kiyoko Yoshimura	March 6, 2016
TRY3 takes on their last G Quest at the Dark Zone Branch. This time, the goal is to ascend a maze tower within a time limit. However, instead of participating, players can instead choose to be "creatures" to stop TRY3 and special guest Rummy Labyrinth from completing this quest and be handsomely rewarded if successful. This naturally makes all the other fighters want to become creatures, thus making TRY3 and Rummy Labyrinth the only participants in the quest. As the quest goes on, Tokoha, Shion, and Am all decide to stay behind to let their respective teammates Chrono and Luna make their way to the top. As they both reached the top before the time limit expired, there is a final fight between Chrono and Luna. Meanwhile, Shion fights Am and confirms that she is Ace. In the end, despite Luna's strong feelings, Chrono wins and awakens his last Depend Card in the process. With that, TRY3 complete all of the G Quests with a perfect record. Afterwards, Kouji approaches TRY3 and gives the team an invitation to the G Quest Ultimate Stage.
266	70	"Night Before the Showdown"; Transliteration: "Kessen Zenya" (Japanese: 決戦前夜)	Junichirō Hashiguchi	Miya Asakawa; Kiyoko Yoshimura	March 13, 2016
The G Quest ends after 3 months, and an award ceremony is held in honor of the teams, including TRY3, that have earned the title of "Generation Master". As a grand finale, there is a special match arranged for TRY3 to face a "dream team" selected by the Vanguard Association. During the time before the match, Shion tells his teammates that Am is Ace, which makes Tokoha want to learn why she is working with Myoujin. Later, the day of the special match arrives, and TRY3's opponent is revealed to be Team Q4, consisting of Misaki, Kamui, and Kai. Behind the scenes, Kouji and his comrades begin "GIRS Crisis", a plan that will ultimately locate Myoujin.
267	71	"Showdown! Team Q4 – Tokoha vs. Misaki"; Transliteration: "Kessen! Chīmu Q4 Tokoha VS Misaki" (Japanese: 決戦！チームQ4 トコハVSミサキ)	Yūsuke Onoda	Kenichi Yamada	March 20, 2016
The match of TRY3 vs. Q4 bears another meaning for TRY3; if Chrono and his teammates cannot beat Q4, then they will not be allowed to face Myoujin. The first game pits Tokoha against Misaki, who is using her Tsukuyomi deck. Despite Misaki returning cards into her deck and memorizing how she stacked her cards, Tokoha holds on by defending herself with the new Generation Guard mechanic. Tokoha then wins on the next turn, and Misaki is left satisfied with how far she has come.
268	72	"Shion vs. Kai"; Transliteration: "Shion VS Kai" (Japanese: シオンVS櫂)	Eiichi Kuboyama	Ayumu Hisao	March 27, 2016
The second fight of the special match is Shion vs. Kai, who is using his Overlord deck. Shion attacks aggressively at the start, but Kai quickly closes the gap and puts him a nearly hopeless situation akin to the cardfights from their first encounter. This time however, Shion keeps his composure and miraculously defeats Kai.
269	73	"Chrono vs. Kamui"; Transliteration: "Kurono VS Kamui" (Japanese: クロノVSカムイ)	Fumihiro Ueno	Kiyoko Yoshimura	April 3, 2016
The last game of the special match is Chrono vs. Kamui. Chrono intends to surpass Kamui, who acted as his mentor the whole time. On the other hand, Kamui wants to beat Chrono in order to prevent him from fighting Myoujin and from suffering a possibly horrible fate. Backstage, Shion and Tokoha confront Am and try to convince her to stop working for Myoujin, but Shouma Shinonome suddenly shows up before them. After Shouma reveals how he was involved in the Kiba takeover, thereby revealing his affiliation with Myoujin, Shion furiously starts pummeling him. Kouji appears and stops Shion, and after some taunting from Shouma, he leaves with Am. As the cardfight between Chrono and Kamui reaches its climax, the countdown to GIRS Crisis begins.
270	74	"GIRS Crisis"; Transliteration: "Giāsu Kuraishisu" (Japanese: ギアースクライシス)	Toshio Kiuchi	Kiyoko Yoshimura	April 10, 2016
Just as Chrono delivers the finishing blow to Kamui, GIRS Crisis commences. By having fighters from all over the world flood the GIRS system with Stride Force and crashing it, Kouji and his companions are able to pinpoint the spot where Stride Force is still being gathered, which is deduced to be Ryuzu's main base of operations. Shortly after the members of TRY3 celebrate their victory over Q4, Kouji informs them that they will soon infiltrate Ryuzu's lab. However, Ryuzu prepares for them...
