= Cardfight!! Vanguard G =

- No. of episodes: 48

Release
- Original network: TV Tokyo
- Original release: October 26, 2014 – October 4, 2015

Series chronology
- ← Previous; Legion Mate (Generation 1) Next → GIRS Crisis

Cardfight!! Vanguard G is the fifth season of Cardfight!! Vanguard and the first season of the G series. and the first chapter of The TRY 3 Saga. It aired in Japan from October 26, 2014, to October 4, 2015, for 48 episodes.

== Plot ==
Set 3 years later after the events of Legion Mate, the story follows Chrono Shindou, an apathetic teenager who finds a Vanguard deck and a map in his school locker one day. Following the map, he is led to Card Capital 2, a card shop where he meets Kamui Katsuragi who works part-time there. After being taught how to play Vanguard and winning his first fight against Kamui, Chrono begins his venture in the world of Vanguard. Chrono finds Vanguard enjoyable, so he decides to return to Card Capital 2, where he takes up a quest and becomes a Grade 1 fighter. Then, he meets and fights Kouji Ibuki, who reveals that Chrono is and always has been completely alone. As a result, Ibuki crushes Chrono with no difficulty and refuses to even tell Chrono his name until Chrono becomes stronger. Over the next few days, Chrono meets and Shion Kiba and Tokoha Anjou (although his first encounter with both of them was not so pleasant but they slowly become very good friends). Chrono also makes an acquaintance of Mamoru Anjou, the Kagero clan leader, and Jaime Alcaraz, the Spanish ace of the European League.

FIVA is holding a national tournament, and the only one not excited is Tokoha. As she is the younger sister of Mamoru, people expect her to follow her brother's footsteps. But she wants to carve her own path and is tired of being forced to live up to her brother's legacy. Meanwhile, Chrono is trying to get enough points by doing quests so he can get to Grade 3 in order to enter the tournament. In the end Tokoha decides to enter the tournament as well. Chrono, Shion, and Tokoha try to find teammates for entering the tournament. One day Kamui calls the three of them in Card Capital 2 and informs them that he has registered the three of them as a team for the tournament (he actually didn't but he tricked them). Chrono, Shion and Tokoha get irritated and angry at this news.

Kamui tests their teamwork through a variety of exercises, but the trio exhibits no sign of team harmony whatsoever. Then, Kamui has the three play against Team Trinity Dragon in a special cardfight in which each team member will switch with another after each turn. Throughout the fight, Chrono, Tokoha, and Shion constantly argue with each other about their playing methods. With excellent synergy, Trinity Dragon wins, leaving Kamui to believe that there is no hope for Chrono's team. Desperate to prove Kamui wrong (although he was really faking it), Chrono, Tokoha, and Shion become determined to make their unnamed team successful. They later name their team Team TRY3 and enter the National Tournament together.

At the regional qualifier, Team TRY3 fights Team Demise. They ultimately turn out to be a very powerful team. Chrono wins against the first fighter of Team Demise (Sugiru Kariya). However, Shion and Tokoha ultimately lose in their respective card fights. In the aftermath of their defeat Chrono's aunt discovers Chrono's new hobby and reveals the truth behind his father, who disappeared 10 years ago because of Vanguard. Team TRY3 visits the United Sanctuary branch, seeking a rematch with Team Demise. They find that the United Sanctuary branch is turning card fighters into people obsessed with winning by brain washing them and by forcing them to think that "weakness is a crime". TRY3 is then challenged by the Branch Manager himself. Unbeknownst to Team TRY3, the Branch Manager is doing this to obtain a special unit that was used against him in a card fight years ago.

During the battle at the United Sanctuary Branch, Chrono was given a blank card called a Depend Card by Kamui. After the battle at the United Sanctuary Chrono cardfights Kouji Ibuki and wins, the Depend Card transforms into a new unit, Chrono Dran, Kouji then reveals that there are 11 more Depend Cards, and someone is out to get all of them.

== Main characters ==
The main characters of the series are:

Chrono Shindou (新導 クロノ, Shindō Kurono)
Voiced by: Mark Ishii (Japanese); Sam Duke (English)

Birthday: September 9

Star Sign: Virgo

Blood Type: A

The main protagonist of the fifth series, "Cardfight!! Vanguard G". He is a lonely teenager who, like Kai, has a tough exterior but is a nice person. Before getting into Vanguard, he was anti-social and wasn't interested in much of anything. However, since getting into Vanguard, his personality underwent a refurbishment. In his debut, he is unfamiliar with the Cardfight!! Vanguard card game due to it not being available to him at the orphanage. His deck is composed of the unique Steampunk-themed Gear Chronicle clan, which he received from an anonymous person who is later revealed to be Kouji Ibuki. He uses Vanguard as a means to find something to be passionate about.

Tokoha Anjou (安城 トコハ, Anjō Tokoha)
Voiced by: Emi Nitta (G Season 1-3), (Japanese); Emma Duke (English)

Birthday: 17 April

Star Sign: Aries

Blood Type: O

Chrono's classmate and the younger sister of Mamoru. She is a strong Cardfighter but is often compared to her popular brother. She is an eighth grader in the same class as Chrono Shindou. She takes care in giving simple-to-understand lectures to beginners. As Mamoru Anjou's younger sister, she is burdened by the high expectations of others. Tokoha uses a Neo Nectar deck, with Asha as her main theme.

Shion Kiba (綺場 シオン, Kiba Shion)
Voiced by: Junya Enoki (Japanese); Cole Hanson (English)

Birthday: October 25

Star Sign: Scorpio

Blood Type: A

A popular and athletic schoolmate of Chrono's and a very skilled fencer from a high class. Shion sees himself as a rival to Chrono. As the heir to the Kiba family fortune, he was brought up to be a man befitting the upper class. One day, his fencing classmate lost a card, which Shion accidentally destroyed. During a trip to a card shop to buy a replacement, he noticed a Blue Sky Knight, Altmile on sale. This was the catalyst for Shion becoming a card-fighter. He has since been using a Royal Paladin deck, with Altmile as his main theme.

Kamui Katsuragi (葛木 カムイ, Katsuragi Kamui)
Voiced by: Shizuka Ishikawa (Japanese); Melissa Dorsey (English)

Birthday: September 13

Star Sign: Virgo

A youngster with a big mouth and the skill to back it up. He's very enthusiastic and energetic about Vanguard and doesn't care who his opponent is so long as they are not weak in his eyes. As a testament to his confidence, he will often refer to himself as "The Great Kamui" or "Kamui The Great" while card-fighting (In the Japanese version, Kamui says "ore-sama", which is an audacious way of refer to oneself). He works part-time in Card Capital 2, though he often leaves his post for various reasons, leaving Shin pretty frustrated sometimes. He helped to introduce Chrono Shindou to Vanguard. He serves as a mentor to Chrono Shindou, much like Shin Nitta was to Team Q4, and is responsible for the creation of Team TRY3. He takes a very special interest in Chrono not just because of his mysterious Gear Chronicle deck, but wants to help him grow as a cardfighter. Like in previous seasons, Kamui uses a Nova Grappler deck.

Kouji Ibuki (伊吹コウジ, Ibuki Kōji)
Voiced by: Mamoru Miyano (Japanese); Daegan Manns (English)
He is the employee of the United Sanctuary branch and Coach of Team Demise. Similar to Kai, he tends to add "the" on his move declarations. He works under the branch manager of United Sanctuary branch Yuichirou Kanzaki. He later betrayed the branch after finding out Kanzaki's ambition and entrusted Chrono with the Depend Card, believing that Chrono could use it. It is later revealed that he is the one who has been sending Gear Chronicle cards to Chrono. His deck consists of the Messiah theme of the Link Joker clan, having begun to use it following the events of Legion Mate.

== Antagonists ==
The antagonists of the series are:

Yuichirou Kanzaki (神崎 ユウイチロウ, Kanzaki Yūichirō)
Voiced by: Takehito Koyasu (Japanese); Josh Friesen (English)

The main antagonist of this season and the Branch Chief of United Sanctuary. He is an elitist who believes that "weakness is a crime" and teaches that philosophy to all fighters of the branch. After losing to Chrono, he retired as a branch chief of United Sanctuary. Kanzaki uses a Shadow Paladin deck, with Claret Sword Dragon as his main theme.

Shouma Shinonome (東雲 ショウマ, Shinonome Shōma)
Voiced by: Akira Ishida (Japanese); Mark Linde (English)

A calm and analytic fighter who defeated Shion in the regional tournament. Unlike Rin, Shouma prefers to make his opponents lose confidence. He was later fired from Team Demise after losing to Shion. Shouma uses a Genesis deck, with Fenrir as his main theme.

Rin Hashima (羽島リン, Hashima Rin)
Voiced by: Yui Kondo (Japanese); Caitlynne Medrek (English)

A popular card-fighter due to her strength and beauty, Rin is an arrogant, selfish, and sadistic fighter who uses psychological attacks to enrage or frighten her opponents. She bears a grudge against Mamoru due to a past incident and takes her hatred out on Tokoha. Rin defeated Tokoha at the regional tournament but lost to her at the special match afterwards, causing Rin to quit the team. Rin uses an Angel Feather deck, with Gavrail as her main theme.

Sugiru Kariya (刈谷 スギル, Kariya Sugiru)
Voiced by: Masahito Yabe (Japanese); Chris Austman (English)

An arrogant fighter who underestimates his opponents. He lost to Chrono in the regional tournament and was kicked out of Demise as a result. He uses a Link Joker deck, with Infinite as his main theme.

== Theme songs ==
Opening theme

- "Break It" by Mamoru Miyano (eps. 197–222) (eps. 197–244 in the English dub)
- "Generation!" by JAM Project (eps. 223–244)

Ending themes

- "Cheering On for You" (だから元気 for YOU, "Dakara Genki for You") by Misaki Tokura (Izumi Kitta) (eps. 197–209) (eps. 197–244 in the English dub)
- "NEXT PHASE" by Emi Nitta (eps. 210–222)
- "flower" by Ayako Nanakomori (eps. 223–232)
- "Dazzling Bravery!" (メクルメク勇気!, "Mekurumeku Yūki!") by Starmarie (eps. 233–244)

== Episode list ==
Individual episodes in G are known as "Turns".

No. overall	No. in series	Title	Directed by	Written by	Original release date
197	1	"Chrono Shindou"; Transliteration: "Shindō Kurono" (Japanese: 新導クロノ)	Kana Kawana	Kiyoko Yoshimura	October 26, 2014
Three years have passed after the end of the Legion Mate arc. Chrono Shindou, an independent and apathetic teenager, finds a Vanguard deck and a map in his school locker one day. After school, he follows the map to a card shop, Card Capital 2, where he sees his first cardfight between Mamoru Anjou and an older Kamui Katsuragi, who works part-time at the store. When Chrono shows Kamui his deck, Kamui is shocked that the deck is of a never-before-seen clan: Gear Chronicle. Kamui decides to have a cardfight with Chrono, who has never played Vanguard before. So, Kamui teaches Chrono about the lore and rules of Vanguard as they play. When Chrono is driven into a corner, he hears a voice that tells him about Generation Stride, or an "alternate future". This is an ability that allows Chrono to stride a new unit from the Generation Zone, and it manages to give him the victory over Kamui. Afterwards, having been emotionally moved by that cardfight, Chrono runs off to see his "alternate future" while passing by a certain someone...
198	2	"Kamui Katsuragi"; Transliteration: "Katsuragi Kamui" (Japanese: 葛木カムイ)	Jun Fukuta	Kiyoko Yoshimura	November 2, 2014
Chrono revisits Card Capital 2, meets Shin Nitta, and then talks with Kamui about his Gear Chronicle deck. Then, after meeting Team Trinity Dragon, Chrono is given a Fighter's Card ("Fica" for short) by Kamui, who also tells him about the Federation of International Vanguard Association (FIVA). It is an organization that supports Vanguard fighters, and through its Vanguard Network, it allows fighters to accept quests, gain points, and raise their grades. Accompanied by Kamui, Chrono and Team Trinity Dragon compete with each other in a quest from a young boy who wants them to find his lost card. They eventually discover the card was stolen by a crow and chase it down. Both Chrono and Tsuneto Tado, the leader of Team Trinity Dragon, grab the card but refuse to let the other take it. So, Kamui decides to have them settle things with a cardfight. After much teasing from Tsuneto about his name, Chrono defeats him, gives the card back to the boy, and completes the quest, thus gaining points and increasing his grade. Afterwards, Chrono and Kamui return to Card Capital 2, where Chrono has his first introduction to Misaki Tokura, who is now the owner of the Card Capital store line.
199	3	"Kouji Ibuki"; Transliteration: "Ibuki Kōji" (Japanese: 伊吹コウジ)	Toshio Kiuchi	Kenichi Yamada	November 9, 2014
Chrono takes on a quest from someone who wants to fight and test out a new deck. When Chrono goes to the specified meeting place, Vanguard Colosseum, he is greeted by a young man, Kouji Ibuki. He brings Chrono into a special room that is equipped with a Grand Image Reality System (GIRS), which is able to bring Vanguard fights to life through advanced holographic images. Chrono and Kouji engage in a cardfight with Chrono gaining the upper hand early. But Kouji soon reveals his sinister persona by toying with Chrono while exposing his weaknesses, comparing him to a child. Desperate to turn the fight around, Chrono attempts to stride Interdimensional Dragon, Mystery-flare Dragon. At the same time, Mystery-flare Dragon begins to appear in the real world, with only children being able to see it. However, the dragon disappears before it could fully emerge. Meanwhile, the GIRS shuts down, thus stopping Chrono and Kouji's fight. Kouji leaves without ever revealing his name to Chrono, who is left feeling completely frustrated.
200	4	"Shion Kiba"; Transliteration: "Kiba Shion" (Japanese: 綺場シオン)	Sumito Sasaki	Kazuhiko Inukai	November 16, 2014
At Card Capital 2, Chrono receives an envelope from an anonymous person that contains a new Gear Chronicle card. He then accepts a quest from a boy who wants to get a card back from his grandmother's house. Chrono meets the grandmother, Reika, and attempts to explain the situation to her, but she does not trust him. To earn her trust while also improving himself, Chrono does menial tasks for Reika such as pulling weeds from her yard and buying her groceries. When Chrono returns from shopping, he is shocked to see that Shion Kiba, a popular and athletic student/cardfighter from his school, has already acquired the requested card and also earned Reika's trust (and affection). Since Chrono was there first, Shion feels that he should have the card and tries to give it to him. However, Chrono declines, thinking Shion is pitying him. Returning to the card shop, Chrono and Shion decide to resolve things with a cardfight, with the winner ultimately getting the card to fulfill the quest. Driven into a corner by Shion's Royal Paladin deck, Chrono manages to make a comeback victory with the new Gear Chronicle card he got. Although Shion gracefully accepts his loss, he vows to defeat Chrono when they fight next time.
201	5	"Tokoha Anjou"; Transliteration: "Anjō Tokoha" (Japanese: 安城トコハ)	Yoshito Hata	Kakuzō Nanmanji	November 23, 2014
Tokoha Anjou is a female classmate of Chrono's and is skilled in Vanguard. One day, she is asked by her older brother Mamoru, a famous pro fighter, to tell him about any information she finds about the new Gear Chronicle clan. The next day, Tokoha takes her friend Kumi Okazaki to Card Capital 2 and gets her registered as an official Vanguard fighter. They then see Chrono playing Vanguard, with Tokoha surprised to see Chrono being happy when compared to his delinquent-like nature at school. Chrono accidentally drops his deck due to suffering from a toothache, which allows Tokoha to see that he has the Gear Chronicle clan that Mamoru told her about. Later, afraid to go to the dentist, Chrono tries to take his mind off his toothache by taking on an easy quest at the card shop. He accepts a quest from a beginner who wants to fight; the person who made the request turns out to be Tokoha's friend Kumi. Chrono and Kumi engage in their cardfight, but his toothache causes him to make mistakes and puts himself at a disadvantage against Kumi's Oracle Think Tank deck. When Tokoha reminds Chrono that Vanguard fights should be fun, he makes a recovery and wins the fight. Before Chrono could leave, Tokoha tells him that she will eventually fight him. In the end, Tokoha informs Mamoru about Chrono, who finally goes to the dentist to treat his toothache.
202	6	"Mamoru Anjou"; Transliteration: "Anjō Mamoru" (Japanese: 安城マモル)	Ryōsuke Senbo	Miya Asakawa	November 30, 2014
Kamui invites Chrono to a special FIVA event where one lucky person can get a chance to fight against Mamoru, who is the Kagero clan leader of the region. After Chrono registers himself for the event, he is approached by a man in a costume of FIVA's mascot character, Vangua-rou, who is interested in fighting against Chrono's Gear Chronicle deck. Then, Mamoru appears, trying to find the branch manager, Ryutarou Oyama. He quickly deduces that "Vangua-rou" is Ryutarou, who escapes with Chrono in hand. To track Ryutarou down, Mamoru creates a quest for all fighters to "catch Vangua-rou", thus leading Ryutarou and a reluctant Chrono to be chased by several people. They find shelter in a secret room where Ryutarou discards his Vangua-rou costume and reveals his true appearance. Chrono and Ryutarou have their cardfight in another room equipped with GIRS. Before the battle could conclude, Mamoru shows up, after finishing the event in which he fought a randomly-selected attendee (Tsuneto), and chastises Ryutarou. Chrono and Mamoru finally meet and get acquainted with each other; Mamoru requests to fight Chrono, but he declines because he wishes to get stronger first.
203	7	"Shion's Pride"; Transliteration: "Shion no Hokori" (Japanese: シオンの誇り)	Kana Kawana	Miya Asakawa	December 7, 2014
Tokoha invites Chrono and Shion to a special Vanguard quiz competition event, which is split into three phases. Shion easily wins the first phase, a game in which players are given a picture of a card and must buzz in and call the card's right name as fast as possible. In the second phase, a scavenger hunt, Chrono wins due to Shion prioritizing to help an injured boy. The boy has a pessimistic attitude, but Shion tries to cheer him up by vowing to win the entire event. In the third and final phase, Chrono and Shion race through an obstacle course. Despite some mistakes and with some unexpected help from Chrono, Shion barely manages to reach the goal and win the event, thus fulfilling his promise to the boy.
204	8	"Beautiful Nagisa"; Transliteration: "Uruwashi no Nagisa" (Japanese: 麗しのナギサ)	Jun Fukuta	Kazuhiko Inukai	December 14, 2014
Chrono meets a girl who Kamui is all too familiar with: Nagisa Daimonji. She may have matured, but her romantic feelings for Kamui have stayed strong over the years. She has even gone so far as to make a quest for fighters (Team Trinity Dragon) to get Kamui to play against her. Kamui tries his best to escape, but he is eventually cornered by Nagisa and Trinity Dragon. Chrono appears in Kamui's defense after accepting his quickly-made quest to protect him from Nagisa. However, Chrono is deceived by Nagisa's (false) "tragic love story" and sides with her while Kamui manages to enlist Trinity Dragon to his aid. After this whole debacle, Kamui finally decides to fight Nagisa. If he wins, then Nagisa will leave him alone at the shop. But if Nagisa wins, then she and Kamui will get married. Despite Nagisa's luck in getting triggers, Kamui manages to defeat her, although she will most likely return.
205	9	"Tokoha's Treasure Box / Tokoha's Treasure Chest"; Transliteration: "Tokoha no Takarabako" (Japanese: トコハの宝箱)	Toshio Kiuchi	Kakuzō Nanmanji	December 21, 2014
While working with Chrono in setting up for a Vanguard tournament for children, Tokoha reunites with a woman named Akane Kiyosu. The two have known each other since their youth and have a sister-like bond, but they have grown distant as time passed. One day, when they were young, Tokoha and Akane buried a time capsule in a park; they both put one present into the capsule that they kept secret from each other to this day. When Tokoha sees that the same park is now undergoing construction, she learns that Chrono had dug up the capsule as part of a quest from Akane, who then takes that capsule. Tokoha later learns and is distraught from the news that Akane has taken a post overseas and will be leaving Japan tomorrow. The next day, during the children's Vanguard tournament, Tokoha resolves to see Akane at the airport and have one more cardfight with her as a farewell gift. As they both recall their memories from the past, Akane reassures Tokoha that her departure is not the end but rather a new beginning. After Tokoha wins the fight, Akane gives her the present that she placed in the time capsule: a gold medal. Akane then leaves, and while on the plane, she opens the gift that Tokoha had left in the capsule: a special card of herself drawn by a young Tokoha.
206	10	"Jaime Alcaraz"; Transliteration: "Haime Arukarasu" (Japanese: ハイメ・アルカラス)	Yoshito Hata	Kenichi Yamada	December 28, 2014
Chrono takes on a quest from a foreigner who wants him to show how Vanguard is played in Japan. At the rendezvous point, Chrono meets the client, a young Spanish man named Jaime Alcaraz. Despite what the quest said, the overly-positive Jaime is more interested in sightseeing and learning about Japanese culture than playing Vanguard. After much shopping, sidetracks, and run-ins with Shion and Tokoha, Chrono and Jaime overhear two children arguing; one little boy wants to have a cardfight with the other older boy, who refuses him. Jaime persuades that boy into fighting by offering him the delicacies he bought throughout the day. So, the two boys fight, and the younger boy manages to win. Afterwards, the two kids become friends, and Jaime decides to give all of his food with both of them. Just when Jaime finally wants to play Vanguard with Chrono, Mamoru appears and reveals Jaime's real identity; he is a rising star fighter from the European League and has been invited to Japan to compete as part of the Euro team in an interleague match against the Tokyo team (which Mamoru is a member of). In the end, Jaime recommends for Chrono to watch the match and then takes his leave with Mamoru.
207	11	"Jaime's Card"; Transliteration: "Haime no Kādo" (Japanese: ハイメのカード)	Shūji Miyahara	Kiyoko Yoshimura	January 11, 2015
Chrono and his friends watch Jaime fight and subsequently defeat Mamoru in the interleague match. A day later, feeling anxious after watching that battle, Chrono tries to accept a quest that would award him with enough points to increase his grade. However, he ends up foregoing the quest in order to help a lost Jaime. Together, they travel to the orphanage where Jaime was raised as a child. Once there, Jaime plays with the orphans while Chrono converses with the owner Emilio. Afterwards, while walking home, Jaime shows Chrono his most treasured card, which was given to him by Emilio. The card flies out of his hand, and Jaime manages to save it but then falls into a river. So, Chrono takes Jaime to his home where he washes and cleans himself. To repay Chrono, Jaime decides to make a special quest for him, in which Chrono and Jaime will fight each other tomorrow. If Chrono wins, then he will gain the points needed to level up his grade.
208	12	"Chrono vs. Jaime"; Transliteration: "Kurono VS Haime" (Japanese: クロノVSハイメ)	Ryōsuke Senbo	Kiyoko Yoshimura	January 18, 2015
Chrono and Jaime have their cardfight as their friends (including Kouji, secretly) watch the match unfold. Jaime does the same Aqua Force combo he used to defeat Mamoru, but Chrono retaliates by striding Chronoscommand Dragon and then sending Jaime's rear-guards back into his deck. However, Jaime calls more rear-guards and continues his unrelenting assault on Chrono. In a last-ditch effort, Chrono strides Mystery-flare Dragon and activates its risky skill; by revealing the top four cards of his deck after a successful attack, if all those cards are of different grades, then Chrono gets another turn. He manages to get the right cards and ultimately wins the fight with his additional turn. This victory means that Chrono has fulfilled Jaime's quest and thus is awarded enough points to increase his grade. Finally, Jaime takes a flight back home and bids "adios" to Chrono.
209	13	"A Night at Card Capital / Night at Card Capital"; Transliteration: "Kādo Kyapitaru No Yoru" (Japanese: カードキャピタルの夜)	Katsuhiko Bizen	Kazuhiko Inukai	January 25, 2015
To celebrate Chrono's ascension to grade 2, Kamui, Team Trinity Dragon, and Shin throw a surprise party for him at the shop. After inviting Tokoha, Kumi, and Shion, everybody enjoys eating stew, playing table tennis, going out for ice cream, and playing in the park, except for Shin who fears Misaki's reaction to having a party in the store. After Kamui tells Chrono about the benefits that await him at grade 3, the group is motivated to play Vanguard for the rest of the night. Later, while Kamui and the others sleep, Chrono and Tokoha draw funny pictures on their faces and coax Shion to join them. The next morning, Misaki arrives and wakes up everyone, who have all had their faces drawn on. In contrast to Shin's worries, Misaki is happy after noticing how much fun everyone had.
210	14	"The Wanderer, Takeru / Takeru the Wanderer"; Transliteration: "Fūraibō Takeru" (Japanese: 風来坊・タケル)	Kana Kawana	Kenichi Yamada	February 1, 2015
After receiving another new Gear Chronicle card from an anonymous person, Chrono comes across and helps a young man named Takeru Baba who collapses from hunger. He is a Vanguard fighter who has been traveling across the country and constantly training to become stronger. Takeru offers to repay Chrono, who declines. However, insistent in wishing to repay him, Takeru follows Chrono around but faints from hunger again. Chrono takes him to a nearby card shop where Takeru refills his stomach and Chrono spots Shion fighting other players. Finishing his meal, Takeru comments that he had fought Shion before and noticed that a certain encounter has changed him. After Takeru explains his belief that every meeting has meaning, Chrono decides to fight him. The two have such an intense cardfight that it attracts all of the other players' attentions away from Shion's battles. In the end, Chrono wins, and he and Takeru swear to meet again in the local qualifiers of the upcoming Vanguard National Tournament.
211	15	"Ghost Disguise / The Masked Ghost"; Transliteration: "Kamen Gōsuto" (Japanese: 仮面ゴースト)	Yoshito Hata	Kazuhiko Inukai	February 8, 2015
After attending a party and getting reacquainted with an old friend, Yuya Karasumori, Shion overhears rumors about the Masked Ghost, a mysterious fighter who has been challenging other players and taking their avatar cards. One day, after he and Yuya spar in a fencing match, Shion is told that he will get special training from a professional fencing representative in a few days. Later, Shion receives a tip from Ryota, the boy who he befriended at the Vanguard Quiz Competition, that the Masked Ghost has been spotted. Shion tries to confront the Ghost, but he escapes. Some time later, after hearing more info about the Ghost from Ryota, Shion awaits training from the fencing representative. Just as Shion realizes the true identity of the Ghost, he receives a message that tells him that Ryota is fighting the Ghost at a warehouse and rushes over there. He arrives soon after Ryota loses to the Ghost and has his avatar card taken. Shion challenges the Ghost, who enforces a unique condition to their cardfight; Shion must play with 12 triggers taken out of his deck, but if Shion wins, then the Ghost will return all of the stolen cards. Shortly into the battle, Shion exposes the Masked Ghost's real identity: Yuya, who reveals his true motives to why he has been doing this. Nonetheless, despite the large handicap, Shion defeats Yuya, who runs away after leaving all of the stolen cards. In the end, Shion loses his chance to receive professional fencing training, but he has no regrets and believes he will get another chance.
212	16	"Clan Leader Mamoru"; Transliteration: "Kuran Rīdā Mamoru" (Japanese: クランリーダー・マモル)	Jun Fukuta; Keisuke Inoue	Miya Asakawa	February 15, 2015
Tokoha gathers Chrono and the rest of the gang for a meeting to brainstorm ideas on what they can do for an upcoming regional Vanguard festival. When Chrono suggests a takoyaki stand, everyone agrees to do it. The festival eventually begins, and the takoyaki stand turns out to be a success. The others let Chrono, who has surprisingly been working hard this whole time, go enjoy the festival for himself. In the midst of the festivities, Chrono sees Mamoru hard at work himself, doing tasks such as helping attendees, advertising other booths, and cosplaying as Vangua-rou. Chrono asks why a famous fighter like Mamoru would have festivals and do grunt work when there can instead be tournaments. Mamoru responds that festivals are great in gathering people together and teaching them about Vanguard, which he feels is more important than tournaments. The festival's main event starts, in which players line up, form a group of three, and then simultaneously battle against Mamoru before the next group steps up to fight him. As reward for their work, Chrono and his friends are given special privilege to participate in this event, except Tokoha, who opts out of it. However, Kumi gets an emergency call and rushes back home while requesting Tokoha to take her place. Subsequently, it is time for the trio of Chrono, Shion, and a reluctant Tokoha to fight Mamoru. Nonetheless, like the other fighters before them, they are defeated but given a round of applause from the audience for their efforts. As the festival comes to a close, Chrono and Shion are glad to have fought Mamoru despite losing, and Tokoha invites them to folk dancing around a campfire.
213	17	"Chrono vs. Tokoha"; Transliteration: "Kurono VS Tokoha" (Japanese: クロノVSトコハ)	Toshio Kiuchi	Kiyoko Yoshimura	February 22, 2015
Tokoha puts on a smiling face, but she has grown frustrated and despondent by people referring her as "Mamoru's little sister", having high expectations of her for being related to a pro cardfighter, and not seeing her as an individual. She has also refrained herself from entering competitive tournaments as a result. After finishing a quest with Kumi, Tokoha tries to cheer herself up by getting her favorite croquette bread, but Chrono buys the last batch. So, she challenges him to a fight with the winner acquiring the bread. Chrono inadvertently irks Tokoha when he mentions she is Mamoru's little sister, which causes her to get angry and make a crucial mistake in the battle. He apologizes and explains what he really meant was that he acknowledges Tokoha as a strong fighter like her brother. Despite Chrono winning, he decides to give the bread to Tokoha, who now feels more confident in herself.
214	18	"Vortex Cupid"; Transliteration: "Uzumaki Kyūpiddo" (Japanese: うずまきキューピッド)	Kazuomi Koga	Ayumu Hisao	March 1, 2015
One day, a socially awkward teenager named Ogawa had a cardfight with a girl who he fell in love with at first sight. Unfortunately, the girl accidentally left behind an Angel Feather card (Battle Cupid, Nociel), and having never learned her name, Ogawa has not been able to find her or give the card back to her. One month later, he eventually makes a quest that Chrono, Shion, and Tokoha accept to locate that girl and return her card. With little information to go on, the trio nonetheless searches for her. After much investigation, they eventually track the girl, Hinako, at her school. Shion and Tokoha feel that Ogawa should personally give her card back, but he is too scared to see her. Then, Chrono decides to shuffle the card amongst four others and has Ogawa draw one of them. If Ogawa picks the Nociel card, then he will be the one to return the card, but if not, then Chrono will. Ogawa gathers his courage, draws the right card, and returns it to her. For completing this quest, Chrono, Shion, and Tokoha are given an equal number of points. Afterwards, Shion and Tokoha suspect that Chrono had shuffled the Nociel card amongst other copies of it so that Ogawa would pick it no matter what. To their surprise and disappointment, Chrono reveals that he did not do so.
215	19	"The Power of Bonds! X-tiger"; Transliteration: "Kizuna no Chikara! Ekusutaigā" (Japanese: 絆の力！エクスタイガー)	Ryōsuke Senbo	Kakuzō Nanmanji	March 8, 2015
Kamui gives Chrono and Tokoha each a DVD movie starring Team Caesar for them to watch. In the film, Kenji, Yuri, and Gai are members of Earth Defense Squad Caesar; they pilot their own giant robots and protect the world from alien monsters. They seemingly destroy one named Zeal, but when they return to the scene, Gai sees that Zeal has shrunk itself and tries to shoot it but catches Yuri in the crossfire. Zeal takes slight control over Yuri's mech and attacks Gai, causing further mistrust. It is then that Zeal appears as an evolved form, attacks the team, and changes into its final form. To retaliate, Team Caesar combines each of their robots into Great Daikaiser. Gai wants to go for the finishing blow quickly, but Yuri tries to stop him for fear of collateral damage to the city. Their infighting causes a misfire that grazes Zeal which escapes. Frustrated, Gai leaves the team. Later, after discovering that Zeal was what caused Yuri's robot to attack Gai earlier, Zeal appears once more. With Gai gone, Kenji and Yuri attempt to stop it by themselves. They are almost defeated until the timely arrival of Gai. After the team reconciles, they combine into Great Daikaiser again and chase Zeal into outer space, where the team is surrounded and assaulted by a Legion of Zeals. Although heavily damaged, Caesar remains undaunted. Suddenly, the legendary robot Super Cosmic Hero, X-tiger appears before them. With its aid, Team Caesar wipes out the Legion of Zeals, thus saving the Earth. Although Tokoha did not like the movie, Chrono however loved it and becomes ecstatic when he meets the actual Team Caesar at the card shop.
216	20	"Still Unnamed"; Transliteration: "Mada Nai Namae" (Japanese: まだない名前)	Yoshito Hata	Kazuhiko Inukai	March 15, 2015
For the upcoming regional Vanguard tournament, Kamui decides to have Chrono, Tokoha, and Shion form an unlikely team together. He tests their teamwork through a variety of exercises, but the trio exhibits no sign of team harmony whatsoever. Then, Kamui has the three play against Team Trinity Dragon in a special cardfight in which each team member will switch with another after each turn. Throughout the fight, Chrono, Tokoha, and Shion constantly argue with each other about their playing methods. With excellent synergy, Trinity Dragon wins, leaving Kamui to believe that there is no hope for Chrono's team. Desperate to prove Kamui wrong (although he was really faking it), Chrono, Tokoha, and Shion become determined to make their unnamed team successful.
217	21	"Fake Fight"; Transliteration: "Itsuwari no Faito" (Japanese: 偽りのファイト)	Katsuhiko Bizen	Kiyoko Yoshimura	March 22, 2015
Chrono, Tokoha, and Shion enter a team tournament in which the winner will gain enough points to ascend to grade 3. Things go swimmingly for them until Chrono spots one member of Team Trick Trick cheating and tries to call them out on it. However, Trick Trick's leader fakes getting hurt by Chrono and interrupts another cardfight in progress. Believing that Chrono resorted to violence, a judge tells him that he is to be stripped of his grade and banned from the tournament. After Chrono angrily leaves, Shion manages to expose Team Trick Trick's cheating methods. Ultimately, in a FIVA meeting led by Kouji, it is decided that Trick Trick will be banned from entering official tournaments for five years, and Chrono is penalized by losing all of his fighter points.
218	22	"Messiah"; Transliteration: "Mesaia" (Japanese: メサイア)	Masahiro Sonoda	Kenichi Yamada	March 29, 2015
After the incident at the team tournament, Chrono decides to leave his deck at the card shop and quit playing Vanguard, despite encouragement from his friends. However, after passing by many children happily engaging in Vanguard, Chrono rushes back to the shop, only to see Kouji there with the deck in his hands. Kouji reveals that he had previously met someone who had used the Gear Chronicle deck and notes its special power. Not wanting Kouji to have the deck, Chrono challenges him to a fight with the winner getting the deck. As he battles Kouji's Link Joker Messiah deck, Chrono realizes that while his fighter points are gone, the fond memories he has with his friends through Vanguard are still with him. Nevertheless, Kouji wins the fight, who decides to leave Chrono with the deck.
219	23	"The Dark Ones"; Transliteration: "Dāku wa Yatsura" (Japanese: ダークな奴ら)	Shingo Okano	Miya Asakawa	April 5, 2015
After Chrono makes amends with Tokoha and Shion, the three take on a quest that will award Chrono enough points to return to grade 2. In this quest, the trio faces unusual challenges such as standing on top of a stack of pillows, cosplaying, and traversing a maze. They eventually reach the end where Chrono engages in a cardfight with the quest giver, an eccentric man referring to himself as "Vlad III". After winning a long hard-fought battle against Vlad's Dark Irregulars deck, Chrono gains not only the points to reach grade 2 but also the title of "Vlad IV" (much to Chrono's disapproval).
220	24	"Kouji vs. Mamoru / Ibuki vs. Mamoru"; Transliteration: "Ibuki VS Mamoru" (Japanese: 伊吹VSマモル)	Toshio Kiuchi	Kazuhiko Inukai	April 12, 2015
Mamoru invites Kouji for dinner where they play a game of Vanguard while discussing about Chrono, the incident at the team tournament, and their different beliefs in Vanguard; Mamoru believes in having fun while Kouji is more focused on winning. Meanwhile, with only a week until the regional tournament's entry deadline, Tokoha and Shion help Chrono complete as many quests as possible to gain the necessary number of points to reach grade 3. However, Chrono ends up missing out on a lot of quests in order to help a young lost boy. All hope seems lost until Mamoru, knowing Chrono's circumstances, creates a special quest, which Chrono, Tokoha, and Shion immediately accept, that will award enough points for Chrono to level up to grade 3.
221	25	"Birth of a Team"; Transliteration: "Chīmu Tanjō" (Japanese: チーム誕生)	Yoshito Hata	Ayumu Hisao	April 19, 2015
The special quest that Chrono, Tokoha, Shion, and many other fighters are participating in is a survival game/scavenger hunt on a mountain. Teams must find star coins scattered across the mountain, pass obstacles, and bet the coins in cardfights against other teams. Upon reaching the goal line, the coins will then be converted into points towards a fighter's grade. As Chrono, Tokoha, and Shion fight and gain coins, they come across many of their friends and have a fun time together. Near the finish line, Chrono defeats Tsuneto and acquires all of his coins, thus giving Chrono enough points to reach grade 3. Now eligible to enter the regional tournament with Tokoha and Shion, Chrono officially names their team "TRY3".
222	26	"Taiyou Asukawa"; Transliteration: "Asukawa Taiyou" (Japanese: 明日川タイヨウ)	Jun Hatori	Kiyoko Yoshimura	April 26, 2015
Shin has Chrono teach a young shy boy named Taiyou Asukawa on how to play Vanguard. In the midst of the teaching fight, Taiyou explains how lonely and depressed he felt before getting into Vanguard, which Chrono can relate to. Although Chrono wins, Taiyou nonetheless feels more confident in himself, and Shin is inspired to play Vanguard again.
223	27	"Yuichirou Kanzaki"; Transliteration: "Kanzaki Yūichirō" (Japanese: 神崎ユウイチロウ)	Ryōsuke Senbo	Kazuhiko Inukai	May 3, 2015
After much preparation by Team TRY3, the regional tournament finally begins. It opens with an exhibition match between last year's national champion Toyoyama and Yuichirou Kanzaki, the director of the United Sanctuary region and the man in charge of this tournament. Toyoyama seemingly has the upper hand until Kanzaki brutally retaliates and finishes the match. After Kanzaki gives a speech of elitism, the regional tournament starts as Team TRY3 makes it past the first round.
224	28	"Again, The Wanderer"; Transliteration: "Fūraibō, Futatabi" (Japanese: 風来坊、再び)	Katsuhiko Bizen	Kazuhiko Inukai	May 10, 2015
TRY3's opponent in the second round is Team Wanderers led by Takeru Baba, which leads to a rematch between him and Chrono. As they have another intense cardfight, Chrono learns that Takeru fights for the sake of his sickly younger brother Hayato, which causes him to falter. But with some encouragement from Tokoha, Chrono regains his fighting spirit and wins the battle, thus advancing TRY3 to the third round.
225	29	"Team Demise"; Transliteration: "Chīmu Dimaizu" (Japanese: チーム・ディマイズ)	Yukio Kuroda	Ayumu Hisao	May 17, 2015
TRY3 makes it past the qualifying rounds into the top 16 of the tournament. Their upcoming opponent is Team Demise, which is coached by Kouji. While Chrono faces off against Demise's Sugiru Kariya, Shion reminisces about the time when he first got into playing Vanguard. In spite of Kariya's expert and ruthless plays, Chrono pulls off a comeback and wins the game.
226	30	"Rin Hashima"; Transliteration: "Hashima Rin" (Japanese: 羽島リン)	Yoshito Hata	Miya Asakawa	May 24, 2015
While Kamui fights Kouji to determine his intentions, Tokoha battles against Team Demise's Rin Hashima, a girl with a sadistic personality and a grudge against Mamoru. Throughout the cardfight, Rin taunts Tokoha by bringing up Mamoru into the conversation before finally defeating her. As Shion prepares himself for his next fight, Tokoha is left feeling depressed.
227	31	"Shouma Shinonome"; Transliteration: "Shinonome Shōma" (Japanese: 東雲ショウマ)	Eiichi Kuboyama	Kiyoko Yoshimura	May 31, 2015
While Tokoha's friends cheer her up after her loss to Rin, Shion tries to gain details about his upcoming opponent: Team Demise's Shouma Shinonome. However, he has an accidental encounter with Shouma himself, which leaves Shion with no time to look up any more information about him. Then, the decisive cardfight between Shion and Shouma commences. Although acting gentlemanly and knowing Shion's background, Shouma questions whether or not Shion is taking Vanguard seriously, causing him to slightly waver. Even though Shouma efficiently blocks most of Shion's attacks, Shion gets a chance to win the match but fails to do so. In the end, Shouma wins, meaning that Team Demise advances through the regional tournament and TRY3 is eliminated. Elsewhere, Kouji reports to Kanzaki about Chrono...
228	32	"Beginning of a Long Summer"; Transliteration: "Nagai Natsu no Hajimari" (Japanese: 長い夏の始まり)	Junichirō Hashiguchi	Kenichi Yamada	June 7, 2015
To cheer up the depressed pair of Tokoha and Shion, and to repay them for helping him return to grade 3, Chrono prepares a trip to a beach with amusing activities planned for the day. Unfortunately, the bad weather and other accidents ruin most of the fun that the three hoped to have. Chrono eventually reveals that he originally wanted to show a once-in-a-lifetime meteor shower to Tokoha and Shion. After he reassures Tokoha and Shion of their abilities, Team TRY3 is then treated with a fireworks display from a nearby festival. But later, Shion declares to his teammates that he will be quitting Vanguard.
229	33	"Chrono vs. Shion"; Transliteration: "Kurono VS Shion" (Japanese: クロノVSシオン)	Jun Hatori	Kazuhiko Inukai	June 14, 2015
Chrono and Tokoha attempt to convince Shion to continue playing Vanguard. However, being a member of the prestigious Kiba family, Shion claims that he has other duties to tend nor does he want to play Vanguard with half-serious feelings as he has already been doing. So, with help from the Kiba family butler Iwakura, Chrono sneaks into Shion's home where he challenges him to a cardfight. As they battle, Chrono accuses Shion of running away from the fact that he lost to Shouma. Remembering to believe in his own possibilities, Shion manages to attain his long-awaited victory over Chrono. In the end, Shion decides to continue playing Vanguard and rejoin Team TRY3.
230	34	"Magallanica's Mermaid Princess"; Transliteration: "Megaranika no Ningyo Hime" (Japanese: メガラニカの人魚姫)	Ryōsuke Senbo	Daisuke Ishibashi	June 21, 2015
TRY3 attends a special concert featuring Saya Yatomi, a popular idol from the Magallanica region and daughter of a former idol, Hitomi Kouzouji. They reluctantly become part of the event staff, and Tokoha finds herself fulfilling Saya's diva-like demands. Nonetheless, Tokoha realizes that she and Saya are alike in that they both want to be recognized as individuals and stop living in their idolized relatives' shadows. After a last-minute stage show in which Tokoha and Saya get in a pie fight, the two have a cardfight to settle the score. Then, when Chrono arrives home, he is told by his aunt Mikuru Shindou to stop playing Vanguard...
231	35	"Shin Nitta"; Transliteration: "Nitta Shin" (Japanese: 新田シン)	Yūsuke Onoda	Ayumu Hisao	June 28, 2015
After learning from Mikuru that his father was a cardfighter and died because of Vanguard, Chrono feels lost on what he should do. He tries to talk to Shin about it but decides not to. Sensing Chrono is troubled over something, Shin proposes to have a fight with him as a way to find the answer for himself. Shin shows that despite his appearance, he is a highly skilled fighter as he counters Chrono's tactics with his Murakumo deck. At the end of this fierce battle, Chrono manages to win on a gamble. Afterwards, Shin deduces that Chrono was asked by a family member to stop playing Vanguard, and Chrono realizes that he loves the game so much that he cannot quit. So, Chrono eventually confronts Mikuru and tells her his true feelings about Vanguard. Revealed to be acquainted with Shin and hearing from him about how much Vanguard changed Chrono's life, Mikuru now understands Chrono's feelings and allows him to continue playing the game.
232	36	"United Sanctuary"; Transliteration: "Yunaiteddo Sankuchuari" (Japanese: ユナイテッド・サンクチュアリ)	Yoshito Hata	Kazuhiko Inukai	July 5, 2015
Team TRY3 participates in a tournament held at the United Sanctuary branch. The top three fighters will earn not only the right to be part of the branch's special selection but also the chance to fight against Team Demise. As the tournament progresses, TRY3 notices the peculiar behavior and "winning is everything" mentality of the United Sanctuary branch's fighters. In the final round, Chrono faces a familiar friend: Taiyou Asukawa, who has drastically changed from his former timid soft-spoken self. Unbeknownst to Chrono, Taiyou was subjected to a special strengthening program in which he fought against Chrono's Gear Chronicle deck in simulations, thus turning him into a cold calculating fighter. In spite of Taiyou predicting and countering Chrono's every move, Chrono turns the fight around in his favor and wins. After Taiyou is taken away by a security guard who suspiciously looks like Yuya Karasumori, TRY3 is appointed the winner of the tournament. However, the team feels that something is amiss...
233	37	"Dog Trainer"; Transliteration: "Doggu Torēnā" (Japanese: ドッグトレーナー)	Katsuhiko Bizen	Kazuhiko Inukai	July 12, 2015
Using the special bracelets awarded to them for winning the tournament, TRY3 infiltrates the United Sanctuary branch. However, a security guard mistakes them as native fighters and separates the trio. Tokoha is horrified by the harsh training programs of the branch and decides to confront Rin about it. Elsewhere, Shion is taken to a GIRS arena where he is challenged to a cardfight by that guard who is in fact Yuya as Shion had suspected. While battling against Yuya's new Shadow Paladin deck, Shion is forced to wear the bracelet which delivers physical pain to him whenever he takes damage. When Shouma appears to spectate the match, Yuya reveals how it was Shouma who invited him to the branch. Yuya eventually rose up the ranks and gained the position of Dog Trainer, a security personnel/disciplinary teacher who punishes losers and enforces the branch's mottoes of "winning is everything" and "weakness is a sin" to others. Offended and outraged upon hearing of the branch's morals, Shion swiftly defeats Yuya and then confronts Shouma. Meanwhile, Chrono meets with Taiyou again and tries to convince him that his current mentality of wanting to become strong is not right. As Chrono attempts to flee from the facility with Taiyou, Kouji stands before him.
234	38	"Miracle Card"; Transliteration: "Kiseki no Kādo" (Japanese: 奇跡のカード)	Toshio Kiuchi	Kiyoko Yoshimura	July 19, 2015
After Team TRY3 is reunited, Kouji informs the trio about how the United Sanctuary Branch uses their harsh training programs to strengthen cardfighters and how these people are participating in them of their own volition. With TRY3 still believing the branch's ways are wrong, Kanzaki decides to fight the team by himself. As Kanzaki makes his counterarguments to TRY3, he reveals that a certain fight he had was what influenced him into becoming the elitist he is today. After mentioning something about a "miracle card" that he encountered, Kanzaki defeats TRY3. Later, it is revealed that Kanzaki's true goal is using the branch's training programs to fulfill the conditions of making that miracle card appear before him again and then claim it.
235	39	"Solar Eclipse"; Transliteration: "Nisshoku" (Japanese: 日蝕)	Masahiro Sonoda	Ayumu Hisao	August 2, 2015
Jaime returns to Japan and gives Chrono a new Gear Chronicle card. Then, Chrono gets an idea to bring Taiyou along with his friends for a day of fun in an effort to have Taiyou smile again. Near the end of the day, Doujima, a top-ranked Dog Trainer from the United Sanctuary branch, appears to take Taiyou back. Chrono decides to fight Doujima, using the new Gear Chronicle card, Chronodragon Nextage, to win the long and difficult battle. However, Taiyou still feels the need to become stronger and returns to the branch with Doujima. Although Chrono failed to change Taiyou's perspective, he stays determined to show him how fun Vanguard can be. But unbeknownst to Chrono, Taiyou is selected to undergo a special training program...
236	40	"Nextage"; Transliteration: "Nekusutēji" (Japanese: ネクステージ)	Yoshito Hata	Kenichi Yamada	August 9, 2015
TRY3 finally receives the invitation to the promised match against Team Demise. At the same time, Ryutarou plans to hold an assembly to discuss with all the other chiefs about the United Sanctuary's harsh training programs. Believing the special match is a chance to show the fun of Vanguard to the fighters of the United Sanctuary branch, Team TRY3 attempts to convince Ryutarou to hold off on the assembly until afterwards. This leads to a cardfight between Chrono and Ryutarou, with Chrono successfully conveying his honest feelings of wanting to display how fun Vanguard can be. After the fight, Ryutarou explains that the assembly will still be held but after the special match. Until then, TRY3 individually train themselves for the upcoming match, with Shion and Tokoha gaining new cards for their efforts. Finally, the day of the special match arrives...
237	41	"Tokoha vs. Rin"; Transliteration: "Tokoha VS Rin" (Japanese: トコハVSリン)	Yukio Kuroda	Miya Asakawa	August 16, 2015
Following Taiyou being revealed as the newest member of Team Demise, the first game of the special match between TRY3 and Demise begins with Tokoha facing off against Rin. Like the last time they fought, Rin tries to taunt and irritate Tokoha. However, Tokoha instead remains calm and has fun with the battle, which infuriates Rin. After realizing how much Rin is stuck up on Mamoru, Tokoha wins the fight with her new G unit Dream-spinning Ranunculus, Ahsha. Soon afterwards, a disgusted Rin quits Team Demise, and the special match moves on to the next game, which will be between Shion and Shouma.
238	42	"Shion vs. Shouma"; Transliteration: "Shion VS Shōma" (Japanese: シオンVSショウマ)	Jun Hatori	Kazuhiko Inukai	August 23, 2015
The rematch between Shion and Shouma commences. While making strong offensive and defensive plays, Shouma thinks that Shion is still the prideful person who tries to do everything but ends up with mediocre results. Because of this, Shouma predicts this fight will end the same way as the last time they battled. However, Shion believes his possibilities are endless as he strides his new G unit Aerial Divine Knight, Altmile to turn Shouma's prediction on its head and make a comeback victory.
239	43	"Depend Card / Stride Force"; Transliteration: "Sutoraido Fōsu" (Japanese: ストライドフォース)	Toshihiro Maeya	Kiyoko Yoshimura	August 30, 2015
During an intermission, Team TRY3 and Kamui sneak into the headquarters of the United Sanctuary branch. They are eventually caught and brought in front of Kanzaki, who reveals his true ambitions. Kanzaki has been using the branch to set up harsh regimens to train fighters who would wear special bracelets, which transfers a unique energy called "Stride Force". The gathered energy was supposed to be used to awaken the previously-mentioned miracle card, dubbed the "Depend Card", but Kouji had stolen it and escaped during the special match. After Kanzaki releases the group, Chrono is given the Depend Card by Kamui, who had received it from Kouji prior to the infiltration. With the card currently blank, Chrono regains focus on getting Taiyou back to his normal self in the upcoming final game of the special match. Elsewhere, Kouji is on the run but is confronted by Shouma. After recalling his encounter with the original owner of the Gear Chronicle deck who told him about the Depend Card, Kouji fends off Shouma and continues onward.
240	44	"Chrono vs. Taiyou"; Transliteration: "Kurono VS Taiyō" (Japanese: クロノVSタイョウ)	Katsuhiko Bizen	Daisuke Ishibashi	September 6, 2015
The final game of the special match commences as Chrono fights Taiyou while trying to convince him that his current mindset is wrong. Unfazed by Chrono's plays and words, Taiyou calmly counters his moves and takes control of the fight. However, Chrono is cheered on by his friends and is reminded of the connections he made through Vanguard. Hoping to convey the message that Vanguard is more about fun and friendship to Taiyou, Chrono strides Chronodragon Nextage and wins the game, thereby winning the special match for Team TRY3. Before he and Taiyou could talk more, Kanzaki suddenly announces that he will fight against Chrono.
241	45	"Miracle / Chrono vs. Kanzaki"; Transliteration: "Kurono VS Kanzaki" (Japanese: クロノVS神崎)	Junichirō Hashiguchi	Kenichi Yamada	September 13, 2015
The epic battle between Chrono and Kanzaki begins. If Chrono wins, then Kanzaki must admit that his elitist philosophy is wrong. But if Kanzaki wins, then he will take Chrono's Gear Chronicle deck. Learning from his prior defeat to Kanzaki, Chrono puts up a close fight while carrying the feelings of all his friends. However, Kanzaki soon strides his true trump card: the fearsome Supremacy Black Dragon, Aurageyser Doomed...
242	46	"The Power to Transcend"; Transliteration: "Chōetsu Suru Chikara" (Japanese: 超越する力)	Yoshito Hata	Ayumu Hisao	September 20, 2015
Despite the overwhelming power of Kanzaki's Aurageyser Doomed, Chrono still has fun with the fight as he manages to completely protect himself from Kanzaki's assault. This leaves the audience in awe and Taiyou realizing the error of his ways. As he and the crowd start to liven up, Chrono makes one final attack with his Chronojet Dragon on Kanzaki. The force is so great that it destroys the GIRS system. Mysteriously, the attack makes it through and hits Kanzaki, which makes him come to a realization. In the end of the arduous fight, Chrono defeats Kanzaki, who suddenly declares that he will resign as manager of the United Sanctuary branch. Afterwards, Chrono and Taiyou reconcile, and Kouji pays a visit to Shin...
243	47	"Chrono vs. Kouji / Chrono vs. Ibuki"; Transliteration: "Kurono VS Ibuki" (Japanese: クロノVS伊吹)	Yūsuke Onoda	Kazuhiko Inukai	September 27, 2015
After Kanzaki's resignation, the United Sanctuary branch was left in disarray with many of its staff members and fighters leaving. Fortunately, Kouji temporarily returns to revise the branch and make it more hospitable than before, thus bringing back the lost staff and fighters. Later, Kouji calls out Chrono to tell him about the Depend Card. However, Chrono insists on cardfighting Kouji and finally settle the score with him. Meanwhile, Shin meets with Mikuru to talk about Chrono's father...
244	48	"Deciding Battle / Conclusion"; Transliteration: "Ketchaku" (Japanese: 決着)	Toshio Kiuchi	Kiyoko Yoshimura	October 4, 2015
Surviving a devastating attack from Kouji's Genesis Dragon, Excelics Messiah, Chrono makes one last attack to win the fight. At that moment, Chrono sees a vision of a little dragon, and then Chrono's Depend Card turns into that dragon: Chrono Dran. After finally revealing his name to Chrono, Kouji tells all that he knows to him. He informs Chrono that the Depend Card allows its holder to call a unit from Planet Cray to Earth and manifest itself as that card. Kouji also reveals that there is another person like Kanzaki who already has many Depend Cards to fulfill his own ambitions: Ryuzu Myoujin, a former member of the Vanguard Association and former friend of Chrono's father, Rive Shindou. After telling Chrono what happened to Rive, Kouji takes his leave. In the end, Chrono discovers that it was Kouji who had been secretly giving him more Gear Chronicle cards all along.
