= Seiji Maeda =

Japanese voice actor

- 前田 誠二
- Born: 1 July 1993 (age 33)
- Occupations: Voice actor; bass guitarist
- Years active: 2018–present
- Employer: Hibiki
- Notable work: Iroduku: The World in Colors as Shō Yamabuki; Try Knights as Tomomi Hōryū; Argonavis from BanG Dream! as Wataru Matoba; Oshi no Ko as Melt Narushima

Seiji Maeda (前田 誠二, Maeda Seiji; born 1 July 1993) is a Japanese voice actor affiliated with Hibiki. He is known for starring as Shō Yamabuki in Iroduku: The World in Colors, Tomomi Hōryū in Try Knights, Wataru Matoba in Argonavis from BanG Dream!, and Melt Narushima in Oshi no Ko.

== Biography ==
Seiji Maeda, a native of Osaka Prefecture, was born on 1 July 1993, the son of a football coach. He played football in elementary school and tennis in junior high and high school. He was inspired to go into voice acting by "Neon Genesis Evangelion", later recalling in an interview with Da Vinci that he was "interested in experiencing something that [he] couldn't in [his] own life alone and in being able to play someone other than [himself]". He was educated at Osaka Visual Arts Academy, where his mentor was Musui Terada, Afterwards he moved to Tokyo and attended a training school in the metropolis, followed by a vocational school where he learned swordsmanship.

Maeda had been considering early retirement if he "couldn't make a living from acting by the time [he] was about 25" when he passed the audition for his agency Hibiki, where the narrator was Shuta Morishima. In May 2018, he joined Bushiroad's From Argonavis project, and later became the bass player of tie-in band Argonavis, playing Wataru Matoba. He was a guest at CharaExpo USA 2018 at the Anaheim Convention Center. He starred as Tatsuya Tachibana in Cardfight!! Vanguard: Shinemon and Samuel Fredson in Cardfight!! Vanguard will+Dress.

In 2018, Maeda starred as Shō Yamabuki in Iroduku: The World in Colors. In 2019, he starred as Tomomi Hōryū in Try Knights. He voices Melt Narushima in Oshi no Ko.

Maeda speaks the Kawachi dialect. His special skills include tennis, swordsmanship, and scooping Super Balls.

== Filmography ==
=== Animated television ===
Year	Title	Role	Ref.
2018	Cardfight!! Vanguard: High School Arc Cont.	Ichirō Inanaga	
2018	Future Card Buddyfight Ace	Kanesada Kaji	
2018–2023	Goblin Slayer	Greenhorn Warrior	
2018	Iroduku: The World in Colors	Shō Yamabuki	
2019	Cardfight!! Vanguard: Shinemon	Tatsuya Tachibana	
2019	Kiratto Pri Chan	Staff	
2019	Mix	Club Member	
2019	Try Knights	Tomomi Hōryū	
2020	Argonavis from BanG Dream!	Wataru Matoba	
2021	Cardfight!! Vanguard overDress	Teammates	
2022	Black Summoner	Tōya Kanzaki	
2022	I've Somehow Gotten Stronger When I Improved My Farm-Related Skills	Knight	
2022	Life with an Ordinary Guy Who Reincarnated into a Total Fantasy Knockout	Jason, follower, minister, rebel	
2022	World's End Harem	Takamatsu	
2022	The Yakuza's Guide to Babysitting		
2023	Cardfight!! Vanguard will+Dress	Samuel Fredson	
2023	Helck	Axun	
2023	Oshi no Ko	Melt Narushima	
2023	My Clueless First Friend	Katsunori Tanaka	
2023	My Daughter Left the Nest and Returned an S-Rank Adventurer	Burns	
2023	The Reincarnation of the Strongest Exorcist in Another World	Male Exam Taker 1	
2023	You Were Experienced, I Was Not: Our Dating Story	Shūya	
2024	Spice and Wolf: Merchant Meets the Wise Wolf	Young Men	
2024	Let This Grieving Soul Retire!	Gilbert Busch	
2024	The Most Notorious "Talker" Runs the World's Greatest Clan	Wolf Lehman	

=== Original net animation ===
Year	Title	Role	Ref.
2023	D4DJ Mini Anime	News Announcer	

=== Video games ===
Year	Title	Role	Ref.
2021	Lost Judgment	Kenya Oshikiri	
2021	Argonavis from BanG Dream AAside	Wataru Matoba	
2021	Quiz RPG: The World of Mystic Wiz	Ritsu Takara	
2024	Argonavis: Kimi ga Mita Stage e	Wataru Matoba	
2025	Cookie Run: Kingdom	Black Sapphire Cookie	
