= Satoru Nishizono =

Japanese anime and tokusatsu drama screenwriter

- 西園 悟
- Born: Satoru Nishizono; April 28, 1962 (age 64); Kagoshima City, Kagoshima Prefecture, Japan
- Occupation: Screenwriter

Satoru Nishizono (西園 悟, Nishizono Satoru; born April 28, 1962) is a Japanese anime and tokusatsu screenwriter.

== Works ==
=== Anime television series ===
- Obocchama-kun (1989–1992) – Screenplay
- Wrestler Gundan Seisenshi Robin Jr. (1989–1990) – Screenplay
- Matchless Raijin-Oh (1991–1992) – Screenplay
- Superconductive Robot Tetsujin 28 FX (1992–1993) – Screenplay
- Crayon Shin-chan (1992–present) – Screenplay
- Nintama Rantarō (1993–present) – Screenplay
- Bonobono (1995–1996) – Screenplay
- Kuma no Puutarou (1995–1996) – Screenplay
- Tenchi Universe (1995) – Screenplay
- Midori no Makibaō (1996–1997) – Screenplay
- Haunted Junction (1997) – Series Composition, Screenplay
- Don't Leave Me Alone, Daisy (1997) – Series Composition, Screenplay
- Flame of Recca (1997–1998) – Screenplay
- Doctor Slump (1997–1999) – Series Composition, Screenplay
- Neo Ranga (1998–1999) – Screenplay
- Hatsumei Boy Kanipan (1998–1999) – Screenplay
- Dokkiri Doctor (1998–1999) – Series Composition, Screenplay
- Digimon Adventure (1999–2000) – Series Composition, Screenplay
- Corrector Yui (1999–2000) – Series Composition (episodes 27–52), Screenplay
- Great Teacher Onizuka (1999–2000) – Screenplay
- Digimon Adventure 02 (2000–2001) – Screenplay
- Gensomaden Saiyuki (2000–2001) – Screenplay
- Love Hina (2000) – Screenplay
- Sadamitsu the Destroyer (2001) – Screenplay
- Tales of Eternia (2001) – Screenplay
- Star Ocean EX (2001) – Screenplay
- Z.O.E. Dolores, I (2001) – Screenplay
- Shaman King (2001 TV series) (2001–2002) – Screenplay
- Kaze no Yojimbo (2001–2002) – Screenplay
- Okojo's Happy Apartment (2001–2002) – Series Composition, Screenplay, Song Lyrics
- Tokyo Underground (2002) – Screenplay
- Wild 7: Another (2002) – Series Composition, Screenplay
- Duel Masters (2002–2003) – Series Composition, Screenplay
- Naruto (2002–2007) – Screenplay
- .hack//Legend of the Twilight (2003) – Series Composition, Screenplay
- Duel Masters Charge (2004–2006) – Series Composition, Screenplay
- Sgt. Frog (2004–2011) – Screenplay
- Sore Ike! Zukkoke Sanningumi (2004) – Series Composition, Screenplay
- Ultimate Girls (2005) – Series Composition, Screenplay
- The Law of Ueki (2005–2006) – Screenplay
- Zoids: Genesis (2005–2006) – Series Composition, Screenplay
- Hell Girl (2005–2006) – Screenplay
- Zenmai Zamurai (2006–2009) – Screenplay
- Welcome to the N.H.K. (2006) – Series Composition, Screenplay, Song Lyrics
- Happiness! (2006) – Series Composition, Screenplay
- Shōnen Onmyōji (2006–2007) – Screenplay
- Strain: Strategic Armored Infantry (2006–2007) – Screenplay
- Naruto Shippuden (2007–2017) – Series Composition (episodes 1–53), Screenplay (episodes 1–53)
- El Cazador de la Bruja (2007) – Screenplay
- Kono Aozora ni Yakusoku o: Yōkoso Tsugumi Ryō e (2007) – Series Composition, Screenplay
- Toward the Terra (2007) – Screenplay
- Psychic Squad (2008–2009) – Series Composition, Screenplay
- Stitch! (anime) (2008–2009) – Screenplay
- A Certain Magical Index (2008–2009) – Screenplay
- Needless (2009) – Series Composition, Screenplay
- B Gata H Kei (2010) – Series Composition, Screenplay
- Hyakka Ryōran: Samurai Bride (2013) – Series Composition, Screenplay
- Gaist Crusher (2013–2014) – Series Composition, Screenplay
- Cardfight!! Vanguard (2018–2019) – Screenplay
- Cardfight!! Vanguard: High School Arc Cont. (2019) – Screenplay
- Cardfight!! Vanguard: Shinemon (2019–2020) – Screenplay
- Catch! Teenieping (2020–present) – Screenplay

=== Tokusatsu ===
- B-Robo Kabutack (1997–1998) – Screenplay
- B-Robo Kabutack: The Epic Christmas Battle!! (1997) – Screenplay
- B-Robo Kabutack: Traffic Safety (1998) – Screenplay
- Tetsuwan Tantei Robotack (1998–1999) – Screenplay
- Moero!! Robocon (1999–2000) – Main Screenwriter, Screenplay
- Moero!! Robocon vs. Ganbare!! Robocon (1999) – Screenplay
- Booska! Booska! (1999–2000) – Screenplay
- Ultraman Cosmos (2001–2002) – Screenplay (episode 11 only)

=== Original video animation ===
- Matchless Raijin-Oh (OVA) (1992–1993) – Screenplay
- Kero Kero Keroppi no Yowamushi-ouji no Daibouken (1993) – Original Work, Screenplay
- Kero Kero Keroppi no Gulliver no Bouken (1993) – Screenplay
- Kero Kero Keroppi no Kero Kero House no Himitsu (1993) – Original Work, Screenplay
- Kero Kero Keroppi no Robin Hood (1994) – Screenplay
- Kero Kero Keroppi no Tomodachi ni Narou yo (1994) – Screenplay
- Super Robot Taisen: Original Generation The Animation (2005) – Series Composition, Screenplay
- Happiness! Watarase Jun no Karei Naru Ichinichi – Oshimai (2007) – Series Composition, Screenplay
- The Idolmaster Live For You! (2008) – Screenplay

=== Films ===
- Kero Kero Keroppi no Bikkuri! Obakeyashiki (1996) – Screenplay
- Welcome to Pia Carrot!! -Sayaka's Love Story- (2002) – Screenplay
- Mazinkaiser vs. Shogun of Darkness (2003) – Screenplay
- Gekijouban Duel Masters: Curse of the Death Phoenix (2005) – Screenplay
