= Cardfight!! Vanguard: Shinemon =

- No. of episodes: 31

Release
- Original network: AbemaTV; Tokyo MX
- Original release: August 24, 2019 – March 28, 2020

Series chronology
- ← Previous; High School Arc Cont. Next → Gaiden if

Cardfight!! Vanguard V Series: Shinemon is a 2019 anime television series in the Cardfight!! Vanguard franchise that continues the reboot storyline of the V series, roughly based on the Cardfight!! Vanguard manga by Akira Ito.

The "Shinemon Arc" is an anime-exclusive storyline based around the events ten years prior to the whole storyline, as well Card Capital's beginnings. It is the third season of the V-series.

The episodes are first broadcast on TV Tokyo at 8.00 am JST Saturday and made available on the website AbemaTV at 9.00 pm JST on the same night. The episodes are also uploaded with English subtitles through the official YouTube channel and Crunchyroll. The English dubbed episodes are first broadcast at 9.00 pm EST on Friday nights.

== Plot ==
This is the story of "Shinemon Nitta", the future manager of Card Capital.

10 years before the reunion of Aichi Sendou and Toshiki Kai, the card shop run by the Tokura family "Card Capital" was going out of business. Then came the attempt to take over the store by Esuka Hibino, the owner of a major card shop.

To protect Card Capital, Shinemon Nitta takes on the role of its "Self-proclaimed Manager"

== Theme songs ==
Openings

- "Lead the way" by Aina Aiba (VR eps 1–31)
- "Legendary" by Roselia (Dubbed VR eps)

Endings

- "Gift" by Argonavis (VR eps 1–19)
- "Bokura no turn" by Niji no Conquistador (VR eps 20–31)
- "GIFT from THE FIGHT!!" by Tsubasa Yonaga & Takuya Satō (Japanese) Jovette Rivera (English) (Dubbed VR eps)

== Episode list ==
No. overall	No. in season	Title	Original release date	English air date
437	1	"I'm the Manager!!"; Transliteration: "Ore ga Tenchōda!!" (Japanese: オレが店長だ！！)	August 24, 2019	September 28, 2019
Shinemon Nitta is the self-proclaimed shop manager of Card Capital. Esuka Hibino, the president of a large card shop organization, stands against Shinemon, who is struggling to protect Card Capital.
438	2	"Welcome to Esuka!!"; Transliteration: "Esuka e Yōkoso!!" (Japanese: エスカへようこそ！！)	August 31, 2019	October 5, 2019
Shinemon Nitta has his deck stolen during the struggle to save Card Capital. Shinemon and Mark Whiting sneak into Esuka Hibino's head office to try and get the deck back.
439	3	"First Time Holding the Fort"; Transliteration: "Hajimete no Orushuban" (Japanese: はじめてのお留守番)	September 7, 2019	October 12, 2019
Shinemon Nitta entrusts his disciple Tatsuya Tachibana to take care of Card Capital for a day while Shinemon is away. However, Esuka Hibino's henchmen, Nanami Gonomi and Tonori Fujinami, show up, and try to take Mikuru Shindou away.
440	4	"Idol's Birth?"; Transliteration: "Aidoru Tanjō?" (Japanese: アイドル誕生?)	September 14, 2019	October 19, 2019
441	5	"Token Fight!! Plant VS Evil Decoy!!"; Transliteration: "Tōkun Taiketsu!! Puranto bui esu Ibirudekoi!!" (Japanese: トークン対決!! プラントV(ブイ)S(エス)妖魔変幻(イビルデコイ)!!)	September 21, 2019	October 26, 2019
442	6	"Last Ditch No Guard!!"; Transliteration: "Dotanba no Nōgādo!!" (Japanese: 土壇場のノーガード!!)	September 28, 2019	November 2, 2019
443	7	"Capital Revived!!"; Transliteration: "Kyapitaru Fukkatsu!!" (Japanese: キャピタル復活!!)	October 5, 2019	November 9, 2019
444	8	"Welcome to Capital!!"; Transliteration: "Kyapitaru e Yōkoso!!" (Japanese: キャピタルへようこそ!!)	October 12, 2019	November 16, 2019
445	9	"Valkerion's Tears"; Transliteration: "Varukerion no Namida" (Japanese: ヴァルケリオンの涙)	October 19, 2019	November 23, 2019
446	10	"End of Shinemon"; Transliteration: "Ashita naki Shinemon" (Japanese: 明日なき新右衛門)	October 26, 2019	November 30, 2019
447	11	"New, New Shinemon?"; Transliteration: "Shin Shin Shinemon?" (Japanese: 新・新・新右衛門？)	November 2, 2019	December 7, 2019
448	12	"Team Dragon's Vanity!!"; Transliteration: "Chīmu Ryū ga Dokuson!!" (Japanese: チーム竜牙独尊！！)	November 9, 2019	December 16, 2019
449	13	"Esu Cup Match"; Transliteration: "Esu Kappu Kesshō" (Japanese: エスカップ決勝)	November 16, 2019	December 21, 2019
450	14	"Card or Life"; Transliteration: "Kādo ka Jinsei ka" (Japanese: カードか人生か)	November 23, 2019	December 28, 2019
451	15	"Image Transformed!!"; Transliteration: "Imēji o Nurikaero!!" (Japanese: イメージを塗り替えろ!!)	November 30, 2019	January 11, 2020
452	16	"Trial of Deities"; Transliteration: "Kamigami no Jikken" (Japanese: 神々の実験)	December 7, 2019	January 18, 2020
453	17	"True Passion"; Transliteration: "Hontōni Yaritai Koto" (Japanese: 本当にやりたいこと)	December 14, 2019	January 25, 2020
454	18	"Examinees' Merry Christmas"; Transliteration: "Jukensei no Merī Kurisumasu" (Japanese: 受験生のメリークリスマス)	December 21, 2019	February 1, 2020
455	19	"Vanguard Abnormality, Shinemon Fight Encyclopedia"; Transliteration: "Vangādo Ihen Shinemon Faito Daizukan" (Japanese: ヴァンガ異変 新右衛門ファイト大図鑑)	December 28, 2019	February 8, 2020
456	20	"Gear Chronicle"; Transliteration: "Gia Kuronikuru" (Japanese: ギアクロニクル)	January 11, 2020	February 15, 2020
457	21	"Summoning Experiment"; Transliteration: "Shōkan Jikken" (Japanese: 召喚実験)	January 18, 2020	February 22, 2020
458	22	"The Day Before"; Transliteration: "Sono Zenjitsu" (Japanese: その前日)	January 25, 2020	February 29, 2020
459	23	"Clash between Master and Student"; Transliteration: "Shitei Gekitotsu" (Japanese: 師弟激突)	February 1, 2020	March 7, 2020
460	24	"The Real Opponent"; Transliteration: "Hontō no Aite" (Japanese: 本当の相手)	February 8, 2020	March 14, 2020
461	25	"The Night at Yumigatake"; Transliteration: "Yumigatake no Yoru" (Japanese: 弓ヶ岳の夜)	February 15, 2020	March 19, 2020
462	26	"Arch-aider Malkuth-melekh"; Transliteration: "Tokusō-tenki Marukuto-mereku" (Japanese: 特装天機マルクトメレク)	February 22, 2020	March 28, 2020
463	27	"Manifest the Units!!"; Transliteration: "Yunitto Genshutsu!!" (Japanese: ユニット現出!!)	February 29, 2020	April 4, 2020
464	28	"Our Wings"; Transliteration: "Ore-tachi no Tsubasa" (Japanese: オレたちの翼)	March 7, 2020	April 11, 2020
465	29	"Once Again, To Capital"; Transliteration: "Futatabi Kyapitaru He" (Japanese: ふたたびキャピタルへ)	March 14, 2020	April 18, 2020
466	30	"A New Vanguard"; Transliteration: "Aratanaru Sendō-sha" (Japanese: 新たなる先導者)	March 21, 2020	April 25, 2020
467	31	"Three Idols? / Shin Nitta"; Transliteration: "3-Ri no Aidoru? / Nitta Shin" (Japanese: 3人のアイドル？/新田シン)	March 28, 2020	May 2, 2020
