= Fukasawa =

Fukasawa (written: 深澤 or 深沢) is a Japanese surname. Notable people with the surname include:

- Hideyuki Fukasawa (深澤 秀行), Japanese composer
- Masahiro Fukasawa (深澤 仁博, born 1977), Japanese footballer
- Naoto Fukasawa (深澤 直人, born 1956), Japanese industrial designer

== Fictional characters ==
- Chigusa Fukasawa, a supporting character in Iroduku: The World in Colors
