= Cardfight!! Vanguard: The Movie =

2014 film by Shin Itagaki and Takashi Motoki

- Kanji: 劇場版 カードファイト!! ヴァンガード
- Revised Hepburn: Gekijōban Kādofaito!! Vangādo
- Directed by: Shin Itagaki (Neon Messiah); Takashi Motoki (Three Games)
- Screenplay by: Mayori Sekijima (Neon Messiah); Yutaka Bangadō (Three Games)
- Based on: Cardfight!! Vanguard by Bushiroad and Akira Itō
- Produced by: Akito Ōya; Hayato Nihei; Kōta Kuroda; Sadakazu Kikuchi; Shinnosuke Wada; Takuya Ōkōchi
- Starring: Tsubasa Yonaga; Takuya Satō; Mamoru Miyano; Daigo
- Cinematography: Daisuke Okumura
- Edited by: Kiyoshi Hirose
- Music by: Mamoru Mori
- Animation by: Liden Films
- Production companies: Ace Crew Entertainment; Bushiroad; Pony Canyon; Shochiku; Sotsu; Dentsu; TV Tokyo; TV Aichi
- Distributed by: Shochiku Co., Ltd.
- Release date: September 13, 2014
- Running time: 70 minutes (Neon Messiah); 50 minutes (Three Games); 120 minutes (total)
- Country: Japan
- Language: Japanese

Cardfight!! Vanguard: The Movie (Japanese: 劇場版 カードファイト!! ヴァンガード, Hepburn: Gekijōban Kādofaito!! Vangādo) is a 2014 Japanese animated/live-action science fantasy action film based on the Cardfight!! Vanguard series created by Bushiroad and Akira Itō. The film is divided into two segments: Neon Messiah (Japanese: ネオンメサイア, Hepburn: Neon Mesaia) the animated portion, and Three Games (Japanese: 3つのゲーム, Hepburn: 3-tsu no Gēmu), the live-action portion of the film. The film is co-produced by Liden Films and Ace Crew Entertainment, and was released in theaters in Japan on September 13, 2014.

== Premise ==
=== Neon Messiah ===
The card game that gathered millions of players all over the world has become part of daily life. Throughout this game that has captivated the world, two card fighters – Aichi Sendō and Kai Toshiki – have met many friends and rivals. From the bond he made with the unit "Blaster Blade", Aichi was entrusted with the wishes and prayers to save the Planet Cray from the brink of destruction, through a mysterious dream.

In that dream, Takuto Tatsunagi announced an invite-only tournament, then invited both Aichi and Kai to take part in Messiah Scramble. The first prize is the card named Messiah, the name of a savior that was heard in a dream. At the same time, the destruction of Planet Cray and disappearance of the units captivated the person that stood before the invitees, Kōji Ibuki.

=== Three Games ===
A blackmail sent to the police containing a video showing the letters VF in the flame. The criminal demands they call the strongest adult Vanguard fighter and fight him against three games.

== Cast ==
=== Neon Messiah ===
- Tsubasa Yonaga as Aichi Sendō
- Takuya Satō as Kai Toshiki
- Izumi Kitta as Misaki Tokura
- Shizuka Ishikawa as Kamui Katsuragi
- Atsushi Abe as Ren Suzugamori
- Toru Nara as Naoki Ishida
- Mamoru Miyano as Kōji Ibuki

=== Three Games ===
- Daigo as himself
- Suzuko Mimori as Kōrrin Tatsuragī

== Production ==
A film adaptation of Cardfight!! Vanguard was announced in August 2014 and featured separate stories from both animated and live-action portions. The animated portion was titled Neon Messiah while the live-action portion was titled Three Games. Neon Messiah was directed by Shin Itagaki, written by Mayori Sekijima, and produced by Liden Films. Three Games was directed by Takashi Motoki, written by Yutaka Bangadō and produced by Ace Crew Entertainment. Mamoru Miyano will voice a character in Neon Messiah segment, while Daigo portrayed a middle school teacher named Daigo in Three Games.

== Release ==
The film was released in Japanese theaters on September 13, 2014. It was released on DVD and Blu-Ray in Japan on May 2, 2015. An English sub was shown on July 4, 2015, at the Anime Expo in Los Angeles, California.
