= Cardfight!! Vanguard season 1 (2018 series) =

Cardfight!! Vanguard
- Season 1
- Official Poster for Cardfight!! Vanguard (2018) Series
- No. of episodes: 52

Release
- Original network: AbemaTV; Tokyo MX
- Original release: May 5, 2018 – May 4, 2019

Series chronology
- ← Previous; Cardfight!! Vanguard G: Z Next → High School Arc Cont.

Cardfight!! Vanguard (V Series) is a 2018–19 anime television series that is a reboot of the Cardfight!! Vanguard manga story by Akira Ito. It is the first season of the V Series and the tenth season overall in the Cardfight!! Vanguard series. The 52 episodes were released to the Japanese website AbemaTV from May 5, 2018, to May 4, 2019, at 9.00 pm JST on Saturdays, and were then broadcast on the TV station Tokyo MX at 10.30 pm JST on the same night. The episodes are also uploaded simultaneously with English subtitles through the official YouTube channel and Crunchyroll.

== Plot ==
"Aichi Sendou is a timid and mundane third-year middle school boy. As a child, he was given the Blaster Blade, an important, rare card from Cardfight!! Vanguard, a card game set in the imaginary world of Planet Cray. When he reunited with Toshiki Kai, the person who had given him the card, Aichi's life began to change."

While expanding his horizons and meeting many different fighters, Aichi has a mysterious experience of hearing the voices of units from Planet Cray--- that closely resembles Psyqualia, the power held by "Ren Suzugamori", the leader of Team Asteroid.

It is a story of fighters who clash with each other through fights.

== Theme song ==
Openings

- "Legendary" by Roselia (eps 1–26)
- "Destiny Calls" by Team Ultra-Rare (eps 27–52)
- "INVINCIBLE FIGHTER" by Raise A Suilen (VD eps 1–??)

Endings

- "GIFT from THE FIGHT!!" by Tsubasa Yonaga & Takuya Satō (Japanese), Jovette Rivera (English) (eps 1–12)
- "Triangle Massage" by Tsubasa Yonaga, Takuya Sato & Atsushi Abe (eps 13–26)
- "Mainichi Climax ☆" by Milky Holmes (eps 27–38)
- "UNSTOPPABLE" by Raise A Suilen (eps 39–52)
- "Takin' my Heart" by Raise A Suilen (VD eps 1–??)

== Episode list ==
No. overall	No. in season	Title	Original release date	English air date
371	1	"Stand Up, Vanguard!!"; Transliteration: "Sutando Appu Vangādo!!" (Japanese: スタンドアップ・ヴァンガード!!)	May 5, 2018	May 26, 2018
372	2	"Ride the Vanguard!!"; Transliteration: "Raido Za Vangādo!!" (Japanese: ライド・ザ・ヴァンガード!!)	May 12, 2018	June 2, 2018
373	3	"Who's the Strongest Cardfighter!!"; Transliteration: "Saikyō Faitā wa Dareda!!" (Japanese: 最強ファイターは誰だ!!)	May 19, 2018	June 9, 2018
374	4	"Misaki's Secret!!"; Transliteration: "Misaki no Himitsu!!" (Japanese: ミサキのひみつ!!)	May 26, 2018	June 16, 2018
375	5	"Let's Go To Card Capital!!"; Transliteration: "Kaado Kyapitaru ni ikou!!" (Japanese: カードキャピタルに行こう!!)	June 2, 2018	July 7, 2018
376	6	"Declaration of War!! Battle of the Shops"; Transliteration: "Sensen Fukoku!! Shoppu Taikō-sen" (Japanese: 宣戦布告!! ショップ対抗戦)	June 9, 2018	July 14, 2018
377	7	"Unite!! Q4 (Quadrifoglio)"; Transliteration: "Kessei!! Kuadoriforio" (Japanese: 結成!! Q4(クアドリフォリオ))	June 16, 2018	July 23, 2018
378	8	"Turbulence!! Q4 VS NwO"; Transliteration: "Haran!! Kuadoriforio Buiesu Nagisa Uizu Azāzu" (Japanese: 波乱!! Q4 VS NwO(ナギサウィズアザーズ))	June 23, 2018	July 30, 2018
379	9	"Kai Loses!!"; Transliteration: "Kai, yabureru!!" (Japanese: 櫂(かい), 敗れる!!)	June 30, 2018	August 4, 2018
380	10	"Wind of Aichi!!"; Transliteration: "Aichi no kaze!!" (Japanese: アイチの風!!)	July 7, 2018	August 11, 2018
381	11	"Battle of Men!!"; Transliteration: "Otokotachi no Tatakai!!" (Japanese: 男たちの戦い!!)	July 14, 2018	August 18, 2018
382	12	"Mysterious Enemy Asteroid!!"; Transliteration: "Nazo no Teki Fūfaitā!!" (Japanese: 謎の敵・フーファイター!!)	July 21, 2018	August 25, 2018
383	13	"Kamui!! Revenge of Determination"; Transliteration: "Kamui!! Ketchaku no Ribenji!!" (Japanese: カムイ!! 決着のリベンジ!!)	July 28, 2018	September 1, 2018
384	14	"Awakening!! PSYQualia"; Transliteration: "Kakusei!! Saikuoria" (Japanese: 覚醒!! PSY(サイ)クオリア)	August 4, 2018	September 8, 2018
385	15	"FRIEND"; Transliteration: "Furendo" (Japanese: FRIEND(フレンド))	August 11, 2018	September 15, 2018
386	16	"Their Respective Feelings"; Transliteration: "Sorezore no Omoi" (Japanese: それぞれの想い)	August 18, 2018	September 22, 2018
387	17	"A Jet Black Knight!! Blaster Dark"; Transliteration: "Shikkoku no Kishi!! Burasutā Dāku" (Japanese: 漆黒の騎士!!ブラスター・ダーク)	August 25, 2018	September 29, 2018
388	18	"Kai, Ren, and Aichi too" Transliteration: "Kai to Ren, soshite Aichi" (Japanese: 櫂(かい)とレン, そしてアイチ)	September 1, 2018	October 06, 2018
389	19	"Tetsu's Motive"; Transliteration: "Tetsu no Omowaku" (Japanese: テツの思惑)	September 8, 2018	October 13, 2018
390	20	"Reunion"; Transliteration: "Saikai" (Japanese: サイカイ)	September 15, 2018	October 20, 2018
391	21	"Abyss of Darkness"; Transliteration: "Yami no Shin'en" (Japanese: 闇(やみ)の深(しん)淵(えん))	September 22, 2018	October 27, 2018
392	22	"A Serious Fight"; Transliteration: "Honki no Faito" (Japanese: 本気(ほんき)のファイト)	September 29, 2018	November 03, 2018
393	23	"A Little Beacon"; Transliteration: "Chiisana hikari" (Japanese: 小(ちい)さな光(ひかり))	October 6, 2018	November 10, 2018
394	24	"Kai"; Transliteration: "Kai" (Japanese: 櫂(かい))	October 13, 2018	November 17, 2018
395	25	"Vanguard"; Transliteration: "Vangādo" (Japanese: 先導者(ヴァンガード))	October 20, 2018	November 24, 2018
396	26	"Vanguard Abnormality!? Unit Encyclopedia!!"; Transliteration: "Vanga ihen!! Yunitto dai zukan" (Japanese: ヴァンガ異変!! ユニット大図鑑)	October 27, 2018	December 1, 2018
397	27	"Stand Up! High School Life"; Transliteration: "Sutando Appu! Haisukūru Raifu!!" (Japanese: スタンドアップ！ハイスクール・ライフ)	November 3, 2018	December 8, 2018
398	28	"Cardfight Club Initiated!"; Transliteration: "Kādofaito-bu, Hajimemasu!" (Japanese: カードファイト部、始めます！)	November 10, 2018	December 15, 2018
399	29	"New Allies"; Transliteration: "Aratana Nakama" (Japanese: 新たな仲間)	November 17, 2018	December 22, 2018
400	30	"My Idol"; Transliteration: "Watashi no Aidoru" (Japanese: 私のアイドル)	November 24, 2018	January 04, 2019
401	31	"The Backstage Boss"; Transliteration: "Kage no Banchō" (Japanese: 影の番長)	December 1, 2018	January 11, 2019
402	32	"First Exchange Match"; Transliteration: "Hajimete no Kōryūsen" (Japanese: 初めての交流戦)	December 8, 2018	January 18, 2019
403	33	"Vanguard Koshien"; Transliteration: "Vangado Kōshien" (Japanese: ヴァンガード甲子園)	December 15, 2018	January 25, 2019
404	34	"Another Vanguard"; Transliteration: "Mō Hitori no Vangādo" (Japanese: もうひとりの先導者ヴァンガード)	December 22, 2018	February 01, 2019
405	35	"Concert Master, Takuto"; Transliteration: "Konsāto Masutā Takuto" (Japanese: コンサートマスター タクト)	January 5, 2019	February 08, 2019
406	36	"Destiny Conductor"; Transliteration: "Disutinī Kondakutā" (Japanese: ディスティニーコンダクター)	January 12, 2019	February 15, 2019
407	37	"Invasion of the PSYqualia Zombie"; Transliteration: "Saikuoria Zonbi Shūrai" (Japanese: PSYクオリアゾンビ襲来)	January 19, 2019	February 22, 2019
408	38	"Beyond Imagination!"; Transliteration: "Unmei o Koero!" (Japanese: 運命を超えろ!)	January 26, 2019	March 01, 2019
409	39	"True Strength"; Transliteration: "Hontō no Chikara" (Japanese: 本当の力)	February 2, 2019	March 08, 2019
410	40	"True and Fake"; Transliteration: "Honmono to Nisemono" (Japanese: 本物と偽者)	February 9, 2019	March 15, 2019
411	41	"Phantom Final Turn"; Transliteration: "Maboroshi no Fainaru Tān" (Japanese: 幻のファイナルターン)	February 16, 2019	March 22, 2019
412	42	"Called Walkers, Those Ruled by Fate"; Transliteration: "Kōrudouōkā Unmei Ni Sasō Tori Sa Reshi Mono" (Japanese: コールドウォーカー運命に支酉されし者)	February 23, 2019	March 29, 2019
413	43	"Distorted Bonds"; Transliteration: "Yugame Rareta Kizuna" (Japanese: 歪められた絆)	March 2, 2019	April 5, 2019
414	44	"Entangled Fate"; Transliteration: "Karami au Unmei" (Japanese: 絡みあう運命)	March 9, 2019	April 12, 2019
415	45	"Rivalry"; Transliteration: "Sōkoku" (Japanese: 相克)	March 16, 2019	April 19, 2019
416	46	"The Vilest Enemy: Aichi"; Transliteration: "Saikyō no Teki Aichi" (Japanese: 最凶の敵・アイチ)	March 23, 2019	April 26, 2019
417	47	"The Truth of Destiny Conductor"; Transliteration: "Unmei o Shiki Suru Mono (Disutinī Kondakutā), Sono Shōtai" (Japanese: 運命を指揮する者(ディスティニーコンダクター)、その正体)	March 30, 2019	May 3, 2019
418	48	"Kai's Memory"; Transliteration: "Kai no Kioku" (Japanese: 櫂の記憶)	April 6, 2019	May 10, 2019
419	49	"Bonds"; Transliteration: "Kizuna" (Japanese: 絆)	April 13, 2019	May 17, 2019
420	50	"The Day When Vanguard Disappears"; Transliteration: "Vangādo ga Kieru hi" (Japanese: ヴァンガードが消える日)	April 20, 2019	May 24, 2019
421	51	"Messiah"; Transliteration: "Mesaia" (Japanese: 救世主(メサイア))	April 27, 2019	May 31, 2019
422	52	"Vanguard Abnormality!! Unit Encyclopedia Grade 2!!"; Transliteration: "Vanga Ihen!! Yunitto Dai Zukan Gureido Tu!!" (Japanese: ヴァンガ異変!! ユニット大図鑑グレイド2!!)	May 4, 2019	June 7, 2019
