= Yu-Gi-Oh! R =

Japanese manga series

- First tankōbon volume cover

遊☆戯☆王 R (Yūgiō Āru)
- Genre: Adventure, science fiction
- Created by: Kazuki Takahashi
- Manga
- Written by: Akira Itō
- Published by: Shueisha
- English publisher: NA: Viz Media
- Magazine: V Jump
- Original run: April 21, 2004 – December 21, 2007
- Volumes: 5
- Other series
- List of all Yu-Gi-Oh! series
- Other media
- Video games; Trading card game
- icon

Yu-Gi-Oh! R (遊☆戯☆王 R, Yūgiō Āru; lit. 'Game King R') is a Japanese manga series written by Akira Itō, based on Kazuki Takahashi's Yu-Gi-Oh! manga. The series, which is a spin-off to the original manga, was serialized in Shueisha's V Jump magazine between April 2004 and December 2007, with its chapters collected in five tankōbon volumes. It was published in North America by Viz Media.

== Plot ==
Yu-Gi-Oh R takes place following Yugi Mutou's victory in the Battle City tournament. Yako Tenma, the protégé and adopted son of Maximillion Pegasus, (Note: The Japanese version of Yu-Gi-Oh! R and the original manga call him Pegasus J. Crawford, while the English versions of both published by Viz Media call him Maximillion J. Pegasus. The English Duel Monsters and other English-language Yu-Gi-Oh! merchandise call him Maximillion Pegasus.) decides to avenge his teacher's defeat at the hands of Yugi, believing him to be responsible for Pegasus' alleged death. After taking over KaibaCorp while Seto Kaiba is in the United States, Tenma kidnaps Anzu Mazaki, (Note: Téa Gardner in the English version of the Duel Monsters anime) prompting Yugi and his friend Katsuya Jonouchi (Note: Joey Wheeler in the English version of the Duel Monsters anime) to face Tenma's RA Project and duel professors from the US. Seto Kaiba and his brother Mokuba also come to the scene to rescue the company.

== Characters ==
Many of the characters that are exclusive to Yu-Gi-Oh! R have names that are also Intel codenames. Intel codenames in turn are frequently taken from names of cities and towns near Intel factories in Oregon, Washington, and other locations.

Yako Tenma (天馬 夜行, Tenma Yakō)
The protégé and adopted son (often mistaken, or mistranslated as younger brother) of Maximillion Pegasus (Pegasus J. Crawford in the Japanese version) who wants revenge for Pegasus' defeat.
Deschutes Lew (デシェーツ・ルー, Deshētsu Rū)
The first professor. Yugi defeats him. He is named after the Deschutes River and Deschutes County, Oregon. "Deschutes" is also a pre-release codename for the 333 MHz P6 Intel Pentium II chip.
Tilla Mook (ティラ・ムーク, Tira Mūku)
The second professor, who plays a vampire-themed deck. Yugi defeats her. She is named after Tillamook, Oregon. "Tillamook" is also a pre-release codename for the Embedded 266 MHz Intel Pentium MMX chip.
Klamath Osler (クラマス・オースラー, Kuramasu Ōsurā)
The third professor, who has such bad luck. Jonouchi defeats him. He is named after Klamath Falls, Oregon. "Klamath" is also a pre-release codename for the 300 MHz Intel Pentium II chip.
Kirk Dixon (カーク・ディクソン, Kāku Dikuson)
The fourth professor, who plays a machine-themed deck. Yugi defeats him. "Dixon" is also a pre-release codename for the 333 MHz 1.6V Intel Pentium II chip. His key card Commander Covington (督戦官コヴィントン Tokusenkan Covinton) originates from "Covington" codenamed for the 266 MHz P6 Intel Pentium II chip.
Pete Coppermine (ピート・コパーマイン, Pīto Kopāmain)
The fifth professor, who plays a mutant-themed deck. Jonouchi defeats him. He is named after the Coppermine River in Oregon. The name of that river was used as a codename for the 866 MHz Flip Chip Pin Grid Array (FCPGA) Pentium III (P3-850) microprocessor, which was released by Intel.
Maico Katou (マイコ･カトウ, Maiko Katō) a.k.a. Mrs. Maico (ミセス・マイコ, Misesu Maiko)
The sixth professor, who is an old woman in a wheelchair that plays a forest-themed deck. Yugi defeats her. "Maico" is an alternate romanization of the name "Maiko", but it also refers to a brand of motorcycle. Kato Engineering is a company associated with motorcycles. The name also originates from the "KatMai" chip.
Gekko Tenma (天馬 月行, Tenma Gekkō)
Yako Tenma's older brother (although only slightly older, since they are identical twins). Gekko wants to stop the RA project. He uses an elf deck. "Gekko" is the name of the microprocessor chip in the GameCube.
Mendo Cino (メンド・シーノ, Mendo Shīno)
Mendo, the seventh professor, uses an insect deck. Jonouchi defeats him. "Mendocino" is also a pre-release codename for the 300 MHz P6 Intel Pentium II Centrino chip.
Willa Mette (ウィラー・メット, Wirā Metto)
Willa, the eighth professor, plays a White Horns Dragon deck. Kaiba defeats him. Willamette is a river in Oregon and a codename for Intel's 1.5 GHz P7 Pentium IV.
Tedd Banias (テッド・バニアス, Teddo Baniasu)
Tedd, the ninth professor, duels Gekko. Gekko defeats Tedd. Uses a Beast Deck. Banias is the codename for Intel's first x86 Pentium M chip.
Reiko Kitamori (北森 玲子, Kitamori Reiko)
Reiko, the tenth professor, duels Jonouchi. Jonouchi defeats Reiko. Uses a Chess/Deck Destruction Deck. Kitamori means northwood in Japanese. Northwood was the codename for the 130 nm version of Intel's Pentium 4 microprocessor.
Depre Scott (デプレ・スコット, Depure Sukotto)
Scott is the eleventh professor, and another of Pegasus' adopted sons. Yugi defeats Depre. He duels against Yugi using a Universe Deck. Prescott was the codename for the 90 nm version of Intel's Pentium 4 microprocessor.
Richie Merced (リッチー・マーセッド, Ritchī Māseddo)
Richie is the twelfth professor, and another of Pegasus' adopted sons. He duels Gekkou and wins. Merced was the codename for Itanium, an IA-64 microprocessor developed jointly by Intel and Hewlett-Packard.
Cedar Mill (シｰダｰ・ミｰル, Shīdā Mīru)
Cedar is the thirteenth professor and, although he is not actually named in the actual manga, dispatched almost offhandedly in a single panel by Yugi's Osiris the Heaven Dragon (Slifer the Sky Dragon in the English version), Cedar is identified in a sketch in the 4th volume of the collected manga. Cedar Mill was the codename for the 65 nm version of Intel's Pentium 4 microprocessor. It is also a play on "Cedar Mills", which is an area in Beaverton, Oregon.
Masumi Momono (百野真澄, Momono Masumi)
Appears in a special chapter of Yu-Gi-Oh! R. Momono tries to take over the Kame Game Shop owned by Sugoroku Mutou. His key card Tualatin (テュアラティン, Thuarathin) originates from "Tualatin" codename for the 1.266 GHz Flip Chip Pin Grid Array (FCPGA2) Pentium III (P3-850) microprocessor, which was released by Intel.

== Publication ==
Written and illustrated by Akira Itō, under supervision by Kazuki Takahashi, Yu-Gi-Oh! R was serialized for 44 chapters in Shueisha's magazine V Jump from April 21, 2004, to December 21, 2007. (Note: It finished in the magazine's February 2008 issue, published on December 21, 2007.) Shueisha collected its chapters in five tankōbon volumes, released from March 4, 2005, to April 4, 2008.

In North America, the manga was licensed for English release by Viz Media. The five volumes were published from October 6, 2009, to June 1, 2010. The manga was added to Viz Media's Shonen Jump online service in 2018.

=== Volumes ===
No.	Original release date	Original ISBN	English release date	English ISBN
1	March 4, 2005	4-08-873822-5	October 6, 2009	978-1421530062
Duel R1: "A Wicked Shadow...!?" (邪悪なる影…！？, Jāku Naru Kage...!?) / "A Wicked Shadow!"; Duel R2: "Avatar's Menace!!" (アバターの神威！！, Abatā no Shini!!); Duel R3: "KC Tournament, Start!! (KC決戦、開始！！, Kei Shī Kessen, Kaishi!!) / "KaibaCorp Duel Begins!!"; Duel R4: "Menace of the Immortal Deck!!" (不死デッキの脅威！！, Fushi Dekki no Kyōi!!) / "Terror of the Immortal Deck!!"; Duel R5: "Jonouchi's Clever Plan" (城之内の奇策, Jōnouchi no Kisaku) / "Jonouchi's Plan"; Duel R6: "Threat of the Armored Unit!!" (威の機甲部隊！！, I no Kikōbutai!!) / "Marvelous Armed Division!!"; Duel R7: "Jonouchi, Again!!" (城之内、再び！！, Jōnouchi, Futatabi!!) / "There Goes Jonouchi"; Duel R8: "Dweller in the Deep Darkness!!" (深き闇の住人！！, Fukaki Yami no Jūnin!!) / "Dweller in the Dark!!"; Duel R9: "A Fearsome God, Descends!!" (恐怖の神、降臨す！！, Kyōfu no Kami, Kōrin su!!) / "A Fearsome God Descends!!"
Set after Battle City, Yako Tenma hacks Kaiba Corp. and takes it over while Seto Kaiba is away. He then challenges Dark Yugi to a duel and overwhelms him with The Wicked Avatar, a creature on par with the Egyptian God Cards. Yako abruptly cancels the duel and kidnaps Anzu, revealing he blames Yugi for Pegasus' death. He tells the boys to fight their way up Kaiba Corp. past his card professors to rescue Anzu. The first professor, Deschutes Lew, reveals Anzu's soul has been sealed in a card and gives it to them. Dark Yugi defeats his defensive deck. He then defeats Tilla Mook's Vampire deck and Jonouchi borrows her duel disk since he forgot his. Jonouchi and Honda fall down a trap door into the basement where Jonouchi defeats Klamath Osler's Antlion deck. Dark Yugi defeats Kirk Dixon's Machina deck. Jonouchi defeats Pete Coppermine's Mutant deck. Dark Yugi defeats Maico Kato's Forest deck. Dark Yugi meets Yako halfway up the building and duels him, only to be shocked when he summons another Wicked God, The Wicked Dreadroot.
2	December 2, 2005	4-08-873893-4	December 1, 2009	978-1-4215-3007-9
Duel R10: "A World Ruled by Terror!!" (恐怖が支配する世界！！, Kyōfu ga Shihai suru Sekai!!); Duel R11: "The Conclusion, And...!?" (決着、そして…！？, Ketchaku, Soshite...!?) / "The Showdown, And Then...?!"; Duel R12: "Jonouchi, Cornered!?" (城之内、絶体絶命！？, Jōnouchi, Zettaizetsumei!?) / "Curtains for Jonouchi?!"; Duel R13: "Enter, Seto Kaiba!!" (海馬瀬人、登場！！, Kaiba Seto, Tōjō!!) / "Enter Seto Kaiba!!"; Duel R14: "The Menace of "Mist"!!" ("ミスト"の脅威！！, "Misuto" no Kyōi!!); Duel R15: "Ultimate Life Form, Descend!" (究極の生命体、降臨！, Kyūkyoku no Seimei-tai, Kōrin!) / "Advent of the Ultimate Life-Form!!"; Duel R16: "The Tenma Brothers' Secret...!!" (天馬兄弟の秘密…！！, Tenma Kyōdai no Himitsu...!!); Duel R17: "The Elf Warriors!!" (エルフの戦士たち！！, Erufu no Senshi-tachi!!)
After a hard fought duel, Dark Yugi defeats The Wicked Dreadroot, but Croquet cancels the duel and reveals that his opponent was Yako's twin brother Gekko under mind control. Now snapped out of it, they explain that Yako plans to use Anzu's soulless body as a vessel to resurrect Pegasus. Gekko also explains that Yugi can put Anzu's card on his duel disk to communicate with her, briefly reuniting them. Jonouchi defeats Mendo Cino's Mantis deck. Seto and Mokuba Kaiba arrive to take Kaiba Corp. back. Seto defeats Willa Mette's White-Horned Dragon deck and enters the building. Yugi and Gekko meet a resurrected Bandit Keith, then since Dark Yugi is exhausted, Gekko faces Ted Banias's Beast deck with his Elf deck after putting away his deck with The Wicked Dreadroot.
3	September 4, 2006	4-08-874260-5	February 2, 2010	978-1-4215-3008-6
Duel R18: "The Perfect Duel!!" (パーフェクト決闘！！, Pāfekuto Kettō!!); Duel R19: "Helpless Jonouchi!!" (翻弄される城之内！！, Honrōsareru Jōnouchi!!) / "Jonouchi...Helpless?!"; Duel R20: "The Anger of Seto Kaiba!" (怒りの海馬瀬人！, Ikari no Kaiba Seto!) / "The Rage of Kaiba!!"; Duel R21: "The Truth of the R.A. Project!!" (R・A計画の真相！！, Āru Ei Keikaku no Shinsō!!); Duel R22: "Showdown in Outer Space!!" (宇宙空間の決戦！！, Uchū Kūkan no Kessen!!) / "Outer Space Showdown"; Duel R23: "Toy Magic!!" (トイ・マジック！！, Toi Majikku!!); Duel R24: "Another Partner!!" (もう一人の相棒！！, Mō Hitori no Aibō!!); Special Duel: "Dark Ruler, Summoned!!" (冥王、召喚！！, Mei-Ō, Shōkan!!) / "Summon The Dark Ruler!!"
Gekko defeats Ted. Bandit Keith beats Ted up, then offers to lead Yugi and Gekko to Yako. Jonouchi defeats the shy Reiko Kitamori's Puppet Chess/deck destruction deck while Seto reaches Yako, who explains his plan. Since Dark Yugi is still tired, Yugi takes over and defeats Depre Scott's Cosmic Deck with his Toy deck. In a special chapter set before or after the story, the bully Masumi Momono duels people by using decks specialized to counter them, then takes their cards after he wins. Despite using a Light deck to counter Dark Yugi's Dark monsters, Dark Yugi defeats him.
4	April 4, 2007	4-08-874351-2	April 6, 2010	978-1-4215-3009-3
Duel R25: "Richie's Fight, Start!!" (リッチー戦、開始！！, Ritchī-sen, Kaishi!!) / "Gekko vs. Richie"; Duel R26: "Pegasus' Minion!!" (ペガサスミニオン！！, Pegasasu Minion!!) / "Pegasus's Prodigies!!"; Duel R27: "Respective Battle!!" (それそれの闘い！！, Soresore no Tatakai!!) / "To Each His Own Battle!!"; Duel R28: "Apex Arena!!" (頂点の闘技場！！, Chōten no Tōgi-ba!!); Duel R29: "Summon The Evil God!!" (邪神召還！！, Jashin Shōkan!!); Duel R30: "Unsurpassable "1"" (超えられない「1」, Koe Rare Nai "Ichi") / "The Invincible "1""; Duel R31: "R.A. Launched!!" (R・A発動, Āru Ei Hatsudō) / "Rebirth of Avatar!!"; Duel R32: "Pegasus Summoned!?" (ペガサスの召喚！？, Pegasasu no Shōkan!?) / "The Resurrection of Pegasus?!"
Gekko then faces Richie Merced's Cowboy deck, but unfortunately loses, so Richie locks the door and refuses to let him and Yugi advance. Bandit Keith then challenges Richie for his rare black duel disk. Jonouchi and Honda beat up guards until they meet Mokuba who shows them a path. After Yako explains Pegasus created the Wicked God Cards to counter the Egyptian God Cards, Seto duels Yako but loses when Yako summons both The Wicked Avatar and The Wicked Dreadroot. Keith defeats Richie with The Wicked Eraser and claims his black duel disk. Yako says his project is almost complete and Pegasus is almost reborn. Yugi and Gekko find an alternate path and hurry to Yako and Anzu's body. Mokuba hacks the system and prevents the resurrection, infuriating Yako. After Dark Yugi defeats Cedar Mill offscreen, they meet Jonouchi and Honda, but Keith challenges Jonouchi, seeking revenge for his previous defeat, so Jonouchi tells the others to go ahead.
5	April 4, 2008	4-08-874441-1	June 1, 2010	978-1-4215-3010-9
Duel R33: "Rematch!! Keith vs. Jonouchi" (再闘!!キースVS城之内, Saito!! Kīsu Tai Jōnouchi); Duel R34: "Last Evil God, Descend!!" (最後の邪神、降臨！！, Saigo no Jashin, Kōrin!!) / "The Last Jashin Rises!!"; Duel R35: "Jonouchi, Fight Back!!" (城之内、反撃！！, Jōnouchi, Hangeki!!) / "Jonouchi Strikes Back!!"; Duel R36: "Devil God Destroyed! (邪神消滅！, Jashin Shōmetsu!) / "Death of a God!!"; Duel R37: "Final Showdown!" (最終決戦！, Saishū Kessen!) / The Final Showdown; Duel R38: "Offense and Defense of the Summoned God" (神召喚の攻防, Kami Shōkan no Kōbō) / "Clash of the Gods!!"; Duel R39: "Godspeed Summons!!" (神速召喚！！, Shinsoku Shōkan!!) / "Speed Summon!!"; Duel R40: "Ruler of the Field" (世界の支配者, Sekai no Shihaisha) / "Reign of the Avatar"; Duel R41: "Existence of Another Person" (もう一人の存在, Mō Hitori no Sonzai) / "The Other"; Duel R42: "Clash! God vs. Devil God" (激突！神VS邪神, Gekitotsu! Kami Tai Jashin) / "God vs. Evil God!!"; Duel R43: "Annihilation!! And..." (対消滅！！ そして…, Tsuishōmetsu!! Soshite...) / "Mutually Assured Destruction"; Duel R44: "The End of the Battle" (闘いの果て, Tatakai no Hate)
Despite Bandit Keith trying to cheat, Jonouchi defeats his Motor deck and The Wicked Eraser, claiming the black duel disk. Dark Yugi finally faces Yako. When he summons The Wicked Avatar, its malevolent power absorbs Anzu's soul and restarts the resurrection project. Dark Yugi destroys The Wicked Avatar, restoring Anzu's soul to her body and freeing Yako from its influence, letting him see a vision of Pegasus. Apologetic, Yako attempts to surrender, but Gekko convinces him to continue the duel just for fun. Dark Yugi ultimately wins. Yako apologizes and rips The Wicked Avatar in half. Everyone is reunited with Anzu. The card professors also apologize and Jonouchi gives Tilla Mook the black duel disk.
