= Cardfight!! Vanguard: High School Arc Cont. =

- No. of episodes: 14

Release
- Original network: AbemaTV; Tokyo MX
- Original release: May 11 – August 10, 2019

Series chronology
- ← Previous; Vanguard (2018) Next → Shinemon Arc

Cardfight!! Vanguard V Series: High School Arc Cont. (カードファイト！！ ヴァンガード 続・高校生編, Kādofaito!! Vangādo zoku kōkōsei-hen) is a 2019 anime television series in the Cardfight!! Vanguard franchise that continues the reboot storyline of the V series, roughly based on the Cardfight!! Vanguard manga by Akira Ito. The anime-exclusive episodes were first broadcast on TV Tokyo at 8.00 am JST Saturday and made available on the website AbemaTV at 9.00 pm JST on the same night. The episodes are also uploaded with English subtitles through the official YouTube channel and Crunchyroll.

== Plot ==
The main protagonist Aichi Sendou, was a timid and mundane third-year middle school boy. He received a Blaster Blade card as a child, a rare card from Vanguard, a card game with the imaginary world of Planet Cray. From the day he reunited with the person who gave him that card Toshiki Kai, Aichi's everyday life began to change.

Aichi and his friends protected Planet Cray from the threat of an invasion by Wandering Star Brandt. However, with destiny being corrected, memories of Kourin Tatsunagi and the battle against Brandt have disappeared.

With the "Vanguard Koshien" fast approaching, the battle to regain the missing "something" begins for the vanguards.

== Theme music ==
The BanG Dream! band Raise A Suilen performs the season's opening "INVINCIBLE FIGHTER" and ending "Takin' my Heart".

== Episode list ==
No. overall	No. in season	Title	Original release date	English air date
423	1	"Disband!!"; Transliteration: "Wai bu!!" (Japanese: 廃部!!)	May 11, 2019	June 14, 2019
Aichi Sendou and friends from the Miyaji Academy Cardfight Club look forward to participating in the Vanguard Koshien. However, with a lack of members in the club, the Student Council sends them a notice to disband.
424	2	"Aichi's the Coach!?"; Transliteration: "Kōchi wa Aichi!?" (Japanese: コーチはアイチ！？)	May 18, 2019	June 21, 2019
The Miyaji Academy Cardfight Club challenges the Student Council for the club's survival. As the Student Council doesn't seem to improve in their fights at all, Aichi Sendou decides to become their coach.
425	3	"Evil-eyed Prince from Another World Sings of the Strongest Hero and Love"; Transliteration: "Isekai tensei shita yokoshima me no ōji wa, saikyō yūsha to ai o utau" (Japanese: 異世界転生した邪眼の王子は、最強勇者と愛を謳う)	May 25, 2019	June 28, 2019
The fight between Miyaji Academy Cardfight Club and the Student Council begins. What are the hidden feelings that the secretary, Maki Nagashiro, has towards Naoki Ishida? Will the fearsome ability of Eru Nakagami from the Paranormal Power Research Society bear its fang against Shingo Komoi again?
426	4	"Beyond Globalization!!"; Transliteration: "Gurōbaru o koero!!" (Japanese: グローバルを超えろ！！)	June 1, 2019	July 5, 2019
It's the final battle of the challenge. With his way with words, Tatewaki Naitou, the Student Council president, makes Aichi Sendou his adviser. Can Misaki Tokura overcome the odds and save the club against such powerful adversaries?
427	5	"Lost Imagination"; Transliteration: "Ushinawareta Imēji" (Japanese: 失われたイメージ)	June 8, 2019	July 12, 2019
Some fighters are tormented by mysterious disorders. Kamui Katsuragi brings Kyou Yahagi to visit Voyage, where he encounters Rekka Tatsunagi. Meanwhile, Tetsu Shinjou chases after Kyou, and Toshiki Kai meets Kenji Mitsusada again.
428	6	"The Beginning of The End"; Transliteration: "Hajimari no Ji Endo" (Japanese: はじまりのジ・エンド)	June 15, 2019	July 19, 2019
Mamoru Anjou was waiting for Toshiki Kai at Voyage. In Mamoru's possession was a new Overlord card. Mamoru asked Kai to a fight, which lead to Kai reminiscing about his first encounter with Overlord.
429	7	"Greion's Whisper"; Transliteration: "Gureiwon no Sasayaki" (Japanese: グレイヲンの囁き)	June 22, 2019	July 26, 2019
After the battle against Wandering Star Brandt, Kouji Ibuki was filled with a sense of guilt so strong, it reached his soul. Ibuki received an invitation to a meeting at the Tatsunagi Foundation. Waiting for him there was Nome Tatsunagi.
430	8	"The Last Delete End"; Transliteration: "Za Rasuto Derīto Endo" (Japanese: Theザ・・・ラスト・デリートエンド)	June 29, 2019	August 2, 2019
Kouji Ibuki refuses to use the power of the Deletors with all of his heart. He decides to discard his deck and quit Vanguard, but Leon Soryu appears to try and stop him.
431	9	"Ruler's Resolution"; Transliteration: "Ōja no Ketsui" (Japanese: 王者の決意)	July 6, 2019	August 9, 2019
Kouji Ibuki, who had gained a new power, appears before Tetsu Shinjou, whom he had deleted previously. Ibuki wanted to fight Asaka Narumi in order to gain a spot within Fukuhara's team for the Vanguard Koshien.
432	10	"Stand Up! The Vanguard Koshien!!"; Transliteration: "Sutando Appu!! Vangādo Kōshien!!" (Japanese: スタンドアップ！！ヴァンガード甲子園！！)	July 13, 2019	August 16, 2019
Time has passed, and the Miyaji Academy, Hitsue, Fukuhara, and Harumi Vanguard Clubs have all advanced to the semi-finals. The first match is between Fukuhara and Harumi. Which school will win and proceed to the finals?
433	11	"Welcome Back, Kai"; Transliteration: "Okaeri, Kai" (Japanese: おかえり、櫂)	July 20, 2019	August 23, 2019
It's the second match of the semifinals between Miyaji Academy and Hitsue. However, the Solitary Fighter Toshiki Kai seems to be missing. Are there still some side effects from being Deleted that may appear during the match?
434	12	"Memories Neither from the Past Nor Future"; Transliteration: "Kako Demo Mirai Demonai Kioku" (Japanese: 過去でも未来でもない記憶)	July 27, 2019	August 31, 2019
It's the finals, between Miyaji Academy and Fukuhara. Aichi Sendou entrusts the last fight to Naoki Ishida, and faces off against Ren Suzugamori during the first match. While Ren enjoys the fight, his PSYqualia activates, showing him the destiny he had lost.
435	13	"Decisive Fight!!"; Transliteration: "Ketchaku!!" (Japanese: 決着!!)	August 3, 2019	September 7, 2019
It's the final match of the Vanguard Koshien, between Naoki Ishida and Kouji Ibuki! Because of Naoki's overwhelming and passionately burning feelings during the fight, Kourin Tatsunagi herself has an intense feeling welling up inside of her.
436	14	"Welcome to the CF Club"; Transliteration: "Yōkoso, Kādofaito Buhe" (Japanese: ようこそ、カードファイト部へ)	August 10, 2019	September 14, 2019
No matter how far away, the roads of destiny intersect with guidance from the soul. Kourin Tatsunagi appeals for an exhibition match against Miyaji Academy, the school whose club won the Vanguard Koshien.
