= Try Knights =

Japanese manga and anime series

- Cover of Try Knights volume 1 by Media Factory

トライナイツ (Torai Naitsu)
- Genre: Sports (Rugby)
- Manga
- Written by: Shunsaku Yano
- Illustrated by: Rihito Takarai (characters); Chizuka Erisawa (art)
- Published by: Media Factory
- Magazine: Monthly Comic Gene
- Original run: June 15, 2018 – August 16, 2019
- Volumes: 3
- Anime television series
- Directed by: Tadayoshi Sasaki
- Written by: Makoto Takada
- Music by: R・O・N
- Studio: Gonzo (Note: Production assistance (制作協力) for all episodes provided by Seven.)
- Licensed by: Sentai Filmworks
- Original network: Nippon TV
- Original run: July 30, 2019 – October 15, 2019
- Episodes: 12

Try Knights (トライナイツ, Torainaitsu) is a Japanese rugby manga series written by Shunsaku Yano and illustrated by Chizuka Erisawa, with original character designs by Rihito Takarai. It was serialized in Media Factory's shōjo manga magazine Monthly Comic Gene from June 15, 2018, to August 16, 2019, and was collected in three tankōbon volumes. An anime television series adaptation by Gonzo aired from July 30 to October 15, 2019.

== Plot ==
Despite his passion for the sport, Riku Haruma has abandoned rugby due to his small physique and lack of physical strength. Upon entering Seiran High, he witnesses Hikari Kariya playing rugby with raw, instinctive ability. Unable to ignore what he sees, Riku offers him technical advice, which immediately improves Hikari's performance.

Recognizing Riku's keen understanding of the game, Hikari invites him to join the rugby club, seeking to reach higher levels together. Inspired by Hikari's passion and natural talent, Riku rediscovers his own love for rugby and agrees to join the team, taking on a strategic role.

== Characters ==
Riku Haruma (遥馬理久, Haruma Riku)
Voiced by: Shōgo Sakamoto
Akira Kariya (狩矢光, Kariya Akira)
Voiced by: KENN
Tomomi Hōryū (宝立友未, Hōryū Tomomi)
Voiced by: Seiji Maeda
Pearce Valentine Shōtani (翔谷・ピアーズ・ヴァレンタイン, Shōtani Piāzu Varentain)
Voiced by: Shuta Morishima
Seiichirō Nade (灘誠一郎, Nade Seiichirō)
Voiced by: Yoshiki Nakajima
Tori Fuyuhara (冬原灯利, Fuyuhara Tori)
Voiced by: Takuma Terashima
Sōya Randō (蘭堂槍也, Randō Sōya)
Voiced by: Kōhei Amasaki
Keita Oguma (小熊景太, Oguma Keita)
Voiced by: Hidenori Takahashi
Reo Asamiya (朝宮怜皇, Asamiya Reo)
Voiced by: Takuya Satō
Yukiya Katashiro (片城雪也, Katashiro Yukiya)
Voiced by: Wataru Urata
Akiomi Suruga (駿河暁臣, Suruga Akiomi)
Voiced by: Tomoya Fukui
Rinto Arimura (有村凛斗, Arimura Rinto)
Voiced by: Shun Horie
Shōgo Tenkawa (天河将吾, Tenkawa Shōgo)
Voiced by: Haruki Ishiya

== Media ==
=== Manga ===
No.	Release date	ISBN
1	March 27, 2019	978-4-04-065188-0
2	March 27, 2019	978-4-04-065581-9
3	August 27, 2019	978-4-04-065581-9

=== Anime ===
An anime television series adaptation was announced in the April issue of Monthly Comic Gene on March 15, 2019. The series is animated by Gonzo and directed by Tadayoshi Sasaki, with Makoto Takada handled series composition, Kan Soramoto designed the characters, and R・O・N composed the music. It aired from July 30 to October 15, 2019, on NTV and other channels. The opening theme is "Infinite Try" (無限のトライ, Mugen no Try) performed by Shōgo Sakamoto, while the ending theme is "Pattern" (模様, Moyō) performed by Ivy to Fraudulent Game. Crunchyroll streamed the series. On February 20, 2020, Sentai Filmworks announced that they licensed the series.

No.	Title (Note: All English titles are taken from Crunchyroll.)	Original air date
1	"The Moon and the Sun"; Transliteration: "Tsuki to Taiyō" (Japanese: 月と太陽)	July 30, 2019
2	"Athleticism and Tactics"; Transliteration: "Fijikaru to Takutikusu" (Japanese: フィジカルとタクティクス)	August 6, 2019
3	"The Past and the Future"; Transliteration: "Kako to Mirai" (Japanese: 過去と未来)	August 13, 2019
4	"Failing and Overcoming"; Transliteration: "Zasetsu to Kokufuku" (Japanese: 挫折と克服)	August 20, 2019
5	"Opposition and Oaths"; Transliteration: "Hankō to Chikai" (Japanese: 反抗と誓い)	August 27, 2019
6	"Cleansing and Conflict"; Transliteration: "Seisō to Kattō" (Japanese: 清爽と葛藤)	September 3, 2019
7	"Frenzy and Ambush"; Transliteration: "Kyōbō to Fukuhei" (Japanese: 狂暴と伏兵)	September 10, 2019
8	"Rugby and Chess"; Transliteration: "Ragubī to Chesu" (Japanese: ラグビーとチェス)	September 17, 2019
9	"Pawns and Teammates"; Transliteration: "Koma to Nakama" (Japanese: 駒と仲間)	September 24, 2019
10	"Soran and Sekirei"; Transliteration: "Soran to Sekirei" (Japanese: 蒼嵐と赤麗)	October 1, 2019
11	"Confidence and Trust"; Transliteration: "Shin'yō to Shinrai" (Japanese: 信用と信頼)	October 8, 2019
12	"Younger and Elder"; Transliteration: "Oto to Ani" (Japanese: 弟と兄)	October 15, 2019
