= From Argonavis =

Japanese multimedia project

- Promotional art

フロム アルゴナビス (Furomu Arugonabisu)
- Manga
- Written by: Kou Nakamura
- Illustrated by: Kyohei Miyajima
- Published by: Bushiroad
- Original run: 2019 – present
- Manga
- Written by: Bushiroad
- Illustrated by: Kyohei Miyajima
- Published by: Shueisha
- Magazine: Shōnen Jump+
- Original run: August 11, 2020 – March 23, 2021
- Volumes: 2
- Anime television series
- Directed by: Hiroshi Nishikiori
- Written by: Nobuhiro Mōri
- Music by: Ryō Takahashi
- Studio: Sanzigen
- Licensed by: SEA: Muse Communication
- Original network: JNN (MBS, TBS)
- Original run: April 10, 2020 – July 3, 2020
- Episodes: 13
- Anime film

Gekijōban Argonavis: Ryūsei no Obligato
- Directed by: Shigeru Morikawa
- Written by: Nobuhiro Mōri
- Music by: Ryō Takahashi
- Studio: Sanzigen
- Released: November 19, 2021
- Runtime: 89 minutes
- Anime film

Gekijōban Argonavis Axia
- Directed by: Shigeru Morikawa
- Written by: Nobuhiro Mōri
- Music by: Ryō Takahashi
- Studio: Sanzigen
- Released: March 24, 2023
- Runtime: 64 minutes

From Argonavis (stylized as from ARGONAVIS, originally titled Argonavis from BanG Dream! in 2018–2021) is a Japanese multimedia project by Bushiroad. An anime television series by Sanzigen aired from April 10 to July 3, 2020, on the Super Animeism block. A rhythm mobile game by DeNa titled Argonavis from BanG Dream! AAside featuring five bands was released in Japan on January 14, 2021. A compilation anime film titled Gekijōban Argonavis: Ryūsei no Obligato premiered on November 19, 2021, and a new anime film titled Gekijōban Argonavis Axia premiered in March 2023.

In November 2021, it was announced that the project changed its name from Argonavis from BanG Dream! to From Argonavis. This means that the project is now a whole of its own instead a part of the BanG Dream! franchise. A new company centered to manage the project, Argonavis Co., Ltd., was established with Daisuke Hyūga as the public relations manager. Some additions include establishment of a fanclub, server termination of rhythm game AAside, and new smartphone game ARGONAVIS -Kimi ga Mita Stage e- in development.

In October 2024, it was announced that the franchise would enter an indefinite hiatus towards the end of 2025.

== Concept ==
From Argonavis' former name was stylistically written in all caps (ARGONAVIS from BanG Dream!) to differentiate the project and band names. Although it was titled Argonavis from BanG Dream!, the BanG Dream! franchise creator Takaaki Kidani stated that there will be no interaction between the girls in the main BanG Dream! universe and the new project as the IPs do not take place within the same universe. While the Argonavis project was originally planned as an extension of the general BanG Dream! franchise, mixed reception to the appearance of male characters in the original all-female franchise prompted Argonavis to be turned into an independent project in an alternative continuity.

Unlike the original BanG Dream! which is set in Shinjuku, Tokyo, Argonavis from BanG Dream! is set in Hakodate, Hokkaido. The first band, Argonavis, consists of five first-year university students. They begin their debut with their "0th Live", which was held July 29, 2018. The second "0th live" was held on September 15, following the third live on December 10 of the same year. The lives were held at Shimokitazawa GARDEN. Argonavis' first original song, "Steady Goes!" was distributed for free for those who attended their first "0th" live.

The band's first single "Goal Line" (ゴールライン) was released on February 20, 2019. Their second single "Starting Over" was released on August 21, 2019.

The band's first live was held on May 17 at Maihama Amphitheater, Chiba Prefecture. The projects announces manga serialization as well as music video for "Goal Line". Their second live titled Voice -Hoshizora no Shita no Yakusoku= (VOICE -星空の下の約束-) will be held on December 5, 2019, at Tokyo Dome City Hall.

On November 5, 2019, Bushiroad announced that the franchise will have both an anime series scheduled for Spring 2020 and a rhythm mobile game scheduled for early Spring 2021 release. The franchise also introduced three new bands: εpsilonΦ, Fujin Rizing!, and Fantôme Iris. The bands will be featured in the new game along with the Argonavis and Gyroaxia.

== Characters ==
=== Argonavis ===
A college students pop rock band based in Hakodate, Hokkaido.

Ren Nanahoshi (七星 蓮, Nanahoshi Ren)
Voiced by: Masahiro Itō
Vocalist. A first-year university student who is studying at the Faculty of Law. He could not forget the excitement of the outdoor live he saw as a child, and wished to stand on a big stage one day. However, since he is not good at communicating with other people, he would only sing on his own at karaoke sessions until he was scouted by Yūto, who was looking for vocalist for Argonavis. He is usually a calm person but will get fired up when it comes to music.
Yūto Goryō (五稜 結人, Goryō Yūto)
Voiced by: Daisuke Hyūga
Guitarist. A first-year university student who is studying at the Faculty of Literature. Born within a prestigious family in Hakodate, he immersed himself with music activities due to his inferiority complex towards his superior older brothers. He is strong-minded and optimistic, and does not doubt that he will one day become successful with his band and that his family will finally look at him. With his creed "we wouldn't know before we try it", he created Argonavis with enough confidence.
Wataru Matoba (的場 航海, Matoba Wataru)
Voiced by: Seiji Maeda
Bassist. A first-year university student who is studying at the Faculty of Literature. His father used to be a seafarer and his mother's whereabouts are unknown. He has always been with his older brother since they were small. He started to become interested in bass because his brother was in a band. He is a prudent character who makes negative remarks to those who try to talk positively. However, he does that to make the band successful.
Rio Kikyō (桔梗 凛生, Kikyō Rio)
Voiced by: Shuta Morishima
Keyboardist. A first-year university student who is studying at the Faculty of Political Science and Economics. Being surrounded by study, sports, and music to the point that he could do anything, he is nicknamed "Shindou", (meaning child prodigy) by people around him. Above all, he hoped to be a baseball player, but got hurt before the Koshien and had to give up his baseball career. He doesn't show his real emotions but will respond to people who need him and try his best.
Banri Shiroishi (白石 万浬, Shiroishi Banri)
Voiced by: Shohei Hashimoto
Drummer. A first-year university student who is studying at the Faculty of Business. He wants to make a name for himself and earn money with the band to rebuild his parents' dairy farm that was sunk with debts. From his experience of playing taiko when he was young, he showcased a powerful performance and sold himself to joining Argonavis. He made use of the fact that his drumming is surprisingly powerful from someone his height and stature to be able to join Argonavis. With a thorough pragmatism and a personality that dislikes waste, he is constantly a high tension and a mood maker.

=== Gyroaxia ===
A college students hard rock band based in Sapporo, Hokkaido.

Nayuta Asahi (旭 那由多, Asahi Nayuta)
Voiced by: Jin Ogasawara
Vocalist. He leads GYROAXIA due to his powerful vocals and overwhelming charisma. He expects nothing from his band members other than the best. However, if they are not up to his expectations, he won't hesitate to cut them off without warning. He seems to be doing all this to get back at his father, who was a legendary bandman, for abandoning him and his mother. He has no other interests other than music to the point where he initially has a disconnect with his bandmates.
Kenta Satozuka (里塚 賢汰, Satozuka Kenta)
Voiced by: Shinichi Hashimoto
Guitarist. Bewitched by Nayuta Asahi's talent, this leader of GYROAXIA spares no effort in making his name well-known. He is proficient in intel-gathering and uses it to gather information on rival bands, among others. While he adores Nayuta, he doesn't adore him as his own person rather, he adores him as a vocalist. Since he lives in different homes from Wataru Matoba, due to their parents' divorce, he worries about him a lot.
Reon Misono (美園 礼音, Misono Reon)
Voiced by: Takumi Mano
Guitarist. A stubborn man who is also very exceedingly patient. He's the enthusiastic hardworker type who won't stop trying until he excels. While he strongly opposes Nayuta's dictatorial ways, he recognizes the talent in GYROAXIA and strongly believes they deserve to be on top. The only person who has guts to bear his fangs towards Nayuta, but against someone as unpredictable as him, he always holds back from directly confronting him.
Ryo Akebono (曙 涼, Akebono Ryō)
Voiced by: Hiroto Akiya
Bassist. He committed a crime back on his home planet and was banished to Earth as punishment. His crime was "the inability to make people happy". So he will stay on this planet until he is able to make someone happy... or so he says. He's a rare kind of genius—one able to join GYROAXIA without much of a sweat.
Miyuki Sakaigawa (界川 深幸, Sakaigawa Miyuki)
Voiced by: Kōsuke Miyauchi
Drummer. He was a kickboxer before switching over to drums to get more popular. Making use of his natural strength, he engraved GYROAXIA's rhythm to anyone who ears with a flashy manner. He's nice to kids and women, looks superficial at first, but he's actually quite stoic. He's among the oldest in GYROAXIA and also admires Nayuta. However, he doesn't get along with Kenta's idea of throwing away his humanity for him.

=== Fantôme Iris ===
A visual kei band from Nagoya. They go by stage names during lives. The members are all working adults.

Felix Louis-Claude Mont D'or / FELIX (フェリクス・ルイ = クロード・モンドール, Ferikusu Rui = Kurōdo Mondōru)
Voiced by: Arthur Lounsbery
Vocalist.
Tomoru Kurokawa / LIGHT (黒川 燈, Kurokawa Tomoru)
Voiced by: Masaya Wada
Guitarist.
Jun Suzaki / ZACK (洲崎 遵, Suzaki Jun)
Voiced by: Jun Fukuyama
Guitarist.
Koharu Mitsurugi / HARU (御劔 虎春, Mitsurugi Koharu)
Voiced by: Tsubasa Yonaga
Bassist.
Daimon Kusunoki / D (楠 大門, Kusunoki Daimon)
Voiced by: Taiyō Ayukawa
Drummer.

=== Fujin Rizing ===
A college students ska band based in Nagasaki.

Futa Kaminoshima (神ノ島 風太, Kaminoshima Futa)
Voiced by: Yoshiki Nakajima
Vocalist and Saxophonist.
Yamato Tsubaki (椿 大和, Tsubaki Yamato)
Voiced by: Makoto Kaneko
Guitarist.
Kohei Hayasaka (早坂 絋平, Hayasaka Kohei)
Voiced by: Atsushi Abe
Bassist.
Aoi Wakakusa (若草 あおい, Wakakusa Aoi)
Voiced by: Kōdai Sakai
Trombonist.
Misaki Goto (五島 岬, Goto Misaki)
Voiced by: Hiroyuki Yoshino
Drummer.

=== Epsilon Phi ===
A techno pop electronic rock band from Kyoto composed of middle school and high school students.

Shu Ujigawa (宇治川 紫夕, Ujigawa Shuu)
Voiced by: Yuki Sakakihara
Vocalist.
Haruka Nijō (二条 遥, Nijō Haruka)
Voiced by: Gakuto Kajiwara
Vocalist and Guitarist. Older twin brother of Kanata Nijo
Kanata Nijō (二条 奏, Nijō Kanata)
Voiced by: Taichi Ichikawa
Bassist. Younger twin brother of Haruka Nijo.
Tadaomi Kurama (鞍馬 唯臣, Kurama Tadaomi)
Voiced by: Haruki Ishiya
Synthesizer.
Reiji Karasuma (烏丸 玲司, Karasuma Reiji)
Voiced by: Shinnosuke Tachibana
Drummer.

=== Straystride ===
A two-person rock band from Osaka. They previously won the LRFes and had their major debut but ended up disbanding.

Rintarō Yodogawa (淀川 麟太郎, Yodogawa Rintarō)
Voiced by: SHIN
Vocalist.
Ryusuke Tennoji (天王寺 龍介, Tennoji Ryusuke)
Voiced by: Yū Hayashi
MC/rapper.

=== Other characters ===
Kenzō "Master" Hakkōda (八甲田 健三, Hakkōda Kenzō)
Voiced by: Atsushi Miyauchi
Owner of the cafe Submariner.
Shintaro Mashū (摩周 慎太郎, Mashū Shintaro)
Voiced by: Takuya Satō
Manager of Gyroaxia.
Kōga Iryū (伊龍恒河, Iryū Kōga)
Voiced by: Kishō Taniyama
Vocalist of the legendary band SYANA and Nayuta Asahi's Father.

== Music ==
An animation music video for "Goal Line" animated by Sanzigen will be some time in 2019. The band's second single, "Starting Over" was used as the theme song in the video game Card Fight!! Vanguard Ex; its coupling song is the ending song of Cardfight!! Vanguard's anime adaptation.

Singles
Title	Artist(s)	Release date	Peak Oricon chart positions	Notes
"Goal Line" (ゴールライン)	Argonavis	February 20, 2019	34	Argonavis' first single
"Starting Over/Gift" (STARTING OVER/ギフト)	Argonavis	August 21, 2019	34	Argonavis' second single
"Hoshi ga Hajimaru" (星がはじまる)	Argonavis	April 29, 2020	17	Argonavis' third single that is used as opening for the TV animation series
"SCATTER"	Gyroaxia	June 10, 2020	11	Gyroaxia's first single
"Starting Over" (STARTING OVER feat.旭 那由多 from GYROAXIA)	Argonavis feat. Nayuta Asahi from Gyroaxia	June 15, 2020	—	Digital limited single
Play With You	εpsilonΦ	August 30, 2020	—	Digital limited single
IGNITION	Gyroaxia	September 12, 2020	—	Digital limited single
Histoire	Fantôme Iris	September 25, 2020	—	Digital limited single
Joukyou Joutou Ittekimasu☆ (上京上等行ってきまーす☆)	Fujin RIZING!	October 26, 2020	—	Digital limited single
EGOIST	Gyroaxia	November 30, 2020	—	Digital limited single
Restart (リスタート)	Argonavis	December 27, 2020	—	Digital limited single

Albums
Title	Artist(s)	Release date	Peak Oricon chart positions	Notes
Voice/Manifesto	Argonavis x Gyroaxia	January 15, 2020	31	Joint mini album of Argonavis and Gyroaxia
Starry Line	Argonavis	August 12, 2020	3	Argonavis' first album

== Media ==
=== Anime ===
An anime adaptation for the franchise was announced on November 4, 2019. The series is animated by Sanzigen and directed by Hiroshi Nishikiori, with Nobuhiro Mōri handling series composition, Hikaru Miyoshi designing the characters, and Ryō Takahashi composing the series' music. It aired from April 10 to July 3, 2020, on the Super Animeism block on MBS, TBS, and other channels.

==== Episode list ====
No.	Title (Note: All English titles are literal translation.)	Original release date
1	"To place where there is light" "Hikari Aru Tokoro e" (Japanese: 光あるところへ)	April 10, 2020
2	"Genius and Enthusiasm" "Tensai to Nekkyō" (Japanese: 天才と熱狂)	April 17, 2020
3	"Our Departure" "Bokutachi no Fune" (Japanese: 僕たちの出航)	April 24, 2020
4	"Between Dream and Reality" "Yume to Genjitsu no Aida ni" (Japanese: 夢と現実の間に)	May 1, 2020
5	"Farewell to the Past" "Kako kara no Ketsubetsu" (Japanese: 過去からの決別)	May 8, 2020
6	"Meteor Shower" "Ryūseiu" (Japanese: 流星雨)	May 15, 2020
7	"Across the waves" "Namima o Koete" (Japanese: 波間を越えて)	May 22, 2020
8	"Resonance" "Kyōmei" (Japanese: 共鳴)	May 29, 2020
9	"Challenge to the Unknown" "Michi e no Chōsen" (Japanese: 未知への挑戦)	June 5, 2020
10	"Break the limit!" "Genkai Toppa!" (Japanese: 限界突破！)	June 12, 2020
11	"To the place of destiny" "Unmei no basho e" (Japanese: 運命の場所へ)	June 19, 2020
12	"Goal Line" "Gōru Rain" (Japanese: ゴールライン)	June 26, 2020
13	"Pray"	July 3, 2020

=== Films ===
During the Argonavis AAside New Year Live-Streamed 'NaviZome' Online event on January 9, 2021, it was announced that a new anime film project is in production. A compilation film titled Gekijōban Argonavis: Ryūsei no Obligato has also been announced and premiered on November 19, 2021. The new anime film project, titled Gekijōban Argonavis Axia, was originally set to premiere in Japanese theaters in Q3 2022, but it was later delayed to November 4, 2022, and then to March 24, 2023.

=== Mobile game ===
A mobile rhythm game developed by DeNa titled Argonavis from BanG Dream AAside (with AA pronounced as Double A) was released on January 14, 2021. The game featured three bands other than Argonavis and Gyroaxia: Fantôme Iris, Fujin RIZING!, and εpsilonΦ. It was initially planned for a late 2020 release before being postponed to spring 2021 to continue development and ensure a better product. On January 31, 2022, the game was shut down, however it was announced that a new game would commence development soon. On May 22, 2023, the game ARGONAVIS -Kimi ga Mita Stage e- (アルゴナビス -キミが見たステージへ-, ARGONAVIS -To the Stage You've Dreamed Of) was announced, along with the addition of a new band titled Straystride. The game is a band raising simulator in which players raise the stats of band members by leveling up cards and using the "produce" mechanic. It was planned for a Summer 2023 release, but was postponed to Winter 2023, and yet again postponed to the first half of 2023. The game was officially released on February 7, 2024. On October 7, 2024, it was announced the game would end its service on November 30, 2024.
