= Jovette Rivera =

American singer

Jovette Rivera (born November 26, 1982) is an American multi-platinum selling music producer and composer, and co-founder of Royal Kingdom Music. Working with top major artists in Asia since 2007, he has had numerous number-ones on the music charts in Japan.

Jovette writes music primarily for singers, television, video games, and commercials.He wrote and produced the 2018 theme song for the INAC Kobe Soccer League "We Are" performed by H5, and the 2008 theme song for the Niigata "Albirex", another national Japanese soccer team.

== Original songs (released) ==
Artist	Song (Title)	Label	Credit	Original Release
KAT-TUN	EUPHORIA	Johnny's Entertainment, Japan	Composer, Arrangement	September 2021
Yuichi Nakamaru	change your mind	Johnny's Entertainment, Japan	Music, Arranger	September 2020
KAT-TUN	Diamond Sky	Johnny's Entertainment, Japan	Lyrics	July 2019
KAT-TUN	MoonLight	Johnny's Entertainment, Japan	Lyrics, Composer	July 2018
KAT-TUN	World's End.	Johnny's Entertainment, Japan	Lyrics, Composer, Arranger	July 2018
H5	WE ARE	HM Entertainment, Japan	Composer, Lyricist, Arranger	2018
Sexy Zone	Easy Come! Easy Go! Easy Love!	Johnny's Entertainment, Japan	Composer	February 2016
KAT-TUN	Dead or Alive	Johnny's Entertainment, Japan	Lyrics, Composer, Arranger	January 2015
Kis-My-Ft2	Deep your voice	Johnny's Entertainment, Japan	Composer	March 2012
Jin Akanishi	Yellow Gold	Johnny's Entertainment, Japan	Composer, Arranger	May 2011
Jin Akanishi	Oowah	Johnny's Entertainment, Japan	Composer, Arranger	May 2011
Lee Joon-gi	Fiery Eyes	IMX, Korea, Japan	Lyrics, Composer, Arranger	January 2010
KAT-TUN	MOON	Johnny's Entertainment, Japan	Composer	April 2009
Uchi Hiroki	All The Way	Johnny's Entertainment, Japan	Composer, Arranger	December 2009
Wada Akiko	Eien Ga Mieru Basho	Teichiku Entertainment, Japan	Composer, Arranger	May 2008
Ya-Ya-Yah	BABY BABE	Johnny's Entertainment, Japan	Composer	September 2007

== Select discography (CDs, DVDs, performances and television shows) ==
Single / Album / DVD	Artist(s)	Label	Role/Credit	Date	Chart#
Spring Paradise ~Crush The Frontline~	HiHi Jets	Johnny's Entertainment, Japan	Composer, Arranger [Overture BGM]	December 22, 2022	-
PACHI-SLOT "TEKKEN" Series Vocal Tracks	Jovette Rivera	Bandai Namco Entertainment, Japan	Singer「Black Blood Destiny」	November 7, 2022	-
HONEY LIVE TOUR 2022	KAT-TUN	Johnny's Entertainment, Japan	Composer, Arranger	November 2, 2022	#1 Oricon Japan DVD Chart
Follow Your Dream [Sint-Truidense V.V. Sponsor Song]	Jovette Rivera	Nishitan Clinic, Japan	Singer, Lyricist	June 20, 2022	-
Hadaka no Shounen 2021	HiHi Jets & Bishounen	Johnny's Entertainment, Japan	Composer, Arranger [Dance BGM Section]	April 28, 2022	-
Honey	KAT-TUN	Johnny's Entertainment, Japan	Composer, Arranger	March 29, 2022	#1 Oricon Japan Album Chart #1 iTunes Japan Album Chart
15TH ANNIVERSARY LIVE	KAT-TUN	Johnny's Entertainment, Japan	Composer, Arranger	November 24, 2021	#1 Oricon Japan DVD Chart
We Just Go Hard feat. AK-69 / EUPHORIA	KAT-TUN	Johnny's Entertainment, Japan	Composer, Arranger	September 8, 2021	#1 Oricon Japan Single Chart
Roar	KAT-TUN	Johnny's Entertainment, Japan	Composer, Arranger	March 10, 2021	#1 Oricon Japan Single Chart
Hey! Say! JUMP LIVE TOUR 2019-2020 PARADE	Hey! Say! JUMP	Johnny's Entertainment, Japan	Composer, Arranger [Dance BGM Section]	August 5, 2020	#1 Oricon Japan DVD Chart
Hadaka no Shounen	HiHi Jets & Bishounen	Johnny's Entertainment, Japan	Composer, Arranger「Yellow Gold」	July 13, 2020	-
DanKira!!! Music Collection	Jovette Rivera	Konami Digital Entertainment, Japan	Singer, Lyricist「Risky Business」	June 10, 2020	#31 Oricon Japan Album Chart
OUR BEST	Jin Akanishi	Go Good Records, Japan	Composer, Arranger	April 22, 2020	#1 Oricon Japan Album Chart
KAT-TUN LIVE TOUR 2019 IGNITE	KAT-TUN	Johnny's Entertainment, Japan	Lyrics	April 8, 2020	#1 Oricon Japan DVD Chart
IGNITE	KAT-TUN	Johnny's Entertainment, Japan	Lyrics	July 31, 2019	#1 Oricon Japan Album Chart
Rain	Kazuya Kamenashi	Johnny's Entertainment, Japan	Composer	May 15, 2019	#1 Oricon Japan Single Chart
KAT-TUN LIVE TOUR 2018 CAST	KAT-TUN	Johnny's Entertainment, Japan	Lyrics, Composer, Arranger	April 17, 2019	#1 Oricon Japan DVD Chart
Yuri!!! on Concert	Jovette Rivera	avex Pictures Inc., Japan	Singer「Intoxicated」「History Maker」	February 15, 2019	#4 Oricon Japan Album Chart
CAST	KAT-TUN	Johnny's Entertainment, Japan	Lyrics, Composer, Arranger	July 18, 2018	#1 Oricon Japan Album Chart
JIN AKANISHI LIVE 2017 in YOYOGI ～Résumé～ DVD	Jin Akanishi	Go Good Records, Japan	Composer, Arranger	September 6, 2017	#3 Oricon Japan DVD Chart
Oh! Suketora!!! Yuri!!! on ICE	Jovette Rivera	avex Pictures Inc., Japan	Singer「Intoxicated」	December 21, 2016	#3 Oricon Japan Album Chart
Rejet Sound Collection vol.3 「MY LINK」	Jovette Rivera	Rejet, Japan	Singer「Escape Into The Night」	November 23, 2016	-
Welcome to Sexy Zone Tour [DVD/BD]	Sexy Zone	Johnny's Entertainment, Japan	Composer	September 7, 2016	#1 Oricon Japan DVD Chart
KAT-TUN 10TH ANNIVERSARY LIVE TOUR "10Ks!"	KAT-TUN	Johnny's Entertainment, Japan	Lyrics, Composer, Arranger	August 17, 2016	#1 Oricon Japan DVD Chart
KAT-TUN 10TH ANNIVERSARY BEST “10Ks!”	KAT-TUN	Johnny's Entertainment, Japan	Lyrics, Composer, Arranger	March 22, 2016	#1 Oricon Japan Album Chart
Welcome to Sexy Zone	Sexy Zone	Johnny's Entertainment, Japan	Composer	February 24, 2016	#1 Oricon Japan Album Chart
KAT-TUN LIVE 2015 “quarter" in TOKYO DOME	KAT-TUN	Johnny's Entertainment, Japan	Lyrics, Composer, Arranger	October 14, 2015	#1 Oricon Japan DVD Chart
Rejet Sound Collection vol.2 「LOVE GEYSER」	Jovette Rivera	Rejet, Japan	Singer「Night Shade」	September 30, 2015	-
JOKER GAME	KAT-TUN	Johnny's Entertainment, Japan	Main Theme Lyrics, Composer, Arranger	August 12, 2015	#1 Oricon Japan Movie DVD Chart
"JINDEPENDENCE" Tour 2014 DVD	Jin Akanishi	Go Good Records, Japan	Composer, Arranger	August 12, 2015	#1 Oricon Japan DVD Chart
KAT-TUN LIVE TOUR 2014 come Here	KAT-TUN	Johnny's Entertainment, Japan	Composer	April 22, 2015	#1 Oricon Japan DVD Chart
Dead or Alive	KAT-TUN	Johnny's Entertainment, Japan	Lyrics, Composer, Arranger	January 21, 2015	#1 Oricon Japan Single Chart
KAT-TUN Countdown Live 2013 DVD	KAT-TUN	Johnny's Entertainment, Japan	Composer	May 14, 2014	#1 Oricon Japan DVD Chart
My Dear	Lee Joon-gi	IMX, Japan	Lyrics, Composer	January 9, 2014	#1 Oricon Album Chart
My Dear	Lee Joon-gi	IMX, Korea,	Lyrics, Composer	December 11, 2013	-
JAPONICANA TOUR 2012 IN USA DVD	Jin Akanishi	WARNER MUSIC, Japan	Composer, Arranger	September 25, 2013	#2 Oricon Japan DVD Chart
JG Time With You... In Japan	Lee Joon-gi	IMX, Korea, Japan	Lyrics, Composer, Arranger	May 28, 2013	-
SEXY ZONE ARENA CONCERT 2012	SEXY ZONE	PONY CANYON, Japan	Composer	August 15, 2012	#1 Oricon Japan DVD Chart
Reunion JG - Return of the King DVD	Lee Joon-gi	IMX, Korea, Japan	Lyrics, Composer, Arranger	April 17, 2012	-
SHE! HER! HER!	Kis-My-Ft2	Johnny's Entertainment, Japan	Composer	March 21, 2012	#1 Oricon Japan Single Chart
JAPONICANA	Jin Akanishi	WARNER MUSIC, Japan	Composer, Arranger	March 7, 2012	#1 Oricon Japan Album Chart #2 iTunes Dance Chart #10 Billboard Dance Chart
Yellow Gold Tour 3011 DVD	Jin Akanishi	WARNER MUSIC, Japan	Composer, Arranger	May 4, 2011	#1 Oricon Japan DVD Chart
J-Style - 1st Japan Album	Lee Joon-gi	SONY, Japan	Lyrics, Composer, Arranger	January 27, 2010	-
Break the Records Live DVD	KAT-TUN	Johnny's Entertainment, Japan	Composer	December 16, 2009	#1 Oricon Japan DVD Chart
Playzone 2009 DVD	Uchi Hiroki and Question?	Johnny's Entertainment, Japan	Composer, Arranger	December 2, 2009	#1 Oricon Japan DVD Chart
Break The Records ~by you and for you~	KAT-TUN	Johnny's Entertainment, Japan	Composer	April 29, 2009	#1 Oricon Japan Album Chart
Wadaya（わだ家）	Wada Akiko	Teichiku Entertainment, Japan	Composer, Arranger	April 23, 2008	-
Takizawa Enbujo 2007	Ya-Ya-Yah	Johnny's Entertainment, Japan	Composer, Arranger	July 18, 2007	-

== Television, game and commercial songs (released) ==
Song (Title)	Company (TV Show/Game)	Role	Release
FORSAKEN (Biohazard)	Biohazard Village Pachislot, Japan	Singer, Lyrics	January 2024
Follow Your Dream (Sint-Truidense V.V.)	Nishitani Clinic, Japan	Singer, Lyrics	June 2022
Thank You (TV Ending Theme)	Eigo de Asobo, Japan	Singer	February 2021
Rare Drop☆KOI☆KOI! (English ver.) (PSO2)	Phantasy Star Online 2, Worldwide	Rapper, MC Voice Acting (as Ichitaro Ai)	August 2020
FIREPROOF (Biohazard)	Biohazard Into The Panic Pachislot, Japan	Singer, Lyrics	November 2018
Devil Moon (Devil May Cry 4)	Devil May Cry 4 Pachinko, Japan	Singer, Lyrics	August 2018
Hold Me Down (Street Fighter V)	Street Fighter V Pachislot Edition, Japan	Singer	July 2018
Buddy Funny Days (Anime) Ending Theme	Future Card BuddyFight ACE, Worldwide	English lyrics	June 2018
Gift from The Fight!! (Anime) Ending Theme	Cardfight!! Vanguard, Worldwide	Singer, English lyrics	May 2018
Black Blood Destiny (Tekken 3rd)	Tekken 7, Worldwide	Singer	June 2017
EXODUS (Anime Drama Game)	Criminale! X, Japan	Singer	October 2016
Escape into the Night (Anime Drama Game)	Criminale! F, Japan	Singer	October 2015
Buddy Lights (Anime) Ending Theme	Future Card BuddyFight 100, Worldwide	Singer, English lyrics	April 2015
Luminize (Anime) Opening Theme	Future Card Buddyfight 100, Worldwide	English Lyrics	April 2015
NIGHTSHADE (Anime Drama Game)	Criminale!, Japan	Singer	August 2014
Your Pain is not My Pain (Pachinko Slot)	Virtua Fighter Pachislot, Japan	Singer, Lyrics	August 2014
Black Blood Destiny (Pachinko Slot)	Tekken 3rd, Japan	Singer	July 2014
VICTORY (Anime) Opening Theme	B-Daman Crossfire, USA	Singer	September 2013
HOPE (Anime) Ending Theme	B-Daman Crossfire, USA	Singer	September 2013
Janbo Souhounten (CM)	Janbo Souhounten, Japan	Composer, Singer, Arranger	2009
Eien Ga Mieru Basho (TV Show Opening Theme)	Gokinjo no Soko Jikara, Japan	Composer, Arranger	2008
ENDLESS (CM)	Vana H. Water Co., Japan	Composer	2007

== Acting / voice acting ==
Title (TV Show/Game)	Company, Region	Role	Release / On Air
Ace Attorney Investigations Collection (Switch, PS4, XBOX, PC)	Capcom, Japan	Simeon Saint	Sept 6, 2024
Tekken 8 (PS5, XBOX, PC)	Bandai Namco, Japan	Various Character VA	Jan 26, 2024
Battle Spirits Saga (Online Tutorial)	Bandai Namco, Japan	Tutorial VA	Nov 23, 2022
Bandai Namco "Fun For All" (TVCM)	Bandai Namco, Japan	Narration VA	2022
Studysapuri (TVCM)	スタディサプリ, Japan	Actor	2021
Rare Drop Koi Koi Phantasy Star Online 2	SEGA, Worldwide	Character VA	August 2020
Line Brown Farm (Mobile Game, IOS, Android)	LINE Corporation, Worldwide	Various Characters	2017
Sekai Ichi Muzukashii Koi 世界一難しい恋 (TV Drama)	Nippon TV, Japan	Jack ジャック	May 11, 2016
Pokkén Tournament (Nintendo Wii U)	Nintendo, Worldwide	Nicholas	March 18, 2016
Honda Presentation Video	Honda, Japan	Narrator	-
Sony Vaio Tutorial Guide	SONY, Japan	Narrator	-

== Video game remixes (released) ==
Game	Original Song Title	Remix Song Title	Original Composer Credit	Album title (if applicable)	Release
Seiken Densetsu 3	Angel's Fear (Main Melody)	The Fearless Angel	Hiroki Kikuta	Seiken Densetsu 3: Songs of Light and Darkness	Oct. 1, 2018
Seiken Densetsu 3	Can You Fly Sister?	Sora no Neechan	Hiroki Kikuta	Seiken Densetsu 3: Songs of Light and Darkness	Oct. 1, 2018
Final Fantasy IX	Melodies of Life	The Final Melody	Nobuo Uematsu, Shirō Hamaguchi	Final Fantasy IX: World's Apart	Sept. 9, 2015
Final Fantasy VI	Terra	The 6th Kingdom	Nobuo Uematsu	Final Fantasy VI: Balance and Ruin	July 1, 2013
Wild Arms	To the End of the Wilderness ~To a New Journey~	The Eternal Journey	Michiko Naruke	Wild Arms: ARMed and DANGerous	Dec. 20 2012
Final Fantasy VII	Cid's Theme	The Crossroads	Nobuo Uematsu	Final Fantasy VII: Voices of the Lifestream	Sept. 14 2007
Castlevania II: Simon's Quest	The Silence of the Daylight	Simon's Symphony	Kenichi Matsubara, S. Terashima	-	March 5, 2003
Wild Arms	Courage	Dové L'Amore'	Michiko Naruke	-	Nov. 13 2002
Wizards & Warriors	Title	Kono Sekai De	David Wise	-	Sept. 30 2002
Final Fantasy VI	Terra	Eres des Points	Nobuo Uematsu	-	Aug. 24 2002
