= Iroduku: The World in Colors =

Japanese anime time travel television series

- Promotional art for the series

色づく世界の明日から (Irozuku Sekai no Ashita kara)
- Genre: Time travel
- Created by: Natsuka Yashio
- Anime television series
- Directed by: Toshiya Shinohara
- Produced by: Hiroshi Kawamura; Mitsutoshi Ogura; Toshihiro Maeda; Fuminori Yamazaki; Tsuyoshi Aida; Yūichi Izumi; Mitsuhito Tsuji; Yutaka Kashiwagi; Hiroyuki Aoi; Shōta Tanaka
- Written by: Yūko Kakihara
- Music by: Yoshiaki Dewa
- Studio: P.A. Works
- Licensed by: NA: Sentai Filmworks; UK: MVM Films; SA/SEA: Muse Communication
- Original network: MBS, TBS, BS-TBS, AT-X, TUT, ATV
- Original run: October 6, 2018 – December 29, 2018
- Episodes: 13
- icon

Iroduku: The World in Colors (Japanese: 色づく世界の明日から, Hepburn: Irozuku Sekai no Ashita kara; lit. "From the Color-Changing World's Tomorrow") is a 13-episode Japanese anime television series by studio P.A. Works. It aired from October 6 to December 29, 2018, on the Animeism block.

== Plot ==
In 2078, Hitomi Tsukishiro is a teenage girl from a family of witches who lost her sense of colors as she lost the people she treasured. Not wanting to see her granddaughter suffer anymore, Hitomi's grandmother Kohaku Tsukishiro sends her 60 years into the past to 2018 to meet her 17-year-old self.

== Characters ==
Hitomi Tsukishiro (月白 瞳美, Tsukishiro Hitomi)
Voiced by: Kaori Ishihara (Japanese); Alyssa Marek (English)
A colorblind girl who descends from a family of mages. Despite being a mage herself, she hates magic. As she gets older, she lost her senses of colors as well as "people around her". She is transported back in time 60 years in the past by her grandmother Kohaku. There, she meets a younger Kohaku and makes new friends. She develops feelings for Yuito and learns the meaning of love.
Kohaku Tsukishiro (月白 琥珀, Tsukishiro Kohaku)
Voiced by: Kaede Hondo, Sumi Shimamoto (old woman) (Japanese); Cat Thomas, Wendy Powell (old woman) (English)
Kohaku is Hitomi's grandmother who sent Hitomi to live with her 17-year-old self. Kohaku is a troublemaker girl who often does experiments with her magic at school, causing a fear of magic among her classmates. She is initially abroad when Hitomi arrives in the past, and joins the Magic Photography Arts Club after she returned. She works very hard to perfect the time magic to send Hitomi back to her time. She finds happiness by doing magic which make people happy.
Yuito Aoi (葵 唯翔, Aoi Yuito)
Voiced by: Shōya Chiba (Japanese); Nathan Wilson (English)
A member of the Magic Photography Arts Club whose hobby is drawing. For some reason, Hitomi can see the colors in his drawings. He is an introvert and finds himself similar to Hitomi. He eventually falls in love with her and helps her go back to her time. After Hitomi returns to the future, he eventually writes and illustrates the picture book Hitomi reads as a child.
Asagi Kazeno (風野 あさぎ, Kazeno Asagi)
Voiced by: Kana Ichinose (Japanese); Brittney Karbowski (English)
A member of the Magic Photography Arts Club who likes to taking photos of rabbits. She has crush on her childhood friend Shō.
Kurumi Kawai (川合 胡桃, Kawai Kurumi)
Voiced by: Nao Tōyama (Japanese); Allison Sumrall (English)
Vice president of the Magic Photography Arts Club. She was the first to notice and take a video of Hitomi slipping out of Yuito's room and is insistent Hitomi is in a relationship with him or he may have been about to force himself on her. She was also responsible for uploading the video to social media. She is a fun loving cheerful girl. She admires her elder sister the most and wants to be like her.
Shō Yamabuki (山吹 将, Yamabuki Shō)
Voiced by: Seiji Maeda (Japanese); Adam Gibbs (English)
President of the Magic Photography Arts Club who focuses in taking grayscale pictures. Skeptical of the alleged relationship between Hitomi and Yuito, he was the first to approach and check on her upon noticing Hitomi looked lost and out of place. The high regard he has for Hitomi makes Asagi jealous. He eventually confesses to Hitomi but gets turned down. He takes the rejection very well and continues to support her.
Chigusa Fukasawa (深澤 千草, Fukazawa Chigusa)
Voiced by: Ayumu Murase (Japanese); James Marler (English)
A first year and youngest member of the Magic Photography Arts Club. He is very friendly and especially with Kurumi. They are always bickering with each other.

== Production and release ==
The 13-episode anime television series is animated by studio P.A. Works, directed by Toshiya Shinohara, written by Yuuko Kakihara, with character designs by Fly. Yuki Akiyama serves as chief animation director and is adapting the character designs for animation. Kurumi Suzuki is the series' art director, and Junichi Higashi is the art supervisor. Tomo Namiki and Yoshimitsu Tomita are the directors of photography. Naomi Nakano is the color designer, Tachi Kiritani is the CG director, and Yō Yamada is the sound director. Infinite serves as producer for the project. The series' music is composed by Yoshiaki Dewa. The anime aired from October 6 to December 29, 2018 (Note: The series is listed to premiere on October 5 at 25:55, which is the same as October 6 at 1:55 a.m.) and was broadcast on the Animeism programming block on MBS, TBS, BS-TBS, AT-X, TUT, and ATV. It was streamed exclusively on Amazon Video worldwide except in China until December 29, 2021, when Hidive began streaming the series on its service worldwide (except for Asia). The opening theme song is "17-sai" (17才, Jū-nana-sai; "17-years-old") by Haruka to Miyuki, and the ending theme song is "Mimei no Kimi to Hakumei no Mahō" (未明の君と薄明の魔法) by Nagi Yanagi.

In August 2021, Sentai Filmworks announced the acquisition of the series for home video and digital release in North America. The English dub premiered on Hidive on June 19, 2022.

No.	Title (Note: All English titles are taken from Amazon Video.)	Original air date
1	"Where You Belong"; Transliteration: "Kimi no Ikubeki Tokoro" (Japanese: キミノイクベキトコロ)	October 6, 2018
Hitomi Tsukishiro, a teenage girl born into a family of mages, has lost her sense of colors mysteriously, becoming placid and socially withdrawn. Her grandmother, Kohaku, decides to use magic to transport Hitomi back in time to meet her 17-year-old self, in hopes to end her granddaughter's suffering. The magic brings Hitomi 60 years back to 2018, and right smack into the room of a boy, where she promptly escapes from the window. However, this is caught on video by three members of the Photography & Arts Club at Minamigaoka High School, Hitomi's own school in the future, and subsequently uploaded on the Internet. The three students later encounter Hitomi lost in the streets and offer to help her find the magic shop in town. Introducing themselves, Asagi Kanezo, Kurumi Kawai, and Shō Yamabuki, who falsely believing Hitomi is Yuito Aoi's girlfriend after she was seen climbing out from his window. Guided to the magic shop, Hitomi finds her grandmother had left for England to study magic, and is met with her great, great, grandmother instead, who generously provides her food and lodging. Hitomi decides to show her an azurite earring Kohaku gave her back in the future to prove her relationship to their lineage, but discovers she dropped it by accident when she was hiding under Aoi's bed.
2	"I Can't Stand Magic"; Transliteration: "Mahō Nante Daikirai" (Japanese: 魔法なんて大キライ)	October 13, 2018
Hitomi follows Aoi as he heads out the next day, finally stopping at a park where he begins drawing. To her surprise, she can see the colors in his art, which seemingly comes to life and she unexpectedly reveals herself to him. Aoi questions her about the video and she fumbles around to explain magic caused it, making herself out to be a mage, and requests to hear more about the drawing but he leaves. Returning to the magic shop, Kohaku's family decides to enroll Hitomi in school, wishing to let her continue to live a life despite having traveled from the future, and before she knows it she's in Minamigaoka and reunited with the members of the Photography & Arts Club, including Aoi, with Asagi and Kohaku, who is scheduled to return soon, in the same class as her. In the middle of the hallway, Aoi requests Hitomi show him some magic to quell the rumours she is his girlfriend. Although she produces a sparkle of stars from her hands, Hitomi is reminded of her dislike of magic. Despite the poor quality of her magic, Aoi wishes to see it one more time in the future, and in return lets her look at his drawing again. Glad her magic could make someone happy, Yamabuki witnesses her practicing magic late at night on school grounds, creating a shower of stars.
3	"No Rain, No Rainbow"	October 20, 2018
Minamigaoka's various clubs start organizing a presentation-cum-fair to recruit first-years to join. Due to being a transfer student, Hitomi is encouraged to take a look around and she enters the clubroom of the Photography & Arts Club, which is revealed to have merged due to Aoi being the only member in the art section and the photography section short on members. Aoi first introduces Hitomi to the art section after she wishes to try both sides out, giving her a chance to do some free-hand drawing. However, due to her lack of ability to see the colors, she ends up painting a very bold and colorful painting of stuffed rabbits which Aoi finds extremely interesting. Later, the others introduce Hitomi to the photography section through a hands-on session, but when the drama club's presentation is pushed forward, Yamabuki has to go take photos, leaving the organizing shorthanded and Hitomi is roped in to be a model. With a dry ice effect on the pool, she is instructed to use blue starsand, which is sold at the magic shop for non-mages to create magic, to walk on water and the new members are challenged to take a mysterious-looking photo with their cameras. Once again, Hitomi's lack of ability to see colors makes her use the wrong sand which causes snow to fall instead, but despite she is able to walk on water until Kurumi calls out to her in worry, making her lose concentration and fall into the water. These two incidents let Aoi realize Hitomi is unable to see colors and she begs him not to tell anyone, apologizing for what happened today and thanking him for letting her remember colors through his drawings.
4	"Stop Calling Me Granny!"; Transliteration: "Obaachan wa Yamete!" (Japanese: おばあちゃんはヤメテ!)	October 27, 2018
Hitomi decides to join the Photography & Arts Club. Kohaku finally returns from England by ship and uses her magic to create an illusion of her school in London using some photos, but an oncoming train accidentally causes dust from the engine to fall all over everyone and the teacher. After school though, Kohaku informs Hitomi the train was caused by her instead, and suspects she has a dormant power within her. For club activities the next day, Hitomi, accompanied by Kohaku, goes to the school roof with everyone to take photos of the night skyline, wanting to create a new kind of theme for a more interesting presentation combining both photography and art for the upcoming Cultural Festival. As first-year student Chisuga Fukasawa stays behind with Kurumi after telling her some ghost stories and scaring her. The rest proceed to the roof where in the midst of work, Yamabuki decides to distinguish between the two members of the Tsukishiro family by calling them via their first names, but Aoi decides to only call Kohaku by her first name for a distinction. After the photo shoot, Hitomi gathers up the courage to tell everyone she is actually from the future, with Kohaku being her grandmother. The two use magic to make a train in the sky and they all return home after taking these satisfying shots.
5	"A Modest Recipe"; Transliteration: "Sasayaka na Reshipi" (Japanese: ささやかなレシピ)	November 3, 2018
Kohaku joins the Photography & Arts Club as a way of merging the Magic Club which she disbanded accidentally some time back, changing its name to the Magic Photography Arts Club. Asagi struggles with her one-sided feelings for Yamabuki, especially after a fortune-telling told her romantic luck to be at its worst with an eminent arrival of a rival, Hitomi constantly practices with her magic to achieve satisfactory results after seeing how it made Aoi happy, and Aoi is having difficulty expressing his thoughts through art after opting to go job-hunting instead of pursuing art school. Later during the week, Kohaku holds a pep-rally-slash-potluck-party at the Tsukishiro residence, and purposely creates a chance for Aoi and Hitomi to be alone for Hitomi to gift Aoi her personally handmade starsand for him to have a change of pace when having blocks in the middle of drawing. However, Asagi gets jealous when Yamabuki states how watching Hitomi try her best at everything she does makes him want to do the same, but some encouragement from Kohaku gives her the resolve to change for the better as well. Asagi decides to try her hand at making postcards using her rabbit-themed photographs with Yamabuki's help, remembering how they used to be childhood friends, and decides to store away her feelings for now. After the party, Aoi uses the sand after turning off the lights and is bathed in a glow of stars, along with a golden fish jumping into his drawing device.
6	"Golden Fish"; Transliteration: "Kin'iro no Sakana" (Japanese: 金色のサカナ)	November 10, 2018
Aoi tells Hitomi about the golden fish that appeared, recalling how it was featured in some of his drawings before, but its first appearance was in an art competition in elementary school where he won first place with it. Having known Aoi since elementary school, Yamabuki shows Hitomi a photo of it, but this unexpectedly gets Asagi jealous again after seeing the two walk together and she determines to make him see her as a woman. The next day, Kurumi holds a photo shoot where everyone dresses up in formal wear and take photos outside, but Hitomi accidentally wanders into Aoi's drawing. There, amidst a colorful scenery of a sky nightline reflected in the water where the golden fish swims, she continues deeper until the scenery suddenly changes past a series of clouds to a deserted wasteland. The surrounding architecture have been buried as well as a huge golden fish being caught dead in a net. Hitomi also witnesses a shadowy figure attempting to capture a smaller, golden fish and rushes to stop him, only to wake up on the bench in the real world after having supposedly collapsed. However, when questioned about it, Aoi snaps at Hitomi and this causes friction between the two, who avoid each other until they accidentally bump into each other: Aoi having just finished looking at an exhibition set up by his friend and Hitomi on her way home with Kohaku. Running away from him, Aoi chases her to the bus stop and promises her that he will let her see his latest work once he's done, reawakening the golden fish and Hitomi realises that her sense of colors is suddenly back.
7	"The Burden of Venus"; Transliteration: "Vīnasu no Omoni" (Japanese: ヴィーナスの重荷)	November 17, 2018
The next day however, Hitomi's sense of colors is gone again. As the third-years Yamabuki and Kurumi prep for exams, they entrust summer break camp planning to the next president Asagi and vice-president Hitomi. However, Chisuga accidentally brings up Kurumi's older sister, who works as a famous pastry chef in a shop called Multique Roll, which triggers Kurumi's inferiority complex against her. When Hitomi hesitantly worries for her, Kurumi tells Hitomi that Yamabuki wants to pursue photography at university while Aoi is aiming for a national university like her as well, possibly to pursue art, confessing that they have the same motivation and passion like her sister that she lacks. Kurumi requests that Hitomi keep this conversation between them but Chisuga overhears it and shows her the various photos that he had taken of her during club activities, encouraging her that she'll find things she loves for sure in the future. Kurumi decides that photography is her first priority for now and resolves to work hard for it. Later, Aoi shows Hitomi a new piece of a human hand reaching out to a scenery of transparent globes filled with colorful objects, which awakens her lost yearning for seeing colors. While viewing the night skyline, Hitomi decides to come clean about her lack of ability to see colors.
8	"Fragile Fragments"; Transliteration: "Hokorobi no Kakera" (Japanese: ほころびのカケラ)	November 24, 2018
Kohaku theorizes that Hitomi unconsciously used magic on herself that resulted in her monochromatic world, and has Aoi do all sorts of embarrassing experiments with Hitomi to try and get a hint on how she can break the spell, such as calling him by his first name and having them come close to each other. These experiments prove to be a huge failure though and Kohaku resolves to practise time magic to bring Hitomi back to her original time. However, the club members feel a sense of sadness remembering Hitomi's imminent departure. Hitomi herself, is unwilling to go back.
9	"Wandering Words"; Transliteration: "Samayou Kotoba" (Japanese: さまよう言葉)	December 1, 2018
Yamabuki decides to take Hitomi around per her request to take photos of the city in this era, confessing to her afterwards and making her run away in a panic. Hitomi asks Kohaku for advice the next day while constantly avoiding Yamabuki and skipping out on club activities. Asagi also begins to get wind that something is up and tells Hitomi that she should give the confessor a proper answer, which Hitomi does the following day. However, Asagi soon realises what's going on and tells Hitomi upfront that she likes Yamabuki, and she always has for a long time since they were childhood friends, before running away.
10	"Monochromatic Crayon"; Transliteration: "Monokuro no Kureyon" (Japanese: モノクロのクレヨン)	December 8, 2018
Asagi and Hitomi reconcile eating parfaits together. For the next round of club activities, Kohaku decides to use magic to bring the students coming to see the Photography & Arts Club's anthologies into the photos and pictures, but halfway back home reveals to Hitomi that she'll be the one casting the magic instead. Wanting to let everyone experience the same bright and colorful scenes, Hitomi practises relentlessly during club and back at home with paper aeroplanes and Kohaku's photos of England. After having mastered the magic to last for 3 minutes, the club members enter one of Aoi's drawings depicting a fantasy world, where Aoi and Hitomi encounter the golden fish once again. The two follow it into the darkness but Aoi soon realises that Hitomi is missing, with a statue of her turned into stone in front of him next to a heavy bamboo door. Upon opening it, he witnesses a young Hitomi drawing with monochromatic colors a river dividing a crying princess and queen, which he attempts to brighten up by drawing a boat, a bird and later a rainbow bridge for the princess to cross, but Hitomi rejects them all. Returning to the present, Hitomi decides to tell Aoi about her past: her mother was the first of the Tsukishiro kind to be unable to use magic, instead giving birth to a daughter who could. One day, her mother left and from there Hitomi always believed that it was a punishment for her to be happy with her ability but being unable to notice her mother's sorrow and make her happy again, therefore believing that magic was something that tore at their relationship and leading to its hatred.
11	"The Waning Moon"; Transliteration: "Kaketeiku Tsuki" (Japanese: 欠けていく月)	December 15, 2018
Aoi walks her home after Hitomi bursts into tears. The next few days bring intense preparation for the Magic Photography Arts Club, but while cleaning up Hitomi suddenly disappears only to reappear again, remarking as if time stopped for a moment and arousing Kohaku's worries. Kohaku mails Professor Uttley from her magic school at England, discovering that time magic is not permanent, and that because Hitomi's presence is an anomaly it will definitely cause divergences in the course of the past, creating inevitable "time gaps" where the person or object in question can stand to remain stuck there should it stay for too long. With her teenage self still lacking in magical power, Kohaku requests that Hitomi collaborate with her to send her back to her original time and desperately tries to find the purest high-quality starsand as possible, enlisting the help of everyone else in the club. Meanwhile, Hitomi struggles with her lack of motivation on returning home and starts disappearing more frequently. Kohaku decides that Hitomi will depart in two days on the night of the Cultural Festival, where a new moon will appear to maximise the powers of the starsand. That night, Hitomi sends a paper aeroplane to Aoi at night and they embrace each other after meeting up, confirming their feelings for each other.
12	"On the Bright, Shining Day"; Transliteration: "Hikaru Hikaru Kono Ichinichi ga Hikaru" (Japanese: 光る光るこの一日が光る)	December 22, 2018
Hitomi has a talk with Aoi, who promises her that he's glad he met her and Hitomi works up her determination to investigate the reason she was brought back to this time period. The next day, everyone attends the festival and has a great time, while at night Kohaku's family throw a feast to wish her goodbye. The second day of the Cultural Festival reminds Asagi of Hitomi's last day and she convinces Yamabuki to let Aoi and her have some alone time exploring the festival together, but Aoi hesitates to properly confess. That night, all the students have an after-party where Kohaku and Hitomi conjure some magical fireworks. In her extreme happiness, Hitomi realises that once again, she has regained her sense of colors, but likewise only for that brief moment. Everyone then heads to the park after a satisfying day, their sadness returning as Kohaku prepares to send Hitomi back to the future.
13	"The World in Colors"; Transliteration: "Irozuku Sekai no Ashita kara" (Japanese: 色づく世界の明日から)	December 29, 2018
The club members leave their own starsand trails for Hitomi to combine the magic. As there is still a little time left before the moon completely matures, each member decides to leave her their own personal messages: Yamabuki wishes for her to have more confidence in herself, Chigusa wishes for her to smile more, Kurumi thanks her for joining the club, Asagi promises to write her letters dated to the future, Kohaku gives her her love, and Aoi wishes her all the best in the future and promises never to forget her. Hitomi also announces about how much she has changed since coming here and thanking them for all these irreplaceable feelings and memories. In the midst of her announcement though, Hitomi's magic interferes, breaking the time magic. Aoi jumps into the magic circle to save her but they return to Hitomi's room of monochromatic drawings. The two finally confess their feelings after realising that they had always been similar in shutting themselves up away from their own emotions, and embrace each other. For them who had both brought color into the other's future, Hitomi regains her sense of colors and they are successfully transported back to the present. Hitomi has returned to the future just as everyone wishes her goodbye, but only Kohaku knows that the time magic she cast didn't do the trick, instead Hitomi's own unconscious erasure of colors from her vision was the limit that had broken the time magic Kohaku's future self cast. Back in 2078, an old Kohaku gives Hitomi a time capsule everyone made using their photography skills, but she is especially touched by a picture book called "The Seven-Colored Penguin" that was the only book she read in color as a child, revealed to be written by Aoi himself and detailing the change of a monochromatic penguin (Hitomi) to a colorful one with the help of a rabbit (Asagi), a flying squirrel (Kurumi), a bear (Aoi), a dog (Yamabuki), a cat (Chigusa), and a parrot (Kohaku). Hitomi, having regained the people and emotions she lost as a child, returns to her life with renewed vigour and joy. She then visits Aoi's grave and puts flowers on his grave, while crying. Moreover, she realizes that she has understood the true meaning of life, thanks to him.

== See also ==
- Bottom-tier Character Tomozaki, a light novel series illustrated by Fly
- The Girl I Saved on the Train Turned Out to Be My Childhood Friend, another light novel series illustrated by Fly
- Chasing After Aoi Koshiba, a manga series illustrated by Fly
