= Akira Itō (artist) =

Japanese manga artist

Akira Ito
- 伊藤 彰
- Born: Japan
- Occupation: Manga artist

Akira Ito (伊藤 彰, Itō Akira) is a manga artist. Ito drew Yu-Gi-Oh! R while the creator of the Yu-Gi-Oh! franchise, Kazuki Takahashi, came up with the storyline. Ito's drawing style is similar to Takahashi's. Ito later co-created Cardfight!! Vanguard in collaboration with Satoshi Nakamura (Duel Masters) and Bushiroad president Takaaki Kidani.

Ito worked as a staff member for the Yu-Gi-Oh! manga.
