= Cardfight!! Vanguard =

Japanese media franchise

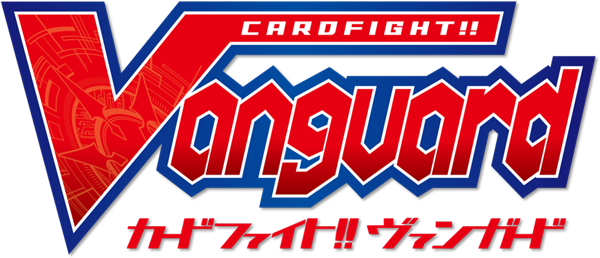
- Logo

カードファイト!! ヴァンガード (Kādofaito!! Vangādo)
- Created by: Bushiroad; Akira Itō
- Anime television series
- Directed by: Hatsuki Tsuji
- Produced by: Atsuyuki Takada; Hayato Saga; Ryōta Katō; Shigeru Saitō; Shigeto Nihei
- Written by: Tatsuhiko Urahata
- Music by: Takayuki Negishi
- Studio: TMS Entertainment; Studio Sakimakura (#34–65)
- Original network: TXN (TV Aichi, TV Tokyo), AT-X
- English network: SEA: Animax Asia
- Original run: January 8, 2011 – March 31, 2012
- Episodes: 65
Further information
Manga
Written by	Akira Itō
Published by	Kadokawa Shoten
English publisher	Vertical
Magazine	Kerokero Ace, Monthly Bushiroad
Original run	November 26, 2010 – April 8, 2017
Volumes	12
Anime television series
Cardfight!! Vanguard: Asia Circuit
Directed by	Hatsuki Tsuji
Produced by	Atsuyuki Takada; Hayato Saga; Ryōta Katō; Shigeru Saitō; Shigeto Nihei
Written by	Tatsuhiko Urahata
Music by	Takayuki Negishi
Studio	TMS Entertainment
Original network	TXN (TV Tokyo), AT-X
English network	SEA: Animax Asia
Original run	April 8, 2012 – January 2, 2013
Episodes	39
Anime television series
Cardfight!! Vanguard: Link Joker
Directed by	Hatsuki Tsuji
Produced by	Atsuyuki Takada; Hayato Saga; Ryōta Katō; Shigeru Saitō; Shigeto Nihei
Written by	Tatsuhiko Urahata
Music by	Takayuki Negishi
Studio	TMS Entertainment
Original network	TXN (TV Tokyo), AT-X
English network	SEA: Animax Asia
Original run	January 13, 2013 – March 2, 2014
Episodes	59
Manga
Mini Vanguard
Written by	Quily
Published by	Kadokawa Shoten
Magazine	Kerokero Ace, Monthly Bushiroad
Original run	September 2013 – present
Volumes	7
Anime television series
Mini Vanguard
Studio	DLE
Original run	April 6, 2013 – December 14, 2013
Episodes	37
Anime television series
Cardfight!! Vanguard: Legion Mate
Directed by	Hatsuki Tsuji
Produced by	Atsuyuki Takada; Hayato Saga; Ryōta Katō; Shigeru Saitō; Shigeto Nihei
Written by	Tatsuhiko Urahata
Music by	Takayuki Negishi
Studio	TMS Entertainment
Original network	TXN (TV Tokyo), AT-X
Original run	March 9, 2014 – October 19, 2014
Episodes	33
Anime film
Cardfight!! Vanguard: The Movie (2014)
Anime television series
Cardfight!! Vanguard G
Directed by	Yui Umemoto
Produced by	Atsuyuki Takada; Hayato Saga; Ryōta Katō; Shigeru Saitō; Shigeto Nihei
Written by	Kiyoko Yoshimura
Music by	Mamoru Mori
Studio	TMS/Double Eagle
Original network	TXN (TV Tokyo), AT-X
English network	AU: 10 Peach
Original run	October 26, 2014 – October 4, 2015
Episodes	48
Anime television series
Cardfight!! Vanguard G: GIRS Crisis
Directed by	Yui Umemoto
Produced by	Atsuyuki Takada; Hayato Saga; Ryōta Katō; Shigeru Saitō; Shigeto Nihei
Written by	Kiyoko Yoshimura
Music by	Mamoru Mori
Studio	TMS/Double Eagle
Original network	TXN (TV Tokyo), AT-X
English network	AU: 10 Peach
Original run	October 11, 2015 – April 10, 2016
Episodes	26
Anime television series
Cardfight!! Vanguard G: Stride Gate
Directed by	Yui Umemoto
Written by	Kiyoko Yoshimura
Music by	Mamoru Mori
Studio	TMS/Double Eagle
Original network	TXN (TV Tokyo), AT-X
English network	AU: 10 Peach
Original run	April 17, 2016 – September 25, 2016
Episodes	24
Anime television series
Cardfight!! Vanguard G: NEXT
Directed by	Itsuro Kawasaki
Written by	Kiyoko Yoshimura
Music by	Mamoru Mori
Studio	OLM, Inc.
Original network	TXN (TV Tokyo), AT-X
English network	AU: 10 Peach
Original run	October 2, 2016 – October 1, 2017
Episodes	52
Anime television series
Cardfight!! Vanguard G: Z
Directed by	Nobuhiro Kondo
Written by	Kiyoko Yoshimura
Music by	Kazushi Miyakoda; Shigeru Yamamoto
Studio	OLM, Inc. Bridge
Original network	TXN (TV Tokyo), AT-X
Original run	October 8, 2017 – April 1, 2018
Episodes	24
Anime television series
Cardfight!! Vanguard Prime
Directed by	Itsuro Kawasaki
Written by	Masanao Akahoshi
Studio	OLM, Inc.
Original network	Tokyo MX, TV Aichi
English network	AU: 10 Peach
Original run	May 5, 2018 – May 4, 2019
Episodes	52
Anime television series
Cardfight!! Vanguard Prime: High School Arc Cont.
Directed by	Itsuro Kawasaki
Written by	Masanao Akahoshi
Studio	OLM, Inc.
Original network	TXN (TV Aichi, TV Tokyo)
Original run	May 11, 2019 – August 10, 2019
Episodes	14
Anime television series
Cardfight!! Vanguard Prime: Shinemon
Directed by	Itsuro Kawasaki
Written by	Masanao Akahoshi
Studio	OLM, Inc.
Original network	TXN (TV Aichi, TV Tokyo)
Original run	August 24, 2019 – March 28, 2020
Episodes	31
Anime television series
Cardfight!! Vanguard Gaiden if
Directed by	Itsuro Kawasaki
Written by	Masanao Akahoshi
Studio	OLM, Inc.
Original network	TXN (TV Aichi, TV Tokyo)
Original run	May 30, 2020 – November 28, 2020
Episodes	25
Anime television series
Cardfight!! Vanguard overDress
Directed by	Ken Mori
Written by	Ken Mori; Natsuko Takahashi
Music by	Hijiri Kuwano
Studio	Kinema Citrus; Gift-o'-Animation; Studio Jemi
Licensed by	Bushiroad: NA: Sentai Filmworks Crunchyroll (streaming) Funimation (streaming)
Original network	TXN (TV Aichi, TV Tokyo) (season 1); TV Aichi, TV Tokyo, TV Osaka (season 2)
Original run	April 3, 2021 – December 28, 2021
Episodes	12 (Season 1); 13 (Season 2)
Anime television series
Cardfight!! Vanguard will+Dress
Directed by	Ken Mori (chief); Ryūtarō Suzuki
Written by	Satoshi Nakamura
Music by	Hijiri Kuwano
Studio	Kinema Citrus; Gift-o'-Animation; Studio Jemi
Licensed by	Bushiroad: NA: Sentai Filmworks Crunchyroll (streaming); SEA: Plus Media Networks Asia (season 2)
Original network	TV Aichi, TV Tokyo, TV Osaka, BS TV Tokyo (season 1), BS NTV (season 2)
Original run	July 5, 2022 – October 7, 2023
Episodes	13 (Season 1); 12 (Season 2); 13 (Season 3)
Anime television series
Cardfight!! Vanguard DivineZ
Directed by	Taku Yamada
Produced by	Naoki Honda
Written by	Shun Menjou; Takahito Ōnishi
Music by	Hijiri Kuwano
Studio	Kinema Citrus; Gift-o'-Animation; Studio Jemi
Licensed by	Bushiroad: NA: Sentai Filmworks Crunchyroll (streaming); SEA: Plus Media Networks Asia
Original network	TXN (TV Aichi, TV Tokyo), BS NTV
Original run	January 13, 2024 – present
Episodes	13 (Season 1); 13 (Season 2); 13 (Deluxe Arc); 12 (Deluxe Finals); 12 (Parallactic Clash); 3 (Parallactic Fate)
Related series
Bermuda Triangle: Colorful Pastrale
icon

Cardfight!! Vanguard (Japanese: カードファイト!! ヴァンガード, Hepburn: Kādofaito!! Vangādo) is a Japanese multimedia franchise jointly created by Akira Itō, Satoshi Nakamura, Mitsuhisa Tamura, and Bushiroad president Takaaki Kidani. It currently consists of multiple anime television series, an official trading card game, multiple manga series, and an anime/live action film.

== Anime ==
In July 2010, an anime television series was commissioned by TMS Entertainment under the directorial supervision of Hatsuki Tsuji. The soundtrack was composed by Takayuki Negishi with character designs provided by Mari Tominaga. The series began airing in Japan on TV Aichi beginning on January 8, 2011, and was rebroadcast by the AT-X, TV Tokyo, TV Osaka, and TV Setouchi systems. The media-streaming website Crunchyroll simulcast the first season to the United States, Canada, the United Kingdom, and Ireland. Crunchyroll began streaming the second season to the United States, Canada, and the United Kingdom on June 30, 2012 and continues to stream the series. It was announced on November 17, 2013, that Hanabee Entertainment licensed the anime and released it on March 5, 2014, in Australia and New Zealand.

The series continued for three additional seasons: Cardfight!! Vanguard: Asia Circuit, which began airing on April 8, 2012; Cardfight!! Vanguard: Link Joker on January 13, 2013; and Cardfight!! Vanguard: Legion Mate on March 9, 2014. An anime/live action film was released on September 13, 2014, in Japan.

Cardfight!! Vanguard G ran from October 26, 2014, to October 5, 2015. It was followed by Cardfight!! Vanguard G: GIRS Crisis on October 11, 2015. Cardfight!! Vanguard G: Stride Gate aired from April 17, 2016, to September 25, 2016. It was followed by Cardfight!! Vanguard G: NEXT from October 2, 2016, to October 1, 2017, which is when OLM, Inc. started producing the series. It was followed by Cardfight!! Vanguard G: Z, which aired from October 8, 2017, to April 1, 2018. It is the last series in the original chronology as the next series Cardfight!! Vanguard (2018) is a reboot of the original series. The reboot started airing on May 5, 2018, and ended on May 4, 2019. It was followed by Cardfight!! Vanguard: High School Arc Cont. which aired from May 11, 2019, to August 10, 2019.

There was also a Bermuda Triangle spinoff series called Colorful Pastrale which aired from January 12, 2019, to March 30, 2019. A prequel series Cardfight!! Vanguard: Shinemon started airing on August 24, 2019. Cardfight!! Vanguard Gaiden if was originally scheduled to premiere on April 25, 2020. In April 2020, it was announced that the anime would be delayed until May 30 due to the COVID-19 pandemic.

A new anime series Cardfight!! Vanguard overDress produced by Kinema Citrus, Gift-o'-Animation, and Studio Jemi aired from April 3 to December 28, 2021. A third and fourth season has been announced. The sequel series Cardfight!! Vanguard will+Dress premiered on July 5, 2022. A second season started in January 2023, and a third season started in July 2023. The sequel series Cardfight!! Vanguard DivineZ started in January 2024. A second season started in July 2024, third season Cardfight!! Vanguard DivineZ Deluxe Arc started in January 2025, fourth season Cardfight!! Vanguard DivineZ Deluxe Finals started in July 2025, fifth season Cardfight!! Vanguard DivineZ Parallactic Clash started in January 2026 and final season Cardfight!! Vanguard DivineZ Parallactic Fate will air in November 2026. An anime adaptation of the spinoff manga Gal Meets Ghost will air on September 5, 2026. There will also be a new Vanguard anime that will be released in 2027 to celebrate the franchise's 15th anniversary.

=== Plot ===
==== Original era ====
Season 1

Aichi Sendou, the protagonist of the show, is a timid young boy in his third year of junior high school. The one thing that keeps him going is his trading card Blaster Blade from Cardfight!! Vanguard, a trading card game that takes place on a different planet called "Cray" and is popular throughout the world. Aichi's primary goal throughout the series is to become a stronger cardfighter. Aichi eventually places high enough at a local tournament to join with Kai, Misaki Tokura, and Kamui Katsuragi to form Team Quadrifoglio ("Q4" for short). Aichi's principal rival becomes Ren Suzugamori, a cardfighter who is the leader of the reigning national champion team. Ren eventually makes Aichi awaken a power that Ren also possesses: Psyqualia, a psychic-like ability that lets its user foresee victory in cardfights. When Aichi battles Ren at the finals of the national championships, it is revealed that Cray is real, and Psyqualia is the power given to those who will determine Cray's future. Aichi manages to reconcile his good-natured personality with his dark desires to become stronger. Simultaneously on Cray, the Royal Paladin characters depicted in Aichi's cards resolve their conflict with Ren's Shadow Paladins. Aichi defeats Ren, and Team Q4 becomes the national champions of Japan. The season concludes with Aichi's Psyqualia mysteriously vanishing and Kai fulfilling Aichi's wish to cardfight him again.

Season 2: Asia Circuit

Aichi reunites with Q4 (excluding Kai) and travels across Asia to participate in the Vanguard Fight Circuit, an invitational multi-stage tournament featuring the world's best cardfighters. One noteworthy rival is Team Dreadnought's Leon Soryu. After losing at multiple stages, Q4 finally manages to win the Japan Stage and meet with Takuto, who reveals that a dark entity known as Void is currently threatening the planet Cray. Furthermore, Leon is exposed as having made an alliance with Void. In a final confrontation, Aichi defeats Leon, who had absorbed Void's power. With a reformed Leon's help, Aichi uses his Gold Paladins to drive Void out of Cray and subsequently free the captured clans. The VF Circuit concludes with Q4 crowned as the winning team. Afterward, life returns to normal, except that Aichi now has a new deck featuring his signature Royal Paladin units as Gold Paladins.

Season 3: Link Joker

Months have passed after the VF Circuit, and the members of Team Q4 have drifted apart. Aichi enters his first year of high school at Miyaji Academy, and despite the interference of the Student Council, he manages to recruit the requisite five members for the card club: Kourin Tatsunagi, Naoki Ishida, Shingo Komoi, and Misaki. During Aichi's inaugural appearance at the VF High School Championship, his team defeats Kai's team but loses to Ren's team. The second major story arc of the season revolves around an extraterrestrial entity called "Link Joker". Various fighters become corrupted by Void's power and turn into "Reversed" fighters driven to seek out stronger opponents and bring them under Void's influence. Kai visits Takuto to seek answers, and in a moment of weakness while cardfighting the Reversed Takuto, he allows himself to become Reversed in exchange for additional power. Although Ren and Leon manage to fend off and free their respective comrades from Reverse, Aichi is unaware of what is happening until he sees Reversed Takuto announcing the end of the world. At first hesitant to face his Reversed friends, especially Kai, Aichi eventually resolves himself to fight them to save the world. After many battles, Aichi and his friends emerge victorious over Link Joker, but at the cost of losing the original Takuto.

Season 4: Legion Mate

Several days after the mortal battle against Link Joker, Aichi Sendou, the hero who saved the earth from the invasion, has disappeared, and Kai, his closest friend, seems to be the only person who remembers him. After receiving a Royal Paladin deck containing a new version of Aichi's avatar card Blaster Blade, Kai sets out not only to remind everyone about Aichi but also find him. Kai manages to gather others who remember Aichi. His investigation leads to the discovery of four magically gifted cardfighters called the Quatre Knights who intend to stop anyone finding Aichi. Ren gives Kai a tip to Aichi's location.

Kai learns that a Link Joker "seed" was implanted inside Aichi's body after he defeated Reversed Takuto. To contain the seed, Aichi sealed himself away in the sanctuary with the Quatre Knights as his guardians. However, Serra reveals that his plan all along was to obtain its power all for himself. After Kai makes Aichi realize that sealing himself away was wrong, Kai defeats him. The Link Joker seed then tries to implant itself into Kai's body but is then broken apart by Blaster Blade. Nevertheless, the shattered pieces of the seed enter the bodies of each of Aichi's friends and will grow benign over time. Afterwards, Aichi, Kai, and the rest of their friends return to their normal lives.

G Season 1

Set 3 years later after the events of Legion Mate, the story follows Chrono Shindou, an apathetic teenager who finds a Vanguard deck and a map in his school locker one day. Following the map, he is led to Card Capital 2, a card shop where he meets Kamui Katsuragi. After being taught how to play Vanguard and winning his first fight against Kamui, Chrono begins his venture in the world of Vanguard. Then, he meets and fights Kouji Ibuki. Ibuki defeats Chrono with no difficulty and refuses to even tell Chrono his name until Chrono becomes stronger. Chrono meets and befriends Shion Kiba and Tokoha Anjou. Chrono, Shion, and Tokoha form Team TRY3 and enter the National Tournament together.

At the regional qualifier, Team TRY3 fights Team Demise. Chrono beats their first fighter with no problems. Unfortunately, Shion and Tokoha ultimately lose in the second two games. In the aftermath of their defeat, Chrono's aunt discovers Chrono's new hobby and reveals the truth behind the disappearance of his father. Team TRY3 visits the United Sanctuary branch, seeking a rematch with Team Demise. They find that the United Sanctuary branch is turning fighters into people obsessed with victory, and challenge the Branch leader over the management of the United Sanctuary branch.

G Season 2: GIRS Crisis

This season focuses on a major event organised by the Federation of International Vanguard Associations (FIVA), known as the "G Quest". Those who conquer the 6 Branch Quests will be honored with the title "Generation Master", and the chance to become a Clan Leader.

G Season 3: Stride Gate

Kouji Ibuki's Plan G is in effect, and they have located Ryuzu Myoujin's headquarters. It's up to Team TRY3 and their friends to stop Ryuzu's ambitions. However, Ryuzu has a defense force called the "Company", whose members include rival Shouma Shinonome and Am Chouno.

G Season 4: NEXT

Five months have passed after Team TRY3's battle against the company and the team decided to split up and go their separate ways with all three of them enrolling to different high schools. The story focuses on Chrono Shindou transferring to Tokyo Metropolitan Harumi High School. Chrono forms a new team with Taiyou Asukawa and Kazuma Shouji, a gloomy boy who attends the same school as Chrono. Shion and Tokoha have formed their own teams as well.

G Season 5: Z

The final season of the G Series. A group of six units from Planet Cray, called the "Apostles", have invaded Earth. Armed with the power of the six Zeroth Dragons, the Apostles aim to revive the sealed Dragon Deity of Destruction, Gyze who attempted to destroy Cray in the past.

==== V era ====
V series Season 1:

A reboot of the original Cardfight Vanguard with Aichi Sendou, the rest of Q4, and other returning characters from the original series.

V series Season 2: Shinemon Arc

Starting 15 years before the first V series season, this season focuses on Shinemon Nitta, the present manager of Card Capital, attempting to save the shop from becoming a branch of Cardshop: Esuka.

V series Season 3: Extra Story -IF-

The final season of the V Series. This series is where both IF continuity world Emi Sendou and her fairy companion Shuka and the V continuity Kouji Ibuki and Suiko Tatsunagi team up to fight against the Jammer to save her brother, Aichi Sendou who has become the enemy (similar to Legion Mate).

=== English dub ===
An English dub co-produced by Ocean Productions (recorded at Blue Water Studios) began airing on Singapore's Okto channel from October 16, 2011, on Animax Asia from January 22, 2012, and on Malaysia's RTM-TV2 channel from November 18, 2012. Dubbed episodes also began being released on YouTube from May 29, 2012. The series can be seen officially on a dedicated channel for it created by Bushiroad, and is available for viewing in most countries without "geo-blocking" and some opening and ending themes are replaced with an English version of an available opening and ending theme due to licensing issues. An English dub of the fifth season G began airing on YouTube on January 3, 2015, thus skipping over the fourth season Legion Mate. Hulu began hosting the English-dubbed version on August 26, 2013, in partnership with Aniplex of America.

== Other media ==
=== Manga ===
A manga series written and illustrated by Akira Itō was announced along with the anime. The first chapter was published on November 26, 2010, in Kerokero Ace magazine. With Kerokero Ace ceasing publication after its September 2013 issue, new chapters of the manga continued starting with the first issue of Monthly Bushiroad magazine. While the manga shares the same characters as the anime, it follows an original storyline and contains many differences from the anime version. Vertical has licensed the manga series and began releasing it in North America on April 29, 2014.

A side story referred as Episode 0 was released on May 23, 2013. It is also illustrated by Itō. Its storyline follows Toshiki Kai's childhood.

=== Spin-offs ===
A spin-off manga series titled Mini Vanguard, also known as Mini Van (みにヴぁん), began publishing in Kerokero Ace alongside the original manga. The first chapter of the spinoff was released with the sixth chapter of the main manga series. Mini Vanguard is a short yonkoma comedy manga by Quily featuring all of the characters as super deformed. Like the original manga series, Mini Vanguard continued in the first issue of Monthly Bushiroad magazine after the final September 2013 issue of Kerokero Ace magazine. Mini Vanguard was adapted into a flash anime series produced by DLE. It aired from April 6, 2013, to December 14, 2013. The ending theme song is "Mirai Sketch" by Ultra Rare (Suzuko Mimori, Yoshino Nanjō, and Aimi Terakawa).

Another spin-off manga series titled Cardfight!! Vanguard Gaiden: Swordsman of Light (カードファイト!! ヴァンガード外伝 光の剣士, Kādofaito!! Vangādo Gaiden Hikari no Kenshi) was published in Monthly Bushiroad magazine. It is supervised by Akira Itō and illustrated by Makoto Kishimizu. Its story focuses on the lore of the Cardfight!! Vanguard trading card game.

=== Radio show ===
A talk radio show titled Stand Up Our Vanguard (立ち上がれ僕らのヴァンガード, Tachiagare Bokura no Vangādo), also known as TachiVan, began airing in 2011 on Hibiki Radio. It is currently split into two shows: the main show which changes its subtitle to coincide with the current anime season and airs on Saturdays, and TachiVan Sunday. It is hosted by Tsubasa Yonaga and Takuya Satō, the voice actors of Aichi and Kai respectively, with occasional guest appearances by other Japanese voice actors and actresses from the anime series.

=== Novel ===
A 224-page novel based on the anime series was released in Japan on May 15, 2013. It is written by Bandana Aoi, and the internal illustrations are done by Yōsuke Adachi. The story follows Aichi reaching out to a lonely young boy named Hiro Hamane (浜音ヒロ, Hamane Hiro).

=== Video games ===
A mobile app game titled Cardfight!! Vanguard: Cray Wars (カードファイト!! ヴァンガード 惑星大戦, Kādofaito!! Vangādo Wakusei Taisen; lit. Cardfight!! Vanguard Planet Wars) was released on March 12, 2013. It is a strategy role-playing game and is region-locked to prevent devices outside Japan from installing it.

A Nintendo 3DS video game adaption titled Cardfight!! Vanguard: Ride to Victory!! (カードファイト!! ヴァンガード ライド トゥ ビクトリー!!, Kādofaito!! Vangādo Raido tu Bikutorī!!) was released in Japan on April 11, 2013. It was developed by FuRyu. The game features an original story which stars a new cardfighter protagonist who is aiming to win a national tournament. Players choose one of six possible original characters to play as, one male and one female each of three personality types: hot-blooded, cool, and dark.

A second 3DS game adaption titled Cardfight!! Vanguard: Lock on Victory!! (カードファイト!! ヴァンガード ロック オン ビクトリー!!, Kādofaito!! Vangādo Roku On Bikutorī!!) was released in Japan on June 5, 2014, also developed by FuRyu. This game's story is based on the Link Joker arc of the anime series.

A downloadable game for Microsoft Windows titled Cardfight!! Online was planned to be released in early 2016, but was ultimately cancelled. It was developed by DELiGHTWORKS and CrossGames. The game was intended to be free-to-play with in-game transactions.

On January 14, 2016, Cardfight!! Vanguard G Stride to Victory (カードファイト!! ヴァンガードG ストライド トゥ ビクトリー!!) was released for Nintendo 3DS.

A video game for Nintendo Switch titled Cardfight!! Vanguard EX (カードファイト!! ヴァンガード エクス) was released on September 19, 2019, in Japan.

A mobile app titled Cardfight!! Vanguard Zero was released globally on April 9, 2020. Many mechanics from the original card game have been changed in favor of fast game play over full simulation.

On November 17, 2022, a video game titled Cardfight!! Vanguard Dear Days (カードファイト!! ヴァンガード ディアデイズ) was released for Nintendo Switch and PC. It is the first title to be translated and released outside of Japan, and was also developed by FuRyu. It was also the first Switch game to go above the initial price for the base game. A sequel, Cardfight!! Vanguard Dear Days 2, was released on January 30, 2025.

=== Live-action drama ===
A live-action 90-minute drama titled Stand Up! Vanguard was aired on May 3, 2012. It is directed by Takashi Motoki, who describes this project as the "first-ever live-action card-game program". It stars Daigo, Shinta Sōma, Haruki Uchiyama, Suzuko Mimori, Nao Nagasawa, Kazuki Namioka, and Kazuhiko Kanayama.

=== Live-action/anime film ===
A hybrid live-action/anime film was released on September 13, 2014. The live-action segment, A Game of Three (3つのゲーム, Mitsu no Gēmu), was directed by Takashi Motoki at Ace Crew Entertainment, and stars Daigo, Suzuko Mimori, Taizō Shīna, Takuma Sueno, and others. The anime portion, Neon Messiah (ネオンメサイア, Neon Mesaia), was directed by Shin Itagaki at Ultra Super Pictures, and screenplay was made by Mayori Sekijima. It features the animated debut of the character Kouji Ibuki (voiced by Mamoru Miyano). Neon Messiah made its US premiere on July 4, 2015, at Anime Expo.

== Reception ==
In its Winter 2011 Anime Preview Guide, the staff of Anime News Network had a poor impression of the anime series. Carl Kimlinger complained about the crass commercialism of the trading card game shows and was glad that the series (in his view) flopped. Carlo Santos and Bamboo Dong gave equally scathing reviews. Chris Beveridge of Mania.com compares the series with other trading card game based shows such as Yu-Gi-Oh! and states that, while he sees many kids using the series to take notes and getting their game plan, he feels the series still needs to work on being engaging and entertaining.

As for the trading card game, it has received praise for its marketing through the animated television show and various media, which has caused its popularity to rise immensely. On December 14, 2012, the company Interface in Design created a survey for which trading card game had the most fulfilling playing experience for the "Trading Card Game Award of 2012". Cardfight!! Vanguard was bestowed awards for the most excellent game in both Elementary School and General categories. It also received honorable mentions under the Junior High School, High School, and Adult categories. These awards were bestowed to Cardfight!! Vanguard due to the high praise the game received for its tournament events and ease of access to important updates in the Vanguard culture through magazines and websites. The ease of learning the game for new players was also an incredibly appealing aspect of the game.
