= List of Future Card Buddyfight episodes =

The following is a list of episodes for Bushiroad's Future Card Buddyfight anime series. It began in Japan on TV Tokyo and affiliate channels on January 4, 2014, at 8:00 AM. Right after the Japanese broadcast, it is simulcasted and dubbed in English on YouTube and Hulu that same day. Crunchyroll joined the English dub premieres on April 25.The series takes place in the year 2030. In addition to Earth where humans reside, there are other worlds where monsters exist. Certain humans and monsters can become "buddies" with each other and play against other Buddyfighters through the card game Future Card Buddyfight. The story follows Gao Mikado and his adventures in Buddyfight after becoming buddies with Drum Bunker Dragon.

The anime uses three pieces of theme music: two opening themes and three ending themes. The first opening theme from episode 1 to 46 was "Card of the Future" by Psychic Lover and Suara. The second and final opening from episode 47 to 64 was "Buddy Buddy BAAAAAN!!" by Marie Mizuno (as Gao Mikado) and Shuta Morishima (as Baku Omori). The second opening theme was not shown in the English version; instead, "Card of the Future" was shown. The first ending theme from episode 1 to 24 was "Buddy Buddy Fight!" by Sora Tokui (as Paruko Nanana) in the Japanese version and by Jenny Shima in the English dub. The second ending theme from episode 25 to 46 was "Natsuiro Fighting!!" by Sora Tokui (as Paruko Nanana). She also sang the English version for the dub which was included as a bonus track in the single. The third ending theme from episode 47 to 64 was "Shiny Up!" by Suzuko Mimori (as Hanako Mikado) and Jenny Shima in the English dub.

Future Card Buddyfight Hundred's first opening theme from episodes 1 to 21 was "Luminize" by fripSide in Japanese and Hannah Grace in English. The second opening from episodes 22 to 48 is "Beyond the limits" by Hideyuki Takahashi. The first ending theme from episodes 1 to 21 was "Buddy Lights" by Soma Saito in Japanese and Jovetta Rivera in English. The second ending theme from episode 22 to 50 is "Milky 100 World" by Milky Holmes. The second opening and ending theme are not shown in the English version.

From October 2, 2015, to March 25, 2017, dubbing was skipped for reasons unknown. Dubbing of the series was paused for the second half of Hundred (season 2, starting with episode 26) and the entirety of Triple D (Season 3). Dubbing resumed from X's first episode (season 4) and has continued since. Treated as episodes 90-165 for the whole series, the 76 skipped Future Card Buddyfight episodes remain undubbed.

Future Card Buddyfight Triple D's first opening theme from episodes 1 to 27 was "Chronograph" by Natsuhiro Takaaki. The second opening theme from episodes 28 to 51 is "DDD" by Shouta Aoi. The first ending theme from episodes 1 to 27 was "Wakey☆Thump SHOOTER" by Sora Tokui. The second ending theme from episode 28 to 39 is "Yume no Hikari-kun no Mirai" by Aina Aiba. The third ending theme from episode 40 to 51 is "Unite (Live Forever)" by British duo Bars and Melody.

Future Card Buddyfight X's first opening theme from episodes 1 to 29 is "Brave Soul Fight!" by Sora Tokui and Shūta Morishima. They performed both Japanese and English versions. The second opening theme from episode 30 to 52 is "Buddyfighter x Buddyfighter" by Jun Shirota. The first ending theme from episodes 1 to 29 is "Fight Against the Wind" (known in Japanese as "Mukai Kaze ni Fight") by Ayana Kinoshita (both Japanese and English). The second opening theme from episodes 30 to 52 is "B.O.F" by Poppin'Party.

Future Card Buddyfight Ace's opening theme is "Saa Ikō!" ("Let's Go!") by Poppin'Party (Japanese and English). The first ending theme was "Buddy☆Funny Days" by Takumi Mano, Daiki Kobayashi & Shuta Morishima (Japanese) and Brian P (English) from episodes 1 to 22. The second ending theme from episode 23 to 43 is Niji no Yakusoku by Shuuta Morishima.

== Future Card Buddyfight ==
Opening themes

- "Card of the Future" by Psychic Lover and Suara (eps. 1-46) (Original Japanese) / (eps. 1-63) (English Dub)
- "Buddy Buddy BAAAAAN!!" by Marie Mizuno & Shuta Morishima (eps. 47–63)

Ending themes

- "Buddy Buddy Fight!" by Sora Tokui (eps. 1-24)
- "Natsuiro Fighting!!" by Sora Tokui (eps. 25–46)
- "Shiny Up!" by Suzuko Mimori (eps. 47–64)

No.	Title	Original release date
1	"Gao, Roars!"; Transliteration: "Gao, Hoeru!" (Japanese: 牙王、吼える！)	January 4, 2014
On Earth, Tasuku Ryuenji, a young prodigy member of the Buddy Police, busts a fugitive in a Buddyfight as Gao Mikado watches the scene unfold on TV. On his way home, Gao, assuming the name "Mighty Sun Fighter", saves a boy from a group of bullies using his Aiki-jūjutsu skills and returns home only to be scolded by his mother Suzumi. The next day, Gao goes to school, Aibo Academy, and meets up with his classmates: Kuguru Uki, Baku Omori, and Noboru Kodo. In class, he and his classmates open booster packs of Future Card Buddyfight when Gao suddenly pulls a Buddy Rare card, which summons Drum Bunker Dragon Fang Slade Terrestrial the 13th from the Dragon World. Drum's appearance means that Gao is to become buddies with him, although Drum is reluctant after having monitored Gao's actions from the Dragon World up to his point. Then, Tasuku and his buddy Jackknife Dragon arrive, and Tasuku gives Gao a Core Deck Case in recognition of him becoming buddies with a monster, officially making Gao a Buddyfighter. Tasuku takes his leave until Gao decides to challenge him to a Buddyfight.
2	"Gao vs. Tasuku! / Luminize! Bakudora!!"; Transliteration: "Ruminaizu! Bakudora!!" (Japanese: ルミナイズ！爆ドラ！！)	January 11, 2014
Tasuku accepts Gao's sudden challenge, and the fight is arranged to take place later. During lunch, Gao gets help from Baku on building a deck to suit his playstyle. Then, Gao and Tasuku's Buddyfight commences in the school's amphitheatre as Gao's friends and little sister Hanako watch from the stands. Gao's aggressive strategy eventually earns him the victory over Tasuku, who then recognizes Gao as his rival and gives him the Gargantua Punisher card.
3	"Dancing with a Demon! / The Demon and the Dancing Fighter!"; Transliteration: "Akuma to Odoru Faitā!" (Japanese: 悪魔と踊るファイター！)	January 18, 2014
After Drum quickly gets settled into Gao's family, Gao goes to school. He asks Baku to help reconstruct his deck to include the Gargantua Punisher card that he received from Tasuku, but Baku and Kuguru believe that Gao is not yet ready to use it and recommend him to find a "tuner" (training partner). Later, Gao meets his dancing and rapping classmate Tetsuya Kurodake and wants him to be his tuner. Tetsuya agrees but only if Gao can beat him in a Buddyfight under special conditions. So, Gao battles Tetsuya, whose buddy monster turns out to be the popular entertainer Demon Lord, Asmodai. Nonetheless, Gao manages to win using Gargantua Punisher and becomes friends with Tetsuya after the fight.
4	"The Rules of Buddyfight! / Trial! This is Buddyfight!!"; Transliteration: "Toraiaru! Kore ga Badifaito da!!" (Japanese: トライアル！これがバディファイトだ！！)	January 25, 2014
Gao and Drum have an argument and get mad at each other as Gao goes to school (with Drum secretly following him). There, his class is introduced to a new transfer student: Kiri Hyoryu, who is the boy that Gao saved from the group of bullies and has since then admired Gao. After school, Gao takes Kiri to the Castle Store where the Manager teaches Kiri how to Buddyfight by having him play an actual game. Both Kiri and the Manager use trial decks to fight as Gao stays by Kiri's side. With helpful teaching from both Gao and the Manager and despite being new to the game, Kiri defeats the Manager. After the battle, Kiri is congratulated by a stranger, Rouga Aragami, who goes on to tell him that winning is most important. Gao expresses his disagreement with Rouga, who takes his leave. Then, the bullies appear to challenge Gao, who is reunited with Drum and beats one of the bullies in a Buddyfight. After the bullies retreat, Gao and Drum reconcile. Elsewhere, Rouga is instructed by his superior, Magoroku Shido, to retrieve photon metal. Rouga uses his Dark Core to assume the identity of "Wolf" and calls out his buddy Armorknight Cerberus to start the mission. Note: Aichi Sendou, Kamui Katsuragi, Toshiki Kai, Ren Suzugamori, Tetsu Shinjou, Naoki Ishida, Shingo Komoi, Kourin Tatsunagi and Misaki Tokura from the Cardfight!! Vanguard anime make cameo appearances near the end of the episode. Misaki is the only one who gets a speaking portion for one line.
5	"Future Force Shines!"; Transliteration: "Fyūchā Fōse Kagayaku!" (Japanese: フューチャーフォース輝く！)	February 1, 2014
Despite running late, Gao and his classmates attend a field trip to the photon metal mine in Mt. Fuji. However, the mine is attacked by Rouga (as Wolf) and Armorknight Cerberus, who have stolen some of the photon metal. Gao and Drum confront them, and they are shocked to see that Wolf is turning Buddyfight card effects into reality. Buddy Police officer Tsurugi Takihara arrives and attempts to apprehend Wolf but is taken out by him. Then, Tasuku appears and gets approval from Buddy Police Commander I to use Future Force, which allows Tasuku to also bring cards to life. After weakening Wolf with this power, Tasuku creates a Buddy Police barrier from a Buddy Police satellite to surround the area and engage Wolf into a Buddyfight. Tasuku is about to defeat Wolf with the Gargantua Punisher card (which Gao gave back to him prior to the beginning of the Buddyfight). Suddenly, the satellite suddenly explodes, which destroys the barrier and allows Wolf and Cerberus to escape. Afterwards, Gao asks Tasuku about the unique powers that he and Wolf were using, but Tasuku does not tell him and gives the Gargantua Punisher card back to him. Elsewhere, Rouga is frustrated after almost losing to Tasuku. He is then recommended by a dark monster to go after Gao before getting the chance to get revenge on Tasuku.
6	"Rouga Aragami Attacks!"; Transliteration: "Kyōshū! Aragami Rōga!!" (Japanese: 強襲！荒神ロウガ！！)	February 8, 2014
Assuming his identity as the top Buddyfighter in 8th grade at Aibo Academy, Rouga challenges Gao to a Buddyfight, but Gao refuses. Rouga slips on a banana peel set up by Tetsuya and Asmodai, which prompts him to challenge Tetsuya, which Asmodai accepts (without Tetsuya's consent). During lunch break, while Rouga and Tetsuya battle, Gao is reminded about a time when he also believed that winning was everything like Rouga. When Gao's hunger for winning led to him injuring someone during a martial arts match, he realized that mentality is wrong. Gao has since then changed in order to make more friends. With no damage taken, Rouga is victorious over Tetsuya. Then, Gao appears before Rouga, and the two decide to Buddyfight after school. With a new deck constructed by Baku, Gao defeats Rouga in one turn. However, Gao was so focused on winning that he fears he might have made the same mistake and hurt Rouga. Gao tries to look for him, but he is informed by Mr. Hitotaba Neginoyama that Rouga has permanently left school. Neginoyama comforts Gao by telling him to try to become friends with Rouga and to learn from his mistakes. Having watched Gao's fight against Rouga and listening to the conversation, Tasuku resolves himself to capture Wolf...
7	"Deck Building to Victory!"; Transliteration: "Dekki Birudā ha Shōri no Aibō" (Japanese: デッキビルダーは勝利の相棒！)	February 15, 2014
When Gao learns about the upcoming team tournament known as the Aibo Buddy Cup (ABC), he wants to participate in it with Baku and Kuguru as his teammates. However, Gao and Baku soon argue over the naming of their team and go their separate ways. Later, Kuguru invites Gao to her home where he finds Baku constructing Tetsuya's deck in the hopes of conciliating things between Gao and Baku. Meanwhile, after winning several Buddyfights against his partners Kakumo Maihama and Raita Niitani, Noboru walks back home and is followed by a mysterious old man. Having seen all of Noboru's fights, the old man criticizes his playstyle and suggests to add the El Quixote card to help his deck, but Noboru ignores him. He then sees Tetsuya on the street and decides to challenge him to a Buddyfight as a warmup to the ABC Cup. The next day after school, Noboru, the second-best fighter of the school's sixth grade, begins his Buddyfight against Tetsuya, who is contrastly the lowest ranked fighter in the same grade, while Gao and his friends watch. With Baku's newly constructed deck that is centric on Asmodai, Tetsuya surprisingly defeats Noboru, who lost because of what the old man had criticized him about earlier. After the fight, Gao and Baku make amends, and Kuguru suggests for their team name to be "Balle du Soleil". Elsewhere, Noboru again meets the old man, who decides to help him. When Noboru asks for the old man's identity, he reveals himself as the monster Dragon Knight, El Quixote.
8	"Break Past the Final Qualifier!"; Transliteration: "Saishūyosen, Toppa seyo!" (Japanese: 最終予選、突破せよ！)	February 22, 2014
Tasuku tries to convince his fellow Buddy Police members that Rouga is the criminal Wolf, but everyone says there is not enough evidence to prove it. Moreover, Commander I believes Wolf is not working alone and that Aibo Academy may be connected in the grand scheme of things. Meanwhile, at Aibo Academy, Magoroku, the school's student council president, and Sophia Sakharov, the vice-president, review all of the fighters who will be participating in the ABC Cup, including Gao, Tetsuya, Noboru (who recently became buddies with Dragon Knight, El Quixote), and especially Zanya Kisaragi, who was the only elementary student to have defeated the middle school students in the last ABC Cup. Later, the ABC Cup officially begins with opening qualifiers. The first four teams in the elementary school division to win five matches will go on to the ABC Cup's main event, where they will face four teams from the middle school division. Zanya's Team Kisaragi advances first, second is (surprisingly) Tetsuya's Team Tetsu & Dai, third is Noboru's Team Rising Tiger, and fourth is Gao's Team Balle du Soleil. But unbeknownst to Gao, he is being targeted by someone named Jin Magatsu.
9	"The Stolen Dragon Deck!"; Transliteration: "Nusumareta Baku Dora" (Japanese: 盗まれた爆ドラ！)	March 1, 2014
To better prepare Gao for the ABC Cup, Baku and Kuguru construct a new deck that gives Gao more defensive options, especially with the addition of the card Thunder Knights, Halberd Dragon. However, Gao does not like the idea of using others to protect himself and rejects the deck. As the group leaves school, Baku bumps into someone and drops his card case, but that person picks it up for him. The next day, Baku tells Gao that his original deck has been stolen by that person he bumped into before: Jin Magatsu, a shady 7th-grade student from Aibo Academy. Gao and his friends track down Jin, who will only return the deck if Gao beats him in a Buddyfight. So, with the new deck, Gao fights against Jin, who is using the original deck. When Gao is pushed to a corner, he eventually comes to realize from Halberd Dragon that everybody has something that they must do; in Halberd Dragon's case, it is to protect Gao. So, with Halberd Dragon's defensive ability to shield him from attacks, Gao manages to defeat Jin. After the fight, it is revealed that this entire fiasco was just an act set up by Baku, Kuguru, Kiri, and Jin, who returns the deck back to Gao. Having also realized his friends' efforts into making the new deck, Gao apologizes to them and accepts the newly named "Soleil Dragon Deck". Then, Jin reveals that he will participate in the ABC Cup along with Team Seifukai, Magoroku, and Suzuha Amanosuzu, the rich daughter of the large Amanosuzu company's founder. Despite the appearance of new opponents, Gao welcomes the challenge.
10	"The Card of Heroes!"; Transliteration: "Eiyū-tachi no Kādo!" (Japanese: 英雄たちのカード！)	March 8, 2014
Noboru goes to the Buddy Police headquarters to void his contract with El Quixote and be done with Buddyfighting. Suddenly, the alarm sounds due to the appearance of the criminal Akaoni Kanme, prompting Tasuku and Takihara to apprehend him. Noboru is invited by Commander I into the Buddy Police's main room where he not only watches Tasuku defeat and arrest Akaoni, but he also learns about Tasuku's past. Noboru then runs off, frustrated at himself for not being special like Tasuku or Gao. Nonetheless, he gets encouragement from El Quixote who tells him to do what he wants to do, regardless of what others may say. Noboru and El Quixote then come across Aooni Kanme, another criminal and the younger brother of Akaoni. Shortly after losing his Buddy monster, Aooni challenges Noboru to a Buddyfight with both of their Buddy Rare cards at stake. The two then wage battle by the Castle Store, where Gao and many other participants in the ABC Cup are having a party. Everyone eventually catches wind of Noboru's fight, and they watch it unfold. After realizing what he really wants to do (being like his adored Dragon Knights), Noboru launches a triple strike on Aooni and wins. Aooni tries to attack Noboru directly, but El Quixote activates his Buddy Skill to protect Noboru. Soon after, Aooni is arrested by Takihara, and Noboru decides to keep Buddyfighting.
11	"The Start of the Aibo Buddy Cup! / The Curtain Rises! The Aibo Buddy Cup!!"; Transliteration: "Kaimaku! Aibō Badi Kappu!!" (Japanese: 開幕！相棒バディカップ！！)	March 15, 2014
The finals of the ABC Cup begins after an introduction of each team from the school's two principals Ikarino and Nigirikobushi. The first match pits Team Balle du Soleil's Gao against Team Amanosuzu Group's Suzuha. Despite Suzuha's elegant plays with her Magic World deck, Gao manages to win using Gargantua Punisher. The two shake hands after the match, and Suzuha takes her leave (and hides her embarrassment after developing feelings for Gao).
12	"Power vs. Ninja Arts! A Fierce Competition! / Power vs Ninjutsu! Eat or be Eaten?!"; Transliteration: "Pawā vs Ninpō! Kū ka Kirareru ka!?" (Japanese: パワーvs忍法！食うか斬られるか！？)	March 22, 2014
Gao and his friends witness a confrontation between Team Kisaragi and Team Seifukai. Gao attempts to intervene, but the standoff is broken up by Seifukai's deputy leader Totsuo Doai. Later, Doai tells Gao about how Seifukai's leader, Genma Todoroki, and his deck have gone missing. In addition to recommending Gao to join Seifukai (although Gao declines his offer), Doai says that he will be taking Genma's place in the upcoming match against Team Kisaragi. Then, the ABC Cup continues with the Buddyfight between Team Kisaragi's Zanya and Team Seifukai's Doai as Gao and his friends watch. Despite Doai's powerful attacks, Zanya outmaneuvers him and eventually wins. After the fight, Zanya overhears Magoroku talking about having Genma's deck. Zanya orders his buddy monster Nanomachine Ninja, Tsukikage to secretly follow him, not fully knowing that Magoroku is the person behind Genma's disappearance.
13	"Powers Unite! Dragonic Punisher! / The Bonds Between Souls! Dragonic Punisher!!"; Transliteration: "Tamashī no Kizuna! Doragonikku Panisshā" (Japanese: 魂の絆！ドラゴニック・パニッシャー！！)	March 29, 2014
Magoroku tries to collude with Jin to defeat all opponents in the ABC Cup and let Magoroku win the entire tournament. However, Jin declines after Magoroku refuses to offer more compensation to him. When Jin leaves, he starts thinking of purposely losing his upcoming fight against Tetsuya. Tasuku, who is on an undercover mission, overhears Jin and chastises him. Then, continuing his mission, Tasuku and Jackknife Dragon find their target, a dark monster named Azi Dahaka (the same monster in charge of Magoroku). Azi Dahaka takes Tasuku and Jackknife to a battle arena in a different dimension where they are confronted by Superarmor Dragon, Galvanic Feather Dragon. Back on Earth, the ABC Cup continues as Jin plays against Tetsuya. Although still intending to lose the match, Jin is suddenly reminded of Gao, which motivates him to defeat Tetsuya and advance in the Cup. In the other dimension, Tasuku and Jackknife try to fight together against Galvanic Feather Dragon, who fends them off easily. Reminded of the time in which they combined their powers to create the Gargantua Punisher card, Tasuku and Jackknife do the same thing again to make a new card, Dragonic Punisher, to defeat Galvanic Feather Dragon. After Galvanic Feather Dragon decides to join Tasuku and Jackknife, they safely return to Earth, where Tasuku congratulates Jin on his victory and apologizes to him.
14	"Noble Heart! Together with the Dragon Knight!"; Transliteration: "Kedakaki Kokoro! Ryū Kishi to Tomo ni!!" (Japanese: 気高き心！竜騎士と共に！！)	April 5, 2014
The next quarterfinal match of the ABC Cup will be Noboru versus Magoroku. Before the match begins, Noboru meets with Magoroku in the student council room, where it is revealed that Noboru had unwittingly been bribed by Magoroku to lose to him during the previous ABC Cup. However, he decides to not take his bribe this time but still intends to throw the match. With helpful advice from El Quixote, Noboru resolves himself to not only have a fair fight against Magoroku but also reconstruct his deck to include a certain card. The match between Noboru and Magoroku in the ABC Cup commences. Magoroku makes strong plays and taunts Noboru, who then turns the game around and wins by using the card that Noboru had gotten from the bribe: Dragon Knight, Vlad Dracula. Back at the student council room, Doai looks for clues to Genma's whereabouts after receiving an anonymous tip (from Zanya). Unfortunately, he is sent down a secret pit by Sophia, where he ends up trapped with Genma.
15	"Dragons Duel! Journey of the Tiger! / Thus, the Tiger Shall Dash Through a Great Distance!"; Transliteration: "Soshite Tora wa Senri o Kakeru!" (Japanese: そして虎は千里を駆ける！)	April 12, 2014
Gao and his friends are informed by Noboru's parents that they and Noboru will leave the country soon. Then, the first semifinal match of the ABC Cup commences with Gao facing Noboru. While fighting, in addition to recalling their pasts, Gao is infuriated that Noboru did not tell anyone about his departure, while Noboru expresses his frustration over how Gao always seems to be in the spotlight. Despite Noboru following advice from the teammates (Maihama and Niitani) he ignored, Gao emerges victorious. Afterwards, at an airport, Gao and his friends bid farewell to Noboru, who sheds tears and subsequently leaves Japan.
16	"Mystique Explosion! The Great Katana World Battle!"; Transliteration: "Higi Sakuretsu! Katana Wārudo Daikessen!!" (Japanese: 秘技炸裂！カタナワールド大決戦!！！)	April 19, 2014
Gao and his friends learn from the Seifukai that Doai is missing. They also learn that Zanya knows something about it and has found Genma's deck in the student council office. However, the deck is currently in the possession of Zanya's little brother, Akatsuki, who wants to give the deck back to Seifukai but is nowhere to be found. So, while Zanya fights against Jin in the last semifinal match of the ABC Cup, Gao and the rest try to search for Akatsuki. Sophia locates and gets to Akatsuki first, and she then takes him to the student council office. Gao and company track them down but see Akatsuki returning to Zanya, who defeats Jin. Afterwards, everyone regroups, and Akatsuki gives the box containing Genma's deck back to Seifukai, but everyone is shocked when they discover the box is empty. Back at the student council room, it is revealed that Sophia has taken the deck...
17	"ABC Cup Final! Exploring the Underground Maze!"; Transliteration: "ABC Kappu Kesshō! Chika Meikyū Daibōken!!" (Japanese: ABCカップ決勝！地下迷宮大冒険！！)	April 26, 2014
Intending to have Genma inherit the Dark Core (which was formerly in Rouga's possession), Sophia uses the Dark Core on Doai. She puts Doai under her control and has him attack Genma to coerce him into using the Core. Meanwhile, Gao, his friends, and family members are having a dinner party when Akatsuki drops in. Zanya arrives to retrieve him while also telling Gao that he does not see him as a rival. The next day, Gao faces off against Zanya in the final match of the ABC Cup, with Zanya declaring that he will defeat Gao within two turns. At the same time, knowing how much Zanya wants to fight against Genma, some of Gao's comrades try to search for him. They traverse through an underground labyrinth and track him down but are then assaulted by Doai who is still under Sophia's control. Suddenly, Gao's mother Suzumi appears and stops Doai, returning him to normal. Genma is then freed from his prison and makes his way back to the student council room to confront Magoroku. After getting his deck back from Sophia, Genma takes Magoroku to the amphitheater just as the fight between Gao and Zanya reaches its climax. Before Genma could expose Magoroku's crimes to everyone, Magoroku quickly proposes to immediately have a Buddyfight against Genma. This ends Gao and Zanya's fight with no result, although Zanya's opinion of Gao has changed for the better.
18	"Menacing Duel Sieger!"; Transliteration: "Kyōi! Dyueru Zīgā!!" (Japanese: 脅威！デュエルズィーガー！！)	May 3, 2014
Genma and Magoroku have their Buddyfight with both of them using Ancient World decks. As the fight goes on, Genma expresses his disgust at how Magoroku is acting as student council president. He also shares his ideals of how the president should be like the "sun", which intrigues Gao. Genma eventually uses his powerful buddy monster Martial Arts Dragon Emperor, Duel Sieger to defeat Magoroku. Then, Genma fights against Zanya, who has been waiting for this rematch ever since losing to him in the previous ABC Cup. After much sacrifice, Zanya destroys Genma's Duel Sieger to supposedly win the match. However, Genma stays in the game by summoning Duel Sieger "Spartand", a stronger evolved form of the original.
19	"The Card Yota Left Behind! / The Card My Older Brother Left Behind"; Transliteration: "Ani ga Nokoshita Kādo" (Japanese: 兄が遺したカード)	May 10, 2014
After Genma defeats Zanya, the tournament is temporarily put on hold to repair the fight stadium. Gao and his friends meet at his home, and then Doai appears to deliver a message from Genma, telling Gao to withdraw from the upcoming match. Gao refuses to do so, which Doai expected, and before leaving, he warns Gao about Genma's Koryukien deck. Later, while Gao and his friends are having a dinner party, Suzumi reminisces about Gao's deceased older brother Yota and talks about how she wanted to keep Gao close to her. She then resolves her feelings and gives Gao a card that Yota left behind, which Gao decides to add to his deck. The next day, the final Buddyfight in the ABC Cup between Gao and Genma ensues.
20	"The Powerful Sun Fist! / Summon a Miracle! Fist of the Sun!!"; Transliteration: "Kiseki o Yobu! Taiyō no Kobushi!!" (Japanese: 奇跡を呼ぶ！太陽のコブシ！！)	May 17, 2014
Just when Gao defeats Duel Sieger "Spartand", Genma evolves it into its ultimate form: Duel Sieger "Tempest Enforcer". After attacking Gao with "Tempest Enforcer" three times, Genma reveals that he was once friends with Gao's brother Yota. They met while in the hospital where a young Genma became interested in Yota's comics about the "Mighty Sun Fighter". Genma was inspired by the message of the Sun Fighter, thinking it meant to be a strong leader for others to follow, which shaped him to the person he currently is and claiming the title of "Mighty Sun Fighter" to himself. However, Gao refutes him by saying the real purpose of the Sun Fighter is to serve as a role model to motivate others to follow their dreams. As Genma realizes his misunderstanding, Gao uses the card that Yota left (which is revealed to have originally belonged to Genma): Sun Fist, Sunshine Impact. Attacking together with Drum Bunker Dragon, Gao destroys "Tempest Enforcer", which, due to its negative effect, causes Genma to instantly lose, thus making Gao and Team Balle du Soleil the winners of the ABC Cup. In celebration of this victory, Gao and his friends have a party and are later joined by Genma, who gives Yota's comics to Gao and pays his respects to Yota. Despite the cheery atmosphere, Drum is feeling unsatisfied with his overall performance and tries to think of ways to become stronger...
21	"Buddy Monsters Unite! / The Great Buddy Monsters Gathering!"; Transliteration: "Badi Monsutā Dai Shūgō!" (Japanese: バディモンスター大集合！)	May 24, 2014
Gao and his friends gather in his home where they recap and discuss the events of the ABC Cup. Meanwhile, the Buddy Police is taken over by Sueroku, who is Magoroku Shido's father and also a special detective. Because of Tasuku's unauthorized usage of Future Force, Sueroku forbids him from using Buddyfight cards for one month. Elsewhere, Sophia has a meeting with her master, Kyoya Gaen. Later, after Gao's family visits Yota's grave, Suzumi tells Gao that she has taken a job to teach martial arts in North America. Although initially shocked, Gao and the rest become supportive of Suzumi's decision.
22	"Evil Power, Disaster Force!"; Transliteration: "Akuma no Chikara! Dizasutā Fōse!!" (Japanese: 悪魔の力！ディザスターフォース！！)	May 31, 2014
Gao, Tasuku, and the other participants of the ABC Cup are invited on a cruise ship party hosted by Kyoya Gaen, who is working with Sophia to look for a candidate Buddyfighter to use the Dark Core and Disaster Force. Later, Kyoya tries to present a special rare card to be given to a Buddyfighter of his choosing, but it goes missing. Although it seemed as if the card was stolen, it turns out that the card was in fact the monster Dragowizard, Qinus Axia who had gone off on his own because he did not want to be given away. In secret, Kyoya activates Disaster Force to make icebergs appear while Sophia reverts Axia back into a card and threatens to destroy it. When she throws the card away, Gao and Drum catch it but are about to fall into the ocean. They are both then saved by Tasuku and Jackknife Dragon, in spite of Tasuku's recent ban. Furthermore, Tasuku uses Future Force and teams up with Jack to destroy the icebergs and protect the ship from crashing. Gao and his friends return home, and Axia becomes attached to Drum after being saved by him. Then, Drum suddenly tells Gao that he will be leaving to become stronger. Leaving Axia to act as Gao's temporary buddy, Drum goes back to Dragon World, and Gao cries for him to return.
23	"Drum's Heroic Adventure! / It's Hard Being a Hero! Drum's Big Adventure!!"; Transliteration: "Yūsha wa Tsurai ze! Doramu no Daibōken!!" (Japanese: 勇者はつらいぜ！ドラムの大冒険！！)	June 7, 2014
Drum returns to Dragon World to seek advice on becoming stronger from his father. He asks Drum if strength is all Drum wants and then kicks him into Dungeon World, where Drum gets equipped with a new weapon and armor. He saves a village by inadvertently slaying a rampaging golem monster. The villagers (who look similar to Gao's human friends from Earth) then believe that Drum is a legendary hero and request him to defeat the king of the monsters in the mountains. After being given a stone tablet that is reminiscent of a Buddyfight deck, Drum uses it to summon other heroes who closely resemble Tasuku, Baku, Kuguru, and Tetsuya to aid in his quest. Although the group was initially disorganized, Drum eventually realizes that working together and not giving up are keys to getting stronger. He finishes the quest and reports back to his father, who then kicks Drum into another world for more training. Meanwhile on Earth, Gao is depressed about Drum's departure. By the Castle Store, Gao, Axia, and the store manager watch a Buddyfight unfold between Kenta Zakoyama (the leader of the delinquents who Gao previously had beaten) and "Wind", the strongest fighter of the store who uses the unpredictable Dungeon World deck. In the end, Zakoyama is defeated, and "Wind" is revealed to be a girl named Kazane Fujimiya. Inspired by that fight, Gao decides to challenge Kazane.
—	"Everyone Gathers! Eleven Buddy Fighters!! (Recap Special)"; Transliteration: "Zennin Shūgō! Jū-ichinin no Badi Faitā" (Japanese: 全員集合！11人のバディファイター！！)	June 14, 2014 (BS Japan)
24	"The Friends of Dungeon World! / 100 Friends! Dungeon World!!"; Transliteration: "Tomodachi 100 nin! Danjon Wārudo!!" (Japanese: ともだち100人！ダンジョンワールド！！)	June 21, 2014
Gao and Kazane engage in a Buddyfight, in which Kazane exhibits more of the fun gambling style of her Dungeon World deck. With Drum returning to Gao's side to aid him in battle, Gao defeats Kazane, and the two fighters become friends. Elsewhere, Kiri is feeling pessimistic about his Buddyfighting skills when Rouga suddenly appears and takes him away. Having witnessed this scene, Paruko Nanana informs Gao and the rest about Kiri's abduction. They later learn that Kiri has been taken to Sengoku Academy...
25	"Buddyfight Intensified! Sengoku Academy! / Building of Hell! Sengoku Academy!!"; Transliteration: "Jigoku no Manabiya! Sengoku Gakuen!!" (Japanese: 地獄の学舎！戦国学園！！)	June 28, 2014
Borrowing Suzuha's airship, Gao and his friends travel to Sengoku Academy, a supremacist school in the mountains where everything is resolved through Buddyfights. On the way there, the group is attacked by the monster Sky Ninja, Yamigarasu but saved by the timely appearances of Genma and Duel Sieger. The team lands within Sengoku Academy and are challenged by several Sengoku students. Gao and his friends beat them all in Buddyfights, and they are later given a tour of the school by Shosetsu Kirisame, who is one of the "four demon generals" of Sengoku Academy. After meeting with the other three generals (Raremaro, Kanahebi, and Kemura), Rouga appears and Gao demands to know where Kiri is. Then, Rouga has Gao and his band of friends engage in a 5-vs-5 Waseda style of Buddyfight with Rouga teaming with the four generals. In the first match, Tetsuya and Rouga face off. Tetsuya tries to win the fight in the first turn, but Rouga retaliates with new cards to quickly finish the battle in the following turn. Gao angrily watches as Rouga demands for someone stronger to step up...
26	"Challenge from Legend World!"; Transliteration: "Rejendo Wārudo no Chōsen!" (Japanese: レジェンドワールドの挑戦！)	July 5, 2014
The second game of the 5-on-5 match is Genma versus Kemura, who uses a Legend World deck. Although Genma and Kemura are acquaintances, they fight to the best of their abilities. When Kemura learns that a card (Dragon Vanquishing Sword, Balmung) has been added to his deck (by Raremaro) to specifically counter Genma's Duel Sieger "Spartand", Kemura faces a tough decision between accepting Genma's friendship or winning the fight. Ultimately, Kemura gives in to Rouga's philosophy of "winning is everything" and uses the hate card to win the game. Afterwards, Genma leaves in disappointment, and Kemura feels ashamed for winning in that manner.
27	"Buddies Bring Their Best! / If it's our Friend, We'll Fight with all our Power!"; Transliteration: "Tomodachi Nara Zenryoku Faito!" (Japanese: 友達なら全力ファイト！)	July 12, 2014
Kazane volunteers to face Kemura in the next match. Although Kemura initially does not play well after what happened in his fight with Genma, Rouga snaps him out of it and the two fighters continue to play at their best. It is revealed that Raremaro was the one who put the hate card in Kemura's deck. Kazane defeats Kemura, who then tells off Raremaro and leaves to reconcile with Genma. For the next match, Zanya decides to step up.
28	"Flying Ninja Showdown! / A Ninja Showdown! The Wings Called Dreams!!"; Transliteration: "Ninja Taiketsu! Yume to Iu Na no Tsubasa!!" (Japanese: ニンジャ対決！夢という名の翼！！)	July 19, 2014
Zanya's opponent is the second of the Demon Generals, Kanahebi, who comes from a notorious ninja clan that had almost all of its members arrested by the police, the commissioner of which was Zanya's father. While claiming to have abandoned his dream of reviving his ninja clan, Kanahebi halts Zanya's assault while slowly whittling Zanya's life points away. However, Zanya manages to overcome Kanahebi's stall tactics and wins the fight while also convincing Kanahebi to continue pursuing his dream.
29	"Activate! Mega Blast Bunker!"; Transliteration: "Kimero! Mega Burasuto Bankā!!" (Japanese: 決めろ！メガブラスト・バンカー！！)	July 26, 2014
The next match is Gao against the third of the Demon Generals, Raremaro Tefudanokimi, who adjusted his deck to counter Gao's Dragon World deck. Much to everyone's surprise, Gao is now using a Magic World deck, and his buddy Drum Bunker Dragon has accordingly changed to Dragowizard, Magician Drum (as a result of Drum's training). Although it seems as if Gao does not know how to effectively use his new deck, Gao pulls off a masterful combo to activate Drum's new ability, Mega Blast Bunker, which deals heavy damage to Raremaro. After Gao wins, he tries to befriend Raremaro but is interrupted by Rouga. For the next fight, the last of the Demon Generals, Shosetsu Kirisame, prepares for battle...
30	"Invincible Swordsman! Shosetsu Kirisame!"; Transliteration: "Muteki no Kenshi! Kirisame Shōsetsu!!" (Japanese: 無敵の剣士！霧雨正雪！！)	August 2, 2014
While Gao and Drum go to the Sengoku Academy dormitory to buy food for their friends, Kazane volunteers to fight against Shosetsu Kirisame, who uses a Legend World deck. Shosetsu quickly defeats her on his second turn, prompting Zanya to fight next. While battling Zanya, Shosetsu recalls the time when he first saw Rouga and was in awe of his power to bring card effects into reality. When Rouga first arrived in Sengoku Academy, Shosetsu tried to fight him but was utterly defeated. He submitted himself to Rouga and became his servant, but only as a cover to bide his time and learn the secret of Rouga's power. Back to the fight, Shosetsu makes a final attack with his buddy item – Immortal Sword, Durandal. Zanya tries to counter it, but due to the item's invincibility, the attack continues and Zanya loses the battle. Meanwhile, Gao spots Sophia in Sengoku Academy and tries to follow her...
31	"Gao's Buddy Skill Is On!"; Transliteration: "Gao, Badi Sukiru Kakusei!" (Japanese: 牙王，バディスキル覚醒！)	August 9, 2014
In Sengoku Academy's reference room, Sophia offers the Dark Core to Kiri. At first hesitant, Kiri recalls the time when Rouga first brought him to Sengoku while also remembering Rouga's philosophy of winning. Kiri is almost tempted to accept the Dark Core when he hears Gao's voice calling for him. Sophia knocks Kiri unconscious when Gao and Drum arrive. Sophia unleashes Disaster Force and teleports Gao and Drum into the sky, sending them plummeting. It is at this time that Drum activates his Buddy Skill, which gives both himself and Gao the ability of flight and save themselves. Gao and Drum then return to the fight field to face Shosetsu, who received the Dark Core from Sophia.
32	"The Legendary Sword Excalibur! / The Strongest! King Sword Excalibur!!"; Transliteration: "Saikyō! Ōken Ekusukaribā!!" (Japanese: 最強！王剣エクスカリバー！！)	August 16, 2014
As the fight between Gao and Shosetsu continues, the latter slowly becomes more corrupted from using the Dark Core. Shosetsu tries to use the item card – Sword of the King, Excalibur – but the sword rejects him. Angry, Shosetsu uses the Dark Core to bring his card effects into reality and starts attacking others. The buddy monsters of Gao's friends try to stop Shosetsu, but they are all struck down. Shosetsu then attacks Rouga, who stops his assault with a card effect brought into reality. This makes Gao realize that Rouga is actually the criminal Wolf. Tasuku arrives and uses Future Force to stop Shosetsu and breaks the Dark Core. Shosetsu is about to be arrested, but Gao defends him and convinces Tasuku to let Shosetsu finish the Buddyfight. Having learned his lesson, Shosetsu is now able to equip Excalibur and continues the Buddyfight against Gao. In the end, Gao wins, and Shosetsu is cleared of his crime.
33	"Gao vs. Rouga! Round Two! / Rouga Aragami's Counterattack!!"; Transliteration: "Gyakushū! Aragami Rouga!!" (Japanese: 逆襲！荒神ロウガ！！)	August 23, 2014
Gao and Rouga face off in the final game of the 5-on-5 match. Despite knowing about Rouga's identity as Wolf, Gao still intends to befriend him. To do so, Gao battles with his new Dungeon World deck while using card effects to play games of rock-paper-scissors with Rouga. When both Gao's and Rouga's life points drop to zero, Gao uses a card effect to restore his life points and wins the fight. As agreed before, Rouga returns Kiri to Gao, and while he does not see Gao as a friend, Rouga does recognize him as a worthy rival. Then, Tasuku tries to arrest Rouga for his crimes, but he is denied the usage of Future Force. Rouga takes this chance to escape, and Tasuku is relieved of his Buddyfight Police duties.
34	"Defenders of Darkness! / The Army of Darkness! Disaster!!"; Transliteration: "Yami no Gundan! Dizasutā!!" (Japanese: 闇の軍団！ディザスター！！)	August 30, 2014
With Kiri safely retrieved, Gao and his friends return home and review the Buddyfights they had at Sengoku Academy. Then, after revealing that he willingly went to Sengoku Academy with Rouga, Kiri decides to fight Gao as a test to his newly learned skills. Despite Kiri's improved Buddyfight skills and help from Asmodai, Gao still wins. After the fight, Axia decides to leave to search for a buddy of his own. Meanwhile, Kyoya observes Gao's activities along with Rouga, Sophia, Magoroku, and four more mysterious comrades...
35	"Mysterious Hero! Captain Answer!"; Transliteration: "Nazo no Hīrō! Kyaputen Ansā!!" (Japanese: 謎のヒーロー！キャプテン・アンサー！！)	September 6, 2014
After filling out documents at Buddy Police Headquarters, Gao and Drum are being driven home by officers Tsurugi Takihara and Stella Watson. Suddenly, an escaped convict attacks, and the group arrives to the scene of the crime. Takihara engages the criminal in a Buddyfight while Gao, Drum, and Stella watch. With his Hero World deck, Takihara defeats the criminal, who is revealed to be Demon Inzaidi. He has one of his monsters attack the surrounding area and take Stella as hostage. Inzaidi demands for Captain Answer, a famous hero who mysteriously disappeared a long time ago, to show himself so he can get revenge on him. As Takihara tries to make himself the target of Inzaidi's attacks to protect Stella, Captain Answer appears and saves Stella. Also using a Hero World deck, Captain Answer then beats Inzaidi in a Buddyfight and bids farewell to Gao and the group, with no one knowing that Answer's true identity is one of Gao's teacher, Mr. Neginoyama.
36	"Ikarino's Fantastic Dungeon!"; Transliteration: "Ikarino-kōchō no Suteki na Danjon!" (Japanese: 怒野校長の素敵なダンジョン！)	September 13, 2014
Gao's class is introduced to a new substitute teacher: the eccentric Elf Kabala, who is really part of Kyoya's evil group, Disaster. When Gao mentions he has an "ultimate" Dungeon World deck, the school principal Ikarino overhears him and transports Gao and his classmates into an inescapable dungeon. In order for them to leave, Ikarino must be defeated in a Buddyfight. Gao manages to do so with his Dungeon World deck, and the entire class returns to the homeroom.
37	"Medusa Unleashed! / The Woman who Brought the Medusa!"; Transliteration: "Medūsa wo Tsureta Onna!" (Japanese: メデューサを連れた女！)	September 20, 2014
Another member of Kyoya's Disaster team, Terumi Kuchinawa, poses herself as a student at Gao's school. She intends to use Disaster Force to take control of Gao's and Kiri's minds, but each of attempts to do so are unwittingly thwarted by Tetsuya and Asmodai. Irritated, Terumi confronts Tetsuya and Asmodai, who tells Terumi that she is really jealous of Tetsuya's free-spirited attitude. Although Terumi defeats Tetsuya in a Buddyfight, she still feels frustrated and only tells Tetsuya to leave her alone. Meanwhile, another Disaster member, Davide Yamazaki, moves into action...
38	"Fenrir of Fate!"; Transliteration: "Unmei no Fenriru!" (Japanese: 運命のフェンリル！)	September 27, 2014
The buddy fighter that steadily grew, Kiri. Kiri that wants to use Legend World and skillfully constructs a deck, he wants to test the power of the deck, so he heads for the Castle. Kiri gets a phone call. The excited Kiri, readies himself to request to have a match with Kazane. Just what is Kiri's true motive that he in such a hurry for...?
39	"Kiri Strikes Back! / Dear, Gao-Kun"; Transliteration: "Haikei, Gaokun" (Japanese: 拝啓，牙王君)	October 4, 2014
Gao suddenly receives a letter. He energetically knows it's Kiri and he hurriedly goes to that area after school. However, Gao's joy is cruelly crushed. Kiri, that was waiting, suddenly the mood changes, and in his hands is a dark core deck case.
40	"The Terrifying Dragon World! / Terror! Darkness Dragon World!!"; Transliteration: "Kyōfu! Dākunesu Doragon Wārudo!!" (Japanese: 恐怖！ダークネスドラゴンワールド！！)	October 11, 2014
While inside Aibou Academy, Todoroki Genma invites Kemura. The person that was awaiting them, was really a member of Disaster, Magoroku Shidou. Shidou uses the not yet known world, 'Darkness Dragon World', he fearlessly laughs at the previously wounded Duel Sieger. That conclusion of surplus is...
41	"Roaring Slash! Gargantua Punisher! / Explosion! Roaring Slash!! Gargantua Punisher!!"; Transliteration: "Sakuretsu! Gōzan!! Garuganchua Panishā!!" (Japanese: 炸裂！轟斬！！ガルガンチュア・パニッシャー！！)	October 18, 2014
Disaster's Davide Yamazaki caused a lot of trouble with Gao's friends. He arrives at the Buddy Fest taking place at Castle, and instigates a match with Gao. During the match, Davide attempts to psych out Gao to win the match by cheating, but is unaware of Gao's new trump card.
42	"Disaster at Twilight! / The Grim Reaper Comes at Twilight"; Transliteration: "Ōmagatoki ni shinigami Kitaru" (Japanese: 逢魔が刻に死神来たる)	October 25, 2014
Inside children, they fear the unidentifiable being, the "Grim Reaper". At twilight, a buddyfighter that challenges people to knock them down at deserted places, and snatches their Buddy away before they leave. Zanya happens to come across the Grim Reaper at the park, in order to capture the Grim Reaper, he starts a match with his buddy on the line.
43	"Tasuku Takes Charge! / Tasuku's Resignation! Goodbye, Buddy Police!!"; Transliteration: "Tasuku no Kakugo! Saraba Badi Porisu!!" (Japanese: タスクの覚悟！さらばバディポリス！！)	November 1, 2014
Tasuku was restricted from his Buddy Police's strength, and he was starting to worry about his own justice. When he tries to ignore Disaster's threats and continues to fight against them...
44	"Disaster Times Two! / 2 against 1 Deathmatch! Jack's Super Evolution!!"; Transliteration: "Ni tai ichi no Desumacchi! Jakku Chou Shinka!!" (Japanese: 2対1のデスマッチ！ジャック超進化！！)	November 8, 2014
Kyoya Gaen puts a mysterious card in Tasuku's deck. Tasuku fights against Davide and Shido. It turns out that the card is a special rare with a forbidden power. Meanwhile Gao and the Grim Reaper are having a battle. Will Gao get through to Kiri and will Tasuku win? It's buddyfighting like you've never seen it.
45	"Luminize! Exploding Dragon Fang!!"; Transliteration: "Ruminaizu! Baku Ryūga!!" (Japanese: ルミナイズ！爆竜牙！！)	November 15, 2014
Elf Kabala VS Gao Mikado. Kabala is shown to be a scientist that can use the Dark Core's power to manipulate monsters. Kabala uses the monsters that the God of Death (Grim Reaper) had stolen, and Zanya's Buddy, Tsukikage appears in front of Gao not beside Kabala. Baku gives Gao the deck he newly made, "Explosive Dragon Fang", to not take back the stolen Tsukikage!
46	"Balle du Soleil Reborn! / Birth! Balle Soleil Reborn!"; Transliteration: "Tanjō! Shinsei Barusoreiyu!!" (Japanese: 誕生！新生バルソレイユ！！)	November 22, 2014
Kyoya Gaen sponsored, and chose the 8 best teams to Buddyfight in it, the "Gaen Cup" was announced after a meeting. Gao Mikado was invited, but he hesitates to participate due to being worried about the dangers of Disaster, because of that, his friends gather to fight alongside him. But, Zanya Kisaragi strictly informs that Tetsuya Kurodake's deck's strength is not enough."...
47	"The Gaen Cup Begins! / Festival of the Century!! The Gaen Cup!!"; Transliteration: "Seiki no Saiten! Gaen Kappu!!" (Japanese: 世紀の祭典！臥炎カップ！！)	November 29, 2014
The thing that the whole world was expectantly waiting, the curtains of the festival of the century, the "Gaen Cup" finally opens. The Gaen Cup uses the Fighting Stage at Aibou Academy and reconstructed it, the 8 teams, the 24 fighters gathered there. The passionate area's climax is started with Team Goddess, Amanosuzu Suzuha's team. Bal Soleil tightens their guard, but how will Kisaragi Zanya fight against a female!?
48	"The Dancing Demon Takes on Medusa! / Dancing Fight! Demon King vs. Medusa"; Transliteration: "Danshingu Faito! Maō vs Medūsa" (Japanese: ダンシングファイト！魔王vsメデューサ)	December 6, 2014
The second match of the Gaen Cup has begun as the fighters are Team Goddesses mysterious fighter, Terumi Kuchinawa versus Balle du Soleil`s Tetsuya Kurodake. Terumi must prove herself to be strong or else she will be turned back into a nobody before anyone knew her, but Tetsuya has a plan to set Terumi free of her shackles as he confesses his love for her throughout the fight. Will love prevail or will Terumi`s identity stop even the Power of Love?!
49	"Paruko Takes The Stage! / W-W-W-What!? A Real Conditioned Fight!!"; Transliteration: "Nanananto! Jikkyō Faito!!" (Japanese: なななんと！実況ファイト！！)	December 13, 2014
Team Balle du Soleil reaches their final match against Team Goddess in the Gaen Cup, and they have a surprising fighter who knows all of Gao's strategies, and even the cards in his deck! How will he win this one?
50	"Attack of Team Purgatory!"; Transliteration: "Chīmu Rengoku no Shingeki!" (Japanese: チーム煉獄の進撃！)	December 20, 2014
The next matchup in the Gaen Cup begins, and it's Team Sengoku vs. Team Purgatory. A surprise in their lineup makes Rouga angry at Kyoya!
51	"The Tiger Returns! / The Tiger Returns! That Fight is Destiny!!"; Transliteration: "Kaetteki Tora! Sono tatakai ha Desutinī!!" (Japanese: 帰ってきた虎！その闘いはデスティニー！！)	December 27, 2014
Team Sefukai vs Team Destiny. Noboru returns from the United States with his evolved Dragon Knight deck. However, Gemma also has improved through training.
52	"Generations Collide! Drum Breaker Dragon! / Challenge to Father! Drum Breaker Dragon!"; Transliteration: "Chichi ni Idome! Doramu Bureikā Doragon!" (Japanese: 父に挑め！ドラムブレイカー・ドラゴン！)	January 10, 2015
Team Balle du Soleil safely survived the first round of the Gaen Cup, and celebrated at the Mikado Residence. A sudden visitor appeared there, and that visitor was Drum's father. Gao's father, unexpectedly becomes Father Drum's Buddy, and started to help Gao and Drum to strengthen their bond. The fathers' thoughts that they want to convey to their sons is...
53	"Sword of Nothingness! Distortion Punisher!"; Transliteration: "Zetsumu no Ken Disutōshon Panisshā!" (Japanese: 絶無の剣ディストーション・パニッシャー！)	January 17, 2015
The first match of the Gaen Cup Semifinals is between Team Destiny's Noboru Kodo and Team Purgatory's Purgatory Knight. Purgatory Knight stands with his Buddy, Demios Sword Dragon, Leader of the Purgatory Knights and cruelly fights Noboru. But Zanya manages to see the face of the person inside the armor. Finally, Purgatory Knight reveals his true colors...
54	"Wolf versus Fox! A Battle of Instinct! / Wolf vs. Fox! Man's Determination!!"; Transliteration: "Ōkami VS Kitsune! Otoko-tachi no ketsui!!" (Japanese: 狼VS狐! 男たちの決意!!)	January 24, 2015
Team Destiny's and Team Purgatory's next match is between Jin Magatsu and Rouga Aragami. They clash into each other with different feelings for different friends. Meanwhile, the Purgatory Knight Tasuku confronts with Gao, and Tasuku's natural intention in Disaster shocks Gao. Tasuku tells him his previous decision, after knowing that, Gao...
55	"Balle du Soleil Collapses! / Tetsuya Struggles Alone! The Collapse of Balle du Soleil!?"; Transliteration: "Tetsuya Koritsumuen! Baru Soreiyu no hōkai!?" (Japanese: テツヤ孤立無援！バルソレイユ崩壊！？)	January 31, 2015
The Gaen Cup's second Semifinal. Team Balle du Soleil VS Team Darkness Masterminds. Now knowing Purgatory Knight Tasuku's true intentions, Gao and Zanya were heavily disturbed. In order to change the heavy atmosphere in Team Balle du Soleil, Tetsuya Kurodake takes the first match against Devita. Even now Tetsuya loudly sings and dances, and finally his message reaches to his friends. Even though Tetsuya loses, Zanya ties up the score against Magoroku Shido. Now the stage is set for Gao and Gremlin...
56	"Master versus Apprentice Battle! Death Tallica vs. Explosive Dragon Fang!! / Showdown Between Teacher and Student! Death Talika vs. Explosive Dragon Fang!!"; Transliteration: "Shitei Taiketsu! Desu Tarika vs. Baku Ryūga!!" (Japanese: 師弟対決！デスタリカvs爆竜牙！！)	February 7, 2015
Gremlin's big match, as he is Disaster's deck builder and Baku's teacher. "The fighter is a Deck Builder's addition." Gremlin declares, as his deck also made Baku astonished. As the fight begins, Gremlin expresses his additive and thoughts of where Baku is now. As Gremlin's buddy, Death Tallika, is summoned, Gao still believes in Baku and fights against incredible odds. Which deck builder's belief will win? Death Talika's wall must be smashed down!
57	"Take Back the Buddy Police! / Take Back the Buddy Police!"; Transliteration: "Badi Porisu Dakkan Sakusen!" (Japanese: バディポリス奪還作戦！)	February 14, 2015
While the world is heated up by the Gaen Cup, Takihara, Stella and Commander I make their move in order to restore right to the Buddy Police. But they are stopped by Nobari, Sueroku and Magoroku Shido. As they were cornered on the rooftop of Buddy Police HQ by Magoroku with his Disaster Force active, as though all hope was lost, the hero of justice, Captain Answer appears!?
58	"Gaen Cup Final Round! Tetsuya's Choice! / The Gaen Cup final! Tetsuya's choice!" Transliteration: "Gaen Kappu kesshou! Tetsuya no sentaku!" (Japanese: 臥炎カップ決勝！テツヤの選択！！)	February 21, 2015
The Gaen Cup's final, Team Balle Du Soliel VS Team Purgatory. Tetsuya's opponent, Sofia met him before their match to discuss something. She was the one that took Kuchinawa Terumi's memories, and told Tetsuya that if he forfeited the match, she would give Terumi's memories back. While Tetsuya was deeply troubled by this, Sofia shows off her real moves as a Buddyfighter. Tetsuya, depressed at the thought, is contorted by Asmodai and is encouraged to come back and win after seeing what looked like Terumi in the stands.
59	"Rouga Leaves the Pack! / Rouga's Broken Friendship!"; Transliteration: "Rouga, Yuujou ni Chiru!" (Japanese: ロウガ，友情に散る！)	February 28, 2015
The next match of the Gaen Cup is between Kisaragi Zanya and Aragami Rouga. Zanya was for Tasuku's sake, Rouga was for Kyoya's sake, both of them had a lot of things to tell their respective other's. Their trusted justice clashes in this match. Just what was the things they wanted to convey to their friends? After their friends knew, the moves they made were...
60	"Gao and Tasuku's Epic Battle! / Tasuku Ryuuenji VS Mikado Gao!"; Transliteration: "Ryuuenji Tasuku VS Mikado Gao!" (Japanese: 龍炎寺タスクvs未門牙王！)	March 7, 2015
The Gaen Cup's final big match. Gao Mikado VS Tasuku Ryuenji. Gao's first opponent was Tasuku, and this was their fated rematch. Gao the Sun Banchou, and Tasuku, whose eyes were not awoken, fought with all their strength. Meanwhile, Takihara and the rest at the Buddy Police, in order to stop Kyouya's plans, advance towards Kabala's laboratory.
61	"Eternal Rivals!"; Transliteration: "Eien no Ribaru-tachi!" (Japanese: 永遠のライバルたち！)	March 14, 2015
Kyoya Gaen's plan activates during the final match of the Gaen Cup. A giant monster is seen in Darkness Dragon World's Gate that appeared in the sky above the Fighting Stage. The crowd becomes noisy, and at that moment, Tasuku tries to use his Disaster Force to destroy the monster, but it fails because of a program in his dark core so he cannot hurt any darkness dragon monsters. Then in Gao finally uses Future Force and now he looks like the sun fighter and he uses a spell card and sends the monster back to its world. Finally Kyoya's ambitions are made clear. What did the Dark Core's power invite to the world?
62	"Kyoya's World!"; Transliteration: "Kyōya no Sekai!" (Japanese: キョウヤの世界！)	March 21, 2015
Gao Mikado challenges Kyoya Gaen to a Buddyfight. Challenging Kyoya while he is referred to as the messiah is the same as turning against the whole world. In order to let them know about the Society's bad intentions. And the night before the match, Tasuku had visited Gao...
63	"Shadow of Demise!"; Transliteration: "Shūen o tsugeru mono!" (Japanese: 終焉を告げる者！)	March 28, 2015
The match that decides the world's fate finally starts. Kyoya uses a special flag, "Dragon Ein", and reveals Demonic Dragon of Demise, Azi Dahaka's full form. How will Gao fight against the formidable enemy without seeing it before? And again, while the fight was going on, Tasuku and Kiri enter Kyoya's hideout, intending to prevent Kyoya's plot from advancing.
64	"Break to the Future! / Break Out Your Future Card!!"; Transliteration: "Hanate! Fyūchā Kādo!!" (Japanese: 放て！フューチャーカード！！)	April 4, 2015
The world is excited about Kyoya's overwhelming power, and the Dark Core gained strength. If Gao lost to Kyoya now, the Darkness Dragon World's gate would fully open, and the world would come to an end. Gao is heavily cornered, but does he still believe in the future? He opens the path to the future with his Buddy. "Break out your future card!!"

== Future Card Buddyfight Hundred ==
Opening theme

- "Luminize" by fripSide (eps. 1-21) (Original Japanese) / (eps. 1-48) (English Dub)
- "Beyond the Limit" by Hideyuki Takahashi (eps. 22–48)

Ending theme

- "Buddy Lights" by Saitou Souma (eps. 1-21) (Original Japanese) / (eps. 1-50) (English Dub)
- "Milky 100 World" by Milky Holmes (eps. 22–50)

No.	Title	Original release date
1 (65)	"An Overwhelming Threat! / Unbelievable Threat!"; Transliteration: "Totetsumonai Kyōi!" (Japanese: とてつもない脅威！)	April 11, 2015
A ginormous dragon twines around Chou-Tokyo's Sky Tower; its name is Fifth Omni Lord Dragon, Tenbu. He says, 'In order to prevent an "overwhelming threat", I have come to earth to search for the strongest Buddyfighter.' This tale's main protagonist, Gao Mikado, starts a fight with his Buddy Drum Bunker Dragon and Tenbu. Gao has a new Impact! Drum has a new form! The tale of 'Buddyfight Hundred' starts now.
2 (66)	"The Hundred Demons Attack! Protect Tenbu! / The Hundred Demons Invasion! Protect Tenbu!!"; Transliteration: "Hyakki Shūrai! Tenbu o Mamore!!" (Japanese: 百鬼襲来！天武を守れ!!)	April 18, 2015
At the school Gao goes to, cases of people having their decks stolen starts to happen. As a Young Buddy Cop, Gao goes there to investigate, but he's led to a fighting stage in a different dimension by a dark power. A mysterious Buddyfighter named 'Death Shido' has the Hundred Demon, 'Ice Prison Emperor, Cocytus Greed' as his Buddy. He challenges Gao to a fight.
3 (67)	"Those Who Hate The Sun! / The One Who Hates the Sun"; Transliteration: "Taiyō Kirau Mono" (Japanese: 太陽を嫌う者)	April 25, 2015
Suddenly, Buddy Police Instructor Earl Dawn comes out of a strange coffin which lands in front of Gao and his friends. Earl Dawn strictly says that "A child can't handle the duties of a Buddy Police." Meanwhile, a Hundred Demon named 'Two-Headed Demon Dog, Orthros' appears in Aibo Academy. The students start to fight each other because of the smoke let out by Orthros. While thinking of a solution, Gao is suddenly interrupted, not by 'Death Shido', but by 'Death Sofia'!? Gao will arrest her while using Hero World, in order to show his role as a Buddy Police.
4 (68)	"Trouble at Buddy Fest! / Wind and Clouds! Buddy Festa!!"; Transliteration: "Fūun! Badi Fesuta!!" (Japanese: 風雲！バディフェスタ!!)	May 2, 2015
Count Dawn suggests Gao gets a day off after Gao begins to look sluggish. Not knowing what to do with the free time, Gao heads to the Card Shop where he finds out Buddy Fest is taking place, Gao becomes an instructor at Buddy Fest, but Shido has other ideas. Shido attaches 100 demon Kalavinka to Paruko, and then Shido traps Paruko and Gao in the darkness barrier to battle it out. Can Gao continue to protect Tenbu and trap a new hundred demon in the process?
5 (69)	"The Life of a Buddy Police Trainee! / No Sleep No Rest! Buddy Police Apprentice!!"; Transliteration: "Fumin Fukyū! Badi Porisu minarai!!" (Japanese: 不眠不休！ バディポリス見習い！！)	May 9, 2015
With the threat of the hundred demons continuing to grow, the Buddy Police are given no choice but to go all out with no breaks. Tetsuya begins to notice Gao's deteriorating health and wonders how he can help. When hundred demon Grand Wilderness appears Tetsuya rushes Gao and Drum to the scene, who are unable to travel themselves due to sleep deprivation and starvation. Shido traps the group in the darkness barrier, and Gao proves too weary to battle. Tetsuya steps in to protect Tenbu. Will Tetsuya get one step closer to becoming the champion of magic world, or will the hundred demons finally claim Tenbu? The end result will have an expected consequence for Tetsuya, as he becomes a new Buddy Police trainee in the process.
6 (70)	"Brothers in Arms! The Battle of Dragon Brainbaltes! / Showdown between Siblings! Zanya VS Super Case Dragon, Bren Bartis!!"; Transliteration: "Kyōdai Taiketsu! Zanya VS Chōgōryū Buren Barutisu!!" (Japanese: 兄弟対決！ 斬夜VS超合竜ブレンバルティス！！)	May 16, 2015
Zanya determines he wants to become a Buddy Police officer. Akatuski overhears him and becomes jealous that Gao chose Tetsuya before Zanya. The next day Akatsuki confronts Gao about it. Zanya sees it as betrayal and declares, "You're shameless." Akatsuki decides to run away. Zanya tries to pursue him, but in the process he runs into the escaped convict Kibaltes, who has been recruited by Shido to takedown Gao. Kibaltes summons two hundred demons: Akaoni and Aooni. A battle ensues. Kibaltes has Akaoni and Aooni merge to become the dangerous Dragon Brainbaltes. Sophia also tries to stack the deck against Zanya by having some of his fan girls appear in front of him, activating Zanya's fear. Luckily Akatuski had also been trapped in the darkness barrier. Akatuski picks up the girls and takes them away from Zanya. Zanya is able to activate his final phase to defeat Kibaltes. After Zanya's win Count Dawn officially brings in Zanya and deputizes him as a Buddy Police fighter. He also renames the Buddy Police Trainees the Buddy Police Youth.
7 (71)	"Meow, Meow? Cait Sith in Boots! / Meow Meow? Boots Wearing Kettoshi!"; Transliteration: "Nyanya? Chōka o Haita Kettoshī!" (Japanese: ニャニャ？ 長靴を履いたケットシー！)	May 23, 2015
Emergency Buddy Police News appeared and they send Gao. Gao wondered what kind of strong monster will he face this time, and continues to fly. But, when he arrives, the one that was there... seemed to be a cat. Gao thinks that "For now I should quickly capture it", the cat introduces itself as "I'm Cait Sith in Boots!" and challenges Gao to a fight. It looks cute but... is it really strong?
8 (72)	"The Demon Swordsman Draws Closer! Tenbu Abducted! / Creeping Demon Knight! Stolen Tenbu!!"; Transliteration: "Shinobiyoru Ma Kenshi! Ubawareta Tenbu!!" (Japanese: 忍び寄る魔剣士！ 奪われた天武！！)	May 30, 2015
In order to steal Tenbu Ikazuchi sends out a new Hundred Demon, Dekalfar Demon Swordsman Heim. Heim takes Baku and Kuguru as hostage and demands Gao hand him Tenbu. In exchange he'll free Baku and Kuguru from hundred demon control. While Gao thinks about what to do Tenbu changes into his card form and goes into Heim's hand himself. Having gotten Tenbu, Heim escapes. Baku and Kuguru are manipulated by the Hundred Demons and attack Gao, but Zanya and Tetsuya are sent in to fight them instead. Gao pursues Heim and gets trapped in a darkness barrier by Death Shido, leading to 3 thousand demon battles simultaneously. As if that were not enough the demon hunter Ban Kazama and his buddy Dragon Ricky arrive on the scene wanting a hundred demon for their own agenda.
9 (73)	"Crossnize! Star Dragon World! / An Alliance of Stars! Star Dragon World!!"; Transliteration: "Hoshi Gattai! Sutā Doragon Wārudo!!" (Japanese: 星合体！スタードラゴンワールド！！)	June 6, 2015
Gao and Drum chase the Hundred Demon that snatched Tenbu, "Dekalfar Demon Swordsman, Heim" into Dragon World. While at Dragon World, they come across the fight between Tasuku and Purgatory Knight. Tasuku is defeated Purgatory Knight, and while he is feeling depressed Gao told him everything that was happening on earth. Including Gao becoming a Buddy Police Trainee and the Hundred Demons. The two feel down as they think that they cannot become who they aim to be. "Instead of becoming someone else, become a stronger version of yourself, Jack says. Thanks to Jack's words Tasuku stands up, full of excitement. Tasuku enters into a rematch with Purgatory Knight and finally defeats him. With the mission of defeating his past self complete, Dynamis appears and bestows upon Tasuku and Jack Knife the power of Star Dragon World. Drum contacts the other dragons and learns where Heim is hidden. The two go and challenge him to a rematch, with Tasku following. Heim tries to use a second body clone, but Drum uses one of his seven skills to find the real Heim and then another to keep Heim from pursuing. With Heim cornered Tasuku challenges him to a match. The winner gets Tenbu, and if Heim loses he will become another prisoner of the Buddy Police.
10 (74)	"Hoo-hah! A Hundred Thousand Ziun Years in Search of Friends! / Chest! Jieun's Thousand Years of Searching for Comrades!!"; Transliteration: "Chesuto! Nakama o sagashite Jiun Mannen!!" (Japanese: チェスト！仲間を捜してジウン万年！)	June 13, 2015
First Omni Beast Lord Ziun awakens from his ten thousand year slumber. He wishes to look for the friends that have gotten lost during his slumber. Ikazuchi craves Ziun, thjinking he will taste like Tenbu does, and sends Shid oto go claim him. Shido arrives and tricks Ziun into fighting for him instead of taking him to Ikazuchi. Shido elieves that if Ziun wins, he'll be able to take Tenbu and Ziun to Ikazuchi simultaneously. Meanwhile Gao sleeps late due on a Sunday, forgetting he has make-up lessons scheduled. Zanya arrives and tries to wake-up Gao but fails. Zanya leaves frustrated, but Tetsuya comes over afterwards and manages to wake up Gao and accompany him to the Academy. Death Shido waits for Gao at the Academy, but Zanya arrives first and Ziun mistakes that Tetsuya is Gao. Ziun challenges Zanya to a fight. Tetsuya is defeating with shocking ease. Ziun then challenges Gao to a battle. With advice from Tetsuya Gao is able to form the Gao formation with his Hero World deck and defeat Ziun. The Buddy Police Youth decide to let Ziun wander the streets freely after learning he is not a hundred demons card, but in the process they forget their make-up lessons and leave the Academy.
11 (75)	"The Wandering Hundred Demons' Hunter!"; Transliteration: "Sasurai no Hyakki Huntā" (Japanese: さすらいの百鬼ハンター)	June 20, 2015
Ban Kazama calls himself the Hundred Demon Hunter. If it's to hunt Hundred Demons, he does not choose other plans. The Buddy Police mark him as soon as they hear that, and they also urge Gao to be more careful. Meanwhile, Shido gives Ban the Hundred Demon and they discuss the plan to steal Tenbu. But the plan sadly fails. Ban takes the Hundred Demon card away. Ban goes to a deserted storehouse and smiles as he views the Hundred Demon card. Just what is his goal?
12 (76)	"Win and Advance! 1024 Consecutive Fights!!"; Transliteration: "Kachinuke! Ichi Zero Ni Yon Rensen!!" (Japanese: 勝ち抜け！一〇二四連戦！！)	June 27, 2015
The Suzuha Amanosuzu Organization is going to hold a party on Sunday. Baku and Kuguru are excited about it, but Gao says that he has Buddy Police work throughout the day. "We don't even have free time to eat Takoyaki..." Both Drum and Gao complain. Suddenly, the splitting image of Suzuha's robots appear in front of them and they head to the Castle to see Suzuha. "Surely Suzuha appeared..." They thought. But they see a Hundred Demon possessing her. The shadow of Mysterious Dekarabia is floating near her. Gao and Drum fall into a Dungeon Stage and are forced to fight 1024 fights.
13 (77)	"Parade of Hundred Demons! Terror of the Thunder Mine! / The Parade of the Hundred Demons! Terror of the Depth Charge!!"; Transliteration: "Hyakki Yagyō! Bakurai no Kyōfu!!" (Japanese: 百鬼夜行！爆雷の恐怖！！)	July 4, 2015
Finding himself nearly falling unconscious from fatigue, Gao struggles in his Fight against Death Shido (12 damage to 3). During the battle Gao senses Taskuku, gets back his willpower and wins spectacularly. Meanwhile Count Dawn equips the double attack ability on all his monsters and is able to defeat Suzuha. Fed up with Death Shido Ikazuchi decides to make a move himself and attacks Gao, saying "I'll go eat Tenbu!" However, Asmodai stands in the way. Ikazuchi battles Asmodai with a mysterious flag, the Parade of Hundred Demons card. Asmodai battles Ikazuchi, and the battle causes Ikazuchi's buddy Yamigedo to evolve. Asmodai loses half of his power during the battle, but Tasuku shows up and prevents Ikazuchi and Yamigedo from getting any stronger. After the battle ends Suzuha is attacked by the press. She reveals the secret Count Dawn has hidden. Ikazuchi and his buddy, Yamigedo, have tried to attack Earth once before. At that time Yamigedo was sealed by the 8 Omni Lords. Now, in order to beat him, the 8 Omni Lords will be needed once again. Some of them have lost their memories. Some of them are not awakened, and some have transformed themselves into humans. Count Dawn confirms to Commander I he is one of the Omni Lords, and during the clip scenes it shows Dragon Ricky is likely one of the Omni Lords who has forgotten his past. It also shows Kiri and Kazane are among the humans that could have ties to the Omni Lords.
14 (78)	"Yamigedo! The Fiend that Devours All! / The Beast That Eats Everything! Yamigedo!!"; Transliteration: "Subete o Kurau Kemono! Yamigedō!!" (Japanese: 全てを喰らう獣！ヤミゲドウ！！)	July 11, 2015
15 (79)	"Nanomachine Ninja Showdown! Byakuya VS Tsukikage!!"; Transliteration: "Nanomashin Ninja Taiketsu! Byakuya VS Tsukikage!!" (Japanese: ナノマシン忍者対決！白夜VS月影！！)	July 18, 2015
16 (80)	"I'm the Hero! Justice Drum! / I'm a Hero! Justice Drum!!"; Transliteration: "Oira ga Hīrō! Jasutisu Doramu!!" (Japanese: おいらがヒーロー！ジャスティス・ドラム！！)	July 25, 2015
17 (81)	"Tasuku Undercover! Buddy Fight Club! / Tasuku Sneaks In! The Buddyfight Club!!"; Transliteration: "Tasuku Sennyu! Badifaito Kurabu!!" (Japanese: タスク潜入！バディファイトクラブ！！)	August 1, 2015
The underground organization known as "Buddyfight Club" holds a ceremony with illegal buddy fights. The Buddy Police hears the rumor of their sponsor being an Omni Lord. Tasuku is immediately ordered to head to Chou Nagoya, where the ceremony is held. After some time of investigating, Tasuku stumbles upon Sofia and a mysterious boy doing business. Suddenly, Rouga Aragami appears. He activates his Disaster Force and attacks the mysterious boy. Tasuku tries to control the situation, but the mysterious boy gives both Tasuku and Rouga the Buddyfight Club's invitation and disappears. Tasuku witnesses a shocking spectacle...!
18 (82)	"Punishment for Disrespect! Infinite Death Crest! / The Right to Strike! Infinity Death Crest!!"; Transliteration: "Kiri-sute Gomen! Infiniti Desu Kuresuto!!" (Japanese: 切り捨て御免！死ヶ峰無限剣（インフィニティ・デスクレスト）！)	August 8, 2015
A brawling incident happened with two mysterious people. One wore a conical hat and the other had a black felt hat. After the Buddy Police's investigation, they reported that the person with the felt hat had 2 horns. Since Gao was still on break, Tetsuya and Asmodai go investigate. While on the way, they meet Zakoyama and his friends attacking people. And the two mysterious people appeared as usual. Tetsuya wanted to confirm the person was an Omni Lord, but the guy in the conical hat said that the Second Omni Lord was Asmodai. He presses them with evidence.
19 (83)	"Ghoul Deity Combine! Gojinmaru! / Ghoul Combination! Gojimaru!!"; Transliteration: "Onigami Gattai! Gōjinmaru!!" (Japanese: 鬼神合体！剛刃丸！！)	August 15, 2015
Zanya finally finds the First Omni Beast Lord, Ziun and asks him to join his deck. However, "You still do not understand the true power of Katana World." Ziun declares after Zanya loses to him countless times. He then leaves Zanya. Zanya suffers. He then suddenly meets Jin Megatsu who gives him advice and also entrusts him with a card. Zanya raises his head after Jin's advice and finds Ziun again. Ziun accepts Zanya's challenge once again after seeing his determination.
20 (84)	"The Sad Earth Lord! A Requiem for Daichi!!"; Transliteration: "Kanashimi no Chi-Ō Daichi ni Sasagu Chinkoka!!" (Japanese: 哀しみの地王！大地に捧ぐ鎮魂歌！！)	August 22, 2015
Gao's health is becoming worse as he still refuses the despair and fear thanks to being beaten by Ikazuchi and losing Tenbu. "First of all, you need to admit it." Count Dawn tells Gao. But actually, Count Dawn still did not move on from his bitter past. After being told of Count Dawn's past, Gao heads with Dawn to move on together. He fights with Kazane Fujimiya. What's Dawn's connection to Kazane and why has he hidden his sad past?
21 (85)	"Farewell Star Guardian Jackknife! / An Eternal Farewell! Star Guardian Jackknife!!"; Transliteration: "Eien no Wakare! Sutā Gādian Jakkunaifu!!" (Japanese: 永遠の別れ！超星護（スター・ガーディアン）ジャックナイフ！！)	August 29, 2015
22 (86)	"Unorthodox Arts, Shoraiabare Kendachi!"; Transliteration: "Gedou Ougi! Shoraiabare Kendachi!!" (Japanese: 外道奥義！召雷暴神立ち！！)	September 5, 2015
Noboru Kodo has returned from America. In order to cheer up Gao, Noboru gives him a written challenge. Gao was happy about Noboru being back, but he still couldn't use his Dragon World deck. Suddenly out of nowhere, Sofia and Ikazuchi appear. Ikazuchi attacks Gao, but, Noboru calmly steps between the two.
23 (87)	"A Battle of Heroes! / Clash! Hero vs Dark Hero!!"; Transliteration: "Gekitotsu! Hīrō vs Dāku Hīrō!!" (Japanese: 激突！ヒーローvsダークヒーロー！！)	September 12, 2015
Noboru is kidnapped by "First Knight of the Apocalypse, Gratos". The Buddy Police chase after him. Meanwhile, Mukuro Shigamine suddenly appears in front of Ban. He tells Ban to hand the Omni Lord's Crest over. "I don't know what that is." Ban says, but his buddy Rikki's body glows as it reacted to the Omni Lord's Crest. While Tasuku and Zanya didn't think much of it, Shigamine tries to kidnap Rikki. But, Gao rushes to the scene.
24 (88)	"Descent of the Fire Lord! Burn Nova Revived! / The Fire Lord's Advent! The Revival of Burn Nova!!"; Transliteration: "En-Ō Kōrin! Fukkatsu no Bān Nova!!" (Japanese: 炎王降臨！復活のバーンノヴァ！！)	September 19, 2015
To make sure that Ricky was an Omni Lord, Drum searches for Ban and Ricky. When Drum finds Ricky and asks for the truth, Ricky looked like he was hiding something. When Gratos appears, he didn't go for Ricky, he went for Ban. The moment Ban sees Gratos, he begins to act violently. Ricky decides what to do and he approaches Ban with the Omni Lord's Crest in hand. After that, the Omni Lord's Crest flashes, and Fourth Omni Fire Lord, Burn Nova appears there.
25 (89)	"Farewell, Buddyfight"; Transliteration: "Saraba, Badi Faito" (Japanese: さらば，バディファイト)	September 26, 2015
Gao tells everyone that he won't Buddyfight anymore. While all his friends were dumbfounded, Drum told Tasuku something before leaving. Without Drum, countless boring days passed. One day, Tatsuto Souwa asks Gao to look through his deck. "I'm starting to love Buddyfight even more." Tatsuto says with bright eyes. When Gao saw those eyes, he's overflowed with a feeling he had forgotten. After noticing, he picked a Dragon World card up and started to build a deck. Tasuku was visiting, and he hands over Gao's deck "Crimson Dragon Fist".
26 (90)	"Luminize! Super Dragon Fifth Omni Formation!! / Luminize! Super Dragon Pentagon Formation!!"; Transliteration: "Ruminaize! Chō-Ryū-go Kakujin!!" (Japanese: ルミナイズ！超竜五角陣！！)	October 3, 2015
After being able to use his Dragon World deck again, Gao disobeys Count Dawn's orders and goes to Ikazuchi's hideout to save Noboru. Meanwhile, Ikazuchi sensed that Gao was coming and he waits there to devour him. Baku puts together a deck called 'Super Dragon Fifth Omni Formation' that contained the Fifth Omni Cavalry Dragons, Megres and Deubel. With the deck, Gao challenges Ikazuchi again.
27 (91)	"Suzuha Blushes! A Love Letter from Tiger!!"; Transliteration: "Suzuha sekimen! Taigā kara no Rabu Retā" (Japanese: 鈴羽赤面！タイガーからの果し状！！)	October 10, 2015
Jin Magatsu is called out by a boy named 'Tiger', and is then lost contact with. Meguri Mamakari informs Zanya about this and he reports to Count Dawn. He is then entrusted to go back-up Jin. Zanya goes to find Suzuha Amanosuzu for questioning, and she also gets a letter from Tiger. Suzuha thinks that it is a love letter from Tasuku and does not listen to Zanya's explanation. She goes to the fight's place immediately. The one that appears in front of Suzuha is the previously kidnapped Noboru Kodou.
28 (92)	"Legend of the Mist!"; Transliteration: "Kiri no Shinwa" (Japanese: 霧の神話)	October 17, 2015
The Buddy Police gain new eyewitness information about an Omni Lord at Chou Hotaka. Gao is sent there and he encounters his former classmate, Kiri. Gao and Kiri were happy about their reunion, but Drum was worried about why his Omni Lord Emblem had reacted strangely. Gao stays over at Kiri's boarding house for the night. At night, Gao wakes up and sees Kiri talking to his father. However after taking a closer look, Kiri was not talking to his father. Instead, he was talking to a shadow that was inside a mirror...
29 (93)	"Tetsuya Becomes Speechless! The Demon Lord's Betrayal!!"; Transliteration: "Tetsuya zekku! Uragiri no Maō!!" (Japanese: テツヤ絶句！裏切りの魔王！！)	October 24, 2015
In order to seal Yamigedo, Gao and the rest start special training. Hence, Asmodai can't train with them since he's still resting and goes to the TV Station with Tetsuya. Meanwhile, Gao and Stella meet a band of 3 monsters that came from Magic World and take them to the TV Station. The band's singer, Rucy says that they used to be friends with Asmodai. Rucy says that Asmodai is a "Friend betraying Good-for-nothing." And Tetsuya is shocked beyond words.
30 (94)	"Tetsuya Cries Out! The Demon Lord Vanishes into the Void!! / Tetsuya Cries! The Demon Lord Vanishes to the Alternate Dimension!!"; Transliteration: "Tetsuya gōkyū! Maō ijigen ni kiyu!!" (Japanese: テツヤ号泣！魔王異次元に消ゆ！！)	October 31, 2015
Having had his half-body eaten by Yamigedo, Asmodai tracks Sophia and discovers the location of Yamigedo. Elsewhere, Tetsuya trusts and waits for Asmodai, who disappeared from before him. Rucy is impressed by Tetsuya's devotion, and opens up to him at the park. But then, they discover Asmodai trying to use Space Magic to reach Yamigedo. Without care for their own danger, the two leap into the magic circle. They arrive in an alternate dimension, and are attacked by the controlled half-body of Asmodai.
31 (95)	"Miseria's First Battle! Friendship Through the Ages!!"; Transliteration: "Miseria Raishin! Yūjyō wa Toki o Koete!!" (Japanese: ミセリア初陣！友情は時をこえて！！)	November 7, 2015
32 (96)	"Drum Kidnapped! Gao VS Shigamine!!"; Transliteration: "Sarawareta Doramu! Gao VS Shigamine!!" (Japanese: さらわれたドラム！牙王VS死ヶ峰！！)	November 14, 2015
Drum gets kidnapped by Shigamine and ask to give him the omni lord emblem so he would be an omni lord but suddenly Gao appears there to save drum and they buddy fight.
33 (97)	"Rescue Jack! Towards Tasuku's Despair-Filled Future!!"; Transliteration: "Jack o Sukue! Tasuku, Zetsubō no Mirai he" (Japanese: ジャックを救え！タスク、絶望の未来へ！！)	November 21, 2015
Takosuke and Paruko tell Tasuku about the transmission from Jack. Gao then asks Paruko if there is anyway to go to the future and she says that there is but the mothership of Takosuke needs the power that a city produces in a whole month to go to the far distant future. Sofia texts Tasuku and asks him to come to the Aibo Academy fighting stage and she gives him an option to which he agrees in order to save jack. The future is just a destroyed land and Tasuku remembers the Disaster. He then fells off a building when he gets hit by a monster and then he remembers Jack and the Disaster when he met Jack. He sees a brother and sister and helps them but just as he was about to get devoured by a monster. Jack saves him but Jack was blind. Suzaku Kenran comes and says there was no Star Dragon World and Jack didn't receive any aid. Jack falls to the ground and Tasuku cries.
34 (98)	"The Star of Hope! Light Star Guardian, Jackknife "Aster"!!"; Transliteration: "Kibō no Hoshi! Chō hikari hoshi mamoru Jakkunaifu "Asutēru"!!" (Japanese: 希望の星！超光星護ジャックナイフ "アステール"！！)	November 28, 2015
The chaotic future that Tasuku landed on was a future where Yamigedo wasn't sealed. Variable Cord explained to Tasuku that Jack didn't get his maintenance because Star Dragon World didn't exist. Tasuku is overwhelmed by anger and lets it out on Variable Cord. Meanwhile, the Hundred Demons kidnap Sofia and she is put at Gratos' hideout. After being informed about it, Tasuku heads out to save Sofia.
35 (99)	"Rouga vs Eighth Omni Deity Lord, Grangadez!"; Transliteration: "Rouga vs Hakakujin Gurangadesu!" (Japanese: ロウガvs八角神王 グランガデス！)	December 5, 2015
By Gratos' orders, Sofia uses her Disaster Force and forcibly awakens Grangadez. Grangadez is angry because of being disturbed and starts a rampage. Kiri and Rouga try to stop it. Third Omni Water Lord, Miseria's power managed to return Grangadez to card form, but Grangadez's ignited appetite for battle begins to affect Kiri's body negatively through the card. Rouga challenges Grangadez to a Buddy fight to calm its belligerence.
36 (100)	"Ikazuchi's Return! Mikado Family Under Attack!!"; Transliteration: "Fukkatsu no Ikazuchi! Mikado Chi Shūgeki!!" (Japanese: 復活のイカヅチ！未門家襲撃！！)	December 12, 2015
Mikado Suzumi comes back to Japan. She finds Ikazuchi and brings him home. Ikazuchi rests for a while, while Gao becomes happy. He tries to befriend him. Ikazuchi even tries to escape the house by jumping down the window.
37 (101)	"Omni Lords Assemble! Seal Yamigedo!!"; Transliteration: "Kakuō Shūketsu! Yamigedō Fūin!!" (Japanese: 角王集結！ヤミゲドウ封印！！)	December 19, 2015
The resurrection of Yamigedo is close at hand, and all Omni Lords are found! It is time to seal Yamigedo, but there is just one big problem. Where is Yamigedo?!
38 (102)	"Final Battle! Specter of Darkness Wasteland, O-Yamigedo!!"; Transliteration: "Kessen! Yami Ara-mitama" (Japanese: 決戦！闇荒御魂 オオヤミゲドウ！！)	December 26, 2015
Gratos`s plan has succeeded! Yamigedo is revived along with the creation of the Inverse Omni Lords! Will Gao and the team be able to fight off their doppelgangers?
39 (103)	"Super Final Battle! Cho-Shibuya Destroyed!!"; Transliteration: "Chō kessen! Chō Shibuya Dai Hōkai!!" (Japanese: 超決戦！超渋谷大崩壊！！)	January 9, 2016
Yamigedo has landed on Earth! Gratos is gone but in his place is the mentally torn Ikazuchi who is now being controlled by Yamigedo himself! Gao must step up in order to save his new friend once and for all!!
40 (104)	"The Day The Earth Turned to Stone"; Transliteration: "Chikyū ga Ishi ni Naru ni" (Japanese: 地球が石になる日)	January 16, 2016
Yamigedo has retreated in order to enact his final evolution, so it is time for Gao and the Lords to strike! However, the Inverse Fiends will not let them get by so easily?! Can Gao finally get through to his lost friends?!
41 (105)	"The Collision, Crossnize! Jack VS The Inverse Omni Lords"; Transliteration: "Shōtotsusuru Kurosunaize! Jakku VS Urakakuō" (Japanese: 衝突する星合体！（クロスナイズ）ジャックVS裏角王！！)	January 23, 2016
Gao and the gang has been separated by Yamigedo and his Dark Core, so each one has to fight a different Inverse Fiend alone! Tasuku and Suzaku are the first targeted by Sofia, but something seems...Emotional about her?! What is Sofia`s endgame?!
42 (106)	"Tag Match? Zanya and Tetsuya versus Jin and Suzuha!"; Transliteration: "Taggu Macchi? Zanya ・ Tetsuya vs Jin ・ Suzuha!!" (Japanese: タッグマッチ？斬夜・テツヤvsジン・鈴羽！！)	January 30, 2016
Zanya and Tetsuya are stuck together as they face the next 2 Inverse Fiends, but Zanya`s serious attitude and Tetsuya`s free spirit are colliding! Will the two cooperate to save the common enemy?!
43 (107)	"Wh-Wh-What`s this? Gao versus Okada?"; Transliteration: "Nanananto! Gao vs Okada!?" (Japanese: なななんと！牙王vsオカダ！？)	February 6, 2016
Gao is still shaken up by his failure to save Ikazuchi, but he must snap out of it as he is next to face against the Inverse Fiends, but his opponent is not Ges Shido, it is World Famous Wrestler Kazuchika Okada?! Can Gao snap out of his hesitation in order to face a man who is as strong as a god?!
44 (108)	"Odd Couples! Kiri and Rouga vs Noboru and Davide!"; Transliteration: "Kusemono soroi! Kiri・Rouga VS Noboru・Dabide!!" (Japanese: 曲者揃い！キリ・ロウガVSノボル・ダビデ！！)	February 13, 2016
The next battle against the Inverse Fiends are with Kiri and Rouga, tagging up against the brainwashed Tiger and Davide Yamazaki. Can this "Odd Couple" take out these wild beasts of an adversary?!
45 (109)	"Fire Lord Showdown! Burn Nova vs Venom Nova!"; Transliteration: "En-Ō Taiketsu! Bān Nova VS Venomu Nova!!" (Japanese: 炎王対決!バーンノヴァVSヴェノムノヴァ!!)	February 20, 2016
The Next fight against the Inverse Fiends has arrived, as Ban finally heads into the ring against the powerful human, Genma Todoroki. Meanwhile, deep in the depths of the cave, Mukuro Shigamine appears, but not before being Intercepted by a certain person?!
46 (110)	"Captain Answer Overlord's Rebellion!"; Transliteration: "Kyapten Ansā "Ōbārōdo" no Hangyaku!!" (Japanese: キャプテン・アンサー"オーバーロード"の反逆!!)	February 27, 2016
In an act of desperation, Yamigedo has turned Kemura into a horrifying monster! Kazane loses to him, but before she is turned to stone, Captain Answer is taken by Yamigedo to become his servant. Mukuro Shigamine arrives to help Kazane fight the evil duo in a 2 on 2, with the remains of the Ninth Omni Lord Emblem close to his heart! Can Kazane get through to her close friend, and can Mukuro awaken the true spirit of a Hero inside him?!
47 (111)	"Where the Cards Went! Shido`s Death Symphony of Rage!"; Transliteration: "Kādo no yukue! Shidō ikari no desu shi nfonī!!" (Japanese: カードの行方！祠堂怒りのDEATH死ンフォニー！！)	March 5, 2016
All of the Inverse Fiends are defeated, but it seems that Kyoya Gaen has appeared from behind the scenes to enact his master plan! With the assault of two powerful beasts colliding, Shido is stuck between the crossfire of his two bosses! As Shido must confront a life threatening decision, which side will he choose?!
48 (112)	"The Biggest! The Baddest! The Strongest! Hundred-eyes Yamigedo!"; Transliteration: "Saidai saiaku saikyō! Hyakugan' Yamigedou!!" (Japanese: 最大最悪最強！ヒャクガンヤミゲドウ！！)	March 12, 2016
Yamigedo has reached the ultimate of ultimate forms due to Kyoya's master plan going horribly wrong. And it seems everyone but Tasuku has been turned to stone! Tasuku must fight alone as he faces the true form of the Lord of Hundred Thunders and his Demons! Can he survive and bring out a miracle?!
49 (113)	"Save the World! A Hundred Despairs"; Transliteration: "Sekai o sukue! Zetsubō no handoreddo!!" (Japanese: 世界を救え！絶望のハンドレッド！！)	March 19, 2016
The Ultimate form of Great Fiend, Yamigedo has been forged and summoned to the apocalyptic future! Ikazuchi stands with all the true Omni lords in a fight for his world, his family, and his identity?! As the beast rampages the fight with his indestructible power, can Ikazuchi awaken the powers of the Ultimate Power to turn Yamigedo into nothingness?!
50 (114)	"Beyond the Limit! Unparalleled Arts, Omni Lord ∞ Burst!"; Transliteration: "Genkai no sonosakihe! Musō ōgi-kaku-ō ∞-dan!!" (Japanese: 限界のその先へ！無双奥義 角王∞弾!!)	March 26, 2016
Gao`s battle against Yamigedo has become almost one-sided, due to the power of Yamigedo's 100-card deck, but Gao does not give up in the face of despair. With all 9 Omni Lords in his deck, The ultimate Power forged, and the lives of everyone in the Past, Present, and Future on the line, can Gao truly go Beyond the Limit?!

== Future Card Buddyfight Triple D ==
The entirety of this season did not get a dub translation, it was also confirmed at the time before it aired that there were no plans to have it dubbed.

Opening theme

- Chronograph by Natsuhiro Takaaki (eps. 1-27)
- DDD by Shouta Aoi (eps. 28–51)

Ending theme

- Wakey☆Thump SHOOTER by Sora Tokui (eps. 1-27)
- Yume no Hikari-kun no Mirai by Aina Aiba (eps. 28–39)
- Unite (Live Forever) by Bars and Melody (eps. 40–51)

No.	Title	Original release date
1 (115)	"Uh-oh! An Impact Monster is Born!"; Transliteration: "Yabee! Hissatsu Monster Tanjou!" (Japanese: ヤベェ! 必殺モンスター誕生!!)	April 2, 2016
In the time since Yamigedo with Buddyfighting and School, without Drum, life seems to have settled for Gao, until a Buddy rare card he suddenly pulled becomes an Egg! This egg and the being inside "Bal" is being hunted down by Kyoya Gaen and his buddy! With the fate of a newborn baby in his hands, Gao rejoins the ring as Bal`s Buddy!
2 (116)	"Amazing! A Sure-fire Way to Win Buddyfight!"; Transliteration: "Sugee! Zettai Kateru Buddyfight Hisshouhou!!" (Japanese: スゲェ! 絶対勝てるバディファイト必勝法!!)	April 9, 2016
Bal`s vast need to buddyfight grows with each passing minute, however he does not know the rules and any help given is denied by him since he wants to win! Running away in anger, he comes across a certain Monster
3 (117)	"Scary! Gaito`s Impact Monster!"; Transliteration: "Kowaa! Gaito no Hissatsu Monster!!" (Japanese: コワァ! ガイトの必殺モンスター!!)	April 16, 2016
A mysterious fighter named Gaito Kurouzu has been attack fighters, hunting for their powerful cards. During an argument between Bal and Gao, this mysterious hunter challenges Gao for his Impact Monster?! Can Gao defeat the onslaught of the New Black Dragons?!
4 (118)	"Cool! Jack`s Impact Monster!"; Transliteration: "Kakkee! Jack no Hissatsu Monster!!" (Japanese: カッケェ! ジャックの必殺モンスター!!)	April 23, 2016
A mysterious new student in Aibo Academy is picking on Bal and making everyone not like him! Only Jack trusts Bal`s words and together must hunt down this mysterious culprit to the crime!
5 (119)	"So Mean! Demon Coach Asmodai!"; Transliteration: "Hidee! Akuma no Coach Asmodai!!" (Japanese: ヒデェ! 悪魔のコーチ・アスモダイ!!)	April 30, 2016
Gao and Bal want to be stronger in order to compete for the World Buddy Champion! To do this, they ask to train under old allies Zanya Kisaragi and battle with Tetsuya Kurodake. However, Bal asks Asmodai to coach him in order to be strong! Meanwhile, Kyoya begins his plans to hunt for the "Ultimate Dragon".
6 (120)	"Impressive! Abygale versus Azi Dahaka!"; Transliteration: "Panee! Abigail VS Azi Dahaka!!" (Japanese: パネェ! アビゲールVSアジ・ダハーカ!!)	May 7, 2016
Kyoya has contacted Gaito for a Buddyfight due to a request from Azi Dahaka himself! What is this secret connection between Abygale and Azi Dahaka, and what has Gaito been dragged down into?!
7 (121)	"It's Here! WBC Cup Cho-Tokyo Championship!"; Transliteration: "Kitaa! WBC Cup Chou Tokyo Taikai!!" (Japanese: キタァー! WBCカップ超東驚大会!!)	May 14, 2016
The start of the WBC Preliminaries have begun, as everyone in Aibo Academy readies to fight! Who will be forced to clash against one another and who will stand in the Winners Circle?!
8 (122)	"So Lovely! Uniform Warrior of Love and Courage, Blazer Frill!"; Transliteration: "Moemoee! Ai to Seigi no Seifuku Senshi Blazerfrill!!" (Japanese: モエモエーッ! 愛と正義の制服戦士ブレザーフリル!!)	May 21, 2016
For the first round of the Quarter Finals, Tasuku Ryuenji faces off against the mysterious Masuka Raid, however Bal and Gao hear from his buddy that if she loses, she will be horribly punished! Will Tasuku cast aside his conscience for the win, or is this mysterious Heroine trying to take center stage?! First Battle! Jackknife Neodragons VS Superhero/Heroine!!
9 (123)	"What? The Stolen Impact Monster!"; Transliteration: "Nanii! Ubawareta Hissatsu Monster!!" (Japanese: ナニィ！奪われた必殺モンスター!!)	May 28, 2016
Second Match of the quarterfinals begin, pitting Gaito Kurouzu and Wataru Kageo. In order to make sure his victory, he steals Gaitos Vanishing Death Hole, before the fight. Can Gaito survive without his most powerful card against the onslaught of the Shadow Shades?! Match 2! Black Dragons VS Shadow Shades!
10 (124)	"Yikes! An Unexpected Fishy Disaster!"; Transliteration: "Gyogyo! Sonna Masaka na dai Pinch!!" (Japanese: ギョギョ! そんなマサカな大ピンチ!!)	June 4, 2016
The Third Match of the WBC Cho Tokyo Qualifiers has begun, as Gao must face off against Dash Kazakiri and his Ride Changers, however Gao is cursed and is slowly becoming a fish! How will Gao break the curse and will his fishiness ruin his chances at Best 4?!
11 (125)	"So Huge! Chiefs' Showdown!"; Transliteration: "Dekee! Banchou dai Kettou!!" (Japanese: デケェ! 番長大決闘!!)	June 11, 2016
The Final Match of the Quarter Finals has begun! Dai Kaido faces off against Genma Todoroki! As Genma charges in with his powerful Sieger, Dai uses a deck unknown to everyone! Meanwhile Gao has shenanigans about that seaweed.
12 (126)	"It's Not Working! Bal Burst Smasher?"; Transliteration: "Dameda! Bal Burst Smasher!?" (Japanese: ダメダァ！バルバースト・スマッシャー!?)	June 18, 2016
Gao and Gaito face off once again in the Semi-Finals of the Cup, They seem neck and neck until Gao unleashes Bal Burst only for it to fail! How will Gao win now without using an Impact Monster?!
13 (127)	"It's Here! Duel Jaeger Revolted!"; Transliteration: "Deta! Muteki Ryū Riboruteddo!!" (Japanese: デタァ！無敵竜"リボルテッド"!!)	June 25, 2016
Tasuku and Dai Kaido face off in the second battle of the Semi-Finals! While Tasuku puts his all into this fight, Dai Kaido responds to his drive with his own power. Being pushed to the breaking point by Tasuku's power, Dai unleashes his ultimate power! Can Tasuku be able to stop the revolution of Duel Jaeger?!
14 (128)	"Hooray! Cho-Tokyo Championship Final Festival!"; Transliteration: "Wasshoi! Chō Higashi Odoroki Taikai Kesshō Matsuri!!" (Japanese: ワッショイ！超東驚大会決勝祭り!!)	July 2, 2016
Gao is told by Baku that he cannot defeat Dai Kaido with the power he has now, seeing how Revolted can stop any effect damage. In order to prep him, Gao goes under the wing of Genma to train both him and Bal to face off against Duel Jaeger, but will this training pay off?!
15 (129)	"Pow! Great Full Bal Lariat!"; Transliteration: "Oryaa! Gureito Furu Baru Rariatto!!" (Japanese: オリャア！グレイトフル・バルラリアット!!)	July 9, 2016
Dai Kaido has brought out Duel Jaeger Revolted as soon as the second turn!!! As Gao struggles between the awesome power of Duel Jaeger, Gao and Bal must bring out the ultimate power that they acquired through training! Will this training pay off as the Sun Burns the Ocean?!
16 (130)	"Shock! Zanya's Retirement Declaration!"; Transliteration: "Shokku! Ki Yoru Intai Sengen!!" (Japanese: ショック！斬夜引退宣言!!)	July 16, 2016
As a normal day of school progresses, Gao and the gang notice something strange going on with Zanya. He is actually talking to girls and dating one! Its gotten to a point that he wants to marry this girl and retire from Buddyfighting?! Is Zanya growing up, or is there another force at play?!
17 (131)	"Full Steam Ahead! To the Japan Representative Invitational Island!"; Transliteration: "Yōsoro! Nihon Daihyō Senbatsu no Shima e!!" (Japanese: ヨーソロォ！日本代表選抜の島へ!!)	July 23, 2016
One Month has passed, and the day of the WBC Cup's Japan Tournament has finally arrived. Cetacea Barding Academy has kindly offered transport on their cruise ship for Gao, Tasuku, and Dai, and their friends, to the tournament's venue, Cho-Taiyo Island; While Gaito is the only one boarding a helicopter flight. Gao relays what has happened so far to Tasuku and Dai; his first encounter with Bal; Tasuku's first use of an impact monster; and Gaito's epic clash with Kyoya. After Paruko and Ozon-B provide a recap of the Cho Tokyo championship, the ship is about to make landfall on Cho-Taiyo. Meanwhile, A sinister character called Doctor Gara has infiltrated the island. Gara is recognized by Kyoya as a scientist dabbling in illegal acts of artificial monster creation. Gara also successfully threatens to blackmail Kyoya, if he doesn't allow Gara to use Cho-Taiyo's lab. Both Kyoya and Gara are in search of the Dragon Force. Meanwhile, Gaito soon arrives on Cho-Taiyo, and is also in search of the Dragon Force, hoping that it will help him from being defeated by Gao or anyone else ever again!
18 (132)	"Here it Comes! WBC Cup Japan Tournament!"; Transliteration: "Kitakita! WBC Kappu Nihon Taikai!!" (Japanese: キタキタァー！WBCカップ日本大会!!)	July 30, 2016
The Preliminary Qualifiers of the WBC Cup Japan Tournament is underway! In order to qualify for the next round, Gao and the gang must win 100 matches! However, to make the tournament fair, All Impact Monsters are Blocked from play! Will Gao finally have to use his innermost skills to win for once?!
19 (133)	"Here it Comes Again! Terrifying Natural Enemy, Zodiac!"; Transliteration: "Matadeta! Kyōfu no Tenteki Zodiakku!!" (Japanese: マタデタァ！恐怖の天敵ゾディアック!!)	August 6, 2016
Gao must secure 94 more victories to take place in the Japan Cup, however Gara is on his Trail. Wanting to feed Bals' hidden power to Zodiac, Gao and Bal are thrust into a battle with the evil Doctor Gara! Will Gao be able to handle the weight of the powerful new Dual Monster, Zodiac?!
20 (134)	"Danger! The Wolf Makes Its Move!"; Transliteration: "Denjā! Ugokidashita Ōkami!!" (Japanese: デンジャー！動き出した狼!!)	August 13, 2016
Gao`s attempts of trying to get 100 wins keeps getting foiled by Gara`s attempts to kidnap Bal, however Rouga intervenes in his next attempt! As the two calm down after a thrilling battle, Rouga challenges Gao to a buddyfight!
21 (135)	"Grandmother! Enter Tenka Gotsurugi!"; Transliteration: "Obaba! Goken Tenka Sanjō!!" (Japanese: オババッ！五剣天下参上!!)	August 20, 2016
Gao must acquire 88 more wins to get himself back on track to the finals, but one swordsman will get in his way! In the meantime, Abygale and Gaito find a suspicious old lady while fighting through the tournament.
22 (136)	"Yikes! 5 Seconds to Detonation!"; Transliteration: "Uwa! Bakuhatsu 0-Byō Mae!!" (Japanese: ウワッ！爆発0秒前!!)	August 27, 2016
Bal has been kidnapped by Doctor Gara?! Gao, Rouga and the gang must find Gara and Bal before Gara can discover Bals own mysterious powers! And what does this mystery have to do with the luxurious Cho-Taiyou Hotel!?
23 (137)	"Bal! Fire, Galactical Punisher!"; Transliteration: "Baru! Hanate, Gyarakutikaru Panisshā!!" (Japanese: バルゥ！放て、ギャラクティカル・パニッシャー!!)	September 3, 2016
As Gao and gang hunt for Doctor Gara, who has Bal hostage, Tasuku is 1 match away from making it to the finals. His opponent, the mysterious Ageha Gokuraku. She uses an unknown deck known as the Divine Guardians! As her deck becomes too tough for Tasuku, can Tasuku master the all powerful "Galactical Punisher!"?!
24 (138)	"Hot! Searing Executioners of Destiny!"; Transliteration: "Achi! Shukumei no Shakunetsu Jigoku!!" (Japanese: アチィッ！宿命の灼熱地獄!!)	September 10, 2016
Day 5 of the Japan tournament begins, and Gaito wins his 99th battle, leaving him with only one more win to qualify for the World championship. But, he is still obsessed over how the Dragon force chose Tasuku first and not him. Tasuku informs Gao that the Buddy police have the Gara situation under control, so Gao could focus his attention on getting more wins. Meanwhile, Bal is in Gara's new lab again hiding in his eggshell as Gara tries to lure him out with pizza. Gaito and Abygale wander around Cho-taiyo until they get a glimpse of a white dove. They are then found by Shura Gokumon and his buddy, Helle Gepard. Shura claims that Gaito had met him before, though the latter seems to have no memory of him. Gaito battles against Shura, who like Ageha, uses a special deck specializing on a special flag card, Searing Executioners. Shura's deck got Gaito on the ropes, but Gaito eventually counters with a deck out strategy which wins him the battle, and brings his total of wins to 100. The real reason Shura wanted revenge on Gaito was because his former girlfriend saw him lose to Gaito, and then rejected Shura to be Gaito's fan. Then, Gaito is engulfed in light which Sayuri recognizes as a sign of the Dragon Force. Then the dove from earlier appears before Gaito and manifests into a white version of Gaito and then disappears. Sayuri then states that because Gaito chose to conceal his fears and weaknesses within himself, It would be impossible for the Dragon Force to accept him. Excited over getting his first glimpse of the dragon force, Gaito has Abygale use unlimited death drain on Shura and his buddy causing them to vanish. White Gaito briefly reappears and asks Gaito when will he open his heart, leaving Gaito confused.
25 (139)	"Wow! Bal Saucer Over Rush!"; Transliteration: "Sugge! Baru Sōsā Ōbā Rasshu!!" (Japanese: スッゲェ！バルソーサー・オーバーラッシュ!!)	September 17, 2016
Gao and Tasuku have tracked Bal's location! In the remote forest, Gara has found a final base to try and discover Bal's secret. With no time left, Gao rushes in to find Bal, but why is Kakeru nearby?!
26 (140)	"Go, Go! Bal`s Surging Steady Advance!"; Transliteration: "Gōgō! Baru, Dotō no Kaishingeki!!" (Japanese: ゴーゴー！バル、怒涛の快進撃!!)	September 24, 2016
Bal and Gao trying to get to 100 wins.
27 (141)	"Gao! This is the Dragon Force!"; Transliteration: "Gao! Kore ga Doragon Fōsuda!!" (Japanese: ガオオォ！これがドラゴンフォースだ!!)	October 1, 2016
Gao and Bal are forced into a battle with Gara, who reveals himself to be Kakeru! He has drugged Bal into becoming a monster that will destroy everyone once the fight ends! As Bal tries to control himself, and Gao trying everything he can to defeat Gara, a new power awakens!!
28 (142)	"Here it comes! Here it comes! Here it comes! WBC Cup World Championships!"; Transliteration: "Kita Kita Kita! WBC Kappu Sekai Taikai!!" (Japanese: キタキタキタァー！WBCカップ世界大会!!)	October 8, 2016
Gao is preparing to journey the WBC Cup World Championship! Being held in the vast country of America! Meanwhile, Kyoya fights against an Egyptian Buddyfighter.
29 (143)	"Scary Trap! Jackknife, Arrested!"; Transliteration: "Wanawana! Taiho sa Reta Jakkunaifu!!" (Japanese: ワナワナ！逮捕されたジャックナイフ!!)	October 15, 2016
As the first round for the B Division of the WBC Cup World Championships is about to go underway, Jack is arrested for attacking someone! Bal and Gao must find the proof or else Tasuku will be disqualified from the tournament and Jack sent back to Dragon World forever!
30 (144)	"Wedding! Man Mountain Range, Devil Destroy!"; Transliteration: "Wedingu! Ningen Sanmyaku Debiru Desutoroi!!" (Japanese: ウェディング！人間山脈デビル・デストロイ!!)	October 22, 2016
Gaito is enraged that both Gao, and now Tasuku both have the Dragon Force whilst he still hasn't, and trashes his hotel room as a result. Meanwhile, Gao and friends are met by Devil Destroy Bigmachine, one of the American representatives, and his buddy, Gigadroid Biggest. Angered by Bigmachine gloating about how popular and muscular he is, Gao and Bal decide to bulk up for their upcoming match against him. Then, they head to the Asmodai gym where they run into Tetsuya and Asmoadai, who have just recently won their Dance tournament, which was coincidentally also held in L.A.. Tets and A-Dawg give Gao, Bal, Baku, and Noboru bodybuilding DVDs and the four of them work out. Gao, Bal, and Baku come out all buff, while Noboru's DVD had...different results, especially since the target audience was female. The next day, Gao's match with Bigmachine begins. Asmodai's exercises had worn off for Gao, Bal, and Baku; But Noboru was still in his/her current state. Bigmachine shows up to gloat in front of Gao before the battle, and then, unable to recognize Noboru's current state, mistakes him/her as a girl and falls in love with him/her. Gao then battles Bigmachine with Noboru's hand in marriage on the line. Gao is driven to a corner by Bigmachine's Gigadroid Hero world deck; but manages to survive his impact card, bigmachine Sledgehammer. it's at this point that Noboru has reverted to his correct gender, and Bigmachine is confused about where his "Baby" went. With his opponent flustered, Gao equips his Dragon Force, then impact calls Bal Saucer Overush and wins the match. Afterwards, as a side effect of the DVD, Gao and the guys feel pains in their right arms
31 (145)	"Zeta! Shocking Mobile Berserkers!"; Transliteration: "Zēta! Kyōgaku no Kikō Senki!!" (Japanese: ゼータ！驚愕の機甲戦鬼!!)	October 29, 2016
Genesis and Gaito face off in the Semi Finals! Genesis amazes everyone through the power of his deck being able to call nothing but Impact Monsters, but Gaito stays determined to try and awaken the Dragon Force! Will Gaito awaken the Dragon Force through sheer will, or will this Mobile Berserker reign supreme?!
32 (146)	"Meow Meow Meow! Meow meow, meow meow!" Transliteration: "Nya Nya Nya! Nya Nya Nya Nya!!" (Japanese: ニャニャニャ！にゃにゃにゃにゃ!!)	November 5, 2016
Gao's second round match is open us and he faces... Ozon-B?! The little rascal finally has a buddy and he made it to the world championships legally! Will Gao be able to defeat someone who can literally never go away?!
33 (147)	"For Real? Fake Replica Weapon, Gemclone!"; Transliteration: "Maji!? Fukusei Mohō Heiki Jemukurōn!!" (Japanese: マジッ!?複製模倣兵器 ジェムクローン!!)	November 12, 2016
Tasuku`s second round match has begun, facing off against J Genesis! Meanwhile in Cho-Tokyo, the Buddy Police start to interrogate Gara as he spills some interesting secrets about Kyoya and J Genesis!
34 (148)	"Revenge! The Tiger Roars Twice!"; Transliteration: "Ribenji! Tora wa ni-do Hoeru!!" (Japanese: リベンジィ！虎は二度吠える!!)	November 19, 2016
The final match of A Block has begun, with Noboru facing off against Kyoya Gaen! As the odds are stacked against him, Noboru will fight to win against the Demonic End and his Master! Can Noboru win with his new deck and drive to fight?!
35 (149)	"Last Fight! Farewell, Abygale!"; Transliteration: "Rasuto Faito! Saraba Abigēru!!" (Japanese: ラストファイト！さらばアビゲール!!)	November 26, 2016
Days before the final match of Gao vs Genesis, Gao and the gang learn that Abygale has disappeared! Gao and the gang go to find Abygale, as Abygale himself searches for his identity.
36 (150)	"Serious Trouble! Impact Origin Breaker!"; Transliteration: "Gachiyaba! Hissatsu no Orijin Bureikā!!" (Japanese: ガチヤバ！必殺のオリジン・ブレイカー!!)	December 3, 2016
The day before the semi-final match between Gao and J Genesis, Gemclone's new form, Origin Breaker is unveiled to the public! Gao and his friends are intimidated. Will they be able to overcome this overwhelming adversity?
37 (151)	"Ultra-Amazing! Super Sun Dragon, Balle Soleil!"; Transliteration: "Gachisugo! Chō Taiyō Ryū Baru Soreiyu!!" (Japanese: ガチスゴ！超太陽竜 バルソレイユ!!)	December 10, 2016
The semi-final match between Gao and J Genesis are underway, and it's up to Gao and Bal to stop Genesis' schemes! When all hope seems to be lost when Gemclone, "Origin Breaker!" enters the field, a mysterious light from the Dragon Forces resonates with Bal...
38 (152)	"Pops! Azi Dahaka's End!"; Transliteration: "Oyaji! Aji Dahāka no Saigo!!" (Japanese: オヤジッ！アジ・ダハーカの最期!!)	December 17, 2016
Gao and his friends go after Bal, and discover his history with Azi Dahaka. Meanwhile, Kyoya challenges Gaito and Abygale.
39 (153)	"Endless! Black Sky Sun Dragon, Azi Dahaka Daeva!"; Transliteration: "Endoresu! Kokuten Taiyō Ryū Aji Dahāka Daēwa!!" (Japanese: エンドレス！黒天太陽竜 アジ・ダハーカ "ダ・エーワ"!!)	December 24, 2016
Dai Kaido has traveled to help Gao train for his final battle against Azi, and help Bal control his true form, however in the night, Dai stumbles upon Azi and Kyoya as they begin to fight. How will Dai beat the Ultimate Form of Azi Dahaka?!
40 (154)	"Final! WBC Cup World Championships Final Match!"; Transliteration: "Fainaru! WBC Kappu Sekai Taikai Kesshō!!" (Japanese: ファイナル！WBCカップ世界大会決勝!!)	January 8, 2017
Gao and Kyoya begin their battle for the title of World Champion! As Bal and Azi Dahaka clash, the battle becomes more intense each second! Which of these suns will shine victorious?!
41 (155)	"Super Sun Dragon vs. Black Sky Sun Dragon"; Transliteration: "Dohyā! Chō Taiyō Ryū VS Kokuten Taiyō Ryū!!" (Japanese: ドヒャーッ！超太陽竜VS黒天太陽竜!!)	January 14, 2017
Bal and Azi keep their fight going, neither side letting down as light fights the darkness again, as the monsters clash, the fighters share their own bout as Kyoya still prepares his trump card!
42 (156)	"Seriously?! Mind-Blowing 20,000 Defense?!"; Transliteration: "Majika! Bōgyo-Ryoku 20000 no Kyōi!!" (Japanese: マジカッ！防御力20000の驚異!!)	January 21, 2017
Everyone returns to Japan as Gao starts training to defeat the mysterious Dragon Drei! As he goes to school one day, he is visited by long time friend Kiri Hyoryu! Once they finish their talk, they fight to see how each other has grown!
43 (157)	"Colliding Forces! Tasuku vs. Gaito?!"; Transliteration: "Gekitotsu! Ryū-en Tera Tasuku VS Kurouzu Gaito!?" (Japanese: ゲキトツ！龍炎寺タスクVS黒渦ガイト!?)	January 28, 2017
44 (158)	"Revenge! Doctor Gara Strikes Back!"; Transliteration: "Ribenji! Dokutā Gara no Fukushū!!" (Japanese: リベンジィ！ドクター・ガラの復讐!!)	February 4, 2017
45 (159)	"Seriously Hot! Gemclone's Heart!"; Transliteration: "Majiachi! Jemukurōn no Kokoro!!" (Japanese: マジアチィッ！ジェムクローンの心!!)	February 11, 2017
Gaito and Abygale make it to the front door of the Gaen Tower, only to be intercepted by J Genesis. He was released from prison by Kyoya, but something else seems off. Abygale and Gaito try to connect to Genesis and Gemclones heart during the fight!!
46 (160)	"Good Luck! Wolf's Final Fight!"; Transliteration: "Guddo Rakku! Urufu Saigo no Faito!!" (Japanese: グッドラック！ウルフ最期のファイト!!)	February 18, 2017
Rouga, disguised as Wolf, suddenly appears at Gao's house and challenges him to a Buddyfight. Their ideals clash as he reveals to Gao the nature of Kyoya's plans.
47 (161)	"Massive Shock! Dragon Drei's Amazing Power!"; Transliteration: "Gachi Shokku! Doragon Dorai Kyōi no Chikara!!" (Japanese: ガチショック！ドラゴン・ドライ驚異の力!!)	February 25, 2017
While seeking to stop the creation of Dragon Drei, Tasuku and Gaito find Kyoya waiting for them at a fighting stage. He challenges both of them to a fight, and seemingly gets overpowered by the combined forces of the two. However, he unleashes the power of Dragon Drei, and turns the tables on them.
48 (162)	"Secret! The True Nature of Project Triple D!"; Transliteration: "Shīkuretto! Purojekuto DDD no Zenbō!!" (Japanese: シークレット！プロジェクトDDDの全貌!!)	March 4, 2017
After being defeated by Kyoya, Tasuku and Gaito help Gao train for his upcoming fight against Kyoya, while Baku does his best to build Gao a deck that will counter Dragon Drei.
49 (163)	"Fight! Buddy Champion Deciding Round!"; Transliteration: "Faitsu! Badi Chanpion Kettei-sen!!" (Japanese: ファイッ！バディチャンピオン決定戦!!)	March 11, 2017
After two months of intense training, Gao and Bal, go back to the World Buddy Stadium for their rematch against Kyoya. They fight hard, and even destroy Azi Dahaka "Daeva" easily, but in doing so, they enable Kyoya to get his hands on Dragon Drei and the ability to unleash a new power.
50 (164)	"Climax! Unleash the Eternal Bal Blaster!"; Transliteration: "Kuraimakkusu! Hanate, Etānaru Baru Burasutā!!" (Japanese: クライマックス！放て、エターナル・バルブラスター!!)	March 18, 2017
Kyoya transforms into Demonic Dragon Deity of the Black Sun, Gaen! With its overwhelming might, Kyoya decimates Gao, and even prevents him from drawing any cards, seemingly leaving Gao unable to do anything, but then, Gao activates a special card...
51 (165)	"Bye-bye! Eternal Farewell to Bal!"; Transliteration: "Baibai! Baru, Eien no Wakare!!" (Japanese: バイバイ！バル、永遠の別れ!!)	March 25, 2017
After learning that Bal will soon disappear, Gao makes the most of their time together. During the celebration of their victory in the World Buddy Cup, they take on several fighters, and at the end of it all, a strange crest appears on Bal's forehead...

== Future Card Buddyfight X ==
After the lengthy hiatus from season 2 episode 26 to the season 3 finale; the English dub finally returns from the start of this season.

Opening theme

- Brave Soul Fight! by Sora Tokui and Shūta Morishima (eps. 1-29)
- Buddyfighter x Buddyfighter by Jun Shirota (eps. 30–52)

Ending theme

- Mukai Kaze ni Fight! (Fight Against the Wind") by Ayana Kinoshita (eps. 1-29)
- B.O.F by Poppin'Party (eps. 30–52)

No.	Title	Original release date
1 (166)	"The Most Powerful Demon Lord Dragon! His Name is Batzz!"; Transliteration: "Saikyō no Maō Ryū! Sono na ha Battsu!!" (Japanese: 最強の魔王竜！その名はバッツ!!)	April 1, 2017
As Gao spends his days, he is invited by an unknown monster to represent Dragon World in a special tourney! But without a buddy, Gao cannot do much, so they travel to Dragon World! As Gao reaches a peculiar temple, he is attacked by an unknown enemy!!! As a voice calls out to him, will Gao respond to the Demon Lord Dragon?! The Destroyer of Dragon World?!
2 (167)	"Batzz goes to Earth! Major Panic in Cho-Tokyo!"; Transliteration: "Battsu Chikū e! Chō-Tōkyō Dai Panikku!!" (Japanese: バッツ地球へ！超東驚大パニック!!)	April 8, 2017
3 (168)	"No-Damage Fighter! Ozora Kanata!"; Transliteration: "Nō-Damēji Faitā! Ozora Kanata!!" (Japanese: ノーダメージファイター！大宇宙カナタ！！)	April 15, 2017
4 (169)	"The World Buddy Masters Begins!"; Transliteration: "Wārudo Badi Masutāzu Kaimaku!!" (Japanese: ワールドバディマスターズ開幕!!)	April 22, 2017
5 (170)	"Become a Tiger! Noboru's Final Fight!"; Transliteration: "Tora ni nare! Noboru, Saigo no Faito!!" (Japanese: トラになれ！ノボル、最後のファイト!!)	April 29, 2017
6 (171)	"Strongest Battleship Satsuki Launches! Attack Target: Batzz!"; Transliteration: "Saikyō Senkan Satsuki Hasshin! Kōgeki Mokuhyō ha Battsu!!" (Japanese: 最強戦艦サツキ発進！攻撃目標はバッツ!!)	May 6, 2017
7 (172)	"Gaito is...? Kaido is...? The Death Sentence Approaches!"; Transliteration: "Gaito Ka!? Kaidō Ka!? Semaru Shinosenkoku!!" (Japanese: ガイトか！？海道か！？迫る死の宣告！！)	May 13, 2017
8 (173)	"Terrifying Ambush! Batzz's Back the Wall"; Transliteration: "Kyōfu no Kishū! Battsu Zettai Zetsumei!!" (Japanese: 恐怖の奇襲！バッツ絶体絶命！！)	May 20, 2017
9 (174)	"Gaito versus Kanata! Impact Shoot of Destiny!"; Transliteration: "Gaito VS Kanata! Unmei no Hissatsu Shūto!!" (Japanese: ガイトVSカナタ！運命の必殺シュート！！)	May 27, 2017
10 (175)	"Final Round! Who is the World Number One?"; Transliteration: "Kesshōsen! Wārudo Nanbā 1 wa Dareda!" (Japanese: 決勝戦！ワールドナンバー1は誰だ！！)	June 3, 2017
11 (176)	"The Desperate Battle Concludes! The Mirage Card Manifests!"; Transliteration: "Shitō Ketchaku! Mirāju Kādo Kōrin!!" (Japanese: 死闘決着！ミラージュカード降臨！！)	June 10, 2017
12 (177)	"Ruler of Chaos! Geargod VII!"; Transliteration: "C no Shihai-sha! Giagoddo VII!!" (Japanese: Cの支配者！ギアゴッドVII！！)	June 17, 2017
13 (178)	"Wisdom's Terrifying Conspiracy! Rage, Batzz!!"; Transliteration: "Wizudamu no Osorubeki Inbō! Okore Battsu!!" (Japanese: ウィズダムの恐るべき陰謀！怒れバッツ！！)	June 24, 2017
14 (179)	"After the Raging Battle... Gao Perishes!"; Transliteration: "Gekitō no hate ni... Gaō shisu!!" (Japanese: 激闘の果てに... 牙王死す！！)	July 1, 2017
15 (180)	"Terror from the Toilet! Aibo Academy is Full of Ghosts!"; Transliteration: "Toire no Kyōfu! Aibō Gakuen wa Obake-Darake!?" (Japanese: トイレの恐怖！相棒学園はオバケだらけ！？)	July 8, 2017
16 (181)	"Gao in Tasuku! A Two-in-One X Tempest Buster!!"; Transliteration: "Gaō in (in) Tasuku! Futari de Hitori no X Ten Basutā!!" (Japanese: 牙王 in（イン）タスク！ 二人で一人の×天バスター！！)	July 15, 2017
17 (182)	"Time Limit! The Day That Gao Stops Existing!"; Transliteration: "Taimu Rimitto! Gaō ga Shōmetsu Suru hi!!" (Japanese: タイムリミット！牙王が消滅する日！！)	July 22, 2017
18 (183)	"Nirvana? Gehenna? Guru Bubbuku and Giant Tanuki!"; Transliteration: "Tengoku? Jigoku? Bunbuku Shishō to Deka Tanuki!!" (Japanese: 天国？地獄？ぶんぶく師匠とデカたぬき！！)	July 29, 2017
19 (184)	"Training Camp Begins! The X Tempest Buster Revives!"; Transliteration: "Gasshuku Sutāto! Fukkatsu no X Ten Basutā!!" (Japanese: 合宿スタート！復活の×天バスター！！)	August 5, 2017
20 (185)	"Grim Reaper vs. Gaito! The Third Turn of Destiny!"; Transliteration: "Shinigami VS Gaito! Unmei no Dai San Tān!!" (Japanese: 死神VS死の宣告！運命の第三ターン！！)	August 12, 2017
21 (186)	"Tag Match! Kanata and Athora's Crossed Wires!"; Transliteration: "Taggu Matchi! Surechigau Kanata to Atora!!" (Japanese: タッグマッチ！すれ違うカナタとアトラ！！)	August 19, 2017
22 (187)	"Gao and Batzz! The Starry Sky Promise!"; Transliteration: "Gaō to Battsu! Hoshizora no Chikai!!" (Japanese: 牙王とバッツ！星空の誓い！！)	August 26, 2017
23 (188)	"Batzz's Overturn! Thunder Emperor's Formation Complete!"; Transliteration: "Battsu Gekiten! Kaminari tei Fōmēshon Kansei!!" (Japanese: バッツ逆天！雷帝フォーメーション完成！！)	September 2, 2017
24 (189)	"Overkill! Brutal of the Martial Arts!"; Transliteration: "Gyaku Tensatsu! Tōgi no Burūtaru!!" (Japanese: 逆天殺！闘技のブルータル！！)	September 9, 2017
25 (190)	"Birth! Overturn Black Death Dragon!"; Transliteration: "Tanjō! Gyaku Ten no Kuro Shiryō!!" (Japanese: 誕生！逆天の黒死竜！！)	September 16, 2017
26 (191)	"Guru vs. Wisdom! The Shocking Geargod VIII!"; Transliteration: "Shishō VS Wizudamu! Shōgeki no Giagoddo VIII!!" (Japanese: 師匠VSウィズダム！衝撃のギアゴッドVIII！！)	September 23, 2017
27 (192)	"Assemble! Thunder Empire!"; Transliteration: "Shūketsu! Raitei Army!!" (Japanese: 集結！雷帝軍！！)	September 30, 2017
28 (193)	"Overturn versus Overkill! Unleash the X-Tempest Ulti-Buster!"; Transliteration: "Gyaku ten VS Gyaku Tensatsu Hanate! X-Ten Arutimetto Basutā!!" (Japanese: 逆天VS逆天殺 放て！×天アルティメットバスター！！)	October 7, 2017
29 (194)	"Invasion of Papa Panda! Farewell, Chibi Panda!"; Transliteration: "Papa Panda Raishū! Saraba, Chibi Panda!!" (Japanese: パパパンダ来襲！さらば、ちびパンダ！！)	October 14, 2017
30 (195)	"Infinite Slashes! Demonic Descent Sword of the King, Laevateinn!"; Transliteration: "Mugen Zangeki! Gōma-ō Ken Revuantin!!" (Japanese: 無限斬撃！降魔王剣レヴァンティン！！)	October 21, 2017
31 (196)	"Perfectly Ignored Fighter, Slide Kidoku!"; Transliteration: "Pāfekuto Surū Faitā! Kidoku Surū!!" (Japanese: パーフェクトスルーファイター！気毒スルー！！)	October 28, 2017
32 (197)	"The Demon Sword Draws Near! Keisetsu's Overkill!"; Transliteration: "Semaru Maken! Keisetsu no Gyaku Tensatsu!!" (Japanese: 迫る魔剣！ケイセツの逆天殺！！)	November 5, 2017
33 (198)	"The Power of Overturn! Heavenly Crystal Dragon Aldo Athora"; Transliteration: "Gyaku ten no Chikara! Tenshō Ryū Arudo Atora!!" (Japanese: 逆天の力！天晶竜アルドアトラ！！)	November 12, 2017
34 (199)	"Gaito versus Artificial Intelligence! Explosion of the Mini Geargods!!"; Transliteration: "Gaito VS Jinkō Chinō! Bakuretsu no Mini Giagoddo!!" (Japanese: ガイトVS人工知能！爆裂のミニギアゴッド！！)	November 19, 2017
35 (200)	"Will it Reach Keisetsu? Kanata's New Impact Shot!"; Transliteration: "Keisetsu ni Todoke! Kanata no Shin Hissatsu Shūto!!" (Japanese: ケイセツに届け！カナタの新必殺シュート！！)	November 26, 2017
36 (201)	"CHAOS Transcendent, Geargod ver. 099"; Transliteration: "C no Chōetsu-Sha! Giagoddo ver. Ø 99!!" (Japanese: Cの超越者！ギアゴッドver.Ø99！！)	December 2, 2017
37 (202)	"Geargod's Overkill! Gao in Dire Straits!"; Transliteration: "Giagoddo no Gyaku Tensatsu! Oitsume Rareta Kiba!!" (Japanese: ギアゴッドの逆天殺！追いつめられた牙！！)	December 9, 2017
38 (203)	"Grasp it! The Power Beyond Overturn!!"; Transliteration: "Tsukame! Gekiten o Koeru Chikara!!" (Japanese: 掴め！逆天を超える力！！)	December 16, 2017
39 (204)	"Thunder Empire of Friendship! Geargod Rebels?!"; Transliteration: "Yūjō no Kaminari Tei-Gun Giagoddo Hanran!?" (Japanese: 友情の雷帝軍 ギアゴッド反乱！？)	December 23, 2017
40 (205)	"A New Buddy! The Clockwork Mighty Sun Fighter!"; Transliteration: "Aratana Badi! Kikaiji Kake no Taiyō Banchō!!" (Japanese: 新たなバディ！機械じかけの太陽番長！！)	January 6, 2018
41 (206)	"Gao versus CHAOS Gao! Autodeity Formation Completed!"; Transliteration: "Gaō VS Kaosu Gaō! Hatagami Fōmēshon Kansei!!" (Japanese: 牙王VSカオス牙王！機神フォーメーション完成！！)	January 13, 2018
42 (207)	"Buddy Breakup! Farewell, Batzz!"; Transliteration: "Badi Kaisan! Saraba Battsu!!" (Japanese: バディ解散！さらばバッツ！！)	January 20, 2018
43 (208)	"Turbulent Warlord Dragon, Barlbatzz Dragoroyale!"; Transliteration: "Gōten Haō Ryū! Bārubattsu Doraguroiyā!!" (Japanese: 轟天覇王竜！バールバッツ・ドラグロイヤー！！)	January 27, 2018
44 (209)	"Behold! This is Batzz's Overthrow!"; Transliteration: "Miyo! Kore ga Battsu no Dai Gyaku Tenda!!" (Japanese: 見よ！これがバッツの大逆天だ！！)	February 3, 2018
45 (210)	"Robo of Urban Legends? Hanako WC Appears!"; Transliteration: "Toshi Densetsu Robo? Hanako WC Kōrin!!" (Japanese: 都市伝説ロボ？ハナコWC降臨！！)	February 10, 2018
46 (211)	"Shine Bright! Shining Dragoner, Jackknife!!"; Transliteration: "Kagayake! Gyaku Takashi sei Ryū Jakkunaifu!!" (Japanese: 輝け！逆天星竜ジャックナイフ！！)	February 17, 2018
47 (212)	"The Power that Surpasses Deities! The Ultimate Chaos!"; Transliteration: "Kami o Koeru Chikara! Kyūkyoku ni Itaru Kaosu!!" (Japanese: 神を超える力！究極に至るカオス！！)	February 24, 2018
48 (213)	"Gao versus Keisetsu! Return of the Chaos Three!"; Transliteration: "Gaō VS Keisetsu! Kaettekita Kaosu Surī!!" (Japanese: 牙王VSケイセツ！帰ってきたカオススリー！！)	March 3, 2018
49 (214)	"Wisdom's Ambition! The Terrifying Upgrade Declaration!"; Transliteration: "Wizudamu no Yabō! Kyōfu no Appugurēdo Sengen!!" (Japanese: ウィズダムの野望！恐怖のアップグレード宣言！！)	March 10, 2018
50 (215)	"Final Plan Activated! New World Chaos!"; Transliteration: "Saishū Keikaku Shidō! Kaosu-ka Suru Sekai!!" (Japanese: 最終計画始動！カオス化する世界！！)	March 17, 2018
51 (216)	"Final Battle! Gao Mikado versus Wisdom!"; Transliteration: "Saishū Kessen! Mikado Gaō VS Wizudamu!!" (Japanese: 最終決戦！未門牙王VSウィズダム！！)	March 24, 2018
52 (217)	"Win Gao! The Last Buddyfight!"; Transliteration: "Kate Gaō! Saigo no Badifaito!!" (Japanese: 勝て牙王！最後のバディファイト！！)	March 31, 2018

== Future Card Buddyfight X All Star Fight ==
Opening Theme

- Buddyfighter x Buddyfighter by Jun Shirota (eps. 53–60)

Ending Theme

- B.O.F by Poppin'Party (eps. 53–60)

No.	Title	Original release date
53 (218)	"The GGG Cup Opens! All-Star Assemble!"; Transliteration: "GGG Kappu Kaisai! Ōrusutā Dai Shūgō!" (Japanese: GGGカップ開催！オールスター大集合!)	April 7, 2018
After the battle against wisdom life has settle for Gao until he ask Guru for an amazing Buddyfight and turns it into a selective tournament. Later, Gao is reunited with his old friend.
54 (219)	"Gao versus Kanata! Batzz, Drum, and Bal, United!"; Transliteration: "Gao VS Kanata! Battsu Dramu Baru Seizoroi!!" (Japanese: 牙王VSカナタ！バッツ・ドラム・バル勢ぞろい!!)	April 14, 2018
55 (220)	"Final Boss All-Out Attack! Who's the Bad Guy?"; Transliteration: "Rasubosu sō shingeki! Warumono wa dare da!" (Japanese: ラスボス総進撃！ワルモノは誰だ!!)	April 21, 2018
56 (221)	"Paruko's a Baby? Gao's First Commentary!"; Transliteration: "Paru ko ga babu~! Gaō, hajimete no jikkyō!!" (Japanese: パル子がバブ～っ！牙王、初めての実況！！)	April 28, 2018
57 (222)	"Burn Brightly, Noboru! A Tear-Soaked Serious Buddyfight!"; Transliteration: "Moeyo Noboru! Namida no Gachinko Faito!" (Japanese: 燃えよノボル！涙のガチンコファイト!!)	May 5, 2018
58 (223)	"Dauntless! Purgatory Knight versus Supreme Dragon Deity of Creations!"; Transliteration: "Sōzetsu! Rengoku kishi VS Sōsei no Chō-Ryūjin!!" (Japanese: 壮絶！煉獄騎士VS創世の超竜神!!)	May 12, 2018
59 (224)	"Showdown of Destiny! Gao Mikado versus Tasuku Ryuenji!"; Transliteration: "Shukumei no taiketsu! Mikado Gao VS Ryuenji Tasuku!!" (Japanese: 宿命の対決!未門牙王VS龍炎寺タスク!!)	May 19, 2018
60 (225)	"See you again! Mighty Sun Fighter Forever!"; Transliteration: "Mata na! Taiyō Banchō yo eien ni!!" (Japanese: またな！太陽番長よ永遠に！！)	May 26, 2018

== Future Card Buddyfight Ace ==
Opening Theme

- Saikō (Sā Ikō)! (Let's Go!) by Poppin' Party (eps. 1-43)

Ending Theme

- Buddy☆Funny Days by Takumi Mano (as Yuga Mikado) & Kobayashi Daiki (as Subaru Hoshiyomi) & Shūta Morishima (as Masato Rikuo) (Japanese) Brian P (English) (eps. 1-22)
- Niji no Yakusoku by Shūta Morishima (eps. 23–43)

No.	Title	Original release date
1 (226)	"Deity of Combat! Gargantua Dragon!!"; Transliteration: "Tatakai no kami! Garuganchua Doragon!!" (Japanese: 闘いの神! ガルガンチュア・ドラゴン!!)	June 2, 2018
2 (227)	"Friendship Battle! Yuga versus Ranma!"; Transliteration: "Yuujou taiketsu！Yuga baasasu Ranma!!" (Japanese: 友情対決！友牙VSランマ！！)	June 9, 2018
3 (228)	"Clash of the Aces! Ace of Games vs. Ace of Study!"; Transliteration: "Gekitotsu! Asobi no Kami baasasu Benkyou no Kami!" (Japanese: 激突！遊びの神VS勉強の神！！)	June 16, 2018
4 (229)	"The Transfer Student is the Ace of Sports!"; Transliteration: "Tenkōsei wa supo-tsu no kami!" (Japanese: 転校生はスポーツの神！)	June 23, 2018
5 (230)	"It's Finally Begun! The ABC Cup!"; Transliteration: "Tsuini sutato! Eibishi kappu!!" (Japanese: ついにスタート！ABCカップ！！)	June 30, 2018
6 (231)	"Ranma's Wild Charge! I'm The One Who'll Win!"; Transliteration: "Ranma mōkō! Katsu no wa ore da ze xi!!" (Japanese: ランマ猛攻！勝つのはオレだぜィ！！)	July 7, 2018
7 (232)	"Mel's Adventures in Fairyland! Reverse Subaru's Curse!"; Transliteration: "O togi no kuni no meru! Tokihanate, Subaru sama no noroi!" (Japanese: おとぎの国のメル！解き放て、スバル様の呪い！)	July 14, 2018
8 (233)	"A Deity Descents! Electrodeity of Light, Amaterasu!"; Transliteration: "Kōrin! Hikari nodenshin amaterasu!!" (Japanese: 降臨！光の電神アマテラス！！)	July 21, 2018
9 (234)	"Defend the Peace! Galaxy Exalt Cosmoman!"; Transliteration: "Mamore heiwa o! Ginga chōjin Kosumoman!!" (Japanese: 守れ平和を！ 銀河超人コスモマン！！)	July 28, 2018
10 (235)	"Win the Rematch! Yuga versus Subaru!"; Transliteration: "Hatase ribenji! Yuga basasu Subaru!!" (Japanese: 果たせリベンジ！友牙VSスバル！！)	August 4, 2018
11 (236)	"ABC Cup Finals! Yuga versus Masato!!"; Transliteration: "ABC kappu kesshou! Yuga basasu Masato!!" (Japanese: ABCカップ決勝！友牙VSマサト！！)	August 11, 2018
12 (237)	"Who's the Academy's Best Fighter!? The Card that Decides Victory!"; Transliteration: "Gakuen saikyouha dareda!? Shouri wo kimeru kaado!" (Japanese: 学園最強は誰だ！？勝利を決めるカード！)	August 18, 2018
13 (238)	"Lost World! Vile Demonic Dragon, Vanity Husk Destroyer! Part 1"; Transliteration: "Rosuto waarudo! Kyōran ma Ryū Xanithi Mukuro Desutoroiya!! Zenpen" (Japanese: ロストワールド！凶乱魔竜ヴァニティ・骸・デストロイヤー！！－前編－)	August 25, 2018
14 (239)	"Lost World! Vile Demonic Dragon, Vanity Husk Destroyer! Part 2"; Transliteration: "Rosuto waarudo! Kyōran ma Ryū Xanithi Mukuro Desutoroiya!! Kōhen" (Japanese: ロストワールド！ 凶乱魔竜ヴァニティ・骸・デストロイヤー!! －後編－)	September 1, 2018
15 (240)	"Get Stronger, Yuga! A New Beginning!"; Transliteration: "Tsuyoku nare tomo Yuga! Aratanaru suta-to!!" (Japanese: 強くなれ友牙！新たなるスタート！！)	September 8, 2018
16 (241)	"Shop Preliminaries Begin! Samurai versus Ninja!"; Transliteration: "Shoppu yosen kaishi! Samurai basasu Ninja!!" (Japanese: ショップ予選開始！侍VS忍者！！)	September 15, 2018
17 (242)	"Checkmate!! Ace of Study versus Chess Genius!"; Transliteration: "Tyekkumeito! Benkyō no kami basasu tyesu no tensai!!" (Japanese: チェックメイト！勉強の神VSチェスの天才！！)	September 22, 2018
18 (243)	"Our New Ally? A Non-Evil Da-Dan?!"; Transliteration: "Aratana nakama? Warukunai Da Dan!?" (Japanese: 新たな仲間？悪くないダ★ダーン!?)	September 29, 2018
19 (244)	"The Vile Ranma Channel Debuts? Return of Lost World!"; Transliteration: "Ranma channeru kaisetsu!? Rosuto warudo futatabi!" (Japanese: 乱魔チャンネル開設！？ロストワールド再び！)	October 6, 2018
20 (245)	"Target: Miko! A Kidnapped Cat?!"; Transliteration: "Nerai wa Miko! Ubawareta neko!?" (Japanese: 狙いはミコ！奪われたネコ！？)	October 13, 2018
21 (246)	"Yuga and Banjoe! A Fiery Fight!"; Transliteration: "Yuga to Banjō! Honoo no faito!!" (Japanese: 友牙とバンジョウ！炎のファイト！！)	October 20, 2018
22 (247)	"Masato or Kanesada? Shop Preliminary Finals!"; Transliteration: "Masato ka Kanesada ka! Shoppu yosen fainaru!!" (Japanese: マサトかカネサダか！ショップ予選ファイナル！！)	October 27, 2018
23 (248)	"The Second Round begins! A Challenge from Vile Ranma!"; Transliteration: "Mahōtsukai Garuga! Majikku warudo no faito!!" (Japanese: 二次予選スタート！乱魔からの挑戦状！！)	November 3, 2018
24 (249)	"Mage Garga! A Magic World Buddyfight!"; Transliteration: "Mahōtsukai Garuga! Majikku warudo no faito!!" (Japanese: 魔法使いガルガ！マジックワールドのファイト!!)	November 10, 2018
25 (250)	"The Third Lost World Fighter! Enter the MAX Dragons!"; Transliteration: "Rosuto daisan no faita! Saikyō ryūgen ru!!" (Japanese: ロスト第三のファイター！最強竜現る!!)	November 17, 2018
26 (251)	"A New Lost World Ally!"; Transliteration: "Aratanaru rosuto no nakama" (Japanese: 新たなるロストの仲間)	November 24, 2018
27 (252)	"The Secret Origin of the Linkdragon Order! Get Stronger, Agito!"; Transliteration: "Kizuna ryūdan tanjō hiwa! Tsuyokunare agito!!" (Japanese: 絆竜団誕生秘話！強くなれアギト！！)	December 1, 2018
28 (253)	"One Shot Victory! Gattling Mode!"; Transliteration: "Ichigeki hisshō! Modo gatoringu!!" (Japanese: 一撃必勝！ モード・ガトリング！！)	December 8, 2018
29 (254)	"I'm going to play too! Buddyfight!"; Transliteration: "Boku datte yaru zo! Badifaito!!" (Japanese: ボクだってやるぞ！ バディファイト！！)	December 15, 2018
30 (255)	"Who Will Win? Subaru Versus Masato!"; Transliteration: "Katsu no wa dotchi da!? Subaru VS Masato!!" (Japanese: 勝つのはどっちだ！？ スバルVSマサト！！)	December 22, 2018
31 (256)	"The Guardian of Order, Eden Hanazono!"; Transliteration: "Chitsujo no shugosha, Hanazono Eden" (Japanese: 秩序の守護者 花園エデン)	January 5, 2019
32 (257)	"Major Evolution! Vile Demonic Deity Dragon, Vanity Epoch Destroyer!"; Transliteration: "Dai shinka! Kyōran majin ryū vanithi koku desutoroiya!!" (Japanese: 大進化！凶乱魔神竜ヴァニティ・刻・デストロイヤー!!)	January 12, 2019
33 (258)	"Light Kurouzu! Battle of Destiny!"; Transliteration: "Kurouzu raito! Unmei no tatakai!!" (Japanese: 黒渦ライト！ 運命の闘い!!)	January 19, 2019
34 (259)	"Da Dan Rebels! The Forbidden Coup D'Etat!"; Transliteration: "Da ★ Dān hanran! Kindan no kūdetā!!" (Japanese: ダ★ダーン反乱！禁断のクーデター！！)	January 26, 2019
35 (260)	"Garga's Major Evolution! Activate, Deity G.Evo!"; Transliteration: "Garuga dai shinka! Hatsudō!! Kami G ebo!!!" (Japanese: ガルガ大進化！ 発動！！ 神G・EVO！！！)	February 2, 2019
36 (261)	"Unhappy! Vile Ranma versus Rei Urameshi!"; Transliteration: "Anhappī! Ranma vs Urameshi!!" (Japanese: アンハッピー！ 乱魔vs怨巳矢レイ!!)	February 9, 2019
37 (262)	"Final Battle! Masato versus Daijirou!"; Transliteration: "Saishū kessen! Masato VS Daishirō!!" (Japanese: 最終決戦！ マサトVS大志郎!!)	February 16, 2019
38 (263)	"Come Back, My Friend! Casting a Spell with a Wish!"; Transliteration: "Modore tomoyo! Negai o kometa kyasuto!!" (Japanese: もどれ友よ！ 願いを込めたキャスト！！)	February 23, 2019
39 (264)	"Ace Buddyfighters, Assemble!"; Transliteration: "Kami faitāda yo! Zen'in shūgō!!" (Japanese: 神ファイターだヨ！ 全員集合!!)	March 2, 2019
40 (265)	"Vile Demonic Husk Deity Dragon, Vanity End Destroyer!"; Transliteration: "Kyō ran ma mukuro shin Ryū Vuaniti tsui Desutoroiyā!" (Japanese: 凶乱魔骸神竜ヴァニティ・終・デストロイヤー！)	March 9, 2019
41 (266)	"Who Will Use It? The Anti-Lost Weapon!"; Transliteration: "Dare ga tsukau? Tai rosuto heiki! (Anchirosuto uepon)" (Japanese: 誰が使う？ 対ロスト兵器！(アンチロスト・ウエポン))	March 16, 2019
42 (267)	"Final Battle! Yuga versus Vile Ranma!"; Transliteration: "Kesshōsen! Yuga VS Ranma!!" (Japanese: 決勝戦！友牙 VS 乱魔！！)	March 23, 2019
43 (268)	"Let It Loose! Deity Creations Fangflare, Gargantua Punisher!"; Transliteration: "Hanate! Kami Hajime Ran Kiba Garuganchua Panisshā!!" (Japanese: 放て！神創乱牙ガルガンチュア・パニッシャー！！)	March 30, 2019
