= Shuta Morishima =

Japanese voice actor

- 森嶋 秀太
- Born: 13 August 1983 (age 43)
- Occupations: Voice actor; keyboardist
- Years active: 2010–present
- Employer: Hibiki
- Notable work: Cardfight!! Vanguard as Shin Nitta; Ishida & Asakura as Mitsunori Ishida; DD Fist of the North Star as Bat; Future Card Buddyfight as Baku Omori; Langrisser Re:Incarnation Tensei as Ares; Ao Oni: The Animation as Takeshi; Try Knights as Pearce Valentine Shōtani; From Argonavis as Rio Kikyō; Cardfight!! Vanguard overDress as Masanori Iseki

Shuta Morishita (Japanese: 森嶋 秀太, Hepburn: Morishima Shūta; born 13 August 1983) is a Japanese voice actor and keyboardist affiliated with Hibiki. He is known for voicing Shin Nitta in Cardfight!! Vanguard, Mitsunori Ishida in Ishida & Asakura, Bat in DD Fist of the North Star, Baku Omori in Future Card Buddyfight, Ares in Langrisser Re:Incarnation Tensei, Takeshi in Ao Oni: The Animation, Masato Rikuō in Future Card Buddyfight Ace, Pearce Valentine Shōtani in Try Knights, Rio Kikyō in From Argonavis, Masanori Iseki in Cardfight!! Vanguard overDress, Ushiwaka in Bikkuri-Men, and Sōtarō Shinozaki in Tasūketsu.

== Biography ==
Morishima, a native of Toyosaka, Niigata, was born on 13 August 1983; he is an only child. He was educated at the Niigata University of International and Information Studies, graduating from the 2005 Komiyama Laboratory seminar.

During his third year at a company where he worked as a programmer, Morishima decided to go to a voice acting training school, thinking that "when [he] retire[s] or die[s], [he] will regret not doing what [he] love[s]". He had been inspired to go into voice acting by The Prince of Tennis, watching every episode on rented home media releases while staying up all night for five days. He was part of the RAMS Professional Education fifth graduating class.

He starred as Shin Nitta in the first season of Cardfight!! Vanguard, which aired from 2011 until 2012, and he reprised this role in the stage adaptations Cardfight!! Vanguard: Virtual Stage (2016) and Cardfight!! Vanguard: Virtual Stage: Link Joker (2017) and in the 2018 anime Cardfight!! Vanguard Prime. He later starred as Masanori Iseki in Cardfight!! Vanguard overDress and its sequel Cardfight!! Vanguard DivineZ. He was part of Bushi 7, a tie-in unit who sang "V-Road", the theme song of Cardfight!! Vanguard: Legion Mate.

In addition to Cardfight!! Vanguard, Morishima has also appeared in other Bushiroad media. In September 2013, it was announced that he would star as Tsukiyomi in the film adaptation of Bushiroad's Neppu Kairiku Bushi Road franchise. He starred as Baku Omori in Future Card Buddyfight and as Masato Rikuō in the 2018 sequel Future Card Buddyfight Ace. In May 2018, Morishima joined Bushiroad's From Argonavis project, and later became the keyboardist of tie-in band Argonavis, playing Rio Kikyō. He was a guest at the 2017 Vanguard & Buddyfight Grand Festival at the Long Beach Convention and Entertainment Center and at CharaExpo USA 2018 at the Anaheim Convention Center.

In 2013, he starred as Mitsunori Ishida in Ishida & Asakura and Bat in DD Fist of the North Star. He later starred as Takeshi in Ao Oni: The Animation, Pearce Valentine Shōtani in Try Knights, Ushiwaka in Bikkuri-Men, and Sōtarō Shinozaki in Tasūketsu. In video games, he also voiced Ares, the protagonist of the video game Langrisser Re:Incarnation Tensei.

Morishima has a pet cat.

== Filmography ==
=== Anime series ===
Year	Title	Role(s)	Ref.
2010	Shokupan Mimi	Narrator	
2011	Cardfight!! Vanguard	Shin Nitta	
2013–2015	DD Fist of the North Star	Bat	
2013	Ishida & Asakura	Mitsunori Ishida	
2014	Chaika: The Coffin Princess	Matheus Caraway	
2014	Future Card Buddyfight	Baku Omori	
2014	Super Radical Gag Family	Hanamaruki	
2015	Kamisama Kiss	Isobe	
2016	Ao Oni: The Animation	Takeshi	
2016	Battery	Eiji Nobunishi	
2016	Ninja Girl & Samurai Master	Maeda Toshiie, Gyūichi Ōta	
2017	King's Game The Animation	Shōta Yashiro	
2017	Love Kome	Kurowa	
2018	Cardfight!! Vanguard Prime	Shin Nitta	
2018	Future Card Buddyfight Ace	Masato Rikuō	
2019	Taeko no Nichijō	Shūta Morishima	
2019	Try Knights	Pearce Valentine Shōtani	
2020	Argonavis from BanG Dream!	Rio Kikyō	
2021	Battle Athletes Victory ReSTART!	Johann Reinhardt Roberts	
2021	Cardfight!! Vanguard overDress	Masanori Iseki	
2023	Bikkuri-Men	Ushiwaka	
2023	Helck	Zeldion	
2024	Cardfight!! Vanguard DivineZ	Masanori Iseki	
2024	Tasūketsu	Sōtarō Shinozaki	

=== Anime films ===
Year	Title	Role(s)	Ref.
2013	Neppu Kairiku Bushi Road	Tsukiyomi	

=== Original net animation ===
Year	Title	Role(s)	Ref.
2018	Prison Lab	Harakawa	

=== Video games ===
Year	Title	Role(s)	Ref.
2015	Langrisser Re:Incarnation Tensei	Ares	
2019	Da Capo 4	Kanata	

=== Stage productions ===
Year	Title	Role(s)	Ref.
2016	Cardfight!! Vanguard: Virtual Stage	Shin Nitta	
2017	Cardfight!! Vanguard: Virtual Stage: Link Joker	Shin Nitta	
