= Cardfight!! Vanguard: Legion Mate =

- No. of episodes: 33

Release
- Original network: TV Tokyo
- Original release: March 9 – October 19, 2014

Series chronology
- ← Previous; Link Joker (season 3) Next → Cardfight!! Vanguard G

The fourth and final season of Cardfight!! Vanguard, titled Cardfight!! Vanguard: Legion Mate (Japanese: カードファイト!! ヴァンガード レギオンメイト編, Hepburn: Kādofaito!! Vangādo Region Meito Hen; lit. Legion Mate Chapter), aired on Japanese TV networks from March 9, 2014, to October 19, 2014, for a total of 33 episodes.

This is a list of episodes from the anime Cardfight!! Vanguard. In July 2010, an anime television series based on the game was green-lit by TMS Entertainment under the directorial supervision of Hatsuki Tsuji. Music is composed by Takayuki Negishi while Mari Tominaga provided the character designs. The series began airing in Japan on TV Aichi beginning on January 8, 2011, and rebroadcast by AT-X, TV Tokyo, TV Osaka, and TV Setouchi systems. The media-streaming website Crunchyroll simulcasted the first season to the United States, Canada, the United Kingdom, and Ireland. Crunchyroll began streaming the second season to the United States, Canada, and the United Kingdom on June 30, 2012.

Twenty-five pieces of theme music are used for the series—nine opening themes and seventeen closing themes (one of which is exclusive to the English dub). The anime also features two insert songs performed by Ultra Rare (i.e. Suzuko Mimori, Yoshino Nanjō, and Aimi Terakawa, who are the original Japanese voice actresses of Kourin, Rekka, and Suiko). The two songs are "Miracle Trigger ~Tomorrow Will Be Ultra Rare!~" (ミラクルトリガー ~きっと明日はウルトラレア!~) (used in episodes 18, 26, and 115; simply known as "Miracle Trigger" in the English dub) and "Stand Up! DREAM" (スタンドアップ! DREAM) (used in episodes 39, 115, and 118).

An English dub co-produced by Ocean Productions (recorded at Blue Water Studios) began airing on Singapore's Okto channel from October 16, 2011, on Animax Asia from January 22, 2012, and on Malaysia's RTM-TV2 channel from November 18, 2012. Dubbed episodes also began being released on YouTube from May 29, 2012. The series can be seen legally on a dedicated channel for it created by Bushiroad, the original creators and manufacturers of the card game, and as of June 25 is available for viewing in most countries without geo-blocking.

While there are a few changes, the English dub adaption is mostly faithful to the original Japanese version. However, the most notable change in the English dub is that three opening themes and three ending themes are used. The only openings are English versions of the first opening theme "Vanguard" (from eps. 1–65), the third opening theme "Limit Break" (from eps. 66–104), and the fourth opening theme "Vanguard Fight" (from eps. 105 onward), all of which are still performed by their original respective artists.

The first ending theme used in the dub is an English version of the third ending theme "Dream Shooter" (from eps. 1–65) while the second ending theme is a unique song titled "Way To Victory" (from eps. 66–104), both of which are performed by Sea☆A. The ending credit sequence for this exclusive theme is the one used for the original sixth ending theme "Jōnetsu-ism". The third ending theme used in the dub is an English version of the original ninth ending song "Endless☆Fighter" (from eps. 105 onward), which is performed only by Aimi Terakawa in the dub. Similarly, the Ultra Rare insert songs are performed in English by Suzuko Mimori, Yoshino Nanjō, and Aimi Terakawa (the original Japanese voice actresses of Kourin, Rekka, and Suiko).

Individual episodes from seasons 1-4 are known as "Rides".

== Overview ==
The fourth season shifts to focus on Toshiki Kai as he tries to find Aichi, whose existence seems to have been erased from everybody's memories. This season did not receive an English dub. Mainly to catch up with the recent season at the time, Vanguard G. But presumably due to instances like: the script writer for the Japanese version of Legion mates quitting, so there was no source material to interpret into the dub; the season was regarded as lackluster, full of plot holes, and doesn't add anything that was carried off into G. there has recently been a reply from Bushiroad stating that "there are currently no plans to dub legion mate", but then follows with something along the lines of "we'll talk about it"

== Theme songs ==
Opening theme

- "V-ROAD" by BUSHI★7 (DAIGO, Psychic Lover, Mimori, Kitta, Suara, and Shuta Morishima) (eps. 164–179)
- "KNOCK ON YOUR GATE!" by Masatoshi Ono (eps. 180–196)

Ending theme

- "Get Up" by FAKY (eps. 164–179)
- "Get back yourself" by CERASUS (eps. 180–196)

== Episode lists ==
No.	Title	Original release date
164	"Missing Leader"; Transliteration: "Kieta Sendōsha" (Japanese: 消(き)えた先(せん)導(どう)者(しゃ))	March 9, 2014
165	"Legion"; Transliteration: "Region" (Japanese: 双闘(レギオン))	March 16, 2014
166	"Aichi's Shadow"; Transliteration: "Aichi no Kage" (Japanese: アイチの影(かげ))	March 23, 2014
167	"Seek the Mate"; Transliteration: "Sīku za Meito" (Japanese: シーク・ザ・メイト)	March 30, 2014
168	"Naoki's Fist"; Transliteration: "Naoki no Kobushi" (Japanese: ナオキの拳(こぶし))	April 6, 2014
169	"Blue Flames Gaillard"; Transliteration: "Aoki Honō no Gaiyāru" (Japanese: 青(あお)き炎(ほのお)のガイヤール)	April 13, 2014
170	"Steel Neve"; Transliteration: "Hagane no Nēvu" (Japanese: 鋼(はがね)のネーヴ)	April 20, 2014
171	"The Leader, Kai"; Transliteration: "Sendōsha Kai" (Japanese: 先(せん)導(どう)者(しゃ)・櫂(かい))	April 27, 2014
172	"Introducing Great Daikaiser!"; Transliteration: "Gurēto Daikaizā Kenzan!" (Japanese: グレートダイカイザー見(けん)参(ざん)！)	May 4, 2014
173	"Illusional Rati"; Transliteration: "Gen'ei no Rati" (Japanese: 幻(げん)影(えい)のラティ)	May 11, 2014
174	"Freezing Ice Serra"; Transliteration: "Itetsuku Kōri no Sera" (Japanese: 凍(い)てつく氷(こおり)のセラ)	May 18, 2014
175	"Ren's Promise"; Transliteration: "Ren no Yakusoku" (Japanese: レンの約(やく)束(そく))	May 25, 2014
176	"The Place Where Aichi Will Return"; Transliteration: "Aichi no Modoru Basho" (Japanese: アイチの戻(もど)る場(ば)所(しょ))	June 1, 2014
177	"The Announced Truth"; Transliteration: "Tsugerareta Shinjitsu" (Japanese: 告(つ)げられた真(しん)実(じつ))	June 8, 2014
178	"Island Awaiting the Wind"; Transliteration: "Kaze no Matsu Shima" (Japanese: 風(かぜ)の待(ま)つ島(しま))	June 15, 2014
179	"Kai's Will"; Transliteration: "Kai no Ishi" (Japanese: 櫂(かい)の意(い)志(し))	June 22, 2014
180	"Gateway to Sanctuary"; Transliteration: "Seīki e no Tobira" (Japanese: 聖(せい)域(いき)への扉(とびら))	June 29, 2014
181	"Manly Big Bang"; Transliteration: "Otokogi Bigu Ban" (Japanese: 男(おとこ)気(ぎ)爆発(ビグバン))	July 6, 2014
182	"Steel Will"; Transliteration: "Hagane no Ishi" (Japanese: 鋼(はがね)の意(い)志(し))	July 13, 2014
183	"What Doesn't Change"; Transliteration: "Kawaranai Mono" (Japanese: かわらないもの)	July 20, 2014
184	"Vow of the Blue Flames"; Transliteration: "Aoki Honō no Chikai" (Japanese: 青(あお)き炎(ほのお)の誓(ちかい)い)	July 27, 2014
185	"Flames of Perdition"; Transliteration: "Rengoku no Honō" (Japanese: 煉(れん)獄(ごく)の炎(ほのお))	August 3, 2014
186	"Interrupted Sleep"; Transliteration: "Tokareta Nemuri" (Japanese: 解(と)かれた眠(ねむ)り)	August 10, 2014
187	"Aichi Awakens"; Transliteration: "Aichi Kakusei" (Japanese: アイチ覚(かく)醒(せい))	August 17, 2014
188	"Cold Ambition"; Transliteration: "Tsumetai Yabō" (Japanese: 冷(つめ)たい野(や)望(ぼう))	August 24, 2014
189	"Omega's Resurrection"; Transliteration: "Fukkatsu no Omega" (Japanese: 復(ふっ)活(かつ)のオメガ)	August 31, 2014
190	"Determination of the Bluish Flames"; Transliteration: "Aoki Honō no Ketsui" (Japanese: 青(あお)き炎(ほのお)の決(けつ)意(い))	September 7, 2014
191	"Our Place"; Transliteration: "Oretachi no Basho" (Japanese: 俺(おれ)達(たち)の場(ば)所(しょ))	September 14, 2014
192	"Pride of the Flames"; Transliteration: "Honō no Iji" (Japanese: 炎(ほのお)の意(い)地(じ))	September 21, 2014
193	"Sword of Destruction"; Transliteration: "Hametsu no Tsurugi" (Japanese: 破(は)滅(めつ)の剣(けん))	September 28, 2014
194	"Sword of Courage"; Transliteration: "Yūki no Tsurugi" (Japanese: 勇(ゆう)気(き)の剣(けん))	October 5, 2014
195	"A Season of Journeys"; Transliteration: "Tabidachi no Kisetsu" (Japanese: 旅(たび)立(だ)ちの季(き)節(せつ))	October 12, 2014
196	"The Vanguards"; Transliteration: "Sendōsha-tachi" (Japanese: 先(せん)導(どう)者(しゃ)たち)	October 19, 2014
