= Cardfight!! Vanguard season 1 =

Cardfight!! Vanguard season 1 may refer to:

- Cardfight!! Vanguard season 1 (2011 series), the first-season of the 2011 series Cardfight!! Vanguard
- Cardfight!! Vanguard season 1 (2018 series), the first-season of the 2018 series Cardfight!! Vanguard (V series)
