= Tobot =

South Korean transformation television series

- Opening title card for the English dub
- Directed by: Nico
- Country of origin: South Korea
- Original language: Korean
- No. of seasons: 4 (English version); 19 (Korean version)
- No. of episodes: 102 (English version); 392 (Korean version)

Production
- Producers: Young Toys; Retrobot; Studio Button (Tobot V/Tobot Galaxy Detectives)
- Running time: 22 minutes (English version)

Original release
- Network: JEI TV; Tooniverse
- Release: March 2010 – December 2023

Template:Auidence

Tobot (Korean: 변신자동차 또봇; RR: Byeonsinjadongcha Ttobot) is a South Korean animated television series for preschool age and younger school from 4 to 7 years old children which produced by Young Toys and Retrobot. The series features transforming cars, and some of them can fly like Tobot W or Tobot Y

The series is available in Korean and English on Young Toys' official YouTube channel. The toy line beat Lego as South Korea's most popular toy line in 2013.

An official English dub was produced in Canada by Ocean Productions and its sister studio Blue Water Studios, airing over a few months in 2018. This version was available on Netflix.

A spinoff series known as Athlon Tobot aired in three seasons from 2016 to 2017, before getting rebooted in 2018 as Tobot V (in English dub version known as Tobot: Galaxy Detectives), with animation done by Studio Button, an animation studio that made Jurassic Cops & Fire Robo, instead of Retrobot (which also created Biklonz & Potendogs). Like the original, Galaxy Detectives is also available on Netflix. Tobot V lasted for three and a half seasons from 2018 to 2022, and a sequel to the original series was released in 2023. Retrobot once again animates for the series, known as Tobot: Heroes of Daedo City/Daedo's Heroes, featuring new Tobots designed after Hyundai vehicles instead of Kia.

== Plot ==
While investigating a string of mysterious car accidents, Dr. Franklin Char is abducted by the perpetrators. This incident activates his creations called "Tobots", cars that transform into robots with a special key called a "Tokey". Dr. Char's first two Tobots, Tobot X and Tobot Y, are entrusted to his twin sons Ryan and Kory, respectively, to fight crime and protect their neighborhood.

== Production ==
Title card of Tobot Galaxy Detectives (or Tobot V)

Young Toys came up with the idea of developing an animated series and related toys during the early 2000s. While Transformers and Power Rangers are popular among older elementary school children, Young Toys decided to market Tobot to younger primary school children and kindergarteners. Rather than obtain licenses from animation studios after production, Young Toys did the opposite by developing the animated series and characters from scratch before producing the toys.

== Marketing ==
Between August and October 2014, Young Toys sold the licenses for the Tobot toys and characters to Southeast Asian nations. The series was made available in some Middle Eastern countries in January 2015.

In December 2014, Young Toys erected an eight-meter, three ton statue of Deltatron at the Sky Park outside Seoul's Lotte Mall Gimpo International Airport shopping complex to commemorate the fifth anniversary of Tobot. The statue was on display until 2019.
