= Ocean Productions =

Canadian media production company

Ocean Productions, Inc.
- Type: Private company
- Industry: IP development co-production brand development and support
- Genre: Live action and animation
- Founded: 1974; 52 years ago
- Founder: Ken Morrison; Dave Thomas
- Headquarters: Vancouver, British Columbia, Canada
- Key people: Ken Morrison; Diana Gage; Troy A. Taillon; Keith A. Goddard; Karl Willems

Ocean Productions, Inc., is a Canadian media production and dubbing company, based in Vancouver, British Columbia, that is part of the Ocean Group of businesses. Ocean Group is involved in intellectual property acquisition and development, co-production and the creation of English versions of non-English animation for international distribution.

The Group also works with global toy companies and producers to create and distribute animation properties in conjunction with game development as well as licensing and merchandising programs.

Ocean Media Inc. creates world master versions of programming to promote intellectual properties on a global basis. The company's productions are recorded at Ocean Studios (originally known as Ocean Sound) in Vancouver and Blue Water Studios in Calgary and Edmonton, Alberta.

== History ==
Founded by Ken Morrison and Dave Thomas in 1974, the company, then known as Ocean Sound, originally started as a North Vancouver-based music recording studio. Musicians such as Art Bergmann, Chilliwack, D.O.A and k.d. lang recorded albums and songs there.

In 1979, Ocean moved to its current location in the Kitsilano community. Sometime after, the company began producing voice over work for animation. By the late 1990s, Ocean claimed to control about 85% of the market for animation voice-over in Vancouver. During this time, Ocean was one of the largest production houses working on English-language versions of Japanese anime series. Among others, the company's clients included AB Groupe, ADK Holdings, Capcom, Bandai Entertainment, Central Park Media, Geneon Entertainment, Nelvana, Saban Entertainment, and Viz Media.

Ocean now works on animation and live action media from around the world.

== List of works ==
=== Ocean Studios ===
These series were produced at Ocean Studios in Vancouver, British Columbia.

==== Live action ====
- Dark Soldier D
- Death Note
- Death Note 2: The Last Name
- If I Were an Animal
- L: Change the World
- Ultraman Zearth
- Ultraman Zearth 2: Superhuman War

==== Western animation ====
- A Monkey's Tale
- A New Kind of Magic
- Adventures of Sam the Squirrel
- Animated Classic Showcase
- Asterix: The Mansions of the Gods (Canadian English dub)
- Asterix: The Secret of the Magic Potion
- Bibi and Tina
- Billy the Cat
- Capertown Cops
- Coach Me If You Can
- Conan the Adventurer
- Cosmic Quantum Ray
- Cybersix
- Cyboars (1997)
- Delook and Sharpy
- Dive Olly Dive and the Octopus Rescue
- Exosquad
- Fantastic Four: World's Greatest Heroes
- Heroes on Hot Wheels
- Hulk vs. Thor
- Hulk vs. Wolverine
- Iron Man: Armored Adventures
- Kaeloo
- Kong: The Animated Series
- The Little Prince
- Mega Man
- Mr. Magoo
- Mune: Guardian of the Moon
- NASCAR Racers
- Next Avengers: Heroes of Tomorrow
- The New Adventures of Peter Pan
- Norm of the North: Family Vacation
- Norm of the North: Keys to the Kingdom
- Norm of the North: King Sized Adventure
- Planet Hulk
- Robin and the Dreamweavers
- Rock Dog 2: Rock Around the Park
- Rock Dog 3: Battle the Beat
- Roswell Conspiracies: Aliens, Myths and Legends
- Sabrina: Secrets of a Teenage Witch
- Skysurfer Strike Force
- Spider-Man Unlimited
- Spiff and Hercules
- LoliRock
- Street Fighter
- Strawberry Shortcake's Berry Bitty Adventures
- Tara Duncan
- Thor: Tales of Asgard
- Troll Tales
- The True Adventures of Professor Thompson
- Ultimate Book of Spells
- Urmel
- Waldo's Way
- We're Lalaloopsy
- Worry Eaters
- X-Men: Evolution

==== International animation ====
- Biklonz (Young Toys)
- Mysteries and Feluda
- Flash and Dash
- L.O.R.D: Legend of Ravaging Dynasties
- Mix Master (MoonScoop Group)
- Super Kid (UM Productions)
- Tobot (Young Toys)
- Tobot Athlon (Young Toys)
- Tobot: Galaxy Detectives (Young Toys)

==== Anime ====
- .hack//Roots (Bandai Entertainment)
- A Chinese Ghost Story (Viz Media)
- Ayakashi: Samurai Horror Tales (Geneon) (Note: Prior to 2003, Geneon operated under the name Pioneer Entertainment.)
- Awol: Absent Without Leave (Bandai Entertainment)
- B-Daman Fireblast (ADK Emotions NY, Inc.)
- Beyblade Burst (ADK Emotions NY, Inc.)
  - Beyblade Burst Evolution (ADK Emotions NY, Inc.)
- Black Lagoon (Geneon)
- Black Lagoon: Roberta's Blood Trail (Funimation)
- Boys Over Flowers (Viz Media)
- Brain Powered (Bandai Entertainment)
- Cardcaptor Sakura (Nelvana, under the name Cardcaptors)
- Cardcaptor Sakura: The Movie (Geneon/Nelvana, under the name Cardcaptors: The Movie)
- The Daichis: Earth Defence Family (Geneon)
- Death Note (Viz Media)
- Dead Dead Demon's Dededede Destruction
- Dog Soldier (Central Park Media)
- Dokkoida?! (Geneon)
- Dragon Ball Z (Funimation/Saban (Episodes 1-67 [edited into 53 episodes]), Westwood Media (Episodes 123-291))
- Dragon Ball Z: Dead Zone (Funimation/Geneon)
- Dragon Ball Z: The Tree of Might (Funimation/Saban (edited into 3 episodes), Funimation/Geneon (uncut redub))
- Dragon Ball Z: The World's Strongest (Funimation/Geneon)
- Dragon Ball Z Kai (Episodes 1-98 (unreleased))
- Dragon Drive (Bandai Entertainment)
- Dragon Quest: The Adventure of Dai (2020) (Toei Animation)
- Eat-Man '98 (Bandai Entertainment)
- Earth Maiden Arjuna (Bandai Entertainment)
- Elemental Gelade (Geneon)
- Ehrgeiz (Bandai Entertainment)
- Escaflowne: The Movie (Bandai Entertainment)
- Fatal Fury: Legend of the Hungry Wolf (Viz Media)
- Fatal Fury 2: The New Battle (Viz Media)
- Fatal Fury: The Motion Picture (Viz Media)
- Future Boy Conan (Nippon Animation)
- Galaxy Angel (Bandai Entertainment)
- Ghost in the Shell: Stand Alone Complex - The Laughing Man (Bandai Entertainment)
- Ghost in the Shell: Stand Alone Complex - Individual Eleven (Bandai Entertainment)
- Gintama (Crunchyroll)
- The Girl Who Leapt Through Time (Bandai Entertainment)
- Glitzy Dolls Go Dating
- Green Legend Ran (Geneon)
- Grey: The Digital Target (Viz Media)
- Gundam Wing: Endless Waltz (Sunrise/Bandai Entertainment)
- The Hakkenden (Geneon)
- The Humanoid (OVA)|The Humanoid (Central Park Media)
- Hamtaro (Viz Media/Sho Pro Entertainment)
- Highlander: The Search for Vengeance (Manga Entertainment)
- Hikaru No Go (Viz Media)
- Human Crossing (Geneon)
- Infinite Ryvius (Bandai Entertainment)
- InuYasha (Sunrise/Viz Media)
- InuYasha: The Final Act (Sunrise/Viz Media)
- Jin-Roh (Bandai Entertainment/Viz Media)
- Junkers Come Here (Bandai Entertainment)
- Key the Metal Idol (Viz Media)
- Kishin Corps (Geneon)
- Kiznaiver (Crunchyroll)
- Kurozuka (Sony Pictures)
- Let's Go Quintuplets!
- Little Battlers eXperience (Dentsu)
- Maison Ikkoku (Viz Media)
- Master Keaton (Geneon)
- Meltylancer: The Animation (Bandai Entertainment)
- Mega Man (Dentsu Entertainment/Toei Animation)
- MegaMan NT Warrior (Viz Media/Sho Pro Entertainment)
- Mermaid's Scar (Viz Media)
- Mobile Suit Gundam (Sunrise/Bandai Entertainment)
- Mobile Suit Gundam 00 (Sunrise/Bandai Entertainment)
- Mobile Suit Gundam 00 the Movie: A Wakening of the Trailblazer (with Blue Water Studios) (Sunrise/Bandai Entertainment)
- Mobile Suit Gundam: Char's Counterattack (Sunrise/Bandai Entertainment)
- Mobile Suit Gundam SEED (Sunrise/Bandai Entertainment)
- Mobile Suit Gundam SEED Destiny (Sunrise/Bandai Entertainment)
- Mobile Suit Gundam Wing (Sunrise/Bandai Entertainment)
- Monkey Magic (Bandai Entertainment)
- Monster Rancher (Bohbot Entertainment)
- Nana (Viz Media → Sentai Filmworks)
- Night Warriors: Darkstalkers' Revenge (Viz Media)
- Ogre Slayer (Viz Media)
- Please Save My Earth (Viz Media)
- Popotan (Geneon)
- Powerpuff Girls Z (Turner Entertainment)
- Project A-ko 2: Plot of the Daitokuji Financial Group (Central Park Media)
- Project A-ko 3: Cinderella Rhapsody (Central Park Media)
- Project A-ko 4: FINAL (Central Park Media)
- Project A-ko: Grey Side/Blue Side (Central Park Media)
- Project ARMS (Viz Media)
- Ranma ½ (Viz Media)
- Ronin Warriors (Cinar/Bandai Entertainment)
- Saber Marionette J (Bandai Entertainment)
- Sanctuary (Viz Media)
- Shakugan no Shana (Season One: Geneon)
- Silent Mobius (Bandai Entertainment)
- Sinbad: A Flying Princess and a Secret Island (Nippon Animation)
- Sinbad: Night at High Noon and the Wonder Gate (Nippon Animation)
- Sinbad: The Magic Lamp and the Moving Islands (Nippon Animation)
- Smoking Behind the Supermarket with You
- The SoulTaker (Geneon)
- Sword of the Stranger (Bandai Entertainment)
- Star Ocean EX (Geneon)
- Starship Operators (Geneon)
- The Story of Saiunkoku (Geneon)
- Tenamonya Voyagers (Bandai Entertainment)
- Tetsujin 28 (Geneon)
- The New Adventures of Kimba The White Lion (Pioneer Home Entertainment)
- Tico and Friends (Cloverway Inc.)
- Trouble Chocolate (Viz Media)
- Tokyo Underground (Geneon)
- Ultimate Teacher (Central Park Media)
- Ultraviolet: Code 044 (Sony Pictures)
- Video Girl Ai (Viz Media)
- The Vision of Escaflowne (Sunrise/Bandai Entertainment)
- World Trigger (Toei Animation)
- Zoids: New Century (Viz Media)
- Zoids Wild (Allspark Animation)
- Z-Mind (Bandai Entertainment)

==== Video games ====
- Dynasty Warriors Gundam series (Bandai Namco Games)
- Gundam Battle Assault (Bandai Namco Games)
- Infinity Strash: Dragon Quest The Adventure of Dai (Square Enix)
- InuYasha: Feudal Combat (Bandai Namco Games)
- InuYasha: The Secret of the Cursed Mask (Bandai Namco Games)
- Kessen (Koei)
- Little Battlers eXperience (Level-5)
- Mega Man Battle Network 5: Double Team (Capcom)
- Mobile Suit Gundam: Federation vs. Zeon (Bandai Namco Games)
- Mobile Suit Gundam: Encounters in Space (Bandai Namco Games)
- Mobile Suit Gundam: Journey to Jaburo (Bandai Namco Games)
- Mobile Suit Gundam: Never Ending Tomorrow (Bandai Namco Games)
- Monkey Magic (Sunsoft)
- Zoids Wild: Blast Unleashed (Outright Games)

=== Blue Water Studios ===
These series were recorded at Blue Water Studios in Calgary and Edmonton, Alberta.

==== Western animation ====
- Benjamin Blumchen
- Bibi Blocksberg
- Cyboars (2011)
- Jungo
- Lalaloopsy
  - Lala-Oopsies: A Sew Magical Tale
  - Lalaloopsy Ponies: The Big Show
  - Lalaloopsy Babies: First Steps
  - Lalaloopsy: Festival of Sugary Sweets
  - Lalaloopsy: Band Together
- Micropolis (Wyvern Images)
- Pfffirates (Xilam)
- Ralf the Record Rat
- Peter Swift and the Little Circus
- Tomato Twins
- Troll Tales
- The Wheelers (Wyvern Images)
- Weebles

==== International animation ====
- The Haunted House (CJ E&M) (Tooniverse)
- Krazzy Planet (Animatzione Production)
- Keymon Ache (DQ Entertainment)
- Kongsuni and Friends (Young Toys)
- Metalions (Young Toys)
- Super 10 (Young Toys)
- Tobot: Daedo's Heroes (Young Toys)

==== Anime ====
- Angel Links (Bandai Entertainment)
- B-Daman Fireblast (Sunrights Inc.)
- Banner of the Stars (Bandai Entertainment)
- Betterman (Bandai Entertainment)
- Cardfight!! Vanguard (Bushiroad)
  - Cardfight!! Vanguard: Asia Circuit (Bushiroad)
  - Cardfight!! Vanguard: Link Joker (Bushiroad)
- Cardfight!! Vanguard G (Bushiroad)
  - Cardfight!! Vanguard G: GIRS Crisis (Bushiroad)
  - Cardfight!! Vanguard G: Stride Gate (Bushiroad)
  - Cardfight!! Vanguard G: NEXT (Bushiroad)
  - Cardfight!! Vanguard G: Z (Bushiroad)
- Cardfight!! Vanguard (2018) (Bushiroad)
  - Cardfight!! Vanguard: High School Arc Cont. (Bushiroad)
  - Cardfight!! Vanguard: Shinemon (Bushiroad)
- Cardfight!! Vanguard overDress (Bushiroad)
  - Cardfight!! Vanguard Will+Dress (Bushiroad)
  - Cardfight!! Vanguard DivineZ (Bushiroad)
- Ceres, Celestial Legend (Viz Media)
- Crest of the Stars (Bandai Entertainment)
- Deko Boko Friends (Viz Media)
- Deltora Quest (Dentsu)
- D.I.C.E. (Bandai Entertainment)
- Di Gi Charat Nyo! (Bandai Entertainment)
- Doki Doki School Hours (Geneon)
- Dragon Ball (Westwood Media)
- Dragon Ball GT (Westwood Media)
- Fancy Lala (Bandai Entertainment)
- Flame of Recca (Viz Media)
- Full Moon o Sagashite (Viz Media)
- Future Card Buddyfight (Bushiroad)
  - Future Card Buddyfight 100 (Bushiroad)
  - Future Card Buddyfight X (Bushiroad)
  - Future Card Buddyfight X All-Star Fight (Bushiroad)
- Future Card Buddyfight Ace (Bushiroad)
- Gregory Horror Show (Geneon)
- Hoop Days (Bandai Entertainment)
- Hunter x Hunter (Viz Media)
- Jubei-chan: The Ninja Girl (Bandai Entertainment)
- Jubei-chan 2 (Geneon)
- Kiznaiver (Crunchyroll)
- The Law of Ueki (Geneon)
- Little Battlers eXperience (Dentsu)
- My-Hime (Bandai Entertainment)
- My-Otome (Bandai Entertainment)
- Mobile Fighter G Gundam (Sunrise/Bandai Entertainment)
- Mobile Suit Zeta Gundam (Sunrise/Bandai Entertainment)
- Pretty Cure (Toei)
- Saber Marionette J to X (Bandai Entertainment)
- Scan2Go (Cookie Jar Entertainment)
- Strawberry Marshmallow (Geneon)
- Viper's Creed (Sony Pictures)
- Tide-Line Blue (Bandai Entertainment)
- World Trigger (Toei Animation)
- Zoids: Chaotic Century (Viz Media)

==== Video games ====
- Crimson Tears (Capcom)
- Dead Rivals (Gameloft)
- D.I.C.E. (Bandai Namco Games)
- Dynasty Warriors Gundam series (Bandai Namco Games)
- Gundam Battle Assault (Bandai Namco Games)
- Gregory Horror Show (Capcom)
- InuYasha: Feudal Combat (Bandai Namco Games)
- InuYasha: The Secret of the Cursed Mask (Bandai Namco Games)
- Little Battlers eXperience (Level-5)
- Mega Man: Powered Up (Capcom)
- Mega Man: Maverick Hunter X (Capcom)
- Mega Man X: Command Mission (Capcom)
- Mega Man X8 (Capcom)
- Mobile Suit Gundam: Federation vs. Zeon (Bandai Namco Games)
- Mobile Suit Gundam: Journey to Jaburo (Bandai Namco Games)
- Mobile Suit Gundam: Never Ending Tomorrow (Bandai Namco Games)
- Order & Chaos 2: Redemption (Gameloft)
- We Love Golf! (Capcom)

== See also ==
=== Similar studios ===
- Sentai Studios, Houston, Texas
- Bang Zoom!, Burbank, California
- Studiopolis, Los Angeles, California
- Sound Cadence Studios, Addison, Texas
- Studio Nano, Plano, Texas

=== General ===
- Playism
- vidby
- Deepl
