= Cardfight!! Vanguard: Link Joker =

- Season 3
- No. of episodes: 59

Release
- Original network: TV Tokyo
- Original release: January 13, 2013 – March 2, 2014

Series chronology
- ← Previous; Asia Circuit (season 2) Next → Legion Mate (season 4)

The third season of Cardfight!! Vanguard, titled Cardfight!! Vanguard: Link Joker (Japanese: カードファイト!! ヴァンガード リンクジョーカー編, Hepburn: Kādofaito!! Vangādo Rinku Jōkā Hen; lit. Cardfight!! Vanguard Link Joker Chapter), aired on Japanese television networks from January 13, 2013, to March 2, 2014, for a total of 59 episodes.

In July 2010, an anime television series based on the game was green-lit by TMS Entertainment under the directorial supervision of Hatsuki Tsuji. Music is composed by Takayuki Negishi while Mari Tominaga provided the character designs. The series began airing in Japan on TV Aichi beginning on January 8, 2011, and rebroadcast by AT-X, TV Tokyo, TV Osaka, and TV Setouchi systems. The media-streaming website Crunchyroll simulcasted the first season to the United States, Canada, the United Kingdom, and Ireland. Crunchyroll began streaming the second season to the United States, Canada, and the United Kingdom on June 30, 2012.

Twenty-five pieces of theme music are used for the series—nine opening themes and seventeen closing themes (one of which is exclusive to the English dub). The anime also features two insert songs performed by Ultra Rare (i.e. Suzuko Mimori, Yoshino Nanjō, and Aimi Terakawa, who are the original Japanese voice actresses of Kourin, Rekka, and Suiko). The two songs are "Miracle Trigger ~Tomorrow Will Be Ultra Rare!~" (ミラクルトリガー ~きっと明日はウルトラレア!~) (used in episodes 18, 26, and 115; simply known as "Miracle Trigger" in the English dub) and "Stand Up! DREAM" (スタンドアップ! DREAM) (used in episodes 39, 115, and 118).

An English dub co-produced by Ocean Productions (recorded at Blue Water Studios) began airing on Singapore's Okto channel from October 16, 2011, on Animax Asia from January 22, 2012, and on Malaysia's RTM-TV2 channel from November 18, 2012. Dubbed episodes also began being released on YouTube from May 29, 2012. The series can be seen legally on a dedicated channel for it created by Bushiroad, the original creators and manufacturers of the card game, and as of June 25 is available for viewing in most countries without geo-blocking.

While there are a few changes, the English dub adaption is mostly faithful to the original Japanese version. However, the most notable change in the English dub is that three opening themes and three ending themes are used. The only openings are English versions of the first opening theme "Vanguard" (from eps. 1–65), the third opening theme "Limit Break" (from eps. 66–104), and the fourth opening theme "Vanguard Fight" (from eps. 105 onward), all of which are still performed by their original respective artists.

The first ending theme used in the dub is an English version of the third ending theme "Dream Shooter" (from eps. 1–65) while the second ending theme is a unique song titled "Way To Victory" (from eps. 66–104), both of which are performed by Sea☆A. The ending credit sequence for this exclusive theme is the one used for the original sixth ending theme "Jōnetsu-ism". The third ending theme used in the dub is an English version of the original ninth ending song "Endless☆Fighter" (from eps. 105 onward), which is performed only by Aimi Terakawa in the dub. Similarly, the Ultra Rare insert songs are performed in English by Suzuko Mimori, Yoshino Nanjō, and Aimi Terakawa (the original Japanese voice actresses of Kourin, Rekka, and Suiko).

Individual episodes from seasons 1-4 are known as "Rides".

== Overview ==
The third season begins with Aichi's enrollment in high school at Miyaji Academy, where he tries to establish a Cardfight Club, despite the general student body's disinterest and the obstructions of the student council. Later, a new enemy appears in the form of Link Joker, which threatens to take over the world.

== Theme songs ==
Opening themes

- "Vanguard Fight" by Psychic Lover (eps. 105–128) (eps. 105–163 English dub)
- ""Mugen∞REBIRTH" (無限∞REBIRTH, Mugen∞RIBĀSU) by Daigo (eps. 129–148)
- "Break your spell" by Psychic Lover (eps. 149–163)

Ending themes

- "Endless☆Fighter" by Ultra Rare (Suzuko Mimori, Yoshino Nanjō, and Aimi Terakawa) (eps. 105–119) (eps. 105–163 English dub)
- "Yume Yume Express" by Milky Homes (Mimori, Kitta, Tokui, and Sasaki) (eps. 120–138)
- "Ride on fight!" by Misaki and Kourin (Kitta and Mimori) (eps. 139–150)
- "Fly away -To the Great Sky-" (Fly away -大空へ-, Fly away -Ōzora e-) by Suara (eps. 151–163)

== Episode list ==
No.	Title	Original release date
105	"Stand Up, It's High School!"; Transliteration: "Sutandoappu za Haisukūru!" (Japanese: スタンド・アップ・ザ・ハイスクール!)	January 13, 2013
106	"Catching a Break"; Transliteration: "Omae ni Bureiku" (Japanese: お前にブレイク)	January 20, 2013
107	"Targeted Idol"; Transliteration: "Nerawareta Aidoru" (Japanese: 狙われたアイドル)	January 27, 2013
108	"The Football Team's Assassin"; Transliteration: "Amefutobu no Shikaku" (Japanese: アメフト部の刺客)	February 3, 2013
109	"Birth of the Cardfight Club!"; Transliteration: "Tanjō!? Kādofaitobu" (Japanese: 誕生!?カードファイト部)	February 10, 2013
110	"First Match! Miyaji Academy vs. Hitsue High School"; Transliteration: "Hatsu Shiai! Miyaji Gakuen VS Hitsue Kōkō" (Japanese: 初試合！宮地学園VS後江高校)	February 17, 2013
111	"Reinforcements from the Junior High School!"; Transliteration: "Suketto wa Chūgakusei!" (Japanese: 助っとは中学生!)	February 24, 2013
112	"Kai's Shadow"; Transliteration: "Kai no Kage" (Japanese: 櫂の影)	March 3, 2013
113	"Who's the Vice-Captain?!"; Transliteration: "Fukubuchō wa Dare Da!?" (Japanese: 副部長はだれだ!?)	March 10, 2013
114	"Miyaji Academy, Middle School Division"; Transliteration: "Miyaji Gakuen Chūtōbu" (Japanese: 宮地学園中等部)	March 17, 2013
115	"Idol Fight"; Transliteration: "Aidoru Faito" (Japanese: アイドルファイト)	March 24, 2013
116	"Reunion with the Wind"; Transliteration: "Kaze to no Saikai" (Japanese: 風との再会)	March 31, 2013
117	"The Powerful Fukuhara High"; Transliteration: "Kyōgō Fukuhara Kōkō" (Japanese: 強豪 福原高校)	April 7, 2013
118	"Drama at the School Festival"; Transliteration: "Dokidoki no Bunkasai" (Japanese: ドキドキの文化祭)	April 14, 2013
119	"Legendary School Festival"; Transliteration: "Densetsu no Bunkasai" (Japanese: 伝説の文化祭)	April 21, 2013
120	"Hidden Fighting Spirit"; Transliteration: "Himetaru Tōshi" (Japanese: 秘めたる闘志)	April 28, 2013
121	"A Man's Willpower"; Transliteration: "Otoko no Iji" (Japanese: 男の意地)	May 5, 2013
122	"Naoki, the Challenger!"; Transliteration: "Charenjā Naoki" (Japanese: 挑戦者 ナオキ)	May 12, 2013
123	"Feelings About Victory"; Transliteration: "Shōri e no Omoi" (Japanese: 勝利への想い)	May 19, 2013
124	"Showdown at the Summit"; Transliteration: "Futari no Chōjō Kessen" (Japanese: 二人の頂上決戦)	May 26, 2013
125	"A Windy Day"; Transliteration: "Kaze no Tsuyoi Hi" (Japanese: 風の強い日)	June 2, 2013
126	"Mystery Dragon"; Transliteration: "Nazo no Doragon" (Japanese: 謎のドラゴン)	June 9, 2013
127	"Facing the "Lock""; Transliteration: "Rokku" (Japanese: 呪縛)	June 16, 2013
128	"Into the Reverse"; Transliteration: "Ribāsu" (Japanese: "Я" -リバース-)	June 23, 2013
129	"The Power of the Black Rings"; Transliteration: "Kokurin no Chikara" (Japanese: 黒輪の力)	June 30, 2013
130	"Dark Clouds Over Fukuhara High!"; Transliteration: "Anun Fukuhara Kōkō" (Japanese: 暗雲 福原高校)	July 7, 2013
131	"Eternal Marionette"; Transliteration: "Towa no Marionetto" (Japanese: 永遠の操り人形)	July 14, 2013
132	"The Last Dance"; Transliteration: "Rasuto Dansu" (Japanese: ラスト・ダンス)	July 21, 2013
133	"The Traitor General"; Transliteration: "Uragiri no Jeneraru" (Japanese: 裏切りの将軍)	July 28, 2013
134	"Kingmaker in the Moonlight"; Transliteration: "Gekka no Kingumēkā" (Japanese: 月下のキングメーカー)	August 4, 2013
135	"The Fall of Daiyusha"; Transliteration: "Daiyūsha Otsu" (Japanese: ダイユーシャ堕つ)	August 11, 2013
136	"Yuri's Pendant"; Transliteration: "Yuri no Kunshō" (Japanese: ユリの勲章)	August 18, 2013
137	"Dark Dimensional Combination! "Яeverse" Daiyusha"; Transliteration: "Ankoku Jigen Gattai! Ribāsu Daiyūsha" (Japanese: 暗黒次元合体! "Я" ダイユーシャ)	August 25, 2013
138	"The Depth of Our Bond"; Transliteration: "Kizuna no Fune" (Japanese: 絆の舟)	September 1, 2013
139	"School Camping Trip"; Transliteration: "Rinkan Gakkō" (Japanese: 林間学校)	September 8, 2013
140	"Under the Starry Sky"; Transliteration: "Hoshizora no Shita de..." (Japanese: 星空の下で...)	September 15, 2013
141	"Pirate Flag over Miyaji"; Transliteration: "Miyaji ni Hatameku Kaizoku Hata" (Japanese: 宮地にはためく海賊旗)	September 22, 2013
142	"Kamui's Fists"; Transliteration: "Kamui no Kobushi" (Japanese: カムイの拳)	September 29, 2013
143	"The Ninja Master Returns"; Transliteration: "Ninja Masuta Fukkatsu" (Japanese: ニンジャマスター復活)	October 6, 2013
144	"Rampaging Angel, Rekka!"; Transliteration: "Bōsō Enjeru Rekka" (Japanese: 暴走天使レッカ)	October 13, 2013
145	"Friends"; Transliteration: "Tomodachi" (Japanese: トモダチ)	October 20, 2013
146	"Countdown to Despair"; Transliteration: "Zetsubō e no Kauntodaun" (Japanese: 絶望へのカウントダウン)	October 27, 2013
147	"Chaotic Destroyer"; Transliteration: "Konton no Hakaisha" (Japanese: 混沌の破壊者)	November 3, 2013
148	"The Power Within"; Transliteration: "Sorezore no Ketsui" (Japanese: それぞれの決意)	November 10, 2013
149	"Recapturing Miyaji Academy!"; Transliteration: "Dakkan Seyo!! Miyaji Gakuen" (Japanese: 奪還せよ!! 宮地学園)	November 17, 2013
150	"Total Annihilation!"; Transliteration: "Subete wo Buchiyabure!!" (Japanese: すべてをブチ破れ!!)	November 24, 2013
151	"Aichi and Kamui"; Transliteration: "Aichi to Kamui" (Japanese: アイチとカムイ)	December 1, 2013
152	"The True Form of Friendship"; Transliteration: "Yūjō no Katachi" (Japanese: 友情の形)	December 8, 2013
153	"The Two Leaders"; Transliteration: "Futari no Sendōsha" (Japanese: 二人の先導者)	December 15, 2013
154	"Beyond the Bond"; Transliteration: "Kizuna no Saki ni" (Japanese: 絆の先に)	December 22, 2013
155	"The Two Leons"; Transliteration: "Futari no Reon" (Japanese: 二人のレオン)	December 29, 2013
156	"Breaking the Chains"; Transliteration: "Kusari Tatsumono" (Japanese: 鎖裁つ者)	January 12, 2014
157	"Kourin"; Transliteration: "Kōrin" (Japanese: コーリン)	January 19, 2014
158	"Ren's Wish"; Transliteration: "Ren no Nozomi" (Japanese: レンの望み)	January 26, 2014
159	"Dragon Reborn"; Transliteration: "Saitan no Ryū" (Japanese: 再誕の龍)	February 2, 2014
160	"Perfect Black Ring"; Transliteration: "Kanzen'narishi Kokurin" (Japanese: 完全なりし黒輪)	February 9, 2014
161	"The World's End"; Transliteration: "Wārudo Endo" (Japanese: ワールドエンド)	February 16, 2014
162	"The Intersecting Path"; Transliteration: "Majiwaru Michi" (Japanese: 交わる道)	February 23, 2014
163	"The Connected"; Transliteration: "Tsunagu Mono" (Japanese: 繋ぐもの)	March 2, 2014
