= Ishida & Asakura =

Japanese manga series

- Cover of the first manga volume

石田とあさくら (Ishida to Asakura)
- Genre: Comedy
- Manga
- Written by: Masao
- Published by: Shōnen Gahōsha
- Magazine: Young King
- Original run: 2011 – July 19, 2012
- Volumes: 2
- Anime television series
- Directed by: Pippuya
- Studio: Dax Production, Hotline
- Licensed by: NA: Crunchyroll (expired); NA: Ascendent Animation
- Original network: Tokyo MX
- Original run: January 6, 2013 – March 24, 2013
- Episodes: 12

Ishida & Asakura (石田とあさくら, Ishida to Asakura) is a Japanese comedy manga series written and illustrated by Masao. It was adapted into an anime television series in 2013.

Ascendent Animation produced an English dub of the anime.

== Plot ==
Ishida & Asakura focuses on the title characters—the stoic Ishida and the lecherous Asakura—and the bizarre students and teachers that populate their high school. Asakura is obsessed with curvaceous women and dreams of becoming a teacher in order to be surrounded by attractive girls all day. Ishida dreams of running a flower shop together with Asakura after they finish high school, and appears to have strong homosexual feelings for his best friend, although this is always played for laughs.

== Characters ==
Yoshio Asakura (あさくら)
Voiced by: Nobuhisa Nakamoto (Japanese); Cole Feuchter (English)
He is the main character of the story, a high school student who dreams of becoming a teacher. However, his motives are far from pure, as Asakura is obsessed with breasts and wishes to become a teacher so he can constantly be surrounded by attractive female students. Asakura has an afro and speaks with a slight stutter. In class, there is constant competition for Asakura's attention between his best friend Ishida and fellow student Yamada.
Mitsunori Ishida (石田)
Voiced by: Shuta Morishima (Japanese); Joshua Waters (English)
Asakura's best friend is a tall and stoic young man who speaks in a strong, serious tone. He dreams of opening a flower shop with Asakura after they graduate high school, and reacts violently whenever Yamada tries to get Asakura's attention. Because of his constant blushing whenever he speaks to Asakura, it is assumed that he has homosexual feelings for his best friend.
Mamoru Yamada (山田)
Voiced by: Tooru Sakurai (Japanese); Steve Warky Nunez (English)
Yamada is a classmate of Ishida and Asakura, with the appearance of a stereotypical nerd, wearing thick glasses and having prominent buck-teeth. Yamada dreams of opening a bookstore with Asakura, but Ishida violently "kills" him in a slapstick fashion every time the subject is brought up; Yamada will always appear unharmed in the next episode. He is a mechanical genius and once built a robot version of himself to fight Ishida.

== Media ==
=== Anime ===
An anime television series, directed by Pippuya and produced by Dax Production and Hotline, started airing on January 6, 2013, until March 24, 2013, running for a total of 12 episodes. The series had been licensed for simulcast streaming on Crunchyroll. The opening theme is "Doki Doki Doku" by Rayli. The anime was released on DVD on July 13, 2021, by Ascendant Animation.

==== Episode list ====
No.	Title	Directed by	Original release date
1	"The Introduction of Asakura"; Transliteration: "Shōkai no Asakura" (Japanese: あさくらと将来)	Kiba Walker (English Version)	January 6, 2013
Asakura is a high school student who is focused on one thing. Boobs. Everyone else seems to be focused on him though.
2	"The Training of Asakura"; Transliteration: "Torēningu no Asakura" (Japanese: あさくらと特訓)	Kiba Walker (English Version)	January 13, 2013
When Asakura's test results come back, his graduation is thrown into question. Ishida decides to help Asakura by becoming his trainer.
3	"The Trunk Incident"; Transliteration: "Torankuinshidento" (Japanese: あさくらとゾウさん)	Kiba Walker (English Version)	January 20, 2013
After holding it in for too long, the boys need to relieve themselves, but they're surprised by an unexpected visitor.
4	"The Old Friend Fraud"; Transliteration: "Denwa to Asakura" (Japanese: あさくらと電話)	Kiba Walker (English Version)	January 27, 2013
Asakura becomes worried about the money required for their shop. Meanwhile, some of the crew start getting scamming phone calls.
5	"The Passion of Yamaguchi-sensei"; Transliteration: "Junan no Yamaguchi-sensei" (Japanese: 山口先生の情熱)	Kiba Walker (English Version)	February 3, 2013
The class has a new teacher and he can't WAIT to teach everyone new things. However, with students like these, will he be successful?
6	"Nanako and Asakura"; Transliteration: "Nanako to Asakura" (Japanese: 奈々子とあさくら)	Kiba Walker (English Version)	February 10, 2013
Asakura saves Nanako from a bad accident. After such an experience, are these two falling in love?
7	"Ishida and Iron Yamada"; Transliteration: "Ishida to Aian Yamada" (Japanese: 石田とアイアン山田)	Kiba Walker (English Version)	February 17, 2013
Yamada creates a robot to get rid of his arch-nemesis, but sometimes things don't work out as intended.
8	"Alice and Asakura"; Transliteration: "Alice to Asakura" (Japanese: アリスとあさくら)	Kiba Walker (English Version)	February 24, 2013
Ishida needs 10 million yen to open his flower shop, so he decides to get a job at a particular cafe.
9	"Yamada and Alice"; Transliteration: "Yamada to Alice" (Japanese: 山田とアリス)	Kiba Walker (English Version)	March 3, 2013
Yamada has a crush on the new maid, Alice. When he finds out that Ishida has been to the shop, Yamada decides to defend his honor and his crush.
10	"Brother and Sister"; Transliteration: "Ani to Imōto" (Japanese: 兄と妹)	Kiba Walker (English Version)	March 10, 2013
Yamada is murdered on the way to school. His sister investigates and seeks revenge.
11	"Ishida and Smiling"; Transliteration: "Ishida to Egao" (Japanese: 石田とスマイル)	Kiba Walker (English Version)	March 17, 2013
Ishida discovers that in order to run a shop, one must be able to smile. His classmates decide to help before it's too late.
12	"Ishida and Asakura"; Transliteration: "Ishida to Asakura" (Japanese: 石田とあさくら)	Kiba Walker (English Version)	March 24, 2013
Ishida stays true to his promise for Asakura. Will they not only save their friendship, but the world?
