= Tasūketsu: Fate of the Majority =

Japanese manga series

- First tankōbon volume cover

多数欠 (Tasūketsu)
- Genre: Suspense
- Manga
- Written by: Taiga Miyakawa
- Published by: Comic Smart (digital); Micro Magazine (print)
- Imprint: Micro Magazine Comics
- Magazine: Ganma!
- Original run: September 11, 2013 – present List of titles: Part 1 September 11, 2013 – November 28, 2014; Part 2 April 30, 2015 – November 10, 2017; Part 3 November 17, 2017 – November 4, 2022; Part 4 December 29, 2023 – present
- Volumes: 6
- Original video animation

Tasūketsu: Judgement Assizes
- Directed by: Rabbit Machine
- Studio: Imagica Lab
- Released: January 29, 2021
- Runtime: 7 minutes
- Anime television series
- Directed by: Tatsuo Sato
- Written by: Tatsuo Sato
- Music by: R.O.N
- Studio: Satelight
- Licensed by: Crunchyroll
- Original network: Nippon TV, BS NTV, RAB, AT-X
- Original run: July 3, 2024 – December 25, 2024
- Episodes: 24
- icon

Tasūketsu: Fate of the Majority (多数欠, Tasūketsu; lit. "Missing Majority") is a Japanese manga series written and illustrated by Taiga Miyakawa. It began serialization online on Comic Smart's Ganma! website in September 2013 and consists of four parts. As of December 2020, Micro Magazine has released six volumes. A 7-minute original video animation (OVA) adaptation, titled Tasūketsu: Judgement Assizes and produced by Imagica Lab, was released in January 2021. An anime television series adaptation produced by Satelight aired from July to December 2024.

== Characters ==
Saneatsu Narita (成田 実篤, Narita Saneatsu)
Voiced by: Masatomo Nakazawa (OVA), Yūto Uemura (TV series)
The main male protagonist. High school student, 15 years old. His mother died in a car accident when he was very young, and he receives monthly living expenses from his father.
Saaya Fujishiro (藤代 紗綾, Fujishiro Saaya)
Voiced by: Anna Nagase (TV series)
The main female protagonist. High school student, 15 years old. She is a member of the student council.
Ryūta Ichinose (一之瀬 龍太, Ichinose Ryūta)
Voiced by: Kazuki Ura (TV series)
High school student, 15 years old. Saneatsu's best friend.
Kazuhiko Satō (佐藤 一彦, Satō Kazuhiko)
Voiced by: Kazuki Ura (OVA), Kōki Ōsuzu (TV series)
High school student, 16 years old. Nicknamed Ippiko (いっぴこ).
Omi Jin (神 臣, Jin Omi)
Voiced by: Yuki Shirato (OVA), Shiori Mikami (TV series)
High school student, 15 years old. Often mistaken for an elementary-schooler due to his height.
Eren Kunashiri (国後 依恋, Kunashiri Eren)
Voiced by: Yuki Nakashima (TV series)
High school student, 16 years old.
Tōjūrō Yagihashi (八木橋 藤十郎, Yagihashi Tōjūrō)
Voiced by: Tomotaka Harada (OVA), Daisuke Ono (TV series)
High school student, 18 years old.
Ryōhei Sudō (須藤 良平, Sudō Ryōhei)
Voiced by: Kazunori Nomiya (OVA), Jun Kasama (TV series)
Sōtarō Shinozaki (篠崎 宗太郎, Shinozaki Sōtarō)
Voiced by: Shuta Morishima (TV series)
High school teacher, 27 years old.
Ren Iruga (入賀 煉, Iruga Ren)
Voiced by: KENN (TV series)
Hisoka Midō (御堂 密, Midō Hisoka)
Voiced by: Kenjiro Tsuda (TV series)
The Emperor (皇帝, Kōtei)
Voiced by: Yuka Terasaki (TV series)
The leader of the game Tasuketsu.
Bōrinmaru Gokokuhōtenji (護国鳳天寺 暴麟丸, Gokokuhōtenji Bōrinmaru)
Voiced by: Kotomi Aihara (TV series)
Middle-schooler, 13 years old. Nicknamed "Gobō" due to the difficulty in pronouncing his name.
Rika Suzuki (鈴木 理科, Suzuki Rika)
Voiced by: Shiki Aoki (TV series)
Former delinquent, 17 years old. She was expelled from high school for bad behavior. Smokes very heavily in the manga, but this is cut from the anime.
Hayato Sōma (相馬 隼人, Sōma Hayato)
Voiced by: Kentarō Kumagai (TV series)
Raion Ōno (王野 頼音, Ōno Raion)
Voiced by: Yuki Kaji (OVA), Toshiki Kumagai (TV series)
Shūji Nihonyanagi (二本柳 周示, Nihon'yanagi Shūji)
Voiced by: Satoshi Niwa (TV series)
Hikari Ebina (蛯名 光, Ebina Hikaru)
Voiced by: Sayumi Suzushiro (TV series)
Kō Kirishima (霧島 輝, Kirishima Kō)
Voiced by: Kaito Ishikawa (TV series)
Kai Kasai (葛西 甲斐, Kasai Kai)
Voiced by: Noeru Kawashima (TV series)
Seraphiel (セラフィエル, Serafieru)
Voiced by: Yusuke Shirai (TV series)
Maria Kisaragi (如月 麻里亜, Kisaragi Maria)
Voiced by: Yoko Hikasa (TV series)
Kotetsu Tsugawa (津川 虎徹, Tsugawa Kotetsu)
Voiced by: Taku Yashiro (OVA)
Haruto Yanagi (柳陽 翔, Yanagi Haruto)
Voiced by: Ayumu Murase (OVA)
Kanato Sakurai
Voiced by: Daisuke Motohashi (OVA)

== Media ==
=== Manga ===
No.	Release date	ISBN
1	January 30, 2015	978-4-8963-7492-6
2	June 17, 2015	978-4-8963-7512-1
3	February 29, 2016	978-4-8963-7685-2
4	August 31, 2017	978-4-8963-7686-9
5	August 30, 2019	978-4-8963-7914-3
6	December 18, 2020	978-4-8671-6093-0

=== Anime ===
A 7-minute original video animation (OVA) adaptation titled Tasūketsu: Judgement Assizes, created through a crowdfunding campaign and directed by Rabbit Machine at Imagica Lab, was released on January 29, 2021. The OVA's theme song is "Jesus Knows" performed by Exina.

An anime television series adaptation was announced in January 2024. It is produced by Satelight, and directed and written by Tatsuo Sato, with Tōru Hamazaki serving as assistant director, Nami Hayashi designing the characters, and R.O.N composing the music. The series aired from July 2 to December 25, 2024, on Nippon TV's AnichU programming block and other networks. (Note: Nippon TV lists the series premiere on July 2, 2024, at 25:59, which is effectively July 3 at 1:59 a.m. JST.) For the first cour, the opening theme song is "Emperor Time", performed by Vivarush, while the ending theme song is "Game Over", performed by Issey. For the second cour, the opening theme song is "Fly Higher", performed by Travis Japan, while the ending theme song is "Reasons", performed by Aina Aiba. Crunchyroll streamed the series.

==== Episodes ====
No.	Title	Directed by (Note: Production staff information is taken from the ending credits of each episode.)	Written by	Storyboarded by	Original release date
1	"Tomorrow"; Transliteration: "Ashita" (Japanese: 明日)	Tōru Hamazaki	Tatsuo Sato	Tatsuo Sato	July 3, 2024
2	"Good Intentions"; Transliteration: "Zeni" (Japanese: 善意)	Yasuyuki Fuse	Tatsuo Sato	Noriaki Saito	July 10, 2024
3	"Motion"; Transliteration: "Dō" (Japanese: 動)	So Toyama	Tatsuo Sato	So Toyama	July 17, 2024
4	"Transition"; Transliteration: "Ten" (Japanese: 転)	Sokuza Makoto	Mitsutaka Hirota	Takeshi Mori	July 24, 2024
5	"Nearby"; Transliteration: "Hata" (Japanese: 傍)	Kōsuke Shimotori	Toshizo Nemoto	Tōru Hamazaki	August 14, 2024
6	"Assemble"; Transliteration: "Shūketsu" (Japanese: 集結)	Yasuyuki Fuse	Mariko Mochizuki	Teppei Taketani	August 21, 2024
7	"Pass Down"; Transliteration: "Tsunagi" (Japanese: 繋)	Tsuyoshi Yoshimoto	Mitsutaka Hirota	Takeshi Mori	August 28, 2024
8	"Operation"; Transliteration: "Sakusen" (Japanese: 作戦)	Hideki Tonokatsu	Toshizo Nemoto	Takeshi Mori	September 4, 2024
9	"Emperor"; Transliteration: "Kōtei" (Japanese: 皇帝)	Toru Hamasaki	Toshizo Nemoto	Takeshi Mori	September 11, 2024
10	"Closing"; Transliteration: "Yui" (Japanese: 結)	Yasuyuki Fuse	Tatsuo Sato	Chihiro Kumano	September 18, 2024
11	"Foreboding"; Transliteration: "Taidō" (Japanese: 胎動)	Makoto Noriza	Tatsuo Sato	Toru Hamasaki	September 25, 2024
12	"The Key"; Transliteration: "Yō" (Japanese: 要)	Kosuke Shimoshima	Mitsuki Hirota	Noriaki Saito	October 2, 2024
13	"Shock"; Transliteration: "Shōgeki" (Japanese: 衝撃)	Hideki Tonokatsu	Mitsuki Hirota	Chihiro Kumano	October 9, 2024
14	"The Lie"; Transliteration: "Uso" (Japanese: 嘘)	Yasuyuki Fuse	Toshizo Nemoto	Mori Takeshi	October 16, 2024
15	"Interrogation"; Transliteration: "Jinmon" (Japanese: 尋問)	Kusa Toyama	Mariko Mochizuki	Mori Takeshi	October 23, 2024
16	"Team"; Transliteration: "Nakama" (Japanese: 仲間)	Hideki Tonokatsu	Mariko Mochizuki	Noriaki Saito	October 30, 2024
17	"The Scenario"; Transliteration: "Shinario" (Japanese: シナリオ)	Kosuke Shimoshima	Toshizo Nemoto	Chihiro Kumano	November 6, 2024
18	"Covertness"; Transliteration: "Anyaku" (Japanese: 暗躍)	Yasuyuki Fuse	Mitsuki Hirota	Mori Takeshi	November 13, 2024
19	"Innocence"; Transliteration: "Mujaki" (Japanese: 無邪気)	Takeshi Yoshimoto	Mariko Mochizuki	Mori Takeshi	November 20, 2024
20	"Loyalty"; Transliteration: "Chūsei" (Japanese: 忠誠)	Toru Hamasaki	Mitsuki Hirota	Mori Takeshi	November 27, 2024
21	"Either Fate, or a Miracle"; Transliteration: "Unmei, Aruiwa Kiseki" (Japanese: 運命, あるいは奇跡)	Kosuke Shimoshima	Toshizo Nemoto	Noriaki Saito	December 4, 2024
22	"The Battlefront"; Transliteration: "Tokkō Sensen" (Japanese: 特攻戦線)	Yasuyuki Fuse	Toshizo Nemoto	Chihiro Kumano	December 11, 2024
23	"Showdown"; Transliteration: "Kessen" (Japanese: 決戦)	Toru Hamasaki	Mariko Mochizuki	Mori Takeshi	December 18, 2024
24	"Towards the Light"; Transliteration: "Hikari no Sasu Kata e To" (Japanese: 光の指す方へと)	Sō Toyama	Tatsuo Sato	Sō Toyama, Tatsuo Sato	December 25, 2024

== Reception ==
The series ranked second on AnimeJapan's "Most Wanted Anime Adaptation" poll in 2019; it ranked seventh on the same poll in the following year.
