= Cardfight!! Vanguard: Asia Circuit =

- Season 2
- No. of episodes: 39

Release
- Original network: TV Tokyo, TV Aichi, AT-X
- Original release: April 8, 2012 – January 1, 2013

Series chronology
- ← Previous; Cardfight!! Vanguard (season 1) Next → Link Joker (season 3)

The second season of Cardfight!! Vanguard, titled Cardfight!! Vanguard: Asia Circuit (Japanese: カードファイト!! ヴァンガード アジアサーキット編, Hepburn: Kādofaito!! Vangādo Ajia Sākito Hen; lit. Cardfight!! Vanguard Asia Circuit Chapter), was broadcast on TV Tokyo and other stations from April 8, 2012, to January 1, 2013, for a total of 39 episodes.

In July 2010, an anime television series based on the game was green-lit by TMS Entertainment under the directorial supervision of Hatsuki Tsuji. Music is composed by Takayuki Negishi while Mari Tominaga provided the character designs. The series began airing in Japan on TV Aichi beginning on January 8, 2011, and rebroadcast by AT-X, TV Tokyo, TV Osaka, and TV Setouchi systems. The media-streaming website Crunchyroll simulcasted the first season to the United States, Canada, the United Kingdom, and Ireland. Crunchyroll began streaming the second season to the United States, Canada, and the United Kingdom on June 30, 2012.

Twenty-five pieces of theme music are used for the series—nine opening themes and seventeen closing themes (one of which is exclusive to the English dub). The anime also features two insert songs performed by Ultra Rare (i.e. Suzuko Mimori, Yoshino Nanjō, and Aimi Terakawa, who are the original Japanese voice actresses of Kourin, Rekka, and Suiko). The two songs are "Miracle Trigger ~Tomorrow Will Be Ultra Rare!~" (ミラクルトリガー ~きっと明日はウルトラレア!~) (used in episodes 18, 26, and 115; simply known as "Miracle Trigger" in the English dub) and "Stand Up! DREAM" (スタンドアップ! DREAM) (used in episodes 39, 115, and 118).

An English dub co-produced by Ocean Productions (recorded at Blue Water Studios) began airing on Singapore's Okto channel from October 16, 2011, on Animax Asia from January 22, 2012, and on Malaysia's RTM-TV2 channel from November 18, 2012. Dubbed episodes also began being released on YouTube from May 29, 2012. The series can be seen legally on a dedicated channel for it created by Bushiroad, the original creators and manufacturers of the card game, and as of June 25 is available for viewing in most countries without geo-blocking.

While there are a few changes, the English dub adaption is mostly faithful to the original Japanese version. However, the most notable change in the English dub is that three opening themes and three ending themes are used. The only openings are English versions of the first opening theme "Vanguard" (from eps. 1–65), the third opening theme "Limit Break" (from eps. 66–104), and the fourth opening theme "Vanguard Fight" (from eps. 105 onward), all of which are still performed by their original respective artists.

The first ending theme used in the dub is an English version of the third ending theme "Dream Shooter" (from eps. 1–65) while the second ending theme is a unique song titled "Way To Victory" (from eps. 66–104), both of which are performed by Sea☆A. The ending credit sequence for this exclusive theme is the one used for the original sixth ending theme "Jōnetsu-ism". The third ending theme used in the dub is an English version of the original ninth ending song "Endless☆Fighter" (from eps. 105 onward), which is performed only by Aimi Terakawa in the dub. Similarly, the Ultra Rare insert songs are performed in English by Suzuko Mimori, Yoshino Nanjō, and Aimi Terakawa (the original Japanese voice actresses of Kourin, Rekka, and Suiko).

Individual episodes from seasons 1-4 are known as "Rides".

== Overview ==
In the second season of the anime, Aichi discovers that the clans of Royal Paladin, Kagero, and Shadow Paladin have mysteriously disappeared from everyone's memory. While Team Q4 travels around Asia to compete in the VF Circuit tournament, Aichi searches for answers, eventually discovering a dark power that could threaten the fate of the world.

== Theme songs ==
Opening theme

- "Limit Break" by JAM Project (eps. 66–104)

Ending themes

- "Jōnetsu-ism" (情熱イズム, "Jōnetsu-izumu") by Rin (eps. 66–78)
- "Fighting Growing Diary" by Natsuko Aso (eps. 79–91)
- "Entry!" (エントリー！, "Entori!") by Sea☆A (eps. 92–104)

English dub ending theme

- "Way To Victory" by Sea☆A (eps. 66–104)

== Episode list ==
No. overall	No. in season	Title	Original release date
66	1	"Gold Paladin"; Transliteration: "Gōrudo Paradin" (Japanese: 金色の騎士団)	April 8, 2012
67	2	"Activate! Limit Break!"; Transliteration: "Hatsudō! Rimitto Bureiku!!" (Japanese: 発動! リミットブレイク!!)	April 15, 2012
68	3	"Team Q4 Once More"; Transliteration: "Chīmu Q4 Futatabi" (Japanese: チームQ4再び)	April 22, 2012
69	4	"A Challenge from PSY"; Transliteration: "PSY kara no Chōsen-jō" (Japanese: PSYからの挑戦状)	April 29, 2012
70	5	"Let It Begin! The VF Circuit!"; Transliteration: "Kaimaku! VF Sākitto!!" (Japanese: 開幕! VFサーキット!!)	May 6, 2012
71	6	"Enter Team Ninja"; Transliteration: "Sanjō! Chīmu Shinobu" (Japanese: 参上! チーム忍)	May 13, 2012
72	7	"The Lion That Surpasses The Limit"; Transliteration: "Genkai o Koeru Shishi" (Japanese: 限界を超える獅子)	May 20, 2012
73	8	"Fortune Telling Cardfight!"; Transliteration: "Uranai Faito!" (Japanese: 占いファイト!)	May 27, 2012
74	9	"Dream Girl Dilemma!"; Transliteration: "Megami o Kakete!" (Japanese: 女神を賭けて!)	June 3, 2012
75	10	"Pride of the Elite"; Transliteration: "Erīto no Kokori" (Japanese: エリートの誇り)	June 10, 2012
76	11	"The Advent of a Genius"; Transliteration: "Tensai Kōrin" (Japanese: 天才降臨)	June 17, 2012
77	12	"Challenger at the Snow Fields"; Transliteration: "Setsugen no Chōsen-sha" (Japanese: 雪原の挑戦者)	June 24, 2012
78	13	"A Visit from Tetsu"; Transliteration: "Tetsu Genru" (Japanese: テツ現る)	July 1, 2012
79	14	"Excitement at the Seoul Stage!"; Transliteration: "Nekkyō-tekina no Sourusutēji" (Japanese: 熱狂的なのソウルステージ)	July 8, 2012
80	15	"The Startling New Member"; Transliteration: "Kyōgaku no Shin Menbā" (Japanese: 驚愕の新メンバー)	July 15, 2012
81	16	"Rematch of the Knights"; Transliteration: "Kishitachi no Saisen" (Japanese: 騎士たちの再戦)	July 22, 2012
82	17	"Challenge of a Hero"; Transliteration: "Eiyū no Chōsen" (Japanese: 英雄の挑戦)	July 29, 2012
83	18	"The Legendary Fighter"; Transliteration: "Densetsu no Faitā" (Japanese: 伝説のファイター)	August 5, 2012
84	19	"An Invitation to Everlasting Summer"; Transliteration: "Tō Natsu e no Jōtaijō" (Japanese: 遠夏 への招待状)	August 12, 2012
85	20	"Our Respective Summers"; Transliteration: "Sorezore no Natsu" (Japanese: それぞれの夏)	August 19, 2012
86	21	"Handsome Fight! Mitsusada vs. Gouki / Handsome Fight! Koutei vs. Gouki"; Transliteration: "Otokomae Faito! Mitsusada VS Gouki" (Japanese: 男前ファイト! 光定VSゴウキ)	August 26, 2012
87	22	"Passion! The Hong Kong Stage"; Transliteration: "Moeyo! Honkon Sutēji" (Japanese: 燃えよ! 香港ステージ)	September 2, 2012
88	23	"Power of the Tag Fight!"; Transliteration: "Saikyō! Taggufaito" (Japanese: 最強! タッグファイト)	September 9, 2012
89	24	"The Weed Soul!! / The Entangling Weeds!"; Transliteration: "Zassō Tamashī!!" (Japanese: The•草•魂!!)	September 16, 2012
90	25	"All Hands on Deck! The Legendary Fleet"; Transliteration: "Shutsugeki! Densetsu no Kantai" (Japanese: 出撃! 伝説の艦隊)	September 23, 2012
91	26	"Blue Storm Dragon, Maelstrom"; Transliteration: "Sōran Ryū Meirusutorōmu" (Japanese: 蒼嵐竜 メイルストローム)	September 30, 2012
92	27	"Q4 vs. Ultra Rare"; Transliteration: "Q4 VS Urutorarea" (Japanese: Q4 VS ウルトラレア)	October 7, 2012
93	28	"The Angels' Dance"; Transliteration: "Tenshi-tachi no Mai" (Japanese: 天使たちの舞い)	October 14, 2012
94	29	"A Gathering of Winners"; Transliteration: "Tsudoishi Shōsha-tachi" (Japanese: 集いし勝者たち)	October 21, 2012
95	30	"Assemble! Japan Stage"; Transliteration: "Jūketsu! Nihon Sutēji" (Japanese: 集結! 日本ステージ)	October 28, 2012
96	31	"Decisive Battle! Bridal Fight"; Transliteration: "Kessen! Buraidarufaito" (Japanese: 決戦! ブライダルファイト)	November 4, 2012
97	32	"The King's Challenge"; Transliteration: "Ō kara no Chōsen-jō" (Japanese: 王からの挑戦状)	November 11, 2012
98	33	"A New Shine!"; Transliteration: "Aratanaru Kagayaki!" (Japanese: 新たなる輝き!)	November 18, 2012
99	34	"The Truth of the Wind"; Transliteration: "Kaze no Shinjitsu" (Japanese: 風の真実)	November 25, 2012
100	35	"The Blazing Lion"; Transliteration: "Kōki no Shishi" (Japanese: 光輝の獅子)	December 2, 2012
101	36	"Leon Soryu"; Transliteration: "Sōryū Reon" (Japanese: 蒼龍レオン)	December 9, 2012
102	37	"The Wind's Judgment"; Transliteration: "Kaze no Shinpan" (Japanese: 風の審判)	December 16, 2012
103	38	"Light and Nothingness"; Transliteration: "Hikari to Kyomu" (Japanese: 光と虚無)	December 23, 2012
104	39	"Where the Wind Blows"; Transliteration: "Kaze no Yukue" (Japanese: 風のゆくえ)	January 2, 2013
