= Cyboars =

Animated web series

The logo of Cyboars

Cyboars is an animated web series, produced by Cyboars International, LLC. and debuting in late December 2011. The creative team consists of Walter McDaniel as designer/art director, Wes Takashi as producer, Ian Powers as action director, Rick Hoberg as storyboard director, Sheldon Arnst as animation director, James Felder as writer/story editor, Jake Black as writer, and Cedrick Chan as overseas lighting director.

== History ==
The franchise was created by Olive Branch, Mississippi brothers Ken and Kirk Smith, initially published as a single issue comic book by Vintage Comics in 1996. A toyline from Imaginary Limitz came out in 1997, which included action figures of the main cast. It was intended to be supported by a CGI animated series, co-produced by Imaginary Limitz and Funimation. A 24-minute pilot aired in syndication in late 1997 featuring animation by Pentafour Software, voice work from The Ocean Group, and a theme song by Brave Combo.

In 2009, the brothers created Cyboars International in the hopes of rebooting the property. In late 2011, a five-episode CGI animated mini-series launched on Kabillion and was later made available on Toon Goggles. The show was co-produced by Black Dragon Entertainment and Evergreen Entertainment, with animation by Dicon Soft and voice work recorded by Blue Water Studios. It was intended to be followed by a further 26 episodes. A video game for iOS devices launched in October 2012.

== Premise ==
Formerly known as the Wylde Pack, the Cyboars are pig-like aliens from the planet Stygor who rebelled against the Bytrons, a bull-like race who conquered their world. The Cyboars crashed on Earth and, barely alive, were outfitted with robotic body parts by human scientist Dr. Genetti. Now they must rebuild their ship, the Dirty Digger, while simultaneously fighting against the Renegades, criminal minions of the Bytrons who have been similarly augmented into Bionic Bulls by the evil Stagorex, armor-clad android overlord of the organization STAG.

=== Characters ===
- Bushar, also known by the codename "Bush Hog", is an expert in battle strategy and is the leader of the Cyboars since back when they were called the Wylde Pack. His weapons include the Battle Bandolier, a bandolier containing slime slicks, blinding flare mines, and stink bombs. He also has the Mud Guns, mud-shooting pistols.
- Ardonna, also known by the codename "Sparky" (short for "Sparkatronic Cerebrial-Cortextual Interfacer"), is a scientist and is described as being "smart and sassy". She has "cyboarnetics" that let her hack into any machine. As a female, she lacks the tusks of the other Cyboars.
- Sen Sunar, also known by the codename "Old Fang", is a martial arts master who is the oldest and wisest of the Cyboars. Using his concentration and a sword made from the tusk of a Stygorian dinosaur, he can summon an energy ghost of the ancient beast which obeys his commands.
- Sten-Kai, also known by the codename "Stampede", is described as being the headstrong "wildboar" member of the Cyboars and also as being "wisecracking but not wise". His powers include "cyboarnetic<" legs that allow him to run at superhuman speeds and Plasma Tusks that can extend out of a device built into his left forearm.
- Kachonga, also known by the codename "Hog Kong", is described as being "the strongman of the Cyboars". A dimwitted, short-tempered but goodhearted brute, his powers include super strength and the Super-Sonic Stomp.
- Anthar, also known by the codename "Airboar", is a pilot described as having an "ego bigger than the seven galaxies combined". His powers include "cyboarnetics" that allow him to transform into a missile-firing, supersonic jet.
- Dr. Genetti is the head scientist of C.O.R.E. (Cybernetic Organisms Robotic Engineering). He combined human and Stygorian technology to save the Wylde Pack's lives and now helps them on their mission on Earth.
- Glitch is an orphan boy who was once one of the children enslaved by Stagorex who used him as a spy, but now he is the loyal and daring young sidekick of the Cyboars.

== Episode list ==
The Cyboars website states that 31 episodes have been made, however no information about the twenty-six episodes following the first five is given on the website.

List of Cyboars Episodes
Episode name	
Episode 1 - Crash Landing	Bushar awakens in a dark place, wired up, and meets a mysterious robot. A flashback occurs, showing the Wylde Pack on the planet of Bytron attempting to save Stygorian scientist Ardonna after a distress call from a lab, getting chased by Renegades. The flashback ends, and Bushar finds out the robot is Ardonna, and finds out that he also now is part-machine.
Episode 2 - Island Getaway	Ardonna introduces Bushar to Dr. Genetti in the C.O.R.E. lab, who explains that cyboarging them was the only way to save their lives. They visit Staghorn Island, the secret base of the evil android Stagorex, to find the missing parts of the ship, and the defence system of the island is run by unconsenting kids with genius brains. One of the kids, Glitch, is revealed to the viewers that he is a spy for Stagorex.
Episode 3 - A Matter of Trust	Ardonna goes for one of the ship parts alone, while Bushar, Airboar and Stampede go for the other one. Ardonna finds Glitch, who snuck onto her ship, and an unknowing Glitch accidentally tracks their location to the Renegades via his watch. The Renegades analyze her Cyboar technology, while Glitch sends a signal to Bushar and Stampede who then rescue them.
Episode 4 - The Road Home	The newly Cyboarg'd Sen Sunar is introduced. Ardonna reveals that she has rebuilt the ship, but the group disagrees on whether they should take off or stay to fight the Renegades. Stagorex asks Glitch to disable the security system to the lab, but he refuses and throws away the watch. The watch turns into a robotic spider, disabling the security system. The Renegades steal the ship, with Genetti still inside it.
Episode 5 - The Vote	Hog Kong asks to be Cyboarg'd. Glitch reveals that Stagorex was able to obtain the technology because of him, and the Cyboars take a vote on whether Glitch should be voted out or not. Glitch arrives to Staghorn Island in a raft, tricks the Renegades into thinking he was abandoned by the Cyboars and is then able to sabotage the systems so the Cyboars can attack the base and rescue Genetti. Their ship gets destroyed, and the Cyboars realize that their fate is to stay on Earth and protect it.

== Reception ==
According to an article on the Cyboars website, the show exceeded 500,000 on-demand downloads six weeks after the launch of the first five episodes, and became the fastest growing series on the Kabillion network.
