= Cardfight!! Vanguard season 1 (2011 series) =

Cardfight!! Vanguard
- Season 1
- No. of episodes: 65

Release
- Original network: TV Tokyo, TV Aichi, AT-X, Cartoon Network Korea
- Original release: January 8, 2011 – March 31, 2012

Season chronology
- Next → Asia Circuit (season 2)

The first season of Cardfight!! Vanguard, titled Cardfight!! Vanguard (Japanese: カードファイト!! ヴァンガード, Hepburn: Kādofaito!! Vangādo), aired in Japan beginning on January 8, 2011, and concluded on March 31, 2012, airing 65 episodes.

In July 2010, an anime television series based on the game was green-lit by TMS Entertainment under the directorial supervision of Hatsuki Tsuji. Music is composed by Takayuki Negishi while Mari Tominaga provided the character designs. The series was broadcast on TV Aichi and then by AT-X, TV Tokyo, TV Osaka, and TV Setouchi systems. The media-streaming website Crunchyroll simulcasted the first season to the United States, Canada, the United Kingdom, and Ireland. Crunchyroll began streaming the second season to the United States, Canada, and the United Kingdom on June 30, 2012.

Twenty-five pieces of theme music are used for the series—nine opening themes and seventeen closing themes (one of which is exclusive to the English dub). The anime also features two insert songs performed by Ultra Rare (i.e. Suzuko Mimori, Yoshino Nanjō, and Aimi Terakawa, who are the original Japanese voice actresses of Kourin, Rekka, and Suiko). The two songs are "Miracle Trigger ~Tomorrow Will Be Ultra Rare!~" (ミラクルトリガー ~きっと明日はウルトラレア!~) (used in episodes 18, 26, and 115; simply known as "Miracle Trigger" in the English dub) and "Stand Up! DREAM" (スタンドアップ! DREAM) (used in episodes 39, 115, and 118).

An English dub co-produced by Ocean Productions (recorded at Blue Water Studios) began airing on Singapore's Okto channel from October 16, 2011, on Animax Asia from January 22, 2012, and on Malaysia's RTM-TV2 channel from November 18, 2012. Dubbed episodes also began being released on YouTube from May 29, 2012. The series can be seen legally on a dedicated channel for it created by Bushiroad, the original creators and manufacturers of the card game, and as of June 25 is available for viewing in most countries without geo-blocking.

While there are a few changes, the English dub adaption is mostly faithful to the original Japanese version. However, the most notable change in the English dub is that three opening themes and three ending themes are used. The only openings are English versions of the first opening theme "Vanguard" (from eps. 1–65), the third opening theme "Limit Break" (from eps. 66–104), and the fourth opening theme "Vanguard Fight" (from eps. 105 onward), all of which are still performed by their original respective artists.

The first ending theme used in the dub is an English version of the third ending theme "Dream Shooter" (from eps. 1–65) while the second ending theme is a unique song titled "Way To Victory" (from eps. 66–104), both of which are performed by Sea☆A. The ending credit sequence for this exclusive theme is the one used for the original sixth ending theme "Jōnetsu-ism". The third ending theme used in the dub is an English version of the original ninth ending song "Endless☆Fighter" (from eps. 105 onward), which is performed only by Aimi Terakawa in the dub. Similarly, the Ultra Rare insert songs are performed in English by Suzuko Mimori, Yoshino Nanjō, and Aimi Terakawa (the original Japanese voice actresses of Kourin, Rekka, and Suiko).

Individual episodes from seasons 1-4 are known as "Rides".

== Plot ==
The protagonist of this story, Aichi Sendou, is a timid boy in his third year of middle school. He had been living his life looking backward rather than forward, trying not to stand out. However, he had one thing that kept him going: Blaster Blade, a card from a card game that was given to him when he was little. That card is the reason why he begins to engage in Card Fights, something that changes his life drastically.

The name of the card game is "Vanguard." The game takes place in a different planet called "Cray," and due to a never before seen play system, it becomes popular throughout the world.

Aichi, immediately attracted by Vanguard, meets friends such as Misaki Tokura and Kamui Katsuragi, along with other rivals. Through friendly rivalry with them, Aichi begins to enjoy a fulfilling life. Aichi, however, has a goal: to once again battle with a Vanguard Fighter by the name of Toshiki Kai. Kai is an aloof and cold-hearted high school student who has outstanding abilities in the world of Vanguard. He is also the reason why Aichi started playing the game. For him, Toshiki is the person who saved him from his boring life and introduced him to Vanguard. In order to get better at Vanguard, Aichi puts his soul into it every day. He wishes that someday, he'll be able to battle Toshiki and have him recognize his worth.

He soon learns about a power called PSY Qualia, and another boy called Ren Suzugamori, who also has the same power.

The original season of Cardfight!! Vanguard centers on main character Aichi Sendou's introduction to the titular card game. Over time, he makes new friends, competes in the National Championships, and confronts a mysterious power called Psyqualia .

== Theme songs ==
Opening themes

- "Vanguard" by JAM Project (eps. 1–33) (eps. 1–65 in English dub)
- "Believe in My Existence" by JAM Project (eps. 34–65)

Ending themes

- "Diamond Stars☆" (ダイヤモンドスター☆, "Daiyamondo Sutā☆") by Natsuko Aso (eps. 1–15)
- "Smash Up!!" by Shīna Hekīru (eps. 16–25)
- "Dream Shooter" by Sea☆A (eps. 26–38) (eps. 1–65 in English dub)
- "Starting Again" by Sayaka Sasaki (eps. 39–52)
- "Nakimushi Treasures" by Saori Kodama featuring Milky Holmes (Suzuko Mimori, Izumi Kitta, Sora Tokui, and Mikoi Sasaki) (eps. 53–65)

== Episode list ==
No.	Title	Original release date
1	"Vanguard of Destiny!"; Transliteration: "Unmei no Vangādo!!" (Japanese: 運命の先導者!!)	January 8, 2011
2	"Ride to Victory!"; Transliteration: "Shōri e no Raido" (Japanese: 勝利へのライド)	January 15, 2011
3	"Welcome to Card Capital"; Transliteration: "Yōkoso! Kādo Kyapitaru e" (Japanese: ようこそ! カードキャピタルへ)	January 22, 2011
4	"Assault! Twin Drive!"; Transliteration: "Mōkō! Tsuin Doraibu" (Japanese: 猛攻! ツインドライブ)	January 29, 2011
5	"Whirlwind! Kamui, the Grade-School Fighter!"; Transliteration: "Senpū! Shōgakusei Faitā Kamui" (Japanese: 旋風! 小学生ファイターカムイ)	February 5, 2011
6	"The Mysterious Card Shop!"; Transliteration: "Nazo no Kādo Shoppu" (Japanese: 謎(なぞ)のカードショップ)	February 12, 2011
7	"The Fearsome Soulblast!"; Transliteration: "Senritsu no Souruburasuto" (Japanese: 戦(せん)慄(りつ)のソウルブラスト)	February 19, 2011
8	"The King of Knights Enters The Fray!"; Transliteration: "Kishi-ō, Shutsujin!" (Japanese: 騎士王、出陣!)	February 26, 2011
9	"The Shop Tournament Begins!"; Transliteration: "Shoppu Taikai Kaimaku" (Japanese: ショップ大会開幕)	March 5, 2011
10	"Enter the Ninja Fighter!"; Transliteration: "Ninja Faitā, Sanjō" (Japanese: 忍者ファイター、参上)	March 12, 2011
11	"Ninja Fighter Withdraws!"; Transliteration: "Ninja Faitā, Taijō" (Japanese: 忍者ファイター、退場)	March 19, 2011
12	"Aichi vs. Kamui"; Transliteration: "Aichi VS Kamui" (Japanese: アイチVSカムイ)	March 26, 2011
13	"Shop Tournament Winner Crowned!"; Transliteration: "Kecchaku! Shoppu Taikai" (Japanese: 決着! ショップ大会)	April 2, 2011
14	"The Fearsome Undead! The Granblue Deck!"; Transliteration: "Fushi no Kyōfu! Guranburū Dekki" (Japanese: 不死の恐怖! グランブルーデッキ)	April 9, 2011
15	"Thrilling! Emi's First Fight!"; Transliteration: "Harahara!? Emi no Hatsu Faito" (Japanese: ハラハラ!? エミの初ファイト)	April 16, 2011
16	"Team Q4 Heads for the Regional Tournament!"; Transliteration: "Chīmu Q4, Chiku Taikai e" (Japanese: チームQ4(キューフォー)、地区大会へ)	April 30, 2011
17	"New Allies"; Transliteration: "Aratanaru Nakama-tachi" (Japanese: 新たなる仲間たち)	May 7, 2011
18	"White-Hot Tournament!"; Transliteration: "Hakunetsu no Tōnamento!" (Japanese: 白熱のトーナメント!)	May 14, 2011
19	"Showdown! Nova Grappler!"; Transliteration: "Kessen! Nova Gurappurā!" (Japanese: 決戦! ノヴァグラップラー!)	May 21, 2011
20	"Hidden Message"; Transliteration: "Himerareta Messēji" (Japanese: 秘められたメッセージ)	May 28, 2011
21	"Rematch in the Final Match!"; Transliteration: "Kesshō de no Saisen!!" (Japanese: 決勝での再戦!!)	June 4, 2011
22	"The Holy Dragon Descends"; Transliteration: "Maiorita Hijiri Ryū" (Japanese: 舞い降りた聖龍)	June 11, 2011
23	"Fateful Encounter"; Transliteration: "Unmei no Deai" (Japanese: 運命の出会い)	June 18, 2011
24	"The Indelible Memory"; Transliteration: "Kesenai Kioku" (Japanese: 消せない記憶)	June 25, 2011
25	"Beyond the Memories"; Transliteration: "Kioku no Saki ni" (Japanese: 記憶の先に)	July 2, 2011
26	"A Stormy Beginning! The National Championship!"; Transliteration: "Haran no Makuake! Zenkoku Taikai!!" (Japanese: 波乱の幕開け! 全国大会!!)	July 9, 2011
27	"Jurassic Army"; Transliteration: "Jurashikku Āmī" (Japanese: ジュラシックアーミー)	July 16, 2011
28	"Aggressive Movement! Tachikaze Deck!!"; Transliteration: "Mōshin! Tachikaze Dekki!!" (Japanese: 猛進! たちかぜデッキ!!)	July 23, 2011
29	"When the Moon is Full"; Transliteration: "Tsuki, Michiru Toki" (Japanese: 月、 満ちるとき)	July 30, 2011
30	"The Strongest Team, Asteroid! / The Strongest Team, AL4!"; Transliteration: "Saikyō chīmu, A(Apekkusu)L(Rimiteddo)4(Fō)!" (Japanese: 最強チーム、AL4(アペックスリミテッドフォー)！)	August 6, 2011
31	"Beautiful Assassin"; Transliteration: "Utsukushiki Asashin" (Japanese: 美しきアサシン)	August 13, 2011
32	"Demon World General"; Transliteration: "Makai no Shōgun" (Japanese: 魔界の将軍)	August 20, 2011
33	"Blaster of Darkness"; Transliteration: "Shikkoku no Burasutā" (Japanese: 漆黒のブラスター)	August 27, 2011
34	"It's Summer! It's Camp! It's Vanguard!"; Transliteration: "Natsu da! Gasshuku da! Vangādo da!" (Japanese: 夏だ! 合宿だ! ヴァンガードだ!)	September 3, 2011
35	"Results of the Training Camp"; Transliteration: "Gasshuku no Seika" (Japanese: 合宿の成果)	September 10, 2011
36	"The King of Underground Fights"; Transliteration: "Ura Faito no Ō" (Japanese: 裏ファイトの王)	September 17, 2011
37	"The Return of the Ninja Master"; Transliteration: "Kaettekita Ninja Masutā" (Japanese: 帰ってきた忍者マスター)	September 24, 2011
38	"Miwa's Ability"; Transliteration: "Miwa no Jitsuryoku" (Japanese: 三和の実力)	October 1, 2011
39	"Return to Regionals"; Transliteration: "Chiku Taikai, Futatabi" (Japanese: 地区大会、 再び)	October 8, 2011
40	"Dangerous Scent"; Transliteration: "Kiken na Nioi" (Japanese: 危険な匂い)	October 15, 2011
41	"Kyou's Revenge"; Transliteration: "Fukushū no Kyō" (Japanese: 復讐のキョウ)	October 22, 2011
42	"Psyqualia"; Transliteration: "PSY Kuoria" (Japanese: PSYクオリア)	October 29, 2011
43	"The Black Vanguard"; Transliteration: "Kuroi Sendō-sha" (Japanese: 黒い先導者)	November 5, 2011
44	"Unexpected Visitor"; Transliteration: "Yokisenu Raikyaku" (Japanese: 予期せぬ来客)	November 12, 2011
45	"Shadow Paladin"; Transliteration: "Shadō Paradin" (Japanese: シャドウパラディン)	November 19, 2011
46	"The Coiling Thread"; Transliteration: "Karamitsuku Ito" (Japanese: 絡みつく糸)	November 26, 2011
47	"Another Asteroid / Another Foo Fighter"; Transliteration: "Mō Hitotsu no Fū Faitā" (Japanese: もう一つのフーファイター)	December 3, 2011
48	"Lonely Fight"; Transliteration: "Kodoku na Faito" (Japanese: 孤独なファイト)	December 10, 2011
49	"Kai's Battle"; Transliteration: "Kai no Tatakai" (Japanese: 櫂の戦い)	December 17, 2011
50	"At the End of the Battle..."; Transliteration: "Tatakai no Hate ni..." (Japanese: 戦いの果てに...)	December 24, 2011
51	"Golden Glow"; Transliteration: "Ōgon no Kagayaki" (Japanese: 黄金の輝き)	December 31, 2011
52	"Songstress of the Sea"; Transliteration: "Yōjō no Utahime" (Japanese: 洋上の歌姫)	January 7, 2012
53	"The Battle Begins! Tournament Finals"; Transliteration: "Kaisen! Kesshō Tōnamento" (Japanese: 開戦! 決勝トーナメント)	January 7, 2012
54	"Gladiator"; Transliteration: "Guradiētā" (Japanese: 剣闘士(グラディエーター))	January 14, 2012
55	"Caesar's Empress"; Transliteration: "Kaesaru no Jōtei" (Japanese: カエサルの女帝)	January 21, 2012
56	"The Man They Call "The Emperor"!"; Transliteration: "Kōtei to Yobareru Otoko" (Japanese: 皇帝と呼ばれる男)	January 28, 2012
57	"Fateful Showdown!"; Transliteration: "Shukumei no Taiketsu" (Japanese: 宿命の対決)	February 4, 2012
58	"Clash! Overlord"; Transliteration: "Gekitotsu! Ōbārōdo" (Japanese: 激突! オーバーロード)	February 11, 2012
59	"Fighting for the Top Spot"; Transliteration: "Chōten no Za o Kakete" (Japanese: 頂点の座を賭けて)	February 18, 2012
60	"Wall of the General"; Transliteration: "Shōgun no Kabe" (Japanese: 将軍の壁)	February 25, 2012
61	"Feelings Towards Asteroid / Feelings Towards Foo Fighter"; Transliteration: "Fū Faitā e no Omoi" (Japanese: フーファイターへの想い)	March 3, 2012
62	"Lord of the Fight"; Transliteration: "Faito no Shihaisha" (Japanese: ファイトの支配者)	March 10, 2012
63	"Two Powers, Side-by-Side"; Transliteration: "Narabitatsu Nōryokusha" (Japanese: 並び立つ能力者)	March 17, 2012
64	"The Truth of Psyqualia"; Transliteration: "Saikuoria no Shinjitsu" (Japanese: PSYクオリアの真実)	March 24, 2012
65	"Awakening of the Twin Blades"; Transliteration: "Mezameshi Sōken" (Japanese: 目覚めし双剣)	March 31, 2012
