= Super 10 (disambiguation) =

Super 10 may refer to:

- Super 10 (rugby union), the rugby union competition held between 1993 and 1995 in the Southern Hemisphere which preceded the Super 12
- Top12, the national rugby union competition in Italy, was formerly known as Super 10
- Chengdu Super-10 (also known as the J-10C), a proposed variant of the Chengdu J-10 multirole fighter
