= Inuyasha: Feudal Combat =

2005 video game

- Developer: Eighting
- Publisher: Bandai
- Engine: RenderWare
- Platform: PlayStation 2
- Release: JP: June 16, 2005; NA: August 23, 2005
- Genre: Fighting
- Modes: Single-player, multiplayer

Inuyasha: Feudal Combat (Note: Japanese: 犬夜叉 奥義乱舞, Hepburn: Inuyasha: Ōgi-Ranbu) is a 3D fighting game for the PlayStation 2 based on the Inuyasha manga and anime series.

Bandai planned to release this video game on August 16, 2005 in North America, but it was postponed to August 23 due to the Miyagi earthquake. It was released in Japan on June 16, 2005.

== Gameplay ==
In Inuyasha: Feudal Combat, up to four characters, two per team, may be present at once in a battle, however, two player characters cannot be on the same team. (i.e. Player 1 as main fighter; Player 2 as their partner) Both the player and opponent may each select another character as their partner. There are four modes of gameplay, including Story, Mission, Battle, and Practice modes.

When the Spirit Gauge is full, a special Finishing Move can be performed. Each character's basic Finishing Move can be activated by pressing and holding the circle button. But when a character is fighting alongside a partner and the duo reaches Great affinity, pressing circle will trigger a combined Finishing Move, a combined team attack between the two characters. Certain player/partner combinations will have their own special finishing move together. Those combinations are:

- Inuyasha/Sesshomaru
- Inuyasha/Kikyo
- Inuyasha/Kagome
- Kikyo/Kagome
- Sango/Miroku

Four different formations (the different ways the player's partner can assist the player) can be selected during the battle: Wind formation (partner mimics the actions of the player), Forest formation (the player and the partner are always targeted on different opponents), Mountain formation (partner stays between the player and opponent and blocks enemy attacks) or Fire formation (both player and partner focus on the same opponent and attack continuously). The Fire and Mountain formations also increase the strength and defense of the player and partner, respectively.

Affinity will have an effect on what the characters say to each other.

- Bad Affinity - Not very good at all.
- Normal Affinity - How they would normally treat each other.
- Good Affinity - Pretty well.
- Great Affinity - Good enough to pull off the Combined Finishing Move.

Also, some characters will have a certain affinity from the start. For example, Inuyasha and Koga will have a low affinity, however, Inuyasha and Kagome will have a high affinity.

== Story mode ==
In Story Mode, the player must choose to follow first Inuyasha's, then Sango and Miroku, then Sesshomaru's, and finally Shippo's "Chapter". These consist of a series of battles interlaced with cut scenes illustrating a story. If the player is KO'd (knocked out) in one of these battles, a screen with the option to reattempt the last battle is available. If each of these stories is completed without the player getting KO'd even once, then a new character can be selected in "Battle", "Practice", and "Mission" modes as the player/partner. Those characters are:

- Inuyasha's chapter - Naraku
- Sango/Miroku's Chapter - Bankotsu
- Shippo's Chapter - Human Inuyasha
- Sesshomaru's Chapter - Demon Inuyasha

== Reception ==
Reception

Aggregate score
Aggregator	Score
Metacritic	52/100

Review scores
Publication	Score
GameSpot	6/10
GameSpy	3.5/5
GameZone	5.1/10
IGN	4/10
Official U.S. PlayStation Magazine	2/5
PlayStation: The Official Magazine	5.5/10
X-Play	2/5

The game received "mixed" reviews according to video game review aggregator Metacritic.
