= Greatest Hits Vol. 16 =

Compilation album by The Donnas
- Released: July 7, 2009
- Recorded: 1995–97, 2001, 2003, 2007–09
- Genre: Hard rock, punk rock
- Length: 38:16
- Label: Purple Feather, RedEye
- Producer: Allison Robertson; Brett Anderson; Maya Ford; Torry Castellano; Jay Ruston; Robert Shimp; Darin Raffaelli

The Donnas chronology
Bitchin' (2007)	Greatest Hits Vol. 16 (2009)	The Donnas Early Singles 1995-1999 (2023)

Greatest Hits Vol. 16 is a compilation album by the American rock band The Donnas, released in 2009 through Purple Feather Records, the band's independent record label. Despite its title, it is neither a greatest hits album nor the sixteenth volume in a series; rather, it is a collection of new material, B-sides, live recordings, previously unreleased tracks, and alternate versions and new recordings of songs from the band's back catalog, which together form a retrospective look at their career. The "Vol. 16" in the title refers to the album being released in the band's sixteenth year, the group having formed in 1993.

== Background ==
The oldest material on the album are the tracks "Teenage Rules" and "I Don't Wanna Break Your Head", which are previously unreleased outtakes from the recording sessions for the band's debut album, The Donnas (1997). "Teenage Rules" was recorded and produced by Darin Raffaelli, who ghostwrote most of The Donnas' early material and released their first album through his Super*Teem! label. Raffaelli shares writing credit with The Donnas on all eight tracks on the second half of Greatest Hits Vol. 16 and sings lead vocals on "I Wanna Be with a Girl Like You", which is an alternate version of the early Donnas song "A Boy Like You" from their debut single, "High School Yum Yum" (1995). "I Don't Wanna Break Your Head" was recorded and produced by Robert Shimp (producer of 2001's The Donnas Turn 21 and 2002's Spend the Night) and re-mixed by Jay Ruston (who produced 2007's Bitchin'). An alternate version of The Donnas' "Hey I'm Gonna Be Your Girl" is also included on Greatest Hits Vol. 16; this version was also recorded and produced by Shimp and re-mixed by Ruston, as were "I Wanna Be with a Girl Like You" and a re-mixed version of "Play My Game" (the original mix appears on The Donnas Turn 21).

Two outtakes from the band's seventh album, Bitchin' (2007), are included on Greatest Hits Vol. 16: "We Own the Night" and "She's Out of Control" were recorded, mixed, and produced by Ruston during the Bitchin' sessions at Clear Lake Audio in North Hollywood, Los Angeles. Also included are live recordings of the band's two highest-charting singles, "Take It Off" and "Fall Behind Me".

For the album's new recordings, The Donnas returned to Clear Lake Audio and used the same production team they had for Bitchin'. "Get Off" and "Perfect Stranger" are new material, while the remaining five tracks are new recordings of songs from the band's back catalog: "High School Yum Yum" was the band's first single, released in 1995, while "I Don't Want to Go to School" appeared on the "Da Doo Ron Ron" single the following year. One song from each of the band's first three studio albums was re-recorded: "Get Rid of That Girl" from The Donnas (1997), "You Make Me Hot" from American Teenage Rock 'n' Roll Machine (1998), and "Get You Alone" from Get Skintight (1999).

== Reception ==
Professional ratings
Review scores
Source	Rating
Allmusic	3.5/5 stars
Robert Christgau	(2-star Honorable Mention)
PopMatters	5/10 stars

Stephen Thomas Erlewine of Allmusic rated Greatest Hits Vol. 16 three and a half stars out of five, calling it "a collection of odds and sods that by its nature would seem to hold interest only for diehards, but there's a smidgeon of truth that this, like other albums called Greatest Hits, can be used as an introduction to The Donnas because it captures their reckless roar as well as any of their other albums. Arguably, it captures their sound better than their glossy major-label platters for Atlantic." Critic Robert Christgau gave it an honorable mention, calling it "one shallow, sexed up, hard rock thing." Keith Carman of Exclaim! reviewed it negatively, calling it "probably one of the most confusing releases in the history of punk rock" and "proof-positive that some bands shouldn't be in charge of their output." "Everything from the title to the song selection and overall rationale behind this (one hesitates to use the word) 'effort' is pointless", he opined. "Starting weakly, a few forgettable B-sides slide into live versions of some mid-career tracks. Fine. But then the affair is rounded out with updated recordings of their formative releases. Why? Who knows, but what's worse is that The Donnas don't even pick their cool songs; they just grab whatever they felt like at the time. Sure, the updated performances are better than the originals but they lack the spunk of those juvenile-yet-enthusiastic versions recorded some ten years ago. And why, at this stage in the game, would they bother going to the trouble?"

Jayson Harsin of PopMatters rated the album five stars out of ten, stating that "For partiers, perverts, and the girl power posse, Greatest Hits Vol. 16 is a must-have. For everyone else—well, if you don't love them by now, this ain't gonna hook your gills. Moreover, its nostalgia may be a turnoff." While speaking positively of "Get Off", the two Bitchin' B-sides, and the live tracks, he found "Perfect Stranger" to be "a cut that sounds right out of early ‘80s pop-rock, with reined-in lead vocals and purring backups. It’s quite a break with the past, and, for this listener, both ill-fitting and a bad omen." He remarked that the album's lyrical content "falls between the two simple poles of catfights over boys and sex-tease power trips over boys. It's hardly a John Hughes film." He also found the re-recorded early songs to sound uncomfortable now that the band members were adults: "When the album shifts away from this power trash theme to meditations on high school ennui, the music has an odor of somewhat uncomfortable nostalgia. Witness Brett Anderson whining 'I Don’t Wanna Go to School No More': 'I don't want to grow up well / I just want my Taco Bell.' This is now coming from thirty year-olds. Ditto for 'Teenage Rules' and “I Don’t Wanna Break Your Head', which are otherwise another couple of great Ramones homages."

== Track listing ==
Writing credits and track information adapted from the album's liner notes.

All tracks are written by (Tracks 1–8) Allison Robertson, Brett Anderson, Maya Ford, Torry Castellano; (Tracks 9–16) Robertson, Anderson, Ford, Castellano, Darin Raffaelli.

No.	Title	Length
1.	"Get Off"	2:46
2.	"Perfect Stranger"	3:05
3.	"We Own the Night" (previously unreleased B-side from the Bitchin' sessions, 2007)	2:49
4.	"She's Out of Control" (previously unreleased B-side from the Bitchin' sessions, 2007)	2:34
5.	"Take It Off" (live; studio version appears on Spend the Night, 2002)	3:31
6.	"Fall Behind Me" (live; studio version appears on Gold Medal, 2004)	3:34
7.	"Get You Alone" (2009 recording; original recording appears on Get Skintight, 1999)	2:43
8.	"Play My Game" (remixed; original mix appears on The Donnas Turn 21, 2001)	3:06
9.	"You Make Me Hot" (2009 recording; original recording appears on American Teenage Rock 'n' Roll Machine, 1998)	2:29
10.	"Get Rid of That Girl" (2009 recording; original recording appears on The Donnas, 1997)	1:50
11.	"Hey I'm Gonna Be Your Girl" (alternate version; original version appears on The Donnas, 1997)	2:04
12.	"I Wanna Be with a Girl Like You" (featuring Darin Raffaelli; alternate version of "A Boy Like You" from the "High School Yum Yum" single, 1995)	1:33
13.	"I Don't Want to Go to School" (2009 recording; original recording appears on the "Da Doo Ron Ron" single, 1995)	2:16
14.	"Teenage Rules" (previously unreleased B-side from The Donnas sessions, 1997)	0:55
15.	"I Don't Wanna Break Your Head" (previously unreleased B-side from The Donnas sessions, 1997)	1:15
16.	"High School Yum Yum" (2009 recording; original recording appears on the "High School Yum Yum" single, 1995)	1:45

== Personnel ==
Credits adapted from the album's liner notes.

The Donnas

- Brett Anderson (Donna A.) – lead vocals
- Allison Robertson (Donna R.) – guitars, backing vocals
- Maya Ford (Donna F.) – bass, backing vocals
- Torry Castellano (Donna C.) – drums, percussion, backing vocals

Additional musicians

- Darin Raffaelli – lead vocals on track 12, production and recording engineering of track 14

Production

- The Donnas – production
- Jay Ruston – production, recording engineering, and mixing of tracks 1–6, 8–10, 13, and 16; re-mixing of tracks 7, 11, 12, and 15
- Robert Shimp – production, recording engineering of tracks 7, 11, 12, and 15
- G. Preston Boebel – assistant recording engineering
- Stephen Marsh – audio mastering
- Stephanie Villa – mastering assistance

Artwork

- Janée Meadows – art direction, design, cover art
- Neil Zlozower – back cover, other band photographs
