= The Donnas discography =

- Studio albums: 7
- Compilation albums: 2
- Singles: 15
- Music videos: 12

The discography of American band The Donnas consists of 7 studio albums, 2 compilations and numerous singles and appearances on various other media.

== Studio albums ==
Title	Details	Peak chart positions									Sales
Title	Details	US	US Indie	AUS	GER	SCO	SWE	UK	UK Indie	UK Rock	Sales
The Donnas	Release date: 1997; Label: Super*Teem!; Formats: CD, LP, music download,	—	—	—	—	—	—	—	—	—	US: 26,000
American Teenage Rock 'n' Roll Machine	Release date: January 27, 1998; Label: Lookout Records; Formats: CD, LP, music download,	—	—	—	—	—	—	—	—	—	US: 33,000
Get Skintight	Release date: June 8, 1999; Label: Lookout Records; Formats: CD, LP, music download,	—	—	—	—	—	—	—	—	—	US: 60,000
The Donnas Turn 21	Release date: January 23, 2001; Label: Lookout Records; Formats: CD, LP, music download,	— (Note: The Donnas Turn 21 did not enter the Billboard 200, but peaked at number 22 on the US Heatseekers chart.)	17	—	—	—	—	—	—	—	US: 68,000
Spend the Night	Release date: October 22, 2002; Label: Atlantic; Formats: CD, LP, music download,	62	—	68	72	88	19	111	—	—	US: 427,000
Gold Medal	Release date: October 26, 2004; Label: Atlantic; Formats: CD, LP, music download,	76	—	94	—	—	—	—	—	23	US: 87,000
Bitchin'	Release date: September 18, 2007; Label: Purple Feather, RedEye; Formats: CD, LP, music download,	89	9	—	—	—	—	—	44	—	
"—" denotes a recording that did not chart or was not released in that territory.

== Compilations ==
- Greatest Hits Vol. 16 (2009)
- The Donnas Early Singles 1995-1999 (2023)

== Singles ==
Title	Year	Peak chart positions										Album
Title	Year	US Sales	US Act. Rock	US Alt.	US Herit. Rock	US Main. Rock	AUS	NL	SCO	UK	UK Rock	Album
"High School Yum Yum"	1995	—	—	—	—	—	—	—	—	—	—	The Donnas
"Let's Go Mano"	1996	—	—	—	—	—	—	—	—	—	—	The Donnas
"Da Doo Ron Ron"	1996	—	—	—	—	—	—	—	—	—	—	The Donnas
"Wig-Wam Bam"	1998	—	—	—	—	—	—	—	—	—	—	The Donnas Early Singles 1995-1999
"Rock 'n' Roll Machine"	1998	—	—	—	—	—	—	—	—	—	—	American Teenage Rock 'n' Roll Machine
"Strutter"	1999	—	—	—	—	—	—	—	—	—	—	The Donnas Early Singles 1995-1999
"Get You Alone"	1999	—	—	—	—	—	—	—	—	—	—	Get Skintight
"40 Boys in 40 Nights"	2002	—	—	—	—	—	—	—	—	—	—	The Donnas Turn 21
"Take It Off"	2002	—	32	17	29	31	—	100	39	38	35	Spend the Night
"Who Invited You"	2003	65	—	—	—	—	84	—	59	61	14	Spend the Night
"Too Bad About Your Girl"	2003	—	—	—	—	—	—	—	—	—	—	Spend the Night
"Fall Behind Me"	2004	—	—	29	—	—	93	—	52	55	7	Gold Medal
"I Don't Want to Know (If You Don't Want Me)"	2005	—	—	—	—	—	—	—	51	55	—	Gold Medal
"Don't Wait Up for Me"	2007	—	—	—	—	—	—	—	—	—	—	Bitchin'
"Get Off"	2009	—	—	—	—	—	—	—	—	—	—	Greatest Hits Vol. 16
"—" denotes a recording that did not chart or was not released in that territory.

== Songs on soundtracks and compilations ==
- "Speeding Back to My Baby" – Gearhead Compilation (1998)
- "Strutter" – Detroit Rock City soundtrack (1999)
- "Keep on Loving You" – Drive Me Crazy soundtrack (1999)
- "Rock n' Roll Machine" – Jawbreaker soundtrack (1999)
- "Checkin' It Out" – Jawbreaker soundtrack (1999)
- "Wig-Wam Bam" – Runnin' on Fumes! / The Gearhead Magazine Singles Compilation (2000)
- "Backstage" – Freaky Friday soundtrack (2003)
- "Too Bad About Your Girl" – Grind soundtrack (2003)
- "Take It Off" – Dodgeball soundtrack (2004)
- "Take Me to the Backseat" – D.E.B.S soundtrack (2004)
- "Dancing With Myself" – Mean Girls OST (2004) & I Love You, Man (2009) & “Dangerous Animals” (2025)
- "Please Don't Tease" – New York Minute soundtrack (2004)
- "Everyone Is Wrong" – Elektra soundtrack (2005)
- "Roll on Down the Highway" – Herbie: Fully Loaded soundtrack (2005)
- "Drive My Car" – This Bird Has Flown – A 40th Anniversary Tribute to the Beatles' Rubber Soul (2005)
- "I Don't Want To Know (If You Don't Want Me)" – The N Soundtrack (2006)
- "California Sun" -(Brett Anderson solo), "Brats On The Beat:Ramones For Kids" (2006)
- "Kids In America" – Nancy Drew soundtrack (2007)
- "Christmas Wrapping" – Shrek The Halls soundtrack (2007)
- "Round and Round" – (w/ Stephen Pearcy of RATT), Stephen Pearcy's "Under My Skin" (2008)
- "Take It Off" – The Hangover soundtrack (2009)
- "Queens of Noise" – Take It or Leave It – A Tribute to the Queens of Noise: The Runaways (2011)

== As Ragady Anne ==
- Ragady Anne [7-inch EP] (1995) (Radio Trash Records)

== As The Electrocutes ==
- Steal Yer Lunch Money (released 1998) (Sympathy for the Record Industry)

== Film and television appearances ==
- Jawbreaker (TriStar Pictures, 1999)
- Drive Me Crazy (20th Century Fox, 1999)
- Saturday Night Live (NBC, 2003) (hosted by Ray Liotta)
- Bud Light commercial (2003)
- I Love the '90s (VH1, 2004)
- Charmed (2004)
- Mad TV (2005)
- I Love the '70s: Volume 2 (VH1, 2006)
- I Love the New Millennium (VH1, 2008)
- Beautiful Noise (2008)
- WCG Ultimate Gamer (2009)
- VH1's Undateable (2010)

== Music videos ==
- 1998: "Get Rid Of That Girl"
- 1999: "Skintight" & "Strutter"
- 2001: "40 Boys in 40 Nights" & "Do You Wanna Hit It?" (animated)
- 2002: "Take It Off" & "Who Invited You"
- 2003: "Too Bad About Your Girl"
- 2004: "Fall Behind Me"
- 2005: "I Don't Want To Know (If You Don't Want Me)"
- 2007: "Don't Wait Up For Me"
- 2009: "Get Off" (career spanning footage)
