= * (disambiguation) =

* is an asterisk, a typographical symbol or glyph.

* may also refer to:

== Music ==
- "*", a song from the 2000 album Lego by Sadist
- "*", a song from the 2005 album Before the Dawn Heals Us by M83
- "Asterisk" or "*: Asterisk", a 2005 song by Orange Range
- *, the logo for the alternative rock band the Red Hot Chili Peppers

== Computing and telecommunications ==
- In most programming languages, the operator for computing a product — see Multiplication sign § Similar notations
  - For an exception, see APL (programming language) § Exponentiation
- In glob-style syntax, the wildcard character representing any (possibly empty) sequence of characters
- In standard regular expression syntax, the postfix operator for repeating the operand zero or more times
- In many lightweight markup languages:
  - The prefix and suffix for bold or italics formatting
  - The prefix for an unordered (bulleted) list
- In Ruby and Python, the prefix operator for expanding an iterable into arguments to a function, or for collecting function arguments into a list — see Asterisk § Programming languages
- In C and some descendants, the operator (between the type and name) for declaring a pointer, and the prefix operator for dereferencing one
- In Perl, the prefix operator for a typeglob
- In Common Lisp's "earmuff convention", the prefix and suffix for the name of a special (dynamically scoped) variable
- A line comment prefix in CONFIG.SYS on PTS-DOS
- Star key (telephony), the beginning of a vertical service code (VSC)

== Mathematics ==
- ∗, star (game theory), the value given to the game where both players have only the option of moving to the zero game
- *, Kleene star, the postfix operator for repeating the operand zero or more times
- $*$, the infix operator for the convolution of two functions
- $*$, the infix operator for the free product of two groups
- ${}^*$, a suffix operator for the conjugate transpose, or more generally, the Hermitian adjoint
- *, the suffix operator for a *-algebra, a structure consisting of two involutive rings, where one is commutative, and the other has the structure of an associative algebra over the first
- *, the suffix operator for a *-autonomous category, a symmetric monoidal closed category equipped with a dualizing object
- *, the prefix operator for a *-finite set, also called "hyperfinite"
- *, the suffix operator for the involution of a *-regular semigroup

== Other uses ==
- In cricket, the suffix for not out after a batter's score
- In population genetics, the suffix for a paragroup of a haplogroup
- In historical linguistics, the prefix for a reconstructed, ungrammatical, or otherwise hypothetical form
- In astronomy, often represents a star
- In typography, used to refer a reader to a footnote or an endnote

== See also ==
- Asterisk § Usage
- Blackstar (album), a 2016 album by David Bowie, stylized as ★
- *Star, an abstract strategy game
- Asterisk (disambiguation)
- Splat (disambiguation)
- Star (disambiguation)
- ** (disambiguation)
- *** (disambiguation)
- *= (disambiguation)
- Special:PrefixIndex/*
- A* (disambiguation)
- C* (disambiguation)
- F* (programming language)
- i*, a modelling language
- L*, a learning algorithm outputting a deterministic finite automaton
- /* and */, the prefix and suffix for a block comment in C-family computer languages
