= List of WCG Ultimate Gamer episodes =

This page lists all of the episodes from the seasons of the Syfy original series WCG Ultimate Gamer.

== Episode format ==
Each episode consists of two main challenges based around a particular videogame title. These include a Real Life Challenge, inspired by the game, and an Isolation Challenge where players try to earn the best score within a game. Rankings are determined by the combined ranking of both challenges. The player with the lowest overall ranking must face the Elimination Round, whilst the player with the highest overall ranking may choose another player to enter the Elimination Round. The two selected players face off head-to-head in the week's selected game, with the loser being eliminated from the competition. In some episodes, an additional challenge may be presented, in which players can win a special prize, such as an advantage in the following challenge. In episode 7, the players compete in Gauntlet Challenges, where the lowest scorers in each challenge would be eliminated. In episode 8, the winner is determined by who wins the best out of three challenges.

== Season 1 ==
=== Contestants ===
| Contestant | Alias | Game Specialty | Accomplishments |
|---|---|---|---|
| Adande Thorne | sWooZie | Fighting | Dead or Alive 4 player for LA CompLexity in the 2007 Championship Gaming Series season. |
| Alyson Bridge | Nin9tyNin9 | Shooters | Ex-Frag Dolls member (Under alias "Calyber"); Rainbow 6 champion |
| Amy Brady | Athena PMS | Shooters | Co-Leader of PMS Clan; Frag Doll "Valkyrie". Various tournament placements to include first all-female team with 1st placement in a co-ed pro-tournament at Winter CPL 2006. |
| Chelsea Alek-Finkelman | Delicate | Shooters | Member of the PMS Clan. Pro Player CS 1.6 |
| Ciji Thornton | StarSlay3r | Rhythm | Top Ranked Woman Guitar Hero player. |
| Daniel “Dante” Kim | DevilsAlastar | Racing | Professional video game tester |
| Geoff Robinson | iNcontroL | Strategy | Professional StarCraft player, member of Team Evil Genius (EG); WCG USA Champion |
| Jamal Nickens | Zophar321 | Fighting | Winner of "Life to the Power of X", a similar 5-minute video game reality TV show on USA. |
| JD Dorfman | KosherHamm | Sports | Fraternity Tournament Champion in Madden; Member of online Madden and NHL 2008 Leagues |
| Kelly Kelley | MrsViolence | Shooters | Pro Gears of War player; Member of the vVv clan. |
| Mark Smith | applesauce | Shooters | Played for a CSS team in leagues such as CAL and Cyber Evolution (CEVO) Steamid: 0:0:390669. WCG Ultimate Gamer |
| Robert Paz | Prod1gy X | Shooters | Won a competition in the Global Gaming League. |

=== Contestant Progress ===
| Rank | Contestant | Ep. 1 | Ep. 2 | Ep. 3 | Ep. 4 | Ep. 5^{1} | Ep. 6 | Ep. 7^{2} | | | Ep. 8 |
|---|---|---|---|---|---|---|---|---|---|---|---|
| 1st | Mark | 6th | 6th | 5th | 7th | 1st | 1st | 4th | 4th | 2nd | 1st |
| 2nd | Robert | 12th | 8th | 3rd | 2nd | 2nd | 6th | 3rd | 2nd | 1st | 2nd |
| 3rd | Jamal | 2nd | 4th | 4th | 3rd | 4th | 5th | 1st | 3rd | 3rd | |
| 4th | Swoozie | 1st | 3rd | 7th | 1st | 6th | 2nd | 2nd | 1st | 4th | |
| 5th | Amy | 7th | 10th | 6th | 8th | 3rd | 3rd | 5th | 5th | | |
| 6th | Chelsea | 3rd | 7th | 9th | 4th | 5th | 4th | 6th | | | |
| 7th | Ciji | 5th | 9th | 2nd | 5th | 7th | 7th | | | | |
| 8th | Dante | 4th | 1st | 1st | 6th | 8th | | | | | |
| 9th | Geoff | 8th | 5th | 8th | 9th | | | | | | |
| 10th | Alyson | 9th | 2nd | 10th | | | | | | | |
| 11th | Kelly | 11th | 11th | | | | | | | | |
| 12th | JD | 10th | | | | | | | | | |

Episode Notes

^Note 1: In Episode 5 (Halo 3), Jamal chose Robert and Dante chose Mark to compete with them in the elimination challenge.
^Note 2: In Episode 7, the gamer who placed last amongst the competitors was automatically eliminated. In the third and final round, the gamers with the two lowest scores were eliminated.

This gamer won and became the WCG Ultimate Gamer.
This gamer won the challenge and got to pick who faced off against the lowest scorer in the elimination round.
This gamer won the challenge and voluntarily faced off against the lowest scorer in the elimination round.
This gamer won the head-to-head elimination round, thus saving themselves from being eliminated.
This gamer did not win the challenge, but did not go into the elimination round.
This gamer lost the head-to-head elimination round, thus they were eliminated.

=== Episodes ===
==== Episode 1: Are You Ready to Rock? ====
Airdate: March 10, 2009

- Game: Rock Band 2
- Real Life Challenge: The contestants performed The Donnas' "New Kid in School" live at The Music Box Theater in Hollywood.
  - Judges: The Donnas
  - Teams:

- "Pandora Rox" (Robert, Amy, Alyson and Kelly)
- "Pirates VS Ninjas" (Mark, Jamal, Swoozie and Chelsea)
- "Napalm in the Morning" (Geoff, Ciji, Dante and JD)

- Winner: "Pirates VS Ninjas"
- Prize: Ion Drum Rocker Premium Drum Set

- Isolation Challenge: The contestants performed Lit's "My Own Worst Enemy" on Rock Band 2.
  - Teams:
    - Green Band: Mark, JD, Kelly and Robert
    - Red Band: Jamal, Dante, Swoozie and Amy
    - Blue Band: Alyson, Chelsea, Geoff and Ciji
- Challenge Results:

| Contestant | Real Life | Isolation | Overall |
| Swoozie | 1st | 1st | 1st |
| Jamal | 1st | 3rd | 2nd |
| Chelsea | 1st | 6th | 3rd |
| Dante | 2nd | 4th | 4th |
| Ciji | 2nd | 5th | 5th |
| Mark | 1st | 9th | 6th |
| Amy | 3rd | 2nd | 7th |
| Geoff | 2nd | 8th | 8th |
| Alyson | 3rd | 7th | 9th |
| JD | 2nd | 12th | 10th |
| Kelly | 3rd | 10th | 11th |
| Robert | 3rd | 11th | 12th |

- Elimination Challenge: The two gamers performed The Offspring's "Come Out And Play" in a head-to-head battle in Rock Band 2.
  - Winner: Robert
  - Loser: JD

==== Episode 2: Kicking and Screaming ====
Airdate: March 17, 2009'

- Game: Virtua Fighter 5
- Real Life Challenge: The contestants completed a combat course in which teams must break every single board throughout the maze in order to score.
  - Judge: Master Lew
  - Teams:
    - Black Team (Alyson, Amy, Robert, Ciji, Dante and Kelly)
    - Red Team (Mark, Chelsea, Geoff, Swoozie and Jamal)
  - Winner: Red Team
  - Individual Winner: Geoff
    - Prize: Geoff received a personal one-on-one training session with Adnan Rana, reigning U.S. WCG Virtua Fighter 5 champion.
- Isolation Challenge: The contestants could choose any Virtua Fighter 5 character and tried to defeat as many enemies as possible.
- Challenge Results:

| Contestant | Real Life | Isolation | Overall |
| Dante | 2nd | 1st | 1st |
| Alyson | 2nd | 2nd | 2nd |
| Swoozie | 1st | 3rd | 3rd |
| Jamal | 1st | 4th | 4th |
| Geoff | 1st | 6th | 5th |
| Mark | 1st | 7th | 6th |
| Chelsea | 1st | 9th | 7th |
| Robert | 2nd | 5th | 8th |
| Ciji | 2nd | 8th | 9th |
| Amy | 2nd | 10th | 10th |
| Kelly | 2nd | 11th | 11th |

- Elimination Challenge: The two gamers played a head-to-head match. The first to win five rounds wins the elimination challenge.
  - Winner: Amy
  - Loser: Kelly

==== Episode 3: Shut Up and Drive ====
Airdate: March 24, 2009

- Game: Project Gotham Racing 4
- Real Life Challenge: The contestants were required to drift through an obstacle course where a still camera will take shots of the cars, which have colored lights mounted on the front and the rear.
  - Judge: Chris Forsberg
  - Teams:
    - Mark and Ciji
    - Geoff and Dante
    - Jamal and Amy
    - Swoozie and Chelsea
    - Alyson and Robert
  - Winner: Mark and Ciji
    - Prize: Mark and Ciji won a training session with Brian Boyle, reigning U.S. WCG Project Gotham Racing 4 champion.
- Isolation Challenge: The gamers must complete four laps around NYC's Park Row in Project Gotham Racing 4 driving a Lotus Exige GT3. The contestant's best lap time counted as their score.
- Challenge Results:

| Contestant | Real Life | Isolation | Overall |
| Dante | 2nd | 1st | 1st |
| Ciji | 1st | 5th | 2nd |
| Robert | 4th | 2nd | 3rd |
| Jamal | 3rd | 4th | 4th |
| Mark | 1st | 8th | 5th |
| Amy | 3rd | 6th | 6th |
| Swoozie | 5th | 3rd | 7th |
| Geoff | 2nd | 10th | 8th |
| Chelsea | 5th | 7th | 9th |
| Alyson | 4th | 9th | 10th |

- Elimination Challenge: The gamers played a three-lap race around London's Westminster route.
  - Winner: Jamal
  - Loser: Alyson

==== Episode 4: Move It or Lose It ====
Airdate: March 31, 2009

- Game: Dance Dance Revolution Universe 3
- Real Life Challenge: The contestants danced in a nightclub in front of a panel of judges.
  - Judge: So You Think You Can Dance choreographer Tyce Diorio.
    - Round 1: Three contestants go up at once and dance to a song. One from each group will move on.
      - First Group: Mark, Swoozie and Ciji
        - Winner: Swoozie
      - Second Group: Dante, Geoff and Jamal
        - Winner: Jamal
      - Third Group: Chelsea, Robert and Amy
        - Winner: Robert
      - Round 2: The three winners of the previous rounds all danced to a techno, disco, and salsa song.
        - Winner: Swoozie
    - Prize: Swoozie received a Samsung Eternity phone, which he can use to call one person from home.
- Isolation Challenge: The gamers used a four-panel dance pad in single-player mode while dancing to Master Source's Feel the Beat.
- Challenge Results:

| Contestant | Real Life | Isolation | Overall |
| Swoozie | 1st | 2nd | 1st |
| Robert | 3rd | 1st | 2nd |
| Jamal | 2nd | 5th | 3rd |
| Chelsea | 4th | 3rd | 4th |
| Ciji | 4th | 4th | 5th |
| Dante | 4th | 6th | 6th |
| Mark | 4th | 7th | 7th |
| Amy | 4th | 8th | 8th |
| Geoff | 4th | 9th | 9th |

- Elimination Challenge: The two gamers played on Difficult level while dancing to Jamiroquai's Canned Heat.
  - Winner: Swoozie
  - Loser: Geoff

==== Episode 5: Things Get Explosive ====
Airdate: April 7, 2009

- Game: Halo 3
- Real Life Challenge: Round 1 was a realistic paintball elimination round where the objective was to reach the enemy's elevator. Round 2 was a real life version of team assault, where each team had to retrieve a bomb using snares through a fenced-off area and then crack a code which allowed the team to set and detonate a bomb in the other team's base.
  - Teams:
    - Red Team: Swoozie, Robert, Jamal, and Dante
    - Blue Team: Chelsea, Amy, Ciji, and Mark

- Winner: Blue Team
- Prize: Chelsea, Amy, Ciji, and Mark won a coaching lesson with WCG Halo 3 champion team Mob Deep.

- Isolation Challenge: The contestants played a four-on-four team slayer match, where each team attempts to get the greatest amount of kills.
- Challenge Results:

| Contestant | Real Life | Isolation | Overall |
| Mark | 1st | 1st | 1st |
| Robert | 2nd | 2nd | 2nd |
| Amy | 1st | 6th | 3rd |
| Jamal | 2nd | 3rd | 4th |
| Chelsea | 1st | 7th | 5th |
| Swoozie | 2nd | 4th | 6th |
| Ciji | 1st | 8th | 7th |
| Dante | 2nd | 5th | 8th |

- Elimination Challenge: The two gamers played a two vs. two assault match, where each player at risk chose who their partner will be (this partner is not at risk of elimination).
  - Winner: Jamal
    - Jamal had first choice of partner, and chose Robert.
  - Loser: Dante
    - Dante had second choice of partner, and chose Mark.

==== Episode 6: Sink Or Swim ====
Airdate: April 14, 2009

- Game: NBA Live 09
- Real Life Challenge: The contestants had to obtain the highest score in a three-round slam dunk contest using a diving board to jump to the hoop suspended over a swimming pool.
  - Judges: NBA Slam Dunk Champion Spud Webb, Three-Time NBA Finalist Darryl Dawkins, and Four-Time Olympic Gold Medalist Lisa Leslie
  - Winner: Swoozie
    - Prize: Swoozie won two tickets to an Orlando Magic game and a basketball autographed by the judges.
- Isolation Challenge: The gamers played two quarters as the Los Angeles Lakers against the CPU-controlled Houston Rockets.
- Challenge Results:

| Contestant | Real Life | Isolation | Overall |
| Mark | 3rd | 1st | 1st |
| Swoozie | 1st | 5th | 2nd |
| Amy | 4th | 4th | 3rd |
| Chelsea | 2nd | 6th | 4th |
| Jamal | 7th | 1st | 5th |
| Robert | 6th | 3rd | 6th |
| Ciji | 5th | 7th | 7th |

- Note: This is the first time there was a tie in an Isolation Challenge.
- Elimination Challenge: The two gamers played a full four-quarter game, with each quarter lasting two minutes.
  - Winner: Mark
  - Loser: Ciji

==== Episode 7: The Gauntlet ====
Airdate: April 21, 2009

- Games: Asphalt 4, Project Gotham Racing 4, Rock Band 2, Halo 3
- Mobile Challenge: The contestants played a three-lap race in Asphalt 4 using Bluetooth. The two players with the fastest times then competed head-to-head.
  - Winner: Jamal
    - Prize: Jamal earned a copy of every game played in the competition so far.
- Gauntlet Challenge 1: The contestants were required to complete three laps around Quebec's Rampart Run in Project Gotham Racing 4 while seated in an upside down racing rig. The contestant who finished in last place was automatically eliminated.
- Challenge Results:

| Contestant | Result |
| Jamal | 1st |
| Swoozie | 2nd |
| Robert | 3rd |
| Mark | 4th |
| Amy | 5th |
| Chelsea | 6th |

- Gauntlet Challenge 2: The contestants were required to perform Survivor's Eye of the Tiger in Rock Band 2 on both the guitar and the drum simultaneously. The percentages on each individual instrument were combined to give an overall score. The contestant who earned the lowest score was automatically eliminated. As the winner of the previous challenge, Jamal was able to limit Mark to only one practice round before the competition, while each of the other competitors were allowed two practice rounds.
- Challenge Results:

| Contestant | Result |
| Swoozie | 1st |
| Robert | 2nd |
| Jamal | 3rd |
| Mark | 4th |
| Amy | 5th |

- Gauntlet Challenge 3: Contestants played Slayer Free-for-all at Last Resort in Halo 3 for 9 consecutive hours while standing on a pedestal. The total kill count made up the contestant's final score. The contestants with the two lowest scores were eliminated. As the winner of the previous challenge, Swoozie was given five minutes to accumulate kills with the other players standing defenseless. During the challenge, the players were tempted to leave their pedestals to eat pizza and fresh-baked chocolate chip cookies or to claim $1,000. Swoozie took advantage of the pizza and cookies, and Jamal went for the cash. Mark took advantage of Jamal's absence to visit the restroom.
- Challenge Results:

| Contestant | Result |
| Robert | 1st |
| Mark | 2nd |
| Jamal | 3rd |
| Swoozie | 4th |

==== Episode 8: The Ultimate Showdown ====
Airdate: April 28, 2009

- Games: Shaun White Snowboarding, Gears of War 2, Soulcalibur IV
- Final Challenge 1: In Shaun White Snowboarding, the finalists played King of the Hill. The gamer with the highest score wins the round and earns one point towards their final score.
- Final Challenge 2: In Gears of War 2, the gamers played a standard "Execution" deathmatch. The first gamer to win five rounds receives two points towards their final score.
- Final Challenge 3: In Soulcalibur IV, the players fought a head-to-head battle on the Imperial Garden stage over a possible 9 rounds. The first gamer to win five rounds wins three points towards their final score.

| Contestant | Shaun White Snowboarding | Gears of War 2 | Soul Calibur 4 | Total |
|---|---|---|---|---|
| Mark | check | X mark | check | 4 |
| Robert | X mark | check | X mark | 2 |

WCG Season One Ultimate Gamer: Mark Alan Smith II

Mark stated that he, in large part, attributed his success to the embodiment of the confidence and tenacity he learned in observing his father over the years.

== Season 2 ==
=== Contestants ===
| Contestant | Alias | Game Specialty | Accomplishments |
|---|---|---|---|
| Anthony "AJ" Mazur | HatPerson | Rhythm | Up for Rock Band World Record |
| Caesar Noriega | CDN the 3rd | Shooters | Top 8 Finalist, Gears of War |
| Faye Mata | Princess Aura | Fighting | Regional champion, Super Smash Bros. Brawl; Multiple Local Tournament Titles. |
| Jake Pfister | Thirstee321 | Racing | Multiple Local Tournament Titles in 3 Genres |
| Justin Wong | JWong | Fighting | 6-time World Champion, Marvel vs. Capcom 2; National Street Fighter IV champion |
| Katherine "Kat" Gunn | III Mystik III | Shooters | National Champion, Dead or Alive 4; Top 12 Finalist, Halo WCG Ultimate Gamer |
| Mike Labelle | michs09, Dirty Mike | Sports | 3-Time WCG National Finalist, FIFA series |
| Rachel Quirico | PMS Seltzer | Shooters | Multiple 1st Place Finishes, Team Fortress 2 |
| Ryan Burnett | I RyBu I | Rhythm | Multiple Local Tournament Titles, Street Fighter IV |
| Sebastian Burton | o CHOSEN1 o | Sports | National Finalist, Madden NFL; Top 3 at over 50 tournaments |
| Vanessa Arteaga | Vanessa | Fighting | WCG Pan-American Champion in Dead or Alive 4 |
| Yazan "Yaz" Ammari | yaz the clowN | Shooters | World Champion, Counter-Strike: Source |

=== Contestant Progress ===
| Rank | Contestant | Ep 1 | Ep 2 | Ep 3 | Ep 4 | Ep 5^{1} | Ep 6 | Ep 7^{2} | | Ep 8 | | |
|---|---|---|---|---|---|---|---|---|---|---|---|---|
| 1st | Kat | 8th | 7th | 4th | 3rd | 2nd | 6th | 5th | 1st | 2nd | 1st | 1st |
| 2nd | Yaz | 1st | 6th | 10th | 1st | 1st | 4th | 3rd | 4th | 1st | 1st | 2nd |
| 3rd | Caesar | 5th | 3rd | 7th | 4th | 7th | 1st | 4th | 3rd | 3rd | 3rd | |
| 4th | Jake | 4th | 1st | 1st | 2nd | 3rd | 2nd | 2nd | 2nd | 4th | | |
| 5th | Justin | 3rd | 8th | 2nd | 7th | 6th | 5th | 1st | 5th | | | |
| 6th | Rachel | 7th | 9th | 6th | 8th | 4th | 3rd | 6th | | | | |
| 7th | Faye | 10th | 10th | 8th | 6th | 5th | 7th | | | | | |
| 8th | Ryan | 2nd | 5th | 5th | 5th | 8th | | | | | | |
| 9th | Vanessa | 6th | 4th | 3rd | 9th | | | | | | | |
| 10th | Sebastian | 11th | 11th | 9th | | | | | | | | |
| 11th | AJ | 9th | 2nd | | | | | | | | | |
| 12th | Mike | 12th | | | | | | | | | | |

Episode Notes

^Note 1: In Episode 5 (Battlefield: Bad Company 2), Caesar chose Yaz and Ryan chose Kat to compete with them in the elimination challenge.
^Note 2: From Episode 7 to the finale, the gamer who placed last amongst the competitors in the game(s) was automatically eliminated.

This gamer won and became the WCG Ultimate Gamer.
This gamer won the challenge and got to pick who faced off against the lowest scorer in the elimination round.
This gamer won the head-to-head elimination round, thus saving themselves from being eliminated.
This gamer did not win the challenge, but did not go into the elimination round.
This gamer lost the head-to-head elimination round, thus they were eliminated.

=== Episodes ===
==== Episode 1: Coming Out Swinging ====
Airdate: August 19, 2010

- Game: Tekken 6
- Real Life Challenge: The contestants battled in a team of six in midair with four people controlling wire ropes to maneuver their "fighter". The "fighter" tries to grab orbs stuck to their opponent's suit and throw them down to their "catcher", a teammate holding a basket. Green and purple orbs were worth one point. Orange orbs were worth two points.
  - Judge: Kelly Hu
  - Teams:

- Green Team (Faye, Sebastian, AJ, Kat, Rachel and Mike)
- Purple Team (Jake, Yaz, Caesar, Ryan, Justin and Vanessa)

- Winner: Purple Team
- Individual Winner: Yaz
- Prize: Yaz received a HORI Real Arcade Pro EX Fight Stick.

- Isolation Challenge: The contestants played Survival mode in Tekken 6, which involved defeating the most opponents possible.
- Challenge Results:

| Contestant | Real Life | Isolation | Overall |
| Yaz | 1st | 1st | 1st |
| Ryan | 1st | 2nd | 2nd |
| Justin | 1st | 3rd | 3rd |
| Jake | 1st | 5th | 4th |
| Caesar | 1st | 6th | 5th |
| Vanessa | 1st | 7th | 6th |
| Rachel | 2nd | 4th | 7th |
| Kat | 2nd | 8th | 8th |
| AJ | 2nd | 9th | 9th |
| Faye | 2nd | 10th | 10th |
| Sebastian | 2nd | 11th | 11th |
| Mike | 2nd | 12th | 12th |

- Elimination Challenge: The two gamers fought a one-on-one Tekken showdown. The first player to win five rounds wins the match.
  - Winner: Kat
  - Loser: Mike

==== Episode 2: Making Waves ====
Airdate: August 26, 2010

- Games: Hyperspace, Wii Sports Resort, Mario Kart Wii
- Mobile Challenge: The contestants were challenged to a game of Hyperspace, where they must keep a ball from rolling off the playing surface and cross the finish line at the end of each level.
  - Winner: AJ
    - Prize: AJ automatically received first place in the Real Life Challenge and did not need to participate in it.
- Real Life Challenge: The contestants were split into pairs for this challenge. While one person surfed on the FlowRider, the other person had to throw beach balls and water polo balls at their teammate's head. For every ball that hit the surfer's head, the team gained points. Water polo balls were worth five points and beach balls were worth ten points. There were also a few "money balls" at the end of each rack that were worth 25 points.
  - Teams:
    - Rachel and Faye
    - Justin and Kat
    - Sebastian and Vanessa
    - Ryan and Caesar
    - Jake and Yaz

- Winner: Ryan and Caesar
- Prize: Caesar and Ryan each won a Nintendo prize package, including a Wii console, Wii Sports Resort and Super Mario Galaxy 2.

- Isolation Challenge: The contestants had to score as many points as possible in the Wii Sports Resort 3-point basketball challenge.
- Challenge Results:

| Contestant | Real Life | Isolation | Overall |
| Jake | 3rd | 2nd | 1st |
| AJ | 1st | 3rd | 2nd |
| Caesar | 2nd | 4th | 3rd |
| Vanessa | 6th | 1st | 4th |
| Ryan | 2nd | 9th | 5th |
| Yaz | 3rd | 5th | 6th |
| Kat | 4th | 7th | 7th |
| Justin | 4th | 7th | 8th |
| Rachel | 5th | 5th | 9th |
| Faye | 5th | 11th | 10th |
| Sebastian | 6th | 10th | 11th |

- Elimination Challenge: The two gamers competed in a series of three races in Mario Kart Wii using the Wii Wheel accessory. The first player to take two races wins the match.
  - Winner: Sebastian
  - Loser: AJ

==== Episode 3: On Thin Ice ====
Airdate: September 2, 2010

- Game: NHL 10
- Real Life Challenge: The contestants were divided into pairs of two. In the first round, each team member would have a turn as both the "puck" and the "shooter". The "shooter" was responsible for aiming and launching the human "puck" at the goal at the other end of the ice rink using a giant slingshot. If the "puck" passed through the goal, then the team earned 10 points. The human "puck" also had a chance to score extra points by throwing four bonus hockey pucks into two different nets, located along the sides of the arena, as they sailed across the ice. These bonus pucks were worth four points each. After the first round, the two highest scoring teams moved on to the second round.
  - Teams:
    - Gold Team: Rachel and Vanessa
    - Green Team: Justin and Kat
    - Red Team: Jake and Ryan
    - Blue Team: Faye and Yaz
    - Navy Team: Sebastian and Caesar

- Winner: Red Team
- Prize: Jake and Ryan each won a copy of NHL 11.

- Isolation Challenge: The contestants played as the Pittsburgh Penguins against the CPU-controlled Colorado Avalanche in NHL 10. The goal was to score one goal in the least amount of time possible. If the gamer could not score within four minutes, then their score was based on the amount of time they had controlling the hockey puck.
- Challenge Results:

| Contestant | Real Life | Isolation | Overall |
| Jake | 1st | 3rd | 1st |
| Justin | 2nd | 2nd | 2nd |
| Vanessa | 3rd | 1st | 3rd |
| Kat | 2nd | 4th | 4th |
| Ryan | 1st | 9th | 5th |
| Rachel | 3rd | 8th | 6th |
| Caesar | 4th | 5th | 7th |
| Faye | 4th | 6th | 8th |
| Sebastian | 4th | 7th | 9th |
| Yaz | 4th | 10th | 10th |

- Elimination Challenge: The two gamers competed head-to-head for the Stanley Cup. The player with the most points after three four-minute periods wins. If the score is tied, the players will participate in a penalty shootout.
  - Winner: Yaz
  - Loser: Sebastian

==== Episode 4: Blind Sided ====
Airdate: September 9, 2010

- Game: Forza Motorsport 3
- Real Life Challenge: The contestants competed in a timed race around an obstacle course. However, the cabin of the contestants' car was blacked out. Instead, a Samsung U20 Camcorder was attached to the trunk of the car. The driver had to rely on an eight-inch monitor behind the steering wheel, which provided a panoramic view of the course taken from the camcorder - simulating a racing video game. Cutouts of the nine remaining contestants were randomly placed around the track. Before each contestant stepped into the car, they chose one fellow gamer's cutout to hit along the way. If the driver was able to hit that contestant's cutout, then 15 seconds was taken off their time. The gamer that got called out the most was given a one-minute penalty added to their total time. The other cutouts, along with the barrels outlining the course, also acted as penalties. Five seconds were added to the contestant's total time for each one they hit.

- Winner: Yaz
- Prize: Yaz received a Samsung U20 Camcorder.

- Isolation Challenge: The contestants drove four laps around the Amalfi Coast in Forza Motorsport 3. The contestant's fastest lap time counted as their score.
- Challenge Results:

| Contestant | Real Life | Isolation | Overall |
| Yaz | 1st | 2nd | 1st |
| Jake | 2nd | 3rd | 2nd |
| Kat | 6th | 1st | 3rd |
| Caesar | 3rd | 6th | 4th |
| Ryan | 4th | 7th | 5th |
| Faye | 8th | 4th | 6th |
| Justin | 7th | 5th | 7th |
| Rachel | 5th | 9th | 8th |
| Vanessa | 9th | 8th | 9th |

- Elimination Challenge: The gamers played a three-lap race around Japan's Suzuka Circuit West circuit. The first contestant to cross the finish line after five laps wins.
  - Winner: Rachel
  - Loser: Vanessa

==== Episode 5: In the Crosshairs ====
Airdate: September 16, 2010

- Game: Battlefield: Bad Company 2
- Real Life Challenge: The contestants were separated into two teams. Each squad took turns attacking the other squad's base. Within the base were three "M-COM" stations, each containing a unique puzzle that the attacking squad needed to solve within eight minutes. If time expired, then the squad moved on to the next station. Three members of the attacking squad also had to pick a specialist role: recon, engineer, or medic. These specialists were responsible for solving their assigned puzzles at each station. While the attacking team moved through the base, the defending team had to slow down the opposing team's progress by shooting them with paintball guns. Next to each "M-COM" station was one piece of a satellite up-link device. The attacking squad needed to take the pieces, whether they completed the puzzles at each station within the time limit or not, bring them to the finish line, and assemble it. Once the satellite up-link was set up, the clock was stopped.
  - Teams:
    - Alpha Squad: Yaz, Justin, Jake, and Kat
    - Bravo Squad: Caesar, Ryan, Rachel, and Faye

- Winner: Alpha Squad
- Prize: The members of Alpha Squad each won a copy of Medal of Honor.

- Isolation Challenge: The contestants played a four-on-four Squad Rush match in Battlefield: Bad Company 2 for the PC.
- Challenge Results:

| Contestant | Real Life | Isolation | Overall |
| Yaz | 1st | 1st | 1st |
| Kat | 1st | 2nd | 2nd |
| Jake | 1st | 6th | 3rd |
| Rachel | 2nd | 3rd | 4th |
| Faye | 2nd | 4th | 5th |
| Justin | 1st | 8th | 6th |
| Caesar | 2nd | 5th | 7th |
| Ryan | 2nd | 7th | 8th |

- Elimination Challenge: The two gamers played a two-on-two Squad Deathmatch, where each player at risk chose who their partner would be (this partner was not at risk of elimination). The first team to score 15 kills wins.
  - Winner: Caesar
    - Caesar had first choice of partner, and chose Yaz.
    - Final Score: 15
  - Loser: Ryan
    - Ryan had second choice of partner, and chose Kat.
    - Final Score: 14

==== Episode 6: Climbing the Walls ====
Airdate: September 23, 2010

- Game: WWE SmackDown vs. Raw 2010
- Mobile Challenge: The contestants were challenged to a game of Mini Shot Basketball. The player with the highest score after 45 second wins the challenge.

- Winner: Yaz received a pass in the first round of the Real Life challenge, and also got to call someone from home.

- Real Life Challenge: The players were brought to a warehouse housing a rock climbing tower. The contestants were sorted into tournament style brackets based on their performance in the previous night's Mobile Challenge. The contestants had to race up the rock climbing wall and grab the wrestling belt suspended above to proceed further in the brackets. The second round randomly matched the winners from the first round to create new match-ups. The second round also introduced bags that the contestants could drop on their opponents while climbing. The two winners of the second round then were allowed to place flags on the grips on their opponent's wall, disallowing them from being used.

- Winner: Caesar
- Prize: Caesar received a copy of WWE SmackDown vs. Raw 2011 and the WCG Ultimate Gamer championship belt used in the Real Life Challenge.

- Isolation Challenge: The contestants played a royal rumble match. Their score was determined by the number of opponents they threw out of the wrestling ring within the time limit.
- Challenge Results:

| Contestant | Real Life | Isolation | Overall |
| Caesar | 1st | 5th | 1st |
| Jake | 3rd | 3rd | 2nd |
| Rachel | 3rd | 4th | 3rd |
| Yaz | 2nd | 6th | 4th |
| Justin | 7th | 1st | 5th |
| Kat | 7th | 2nd | 6th |
| Faye | 7th | 7th | 7th |

- Elimination Challenge: The two gamers played a classic ladder match, where they had to set up a ladder, climb it, and grab the briefcase hanging above the ring. The player that holds onto the briefcase long enough for the meter to empty wins.
  - Winner: Kat
  - Loser: Faye

==== Episode 7: The Gauntlet ====
Airdate: September 30, 2010

- Games: Invincible Tiger: The Legend of Han Tao, Pac-Man, Forza Motorsport 3, Splinter Cell: Conviction
- Challenge: Get the highest score in Invincible Tiger: The Legend of Han Tao using 3D glasses.
  - Winner: Jake
    - Prize: An extra credit for the first Gauntlet Challenge
- Gauntlet Challenge 1: Obtain the highest score in the arcade version of Pac-Man.
- Challenge Results:

| Contestant | Result |
| Justin | 1st |
| Jake | 2nd |
| Yaz | 3rd |
| Caesar | 4th |
| Kat | 5th |
| Rachel | 6th |

- Gauntlet Challenge 2: Playing two consecutive 20 minute races on Forza Motorsport 3. The first match has the player's handcuffed to the steering wheel behind them. The second match put the players in a straitjacket, where they must determine the best way to control the game. Rankings are determined by the total distance travelled in both matches.
- Challenge Results:

| Contestant | Result |
| Kat | 1st |
| Jake | 2nd |
| Caesar | 3rd |
| Yaz | 4th |
| Justin | 5th |

==== Episode 8: The Grand Final ====
Airdate: October 7, 2010

- Games: Splinter Cell: Conviction, Tron: Evolution, Green Day: Rock Band, BlazBlue: Continuum Shift, Halo: Reach
- Gauntlet Challenge 3: Players had to play the Last Stand mode on Splinter Cell: Conviction, viewing the game via the reflection on a mirror which would randomly rotate. The first to score 10 kills within each round would progress. The challenge began in episode 7 and was concluded at the beginning of episode 8.
- Challenge Results:

| Contestant | Result |
| Yaz | 1st |
| Kat | 2nd |
| Caesar | 3rd |
| Jake | 4th |

- Challenge: 15 minute deathmatch on the upcoming Tron: Evolution. The player with the lowest 'de-rezes' at the end of the game is eliminated.

| Contestant | Result |
| Yaz | 1st |
| Kat | 1st |
| Caesar | 3rd |

- Final Challenge 1: In Green Day: Rock Band, the finalists played a head-to-head drum battle on the song "American Idiot" set to expert difficulty in score duel mode. The player with the highest score wins the round and earns one point towards their final score.
  - Winner: Yaz
- Final Challenge 2: In BlazBlue: Continuum Shift, the finalists fought a one-on-one match. The first contestant to win five rounds received two points towards their final score.
  - Winner: Kat
- Final Challenge 3: In Halo: Reach, the finalists played a one-on-one slayer match. The first gamer to achieve fifteen kills received three points.
  - Winner: Kat

| Contestant | Green Day: Rock Band | BlazBlue: Continuum Shift | Halo: Reach | Total |
|---|---|---|---|---|
| Yaz | check | X mark | X mark | 1 |
| Kat | X mark | check | check | 5 |

- WCG Ultimate Gamer: Kat
