= American Teenage Rock 'n' Roll Machine =

Studio album by The Donnas
- Released: January 27, 1998
- Studios: Trainwreck Studios; Oakland, California
- Genre: Punk rock
- Length: 24:23
- Label: Lookout!
- Producers: The Donnas; Romeo Voltage

The Donnas chronology
The Donnas (1997)	American Teenage Rock 'n' Roll Machine (1998)	Get Skintight (1999)

Professional ratings
Review scores
Source	Rating
AllMusic	3/5 stars
Christgau's Consumer Guide	(neither)
Pitchfork	6.8/10
The Rolling Stone Album Guide	2/5 stars
Spin	8/10

American Teenage Rock 'n' Roll Machine is the second studio album by American rock band The Donnas, released in 1998 on Lookout!.

As of 2005 it has sold 32,000 units in United States according to Nielsen SoundScan.

== Track listing ==
all songs by The Donnas

1. "Rock 'n' Roll Machine" – 2:53
2. "You Make Me Hot" – 2:20
3. "Checkin' It Out" – 3:13
4. "Gimmie My Radio" – 2:09
5. "Outta My Mind" – 2:15
6. "Looking for Blood" – 1:54
7. "Leather on Leather" – 2:17
8. "Wanna Get Some Stuff" – 2:18
9. "Speed Demon" – 2:01
10. "Shake in the Action" – 3:03

== Personnel ==
- Donna A. – lead vocals
- Donna R. – guitars, backing vocals
- Donna F. – bass
- Donna C. – drums, percussion, backing vocals

== Production ==
- Producer: The Donnas, Romeo Voltage
- Layout Design: C. Sterling Imlay
