= Spend the Night (The Donnas album) =

Studio album by The Donnas
- Released: October 22, 2002
- Length: 39:52
- Label: Atlantic
- Producers: Jason Carmer, Robert Shimp (record producers); David Anthony, Gloria Gabriel (DVD producers)

The Donnas chronology
The Donnas Turn 21 (2001)	Spend the Night (2002)	Gold Medal (2004)

Singles from Spend the Night
- 1. "Take It Off" Released: November 18, 2002; 2. "Who Invited You" Released: March 17, 2003; 3. "Too Bad About Your Girl" Released: August 4, 2003

Professional ratings
Aggregate scores
Source	Rating
Metacritic	74/100
Review scores
Source	Rating
AllMusic	4/5 stars
Alternative Press	4.5/5 stars
Blender	4/5 stars
Entertainment Weekly	B
Los Angeles Times	3/4 stars
Pitchfork	2.9/10
Q	4/5 stars
Rolling Stone	3/5 stars
Uncut	3/5 stars
The Village Voice	A−

Spend the Night is the fifth studio album and major label debut by the American hard rock band the Donnas, released in 2002 on Atlantic Records. It was the band's first charting record on the Billboard 200, peaking at number 62, and features their most successful single, "Take It Off", which peaked at No. 17 on the Billboard Modern Rock Tracks chart and the top 40 of the UK Singles Chart.

In November 2016, Cherry Red Records re-released the album to feature six bonus tracks, which consists of B-sides and songs from previous albums.

As of 2005, it has sold 450,000 units in United States according to Nielsen SoundScan.

== Track listing ==
All tracks are written by Brett Anderson, Torry Castellano, Maya Ford and Allison Robertson.

No.	Title	Length
1.	"It's on the Rocks"	2:54
2.	"Take It Off"	2:40
3.	"Who Invited You"	3:30
4.	"All Messed Up"	3:11
5.	"Dirty Denim"	3:26
6.	"You Wanna Get Me High"	2:55
7.	"I Don't Care (So There)"	2:47
8.	"Pass It Around"	3:27
9.	"Too Bad About Your Girl"	2:50
10.	"Not the One"	2:46
11.	"Please Don't Tease"	2:51
12.	"Take Me to the Backseat"	2:22
13.	"5 O'Clock in the Morning"	4:13
Total length:		39:52

International bonus track
No.	Title	Length
14.	"Big Rig"

Japanese bonus track
No.	Title	Length
15.	"Backstage"

2016 Re-release
No.	Title	Length
1.	"It's on the Rocks"
2.	"Take It Off"
3.	"Who Invited You"
4.	"All Messed Up"
5.	"Dirty Denim"
6.	"You Wanna Get Me High"
7.	"I Don't Care (So There)"
8.	"Pass It Around"
9.	"Too Bad About Your Girl"
10.	"Not the One"
11.	"Big Rig" (international bonus track)
12.	"Please Don't Tease"
13.	"Take Me to the Backseat"
14.	"5 O'Clock in the Morning"
15.	"Hyperactive" (previously released on Get Skintight)
16.	"Rock'n'Roll Machine" (from Take It Off Single)
17.	"Mama's Boy" (from Who Invited You Single)
18.	"Play My Game" (previously released on Turn 21)
19.	"Backstage" (from Who Invited You Single)

== Personnel ==
The Donnas

- Brett Anderson – lead vocals
- Allison Robertson – guitars, backing vocals
- Maya Ford – bass
- Torry Castellano – drums, percussion, backing vocals

Additional personnel

- The Hellacopters – backing vocals

== Production ==
- Producer: Jason Carmer, Robert Shimp (Record)
- Producer: David Anthony, Gloria Gabriel (DVD)
- Engineers: Sean Beresford, Jason Carmer, Dime Assistant, Clint Roth, Robert Shimp
- Assistant engineers: Jesse Nichols, Michael Rosen
- Mixing: Chris Lord-Alge
- Mastering: Emily Lazar
- Assistant mastering engineer: Sarah Register
- Audio supervisor: Scott Smith
- A&R: Nick Casinelli, Mary Gormley
- Drum technician: Paul Revelli
- Art direction: Christina Dittmar
- Cover art concept: The Donnas
- Artwork: Stephen Stickler
- Photography: Stephen Stickler
- Cover photo: Stephen Stickler
- Direction: Popglory Art
- Camera operators: The Donnas, Tim Baker, Jackie Kelso
- Animation: Chris Becker
- Interviewer: Andy Dick
- Interviewee: The Donnas
- Model: Davy Newkirk

== Charts ==
Chart (2003)	Peak position
Australian Albums (ARIA Charts)	68
Billboard 200	62

== In popular culture ==
- The song "Take It Off" has been featured in the films Dodgeball: A True Underdog Story, The Hangover, and Guitar Hero (as a cover version by Wave Group Sound), and as a part of a 3-song downloadable pack via Xbox Live for the Xbox 360 version of Guitar Hero II. It appeared one more time in Guitar Hero Smash Hits. It was also featured in the Birds of Prey episode, "Gladiatrix". It was later released as DLC for Rock Band.
- "Who Invited You" was featured in EA Sports' MVP Baseball 2003, Splashdown: Rides Gone Wild, and True Crime: Streets of LA.
- "Who Invited You" was featured in the 2025 film Five Nights at Freddy's 2.
