= The Donnas Turn 21 =

Studio album by The Donnas
- Released: January 23, 2001
- Recorded: Toast Studios, San Francisco, CA
- Genre: Punk rock, hard rock
- Length: 40:56
- Label: Lookout!
- Producer: Robert Shimp

The Donnas chronology
Get Skintight (1999)	The Donnas Turn 21 (2001)	Spend the Night (2002)

Professional ratings
Aggregate scores
Source	Rating
Metacritic	71/100
Review scores
Source	Rating
AllMusic	3.5/5 stars
Alternative Press	4/5
Drowned in Sound	7/10
Entertainment Weekly	A−
Los Angeles Times	3/4 stars
NME	7/10
Pitchfork	4.9/10
Q	3/5 stars
Rolling Stone	3/5 stars
Spin	6/10

The Donnas Turn 21 is the fourth studio album by the American hard rock band The Donnas, released in 2001 on Lookout!. Their last release on Lookout!, the album marks their transition away from their previous pop punk sound and towards a more hard rock sound.

As of 2005 it has sold 65,000 units in United States according to Nielsen SoundScan.

== Track listing ==
All songs by Brett Anderson, Torry Castellano, Maya Ford and Allison Robertson, except where noted.

1. "Are You Gonna Move It For Me?" – 2:31
2. "Do You Wanna Hit It?" – 2:57
3. "40 Boys in 40 Nights" – 2:32
4. "Play My Game" – 3:02
5. "Midnite Snack" – 2:45
6. "Drivin' Thru My Heart" – 2:38
7. "You've Got a Crush on Me" – 2:30
8. "Little Boy" – 1:59
9. "Don't Get Me Busted" – 2:55
10. "Police Blitz" – 1:39
11. "Hot Pants" – 2:36
12. "Gimme a Ride" – 1:58
13. "Living After Midnight" (KK Downing, Rob Halford, Glenn Tipton) – 3:28
14. "Nothing to Do" – 7:26 (including hidden track)
15. "Drivin' Thru My Heart" (alternate version) (hidden track)

=== Japanese bonus track ===
16. "School's Out" (Alice Cooper, Michael Bruce, Glen Buxton, Dennis Dunaway, Neal Smith)

== Personnel ==
The Donnas

- Brett Anderson - lead vocals
- Allison Robertson - guitars, backing vocals
- Maya Ford - bass, backing vocals
- Torry Castellano - drums, percussion, backing vocals

Additional personnel

- Danny Sullivan - tambourine

== Production ==
- Producer: Robert Shimp
- Engineer: Robert Shimp
- Assistant Engineer: Aaron Prellwitz
- Mixing: Robert Shimp
- Editing: Clint Roth
- Artwork: Chris Appelgren

== Charts ==
Album

Year	Chart	Position
2001	Heatseekers	22
2001	Top Independent Albums	17
