= Get Skintight =

Studio album by The Donnas
- Released: June 8, 1999
- Recorded: Toast, San Francisco, California
- Genre: Punk rock
- Length: 38:06
- Label: Lookout!
- Producers: Jeff McDonald, Steve McDonald

The Donnas chronology
American Teenage Rock 'n' Roll Machine (1998)	Get Skintight (1999)	The Donnas Turn 21 (2001)

Professional ratings
Review scores
Source	Rating
AllMusic	4/5 stars
Entertainment Weekly	B
Los Angeles Times	3/4 stars
Kerrang!	4/5 stars
NME	7/10
Q	3/5 stars
Rolling Stone	3.5/5 stars
The Village Voice	A−

Get Skintight is the third studio album by the American rock band The Donnas, released in 1999 on Lookout!.

As of 2005 it has sold 58,000 units in United States according to Nielsen SoundScan.

== Track listing ==
All songs written by Brett Anderson, Torry Castellano, Maya Ford and Allison Robertson except as noted.

1. "Skintight" – 2:36
2. "Hyperactive" – 2:15
3. "You Don't Wanna Call" – 4:01
4. "Hook It Up" – 2:36
5. "Doin' Donuts" – 1:36
6. "Searching the Streets" – 2:58
7. "Party Action" – 2:22
8. "I Didn't Like You Anyway" – 3:57
9. "Get Outta My Room" – 2:21
10. "Well Done" – 2:35
11. "Get You Alone" – 2:21
12. "Hot Boxin'" – 2:31
13. "Too Fast for Love" (Nikki Sixx) – 3:29
14. "Zero" – 2:28

== Personnel ==
- Donna A. (Brett Anderson) – lead vocals
- Donna R. (Allison Robertson) – guitars, backing vocals
- Donna F. (Maya Ford) – bass
- Donna C. (Torry Castellano) – drums, percussion, backing vocals

== Production ==
- Producers: Jeff McDonald, Steve McDonald
- Engineer: Robert Shimp
- Mixing: The Donnas, Robert Shimp
- Mastering: John Golden
- Layout design: Chris Appelgren
