= The Donnas (album) =

Studio album by The Donnas
- Released: January 10, 1997
- Genre: Punk rock
- Length: 25:45
- Label: Super*Teem!; Lookout!

The Donnas chronology
The Donnas (1997)	American Teenage Rock 'n' Roll Machine (1998)

Professional ratings
Review scores
Source	Rating
AllMusic	4/5 stars
The Rolling Stone Album Guide	2/5 stars

The Donnas is the debut studio album by American rock band the Donnas, released in 1997, and re-released in 1998. The last nine tracks on the re-released version are bonus tracks; they are the nine tracks that were released on three singles prior to the original release of this album.

As of 2005, it has sold 25,000 units in the United States according to Nielsen SoundScan.

== Track listing ==
All songs written by Darin Rafaelli, Brett Anderson, Torry Castellano, Maya Ford, and Allison Robertson unless otherwise noted.

1. "Hey, I'm Gonna Be Your Girl" – 1:47
2. "Let's Go Mano!" – 1:18
3. "Teenage Runaway" – 1:55
4. "Lana & Stevie" – 1:31
5. "I'm Gonna Make Him Mine (Tonight)" – 2:39
6. "Huff All Night" – 1:44
7. "I Don't Wanna Go" – 1:30
8. "We Don't Go" – 2:28
9. "Friday Fun" – 1:56
10. "Everybody's Smoking Cheeba" – 2:10
11. "Get Rid of That Girl" – 1:40
12. "Drive In" (Mike Love, Brian Wilson) – 1:34
13. "Do You Wanna Go Out with Me" – 2:01
14. "Rock 'n' Roll Boy" – 1:32

=== Bonus tracks ===
15. "High School Yum Yum" – 1:26
16. "Boy Like You" – 1:29
17. "Let's Rab" – 1:09
18. "Let's Go Mano" [original version] – 1:22
19. "Last Chance Dance" – 2:06
20. "I Wanna Be a Unabomber" – 1:30
21. "Da Doo Ron Ron" (Jeff Barry, Ellie Greenwich, Phil Spector) – 1:26
22. "I Don't Want to Go to School" – 2:04
23. "I Don't Wanna Rock 'n' Roll Tonight" – 2:48

== Personnel ==
The Donnas

- Donna A. - lead vocals
- Donna R. - guitars, backing vocals
- Donna F. - bass, backing vocals
- Donna C. - drums, percussion
