= Asterix (disambiguation) =

Asterix is a French comic book series about ancient Gauls.

Asterix may also refer to:

== Computing, science and technology ==
- Asterisk, the * character
- ASTERIX, a European air traffic control standard
- Astérix (satellite), the first French satellite
- 29401 Asterix, an asteroid
- Trigonopterus asterix, a species of weevil

== Entertainment ==
- Asterix (character), a character in the comic
  - Asterix (1983 video game), Atari 2600 game based on the character
  - Asterix (1992 video game), Sega Master System game based on the character
  - Asterix (arcade game), 1992 game based on the character
  - Asterix (1993 video game), Nintendo Entertainment System game based on the character
- Parc Astérix, an amusement park near Paris

== Music ==
- Asterix, 1970 album by the German band Asterix which was later renamed to Lucifer's Friend
- Asterix (Indonesian band)

== Other uses ==
- Asterix (horse), a racehorse
- Asterix Kieldrecht, a Belgian women's volleyball club
- Asterix (tug), a tug operating at Fawley Refinery in Southampton Water
- MV Asterix, a former commercial container ship converted for use by the Royal Canadian Navy

== See also ==
- Asterisk (disambiguation)
- Asterixis, a medical condition
- Astrix (born 1981), Israeli psy-trance DJ and producer
- List of Asterix games
