= Bitchin' =

Studio album by The Donnas
- Released: September 18, 2007
- Recorded: Clear Lake Audio, North Hollywood, CA
- Length: 44:47
- Label: Purple Feather; RedEye
- Producer: Jay Ruston, The Donnas

The Donnas chronology
Gold Medal (2004)	Bitchin' (2007)	Greatest Hits Vol. 16 (2009)

Professional ratings
Aggregate scores
Source	Rating
Metacritic	54/100
Review scores
Source	Rating
AllMusic	3/5 stars
musicOMH	4/5 stars
Now	2/5 Ns
The Phoenix	2/4 stars
Pitchfork	4/10
PopMatters	4/10
Robert Christgau	(dud)
Rolling Stone	3/5 stars
Spin	4/10
Stylus Magazine	D

Bitchin' is the seventh and final studio album by the American hard rock band The Donnas, released in 2007 on their own label Purple Feather and released through RedEye. It is their first album since leaving Atlantic Records. The record was produced by Jay Ruston (Polyphonic Spree, Metal Skool, Meat Loaf) and The Donnas. Two of the tracks, "Wasted" and "Here for the Party", were co-written with songwriter Holly Knight ("Love Is a Battlefield", "Obsession", "The Warrior").

The iTunes bonus track, "New Kid in School", is featured in the game Rock Band 2.

The album was made available on CD, a double-purple vinyl, and as a digital download.

== Critical reception ==
Bitchin' was met with "mixed or average" reviews from critics. At Metacritic, which assigns a weighted average rating out of 100 to reviews from mainstream publications, this release received an average score of 54 based on 14 reviews.

In a review for AllMusic, critic reviewer Stephen Thomas Erlewine wrote: "The Donnas once rocked as if they were tanked to the gills but they now sound like they're playing with ferocious hangovers they just can't shake." At Billboard, Wes Orshoski noted the songs on the album are "too light on hooks" and "fail to balance irony, nasty shredding and big choruses." Evan Davies of Now said: "The foursome tend to write the same songs over and over again, this time thinly veiled in arena - and hair-metal swagger, but still too similar structurally to sound like they've challenged themselves."

Writing for Pitchfork, David Raposa said the release "sounds like a half-hearted compromise between what the group was and what the group wants to become."

== Track listing ==
All tracks are written by The Donnas, except where noted.

No.	Title	Writer(s)	Length
1.	"Bitchin'"		2:09
2.	"Don't Wait Up for Me"		3:27
3.	"Wasted"	The Donnas; Holly Knight	3:29
4.	"What Do I Have to Do"		3:07
5.	"Save Me"		3:14
6.	"Like an Animal"		2:42
7.	"Here for the Party"	The Donnas; Knight	2:54
8.	"Better off Dancing"		3:21
9.	"Love You Till It Hurts"		3:32
10.	"Smoke You Out"		3:22
11.	"Girl Talk"		3:14
12.	"Give Me What I Want"		3:13
13.	"Tonight's Alright"		3:16
14.	"When the Show Is Over"		3:43
Total length:			44:40

Bonus tracks
No.	Title	Writer(s)	Length
15.	"Randi" (Wal-Mart downloadable bonus track)	Ivan Doroschuk	2:39
16.	"The Safety Dance" (vinyl bonus track)		2:26
17.	"We Own the Night" (UK bonus track)		2:49
18.	"Can't Keep It a Secret" (Japanese bonus track)		2:52
19.	"New Kid in School" (iTunes bonus track)		3:36
20.	"She's Out of Control" (unreleased track)		2:33

== Singles ==
- "Don't Wait Up For Me", released in August 2007.

== Charts ==
Chart performance for Bitchin'
Chart (2007)	Peak position
Japanese Albums (Oricon)	177
US Billboard 200	89
US Independent Albums (Billboard)	9

== Personnel ==
Band members

- Brett Anderson – lead vocals
- Allison Robertson – guitars, backing vocals
- Maya Ford – bass, backing vocals
- Torry Castellano – drums, percussion, backing vocals

Additional musicians

- Holly Knight − vocals
- Joey Minkes – harmonica on "Here for the Party"

Production

- Jay Ruston – production, engineering, mixing
- Bruce Witkin – engineering
