= New Kid in School =

New Kid in School may refer to:

- "New Kid in School", a song from the 2007 album Bitchin' by the American hard rock band The Donnas
- "New Kid in School", a season 1 episode of Hannah Montana
