= Astaire =

Astaire may refer to:

== People ==
- Adele Astaire (1896–1981), American dancer and entertainer
- Fred Astaire (1899–1987), American dancer, singer, and actor
- Jarvis Astaire (1923–2021), British boxing promoter and film producer
- Simon Astaire (born 1961), British novelist, screenwriter, media advisor, and film producer

== Other uses ==
- Astaire (horse), a racehorse
- Astaire, now Blondfire, a Brazilian-American band

== See also ==
- Astar (disambiguation)
- Astair Airlines, a defunct Russian airline
