= Robert Shimp =

American record engineer and producer (born 1976)

Robert Steven Shimp (born April 30, 1976, in Montgomery, Alabama) is an American record engineer and producer. He was an engineer for Toast Studios from 1996 until they closed their doors. He is known for his work with the West Coast rock band The Donnas, for whom he was a live engineer turned producer, and was an engineer For R.E.M.'s Up. In 2018, Robert Shimp opened his own recording studio, Technical Earth Recorders, in Montgomery, Alabama.

== Discography ==
- 1997: Revenge is Sweet, and So Are You - The Mr. T Experience
- 1998: Not Feeling Quite Like Yourself Today? - Clone
- 1998: Get Down! - The Hi-Fives
- 1998: Up - R.E.M.
- 1999: "Strutter" Detroit Rock City OST - The Donnas
- 1999: "Keep On Loving You" Drive Me Crazy OST - The Donnas
- 1999: Bomb - Lovesucker
- 1999: Get Skintight - The Donnas
- 2000: On the List - The Plus Ones
- 2001: "Do You Wanna Hit It" Lookout! Freakout Episode 2 - The Donnas
- 2001: The Donnas Turn 21 - The Donnas
- 2001: Going Dutch - The Plus Ones
- 2002: Spend the Night - The Donnas
- 2002: Its a Calling - The Plus Ones
- 2003: Who Invited You - The Donnas
- 2003: "Backstage" Freaky Friday OST - The Donnas
- 2003: "It's on the Rocks" How to Deal OST - The Donnas
- 2003: "Who Invited You" What a Girl Wants OST - The Donnas
- 2004: "Skintight" Second-Hand Suit Jacket Racket - The Donnas
- 2004: "Dancing With Myself" Mean Girls OST - The Donnas
- 2004: "Please Don't Tease" New York Minute OST - The Donnas
- 2005: Me and Otto - Kissinger
- 2005: Up - R.E.M.
- 2005: "Skintight", "Hyperactive", "Party Action", "40 Boys In 40 Nights", "Play My Game", "Are You Gonna Move It for Me?" The Early Years - The Donnas
- 2006: "Play My Game" Rollergirls OST - The Donnas
- 2007: "Take It Off" Coolest Songs in the World, Vol. 2 - The Donnas
- 2008: We Are What We Pretend To Be - The Fatal Flaw
- 2008: "Too Fast for Love" Under the Covers: Classic Lookout! Records Cover Songs - The Donnas
- 2009: "Play My Game", "Hey, I'm Gonna Be Your Girl", "I Wanna Be with a Girl Like You" Greatest Hits Vol. 16 - The Donnas
- 2009: "Take It Off" The Hangover OST - The Donnas
- 2009: "Dancing with Myself" I Love You Man (film) OST - The Donnas
- 2009: "Skintight", "Do You Wanna Hit It" Lookout! Records: 20 Collection - The Donnas
- 2009: "Are You Gonna Move It for Me?" Be on the Lookout! - The Donnas
