= Gold Medal (album) =

2004 studio album by The Donnas

Studio album by The Donnas
- Released: October 26, 2004
- Recorded: June–July 2004
- Studios: Black in Back (Hollywood); Conway (Hollywood)
- Genre: Hard rock
- Length: 34:01
- Label: Atlantic
- Producer: Butch Walker

The Donnas chronology
Spend the Night (2002)	Gold Medal (2004)	Bitchin' (2007)

Singles from Gold Medal
- 1. "Fall Behind Me" Released: October 11, 2004; 2. "I Don't Want to Know (If You Don't Want Me)" Released: March 7, 2005

Gold Medal is the sixth studio album by American rock band the Donnas, released on October 26, 2004, through Atlantic Records. Leading up to an appearance at the Lollapalooza 2003 festival, drummer Torry Castellano suffered from De Quervain Tendonitis, prompting wrist surgery. The band began rehearsing slower-tempo material, allowing guitarist Allison Robertson to experiment with her playing style. Following a false-start with Scott Litt, the band started working with producer Butch Walker. Sessions were held at Black in Back and Conway Recording Studios, Hollywood, California in June and July 2004. Gold Medal is a hard rock album that continues the sound of their fifth studio album Spend the Night.

Gold Medal received generally favorable reviews from music critics, some praising the band's musicianship and specifically highlighting Robertson's guitar playing, while others felt it lacked lyrical substance. The album sold over 13,000 copies in its first week of release, peaking at number 76 on the Billboard 200. "Fall Behind Me" was released as the lead single in October 2004, and the band promoted the album with the US tour at the end of 2004. "I Don't Want to Know (If You Don't Want Me)" was released as the second single from the album in March 2005, which was followed by a supporting slot for Maroon 5 on the Honda Civic Tour.

== Background and recording ==
The Donnas released their fifth studio album Spend the Night in October 2002. Its lead single "Take It Off" peaked at number 17 on the Billboard Modern rock radio chart. Their profile grew when they appeared on covers for magazines, as well as perform on TV shows such as Saturday Night Live and Total Request Live. In preparation for Lollapalooza 2003, drummer Torry Castellano began suffering from De Quervain Tendonitis. They continued touring with Castellano receiving cortisone injections, until she reached the point where she was forced to stop playing. The band took an extended break from touring from September 2003 as Castellano had wrist surgery. Post-operation, they started rehearsing material for their next album in 2004, opting to play slower-tempo songs as Castellano was still recovering. Guitarist Allison Robertson said this choice allowed her to "explore parts that had more funk and feeling" to them.

Around this time, the band's label Atlantic Records was undergoing personnel changes stemming from the company's owner Warner Music Group switching investors. The band met with several people, before landing on Scott Litt; they travelled from the Bay Area to Los Angeles to start pre-production with him in January 2004. They liked his work with R.E.M. and assumed the partnership would be a good experience based on prior conversations they had. though any work proved fruitless. Upon meeting up, the band realised Litt wanted a different sound than what they were aiming for. From a selection of four-to-five people, they came across Butch Walker, who had recently completed sessions with Avril Lavigne. He was aware there had been some form of disagreement between Litt and the band, and that they wanted to show some growth as a unit.

Walker and the band spent sometime discussing music they liked growing up and what they wanted to takeaway from their influences. In June and July 2004, the band and Walker recorded drums at Black in Back studio, before moving to Conway Recording Studios in Hollywood, California. Paul David Hager served as the main engineer throughout recording, while Seth Waldman, Tony Rambo and Lars Fox acted as assistant engineers. As Castellano was still recovering, the rest of the band recorded their parts first. Chris Lord-Alge mixed the recordings at Image Recording Studios, also in Hollywood, with assistant engineers Keith Armstrong and Dmitar Kranjaic. Emily Lazar then mastered the album at The Lodge in New York City, with assistant engineer Sarah Register.

== Composition ==
Gold Medal continues the hard rock sound of Spend the Night; while influences from AC/DC and the Ramones can still be heard, the band also incorporate portions from Alice Cooper, Golden Earring and Steppenwolf. Uncut writer Stephen Dalton described it as 1970s rock "pastiche meets revved-up sugar-rush melodies, cynical teen-romance lyrics and knowingly dumb sexual innuendo". Bassist Maya Ford Spend the Night was "all fast and hard [...] we limited ourselves"; for Gold Medal, they decided they "should do just what ever we want to do and experiment". Discussing the album's title, Robertson said: "To us, it's going for what we think is the gold. On each song we just went with what sounded best instead of going, 'Oh, the Donnas would never do that.'" They collaborated together instead of letting one individual do a bulk of the writing, resulting in a more melodic sound, aided by Walker's past production work with Lavigne and Simple Plan.

The opening track to Gold Medal, "I Don't Want to Know (If You Don't Want Me)", talks about a disintegrating relationship and is reminiscent of the work of Ash. It is followed by the mid-tempo hard rock track "Friends Like Me", which evokes the sound of the Stooges and the Who. The metallic "Don't Break Me Down" discusses trying to make a relationship work after having moved on quickly from past partners. "Fall Behind Me" recalls the band's earlier sound, while being compared to the work of the Cult; it starts off akin to Status Quo, switching to "Rocket Queen" (1987) by Guns N' Roses. Robertson said it dealt with bands that get ahead of others by luck, only to be forgotten in a short timeframe thereafter. The softer-sounding "Is That All You've Got for Me" marked the first time the band uses acoustic guitars in their music, adding elements of rockabilly. Unlike the rest of the album, "The Gold Medal" features a piano and acoustic guitar break in lieu of an electric guitar solo. Ford referred to the song as a "'fuck you' to San Francisco. We live there, but have never really fitted into the city". The blues-indebted "Out of My Hands" tackles the theme of a long-distance relationship. Kel Munger of News & Review said the power ballad "Revolver" is an "ode to love gone truly, truly bad".

== Release ==
On August 9, 2004, Gold Medal was announced for release in two months' time; a few days later, a music video was filmed for "Fall Behind Me" in Los Angeles, California. They played a small number of club shows on the West Coast, prior to appearing at the Reading and Leeds Festivals in the UK. "Fall Behind Me" was posted online on September 1, 2004, and was released as a single on October 11, 2004. Gold Medal was released on October 26, 2004; coinciding with this, the band members dropped their Ramones-esque stage names in favor of their actual names. Initial promotion was focused on reaching fans through online advertisements and listening parties. Gold Medal's promotional campaign was undercut by personnel turnover at Atlantic Records; the label team that had helped make Stay The Night a success departed and was replaced by a new team that proved less successful at marketing the Donnas.

Gold Medal was one of the first albums released in the DualDisc format, alongside Still Not Getting Any... (2004) by Simple Plan, but was recalled due to a mastering error on the CD side of the album. Warner Music Group provided the affected song on the band's website and allowed buyers to return it for a standard CD copy. The DVD side of it included the album in 5.1 surround sound, the music video for "Fall Behind Me", a behind-the-scenes feature on that video, in addition to lyrics for the album's tracks. The band embarked on a tour of the US throughout November 2004, with support from the Von Bondies and the Starlite Desperation. In January 2005, the band performed at Big Day Out in Australia. On January 26, 2005, the music video for "I Don't Want to Know (If You Don't Want Me)" was posted online. The track was released as a single on March 7, 2005. That same month, the band performed at the South by Southwest music conference. They then supported Maroon 5 on the Honda Civic Tour until May 2005.

== Reception ==
Professional ratings
Aggregate scores
Source	Rating
Metacritic	70/100
Review scores
Source	Rating
AllMusic	3/5 stars
Entertainment Weekly	B
The Guardian	2/5 stars
Pitchfork	5.5/10
Rock Hard	7.5/10
Robert Christgau	(1-star Honorable Mention)
Rolling Stone	3.5/5 stars
Stylus Magazine	B−
This Is Fake DIY	3.5/5 stars
Uncut	4/10

Gold Medal was met with generally favorable reviews from music critics. At Metacritic, the album received an average score of 70, based on 22 reviews.

AllMusic reviewer Zac Johnson said that what the band "lack in 'wall of sound' noise attack they've made up for in nuance; the basslines have never been more intricate, [...] and the whole album sports the most terrific production of any Donnas record to date". This Is Fake DIY reviewer Stephen Ackroyd compliment their "smooth, thought out, structured" sound, with tracks that were "less vitriolic, more melodic". Entertainment Weekly writer David Browne added to this: "With their well-scrubbed sound [...] and Anderson's evenkeeled delivery, the Donnas are now a likable, proficient band". Anthony Miccio of Stylus Magazine added to this by writing that they seem "incapable of playing in anything but the key of badass", and The Japan Times' Philip Brasor said it relied more on "craft than attitude".

The staff at Pitchfork wrote that Robertson's guitarwork has improved with each subsequent release, "gut here she's really tearing it up, giving Gold Medal a more dynamic feel". Rolling Stone's Jenny Eliscu expanded on this, writing that Robertson was "wailing on solos that would make AC/DC's Angus Young proud". PopMatters editor Adam Williams said Robertson "anchors the album with muscular riffs throughout". Lollipop Magazine writer Ari M. Joffe, on the other hand, said Robertson's "blazing guitar playing" had been "either completely stripped away, or toned way down". The staff said at E! Online said the "tempos are sluggish and the lyrics are emotionally vacant". Pitchfork shared a similar sentiment, stating: "The recycled riffs and too-easy lyrical cheese are occasionally still in play". Dalton said that while they be "shamelessly role-playing their Joan Jett schtick," the band "still out-rock earnest retrobores like Jet and Kings Of Leon".

The Austin Chronicle's Christopher Gray praised the members for being confident musicians, however, they had switched from "carefree party girls to jaded cynics practically overnight". Rock Hard reviewer Marcus Schleutermann wrote that what they had "undoubtedly gained in profile," they had "lost the obvious hit factor". Joffe said the album was "devoid of any of the grit the band once possessed", coming across as formulaic. Exclaim! writer Liz Worth said the album "gives off a clean, pop-studded sound, but falls a little flat" when compared to their previous works, and aside from a few highlights, "much of the album blurs together". The Guardian's Dorian Lynskey wrote that whether the change is sound has "done them good, though, is debatable", spotlighting the "lyrical sourness [that has become] less bothersome than their AC/DC posturing".

Spend the Night was successful at MTV and radio, and co-manager Molly Neuman hoped Gold Medal would do as well. It sold over 13,000 copies in its first week of release, reaching number 76 on the Billboard 200. By June 2007, the album has sold 87,000 copies in the US; 79,000 of these were sold in its first year, under-selling Spend the Night's first year sales of 360,000. Neuman theorized that the latter had a "real pop visibility and a pop fan base. But that's a transient fan base—they love it and then leave it. They're not going to be lifelong fans". She also attributed the drop to the failure of the DualDisc format, which she felt may have dismayed fans.

== Track listing ==
All tracks are written by The Donnas.

No.	Title	Length
1.	"I Don't Want to Know (If You Don't Want Me)"	3:47
2.	"Friends Like Mine"	3:38
3.	"Don't Break Me Down"	3:31
4.	"Fall Behind Me"	3:23
5.	"Is That All You've Got for Me"	3:00
6.	"It's So Hard"	2:20
7.	"The Gold Medal"	2:13
8.	"Out of My Hands"	2:47
9.	"It Takes One to Know One"	2:58
10.	"Revolver"	3:30
11.	"Have You No Pride"	2:54

Digital Bonus Track
No.	Title	Length
12.	"Lost and Found"	3:22

== Personnel ==
Personnel per booklet.

The Donnas

- Brett Anderson – lead vocals, piano
- Allison Robertson – guitars, backing vocals
- Maya Ford – bass, backing vocals
- Torry Castellano – drums, percussion, backing vocals

Design

- Greg Gigendad Burke – art direction, design
- James Jean – cover illustration
- Katrina Dixon – photography
- Sam Buffa – studio photography
- Charlie Becker – logo

Production

- Butch Walker – producer
- Paul David Hager – engineer
- Seth Waldman – assistant engineer
- Tony Rambo – assistant engineer
- Lars Fox – assistant engineer
- Chris Lord-Alge – mixing
- Keith Armstrong – assistant engineer
- Dmitar Kranjaic – assistant engineer
- Emily Lazar – mastering
- Sarah Register – assistant engineer

== Charts ==
Chart (2004)	Peak position
Australian Albums (ARIA Charts)	94
Billboard 200	76
