= Asterisk (disambiguation) =

An asterisk is a typographic symbol, the glyph ⟨*⟩.

Asterisk may also refer to:

- Asterisk (liturgy), a liturgical implement
- Asterisk (software), a software implementation of a private branch exchange (PBX)
- "Asterisk", a 2005 song by Orange Range
- "Asterisk" (Suits), a 2012 episode from the television series Suits
- Asterisk (esports), a Singaporean esports organization

== See also ==
- * (disambiguation)
- Aster (disambiguation)
- Asterism (typography), (⁂)
- Asterix (disambiguation)
- Star (disambiguation)
