= ** =

** may refer to:

- **, to express exponentiation in some programming languages
- **, a pointer to a pointer (or double pointer) in C syntax
- **, interpolation of keyword arguments into function calls in Python
- **, symbol in astronomical notation representing:
  - Binary star
  - Double star
  - Multiple star
  - Multiple star system
- 2018 Winter Paralympics (**), whose logo is a pair of vertically side-by-side 1-pointed asterisks

== See also ==
- * (disambiguation)
- *** (disambiguation)
- Two star (disambiguation)
- Star Star
