= Splat =

Splat may refer to:

- Splat (furniture), an element of a chair
- Asterisk (slang)
  - Splatbook, a supplement in some role-playing games
- Nickelodeon Splat!, a television block
  - NickSplat, a later television block also from Nickelodeon
- Splat Pack, a collection of filmmakers
- SPLAT-COSMETICA, a private Russian manufacturer of oral care products
- "Splat!" (The Brak Show), a 2003 episode
- Splat the Cat, a 2008 children's picture book by Rob Scotton
- Splat! (album), an album by Deep Purple
- Gaussian splats, used in Gaussian splatting, a volume rendering technique, in 3D computer graphics
- Texture splat, a computer graphics effect
- SPLAT!, a terrestrial radio propagation model application
- Splat! (video game)
- White Splat, the original name of Indian Queens, a village in Cornwall, England, United Kingdom

== See also ==
- Splatt (disambiguation)
