= Angels with Even Filthier Souls =

Angels with Even Filthier Souls may refer to:

- Angels with Even Filthier Souls, a fictional black-and-white gangster meta-film from Home Alone 2: Lost in New York
- "Angels with Even Filthier Souls", a song from the album From Ohio with Love by the band A Day in the Life
- "Angels with Even Filthier Souls", a song from the 2005 Elektra: The Album soundtrack, by the same group, now called Hawthorne Heights

== See also ==
- Angels with Filthy Souls, a fictional film within the film Home Alone
- Angels with Dirty Faces, a 1938 American crime drama film
