= C* (disambiguation) =

C* is an object-oriented programming language.

It may also refer to:

- Apache Cassandra, a database system
- C*-algebra, an algebra
- Star and crescent, the symbols used on flags and emblems
- Characteristic velocity, the rocket propulsion concept
- Star cluster, an astronomical object type
- Convergence (goth festival), a goth festival
- C*, the group of non-zero complex numbers
