= Amber Dalton =

American professional esports player

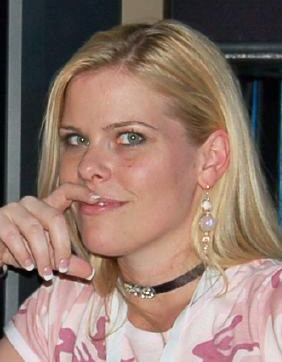
- Dalton at the 2006 Electronic Entertainment Expo
- Other names: Athena Twin
- Occupation: Computer gamer

Amber Dalton is an American professional esports player and co-founder of PMS Clan Inc. She used the handle Athena Twin.

== Early life ==
Dalton is from San Antonio, Texas.

== Career ==
Dalton was a pro gamer (under the alias "Athena Twin"), in 2007 she was ranked in the top 10 players of Fight Night. In 2002, with her twin sister, Amy Brady, Dalton co-founded PMS Clan Inc., one of the oldest and largest competitive gaming communities for women. It was once the largest clan for the Xbox Live platform. In the present day, it has 57,588 unique members.

Topics in the PMS Clan forum include: Tech talk, clan pages for various games, and sub-subsections for PC, PlayStation and the Xbox for discussing various games. She has been the main face of the clan; in 2005, MTV had her demonstrate the Xbox 360 console, and Next Generation Business named her one of the "Game Industry's 100 Most Influential Women" for the organization's work at dispelling stereotypes about women in gaming and creating a safe space for female gamers.

== PMS Clan and Twitch ==
Dalton left a job in finance to concentrate on pro gaming and to run PMS Clan, which she self-funded until she attracted sponsorship and incorporated. Since 2011, she has worked at Twitch, where she is director of Marketing Events. Dalton handed over the management of PMS Clan to Regina Wu in 2013.
