= /= =

/= may refer to:

- Augmented assignment, an operator for divisions
- Relational operator, a symbol meaning not equal to
- Inequation, denoted by the character ≠
- Currency sign for:
  - Kenyan shilling
  - Tanzanian shilling
  - Ugandan shilling

== See also ==
- *= (disambiguation)
