= A* =

A* or A star may refer to:

- A* search algorithm, a pathfinding algorithm used in computing
- A*, the highest grade in some examination systems such as the GCE Advanced Level
- A*STAR, the Singapore Agency for Science, Technology and Research
- AStar, the Eurocopter AS350 Écureuil helicopter
- Class A star, a star of spectral class A
- Sagittarius A*, a radio source at the center of the Milky Way, believed to be a supermassive black hole
- Maruti A-Star, a subcompact kei-class car

== See also ==
- Astar (disambiguation)
- Star (disambiguation)
- * (disambiguation)
- A (disambiguation)
