= Astar (disambiguation) =

Astar may refer to:

== People with the name Astar ==
- Astar, a New Zealand news presenter
- Shay Astar (born 1981), an actress

== Businesses ==
- ASTAR (company) a Spanish firearms company
- Astar Air Cargo, an American cargo airline based in Miami, Florida
- Astar Network, a blockchain

== Other uses ==
- Astar (game), two-player abstract strategy board game
- Astar (god), or ʿAṯtar, an astral god
- Agency for Science, Technology and Research, or ASTAR, a statutory board of Singapore
- Eurocopter AS350 AStar helicopter
- A* search algorithm, a search algorithm for graphs

== See also ==
- Ashtar (disambiguation)
- A* (disambiguation)
