= Ashtar =

Ashtar may refer to:

- Ashtar Sheran, an allegedly channeled alien with a flying saucer fleet that operates in the vicinity of Earth
- Malik al-Ashtar (died 658), companion of Ali Ibn Abi Talib, cousin of Muhammad, and Arab military commander
- alternate spelling of the Ethiopian Aksumite god Attar
- Ashtar, the Emperor of Darkness, an antagonist in the 1990 video game Ninja Gaiden II: The Dark Sword of Chaos
- Ashtar, an Iranian sniper rifle; see List of military equipment manufactured in Iran

== See also ==
- Ashtar-Chemosh, a Moab goddess in Middle East mythology
- Astar (disambiguation)
- Ishtar, an ancient Mesopotamian goddess possibly connected to Attar
