= Splatt =

Splatt may refer to:

== People ==
- Clem Splatt (1899–1963), Australian rules footballer
- William Splatt (1811–1893), Australian politician

== Places ==
- Splatt, Cornwall, a hamlet

== See also ==
- Splat (disambiguation)
- Splott, a district in Cardiff, Wales
