= PMS Clan =

All-female gaming group

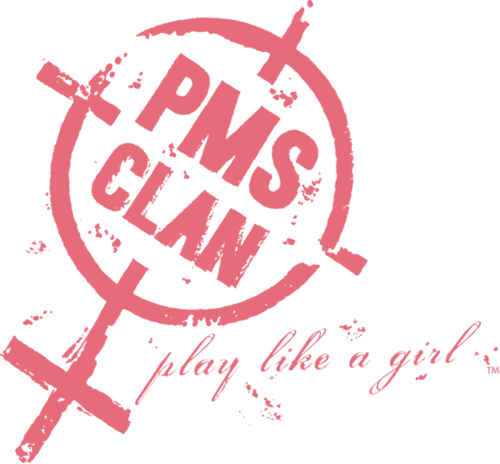
- Divisions: PMS PC (Counter Strike 1.6); PMS PlayStation; PMS Xbox (Unreal Championship); PMS Wii (Super Smash Bros. Brawl)
- Founded: 2002
- Location: United States
- Website: www.pmsclan.com

PMS Clan (previously short for Psychotic Man Slayerz, now short for Pandora's Mighty Soldiers) is an all-female multi-platform online gaming group.

== History ==
PMS Clan was founded by Amber Dalton and Amy Brady, also known by their gamertags as “Athena Twin” and “Athena/Valkyrie” respectively. Initially called Psychotic Man Slayers, in two years they changed for Pandora’s Mighty Soldiers as they began landing sponsors and getting opposition for its name.

In various interviews the PMS Clan members stated their mission as changing the perception that competitive online and offline gaming is dominated by male hardcore gamers.

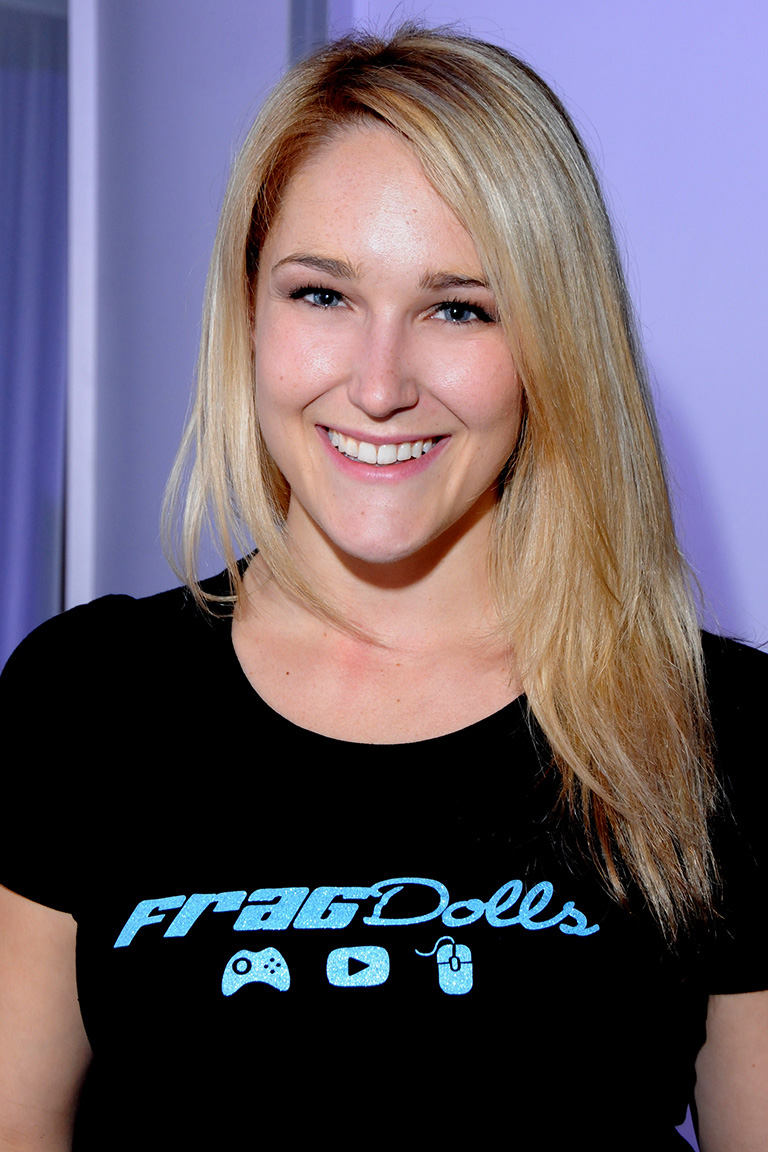
PMS Member, Rachel "Seltzer" Quirico at E3 in Los Angeles, California in 2014

In order to join the clan female gamers have to join a division featuring a game that allows for online matches and tournaments. The games vary from Massively multiplayer online role playing games, to racing and shooters.

In 2004, the PMS Clan expended their presence online by forming a PlayStation division. The same year an EU Division was launched.

In 2006, the PMS Clan became a partner of Verizon for FiOS Grand Tournament. The same year Women in Technology International, a professional organization for tech-savvy women, selected the PMS to be their gaming ambassadors.

From 2007 to 2008 the Clan expended to the Latin America, Asia and Oceania regions.

In 2013 Regina Wu assumed the management of PMS Clan.

== Members ==
As of 2008, the PMS Clan had over 1,000 members on multiple platforms and five continents. As stated on their website entire PMS Clan community is reaching 60,000 women and allies. The age of the PMS Clan members ranges from 13 to 51 years old.

== See also ==
- Asterisk, previously known as PMS Asterisk
- Frag Dolls
- Women and video games
