= Asterix (Indonesian band) =

Asterixband
- Origin: Jakarta, Indonesia
- Genres: Alternative
- Years active: 2006
- Label: RadioGram Rkord
- Past members: Sersan Major

Asterix were an Indonesian alternative group whose members would later go on to change their name and form the first line-up of V2up. During the band's short-lived time under this name they recorded one album in 2006 and released the single "Andaikan". Hard rock journalist, RERE BEDE, noted the group as one of the, "333nine of proto funk."

== Discography ==
- asterixband (album) (2014)
