= Astar Network =

Blockchain

- Initial release: 17 January 2022; 4 years ago
- Written in: Rust
- Type: Blockchain
- License: GNU General Public License
- Website: astar.network
- Repository: github.com/AstarNetwork/Astar

Astar Network is a blockchain that aims to become Polkadot's "smart contract hub" and serves as a parachain for Polkadot. The native token is "ASTR". The developers are members led by Sota Watanabe. Originally started under the name "Plasm Network" and rebranded as "ASTAR Network" in September, 2021。Mainnet opened to the public on January 17, 2022.

== Concept ==
=== ASTR ===
Astar Network uses "ASTR" as the native token, which is used to pay for gas in transactions, as a governor's token for the ability to propose and vote on project policies, and as a reward for staking.。

=== dApps staking ===
dApps staking" is a system that rewards developers and users for staking the network's native token "ASTR" for dApps (distributed applications) and infrastructure integrated with the Astar Network. By staking ASTRs to specific dApps, it is possible to support developers while receiving rewards.。

=== Smart contract ===
Astar Network provides EVM (Ethereum Virtual Machine) and WASM (WebAssembly) functionality to Polkadot, making it easy to migrate dApps (decentralized applications) and smart contracts created on Ethereum. Thereby serving as a hub for multi-chain smart contracts supporting multiple blockchains。
