= *= =

*= may refer to:

- Augmented assignment, an operator for multiplication
- A relational database join, in deprecated SQL syntax

== See also ==
- /= (disambiguation)
