= Splat-Cosmetica =

Private manufacturing and trading company

SPLAT Global
- Type: Private
- Industry: Personal care
- Founded: 2000
- Headquarters: Russia, Switzerland, Latvia, China, Turkey
- Products: oral care and beauty products
- Number of employees: 1268 (2021)
- Website: splatglobal.com

Splat-Cosmetica (since 2018 — SPLAT Global) is a private manufacturing and trading company that produces health products, body care, oral hygiene products, home care products, as well as cosmetics. The company was established in 2000 by Evgeny Demin and Elena Belous. Company owns two production facilities. First own factory Organic Pharmaceuticals is located in Okulovsky District of Novgorod Oblast. In October 2022 company acquired Сapella LLC factory in the city of Dzerzhinsk, Nizhny Novgorod region. The company name comes from Spirulina platensis—among its first products were cosmetics and dietary supplements containing this blue-green algae.

Around 17-20 % of its products are exported outside Russia to more than 60 countries such as China, Singapore, India, Qatar and many others. The company does not advertise on TV but relies on word of mouth communication. It is known for letters from the cofounder Evgeniy Demin that are found inside toothpaste packs.

== Products ==
SPLAT Global is primarily a lincensed oral hygiene products manufacturer. It produces oral hygiene products under trademarks SPLAT, Biomed. Apart from its principal brand, it has other oral care brands Iney, Innova.

The company also makes home care products under BioMio trademark, launched in 2014.

== History ==
The SPLAT-Cosmetica was founded in 2000, using rented production facilities near Moscow and started to make toothpaste. In 2001, the company launched SPLAT Professional line of toothpaste and in 2008 an oral care foam for children, and black toothpaste with charcoal for adults.

At the end of 2009, the company bought premises in Okulovsky District of Novgorod Oblast in order to convert it into the production of toothpaste.

By 2010, the company became the number three player in the Russian toothpaste industry.

In 2011 the Company started international expansion in particular to Chinese market. The same year the exclusive rights to the SPLAT trademark were transferred to IWI AG, Switzerland. The company was included in the “Global Entrepreneurship and the Successful Growth Strategies of Early-Stage Companies” report released by the World Economic Forum and Stanford University. According to the report, in 2010, the company held a 10% share of the Russian toothpaste market and made over 60 million USD in projected revenue.

In 2014, it launched ecologically sound cleaning products under the trade name BioMio.

In 2015 the company acquired licenses for the release of the Biomed brand of complex natural oral care products from the copyright holder SkyLab AG, Switzerland.

In 2016 company launched its own production of toothbrushes at the Organic Pharmaceuticals factory and opened an office in India.

In 2018, SPLAT Cosmetica was renamed SPLAT Global.

In 2022, SPLAT Global acquired the Capella LLC factory in the city of Dzerzhinsk, Nizhny Novgorod Region.

== Directors ==
CEO - Demin Evgeny Valerievich
