= Characteristic velocity =

Measure of rocket performance

Characteristic velocity, denoted $c^*$ (pronounced c-star), is a measure of the combustion performance of a rocket engine independent of nozzle performance, and is used to compare different propellants and propulsion systems. It is independent of the nozzle, making it a useful metric for evaluating propellant combustion alone. c* should not be confused with c, which is the effective exhaust velocity related to the specific impulse by: $I_{sp} = \frac{c}{g_0}$. Specific impulse and effective exhaust velocity are dependent on the nozzle design unlike the characteristic velocity, explaining why C-star is an important value when comparing different propulsion system efficiencies. c* can be useful when comparing actual combustion performance to theoretical performance in order to determine how completely chemical energy release occurred, or the combustion efficiency. This is known as c*-efficiency, or $n_v$, and is calculated by dividing $c^*_{Actual}$ with $c^*_{Theoretical}$. Standard values for $n_v$ range from 0.85 to 1.03.

== Formula ==
$c^*_{Actual} = \frac{p_c A_t }{\dot{m}}$

- $c^*$ is the characteristic velocity (m/s, ft/s).
- $p_c$ is the chamber pressure (Pa, psi).
- $A_t$ is the area of the throat (m^{2}, in^{2}).
- $\dot{m}$ is the mass flow rate of the engine (kg/s, slug/s).

$c^*_{Theoretical} = \frac{I_{sp} g_0}{C_F} = \frac{c}{C_F} =\sqrt{\frac{RT_c}{\gamma} \Bigl(\frac{\gamma+1}{2}\Bigr)^{\frac{\gamma+1}{\gamma-1}}}$

Alternative Imperial form:

$c^*_{Theoretical} = \frac{I_{sp} g_0}{C_F} = \frac{c}{C_F} =\frac{\sqrt{ \gamma R T_c}}{\gamma \sqrt{{\frac{2}{\gamma +1}}^\frac{\gamma +1}{\gamma -1}}}$

- $I_{sp}$ is the specific impulse(s).
- $g_0$ is the gravitational acceleration at sea-level (m/s^{2}).
- $C_F$ is the thrust coefficient.
- $c$ is the effective exhaust velocity (m/s).
- $\gamma$ is the specific heat ratio for the exhaust gases.
- $R$ is the gas constant per unit weight (J/kg-K).
- $T_c$ is the chamber temperature (K).

== See also ==
- Characteristic length (L*)
- Thrust coefficient (C_{F})
