= WCG Ultimate Gamer =

- Starring: Hannah Simone; Joel Gourdin
- Country of origin: United States
- No. of seasons: 2
- No. of episodes: 16 (list of episodes)

Production
- Running time: 60 minutes

Original release
- Network: Syfy
- Release: March 10, 2009 – October 7, 2010

WCG Ultimate Gamer is a reality television program that aired on Syfy, sponsored by Samsung and the World Cyber Games (WCG). The show was hosted by Hannah Simone and co-hosted by Joel Gourdin. The first season began airing on March 10, 2009. The second season was confirmed at CES on January 7, 2010, and began airing on August 19, 2010, finishing on October 7, 2010.

== Format ==
WCG Ultimate Gamer has 12 gamers living in one loft. Each episode they would compete in a Real Life Challenge and in an Isolation Challenge. The Real Life Challenge complemented and provided a clue to the actual Xbox 360 game they were to play later in the Isolation challenge. For example, the players played paintball before playing Halo 3, had a dunk contest before playing NBA Live 09, and drifted cars before playing Project Gotham Racing 4. The gamer with the highest score from both challenges had the choice to pick one other gamer to play against the gamer with the lowest score in an Elimination Challenge where the loser goes home. The competitor with the highest score could also pick themselves to play the lowest scoring gamer, but this rule was discontinued in season 2. Sometimes the two gamers in the Elimination Challenge have to pick someone to partner with them in the challenge, but their partner is not at risk of elimination.

== Seasons ==
Season	Winner	Started	Ended
Season 1	Mark Smith	March 10, 2009	April 28, 2009
Season 2	Katherine Gunn	August 19, 2010	October 7, 2010
