= Darin Raffaelli =

American guitarist

Darin Raffaelli is a guitarist, formerly of the band Supercharger. In the 1990s he owned the indie record label Super-Teem. He was a producer for The Donnas and songwriter for the band's first album, which was recorded at a Mail Boxes Etc. shop where he worked, and released on his Super-Teem label in 1997. Other bands Raffaelli has been involved with to date are The Brentwoods, Donny Denim, The Bobbyteens, and The Fevers. He is now a member of the bands Mersey Wifebeaters and the Baci Galoopis.
