= Asterisk (esports) =

Singaporean women's esports organisation

Asterisk*
- Founded: 2005
- Based in: Singapore

Asterisk (stylised as Asterisk*; formerly Team Asterisk and PMS Asterisk) is a Singaporean women's esports organisation. It was founded by Tammy Tang in 2005 as an all-women Dota team.
