= *** =

***, a series of three asterisks, may refer to:

- *** (novel), a 1994 novel by Michael Brodsky
- Dinkus, a row of three spaced asterisks (* * *) usually used to indicate a section break
  - Asterism (typography) (⁂), three asterisks in a triangle, a variant of the dinkus

== See also ==
- Three star (disambiguation)
