= The Donnas =

American rock band

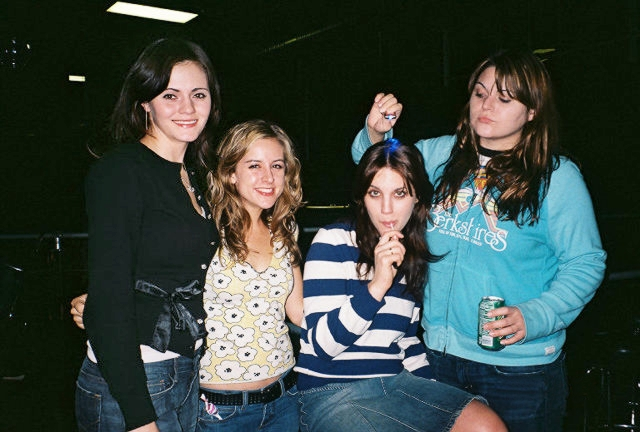
- The Donnas in 2002

Background information
- Also known as: The Electrocutes; Ragady Anne; Screen
- Origin: Palo Alto, California, U.S.
- Genres: Punk rock; Bubblegum pop-punk; hard rock; riot grrrl; garage punk (early)
- Years active: 1993–2012
- Labels: Atlantic; Lookout!; Sympathy for the Record Industry; Radio Trash; Purple Feather; Super*teem!
- Past members: Brett Anderson; Allison Robertson; Maya Ford; Amy Cesari; Torry Castellano

The Donnas were an American rock band formed in Palo Alto, California, in 1993. The band consisted of Brett Anderson (lead vocals), Allison Robertson (guitar, backing vocals), Maya Ford (bass guitar, backing vocals) and Torry Castellano (drums, percussion, backing vocals). Amy Cesari replaced Castellano, who left the band in 2009 due to tendonitis. They drew inspiration from the Ramones, the Runaways, Girlschool, AC/DC, Bachman–Turner Overdrive and Kiss. Rolling Stone has stated that "the Donnas offer a guileless take on adolescent alienation; they traffic in kicks, not catharsis, fun rather than rage". MTV has stated that the band offers "a good old-fashioned rock & roll party".

After gathering a cult following in the punk scene since their 1997 debut, the band achieved major label commercial success in the early 2000s and afterward as their music mixed punk, metal and classic rock sounds.

== History ==
=== Origins and early years: 1993–2001 ===
All four founding band members were born in 1979. Lead vocalist Brett Anderson on May 30; guitarist Allison Robertson on August 26; bassist Maya Ford and drummer Torry Castellano, both on January 8. They all became friends by eighth grade and formed as a band in May 1993 to play for their school's "Day on the Green." One of two all-female bands in their town Palo Alto, California, they were relatively unknown until they were out of high school. They are all self-taught musicians and practiced in Castellano's garage nearly every day during their years at Palo Alto High School. They called themselves "Ragady Anne" in their early days and shortly thereafter changed their name to "The Electrocutes".

Towards the end of their high school days, while they were still known as the Electrocutes, they decided to create another band (with the same members) that would play softer tunes without distorting the metal queen image of the Electrocutes. To help their fans distinguish between the two bands, they all took matching "Donna" monikers, where all of their names were Donna and their last names were the first initial of their last name (Brett Anderson became Donna A, etc.), which they used only when performing as "The Donnas."

They worked with producer Darin Raffaelli for their first two albums, the first of which, simply called The Donnas, was released on Raffaelli's Super*teem! record label. (It was later released again on Lookout! Records.) They took a week off their senior year of high school to tour Japan as The Donnas, and were promoted and organized by Pinky Aoki of The Phantom Gift. Afterwards, they signed with Lookout! Records. As the band grew, they were urged to sign with a major label company. In December 2001, they signed with Atlantic Records.

=== Atlantic Records: 2002–2005 ===
In 2002, the Donnas released Spend the Night as their Atlantic debut. The album represented their first attempt at mainstream success. With their single "Take it Off" they were booked for appearances on Total Request Live, Saturday Night Live, The Tonight Show with Jay Leno, and the Late Show with David Letterman. In the summer of 2003, they played the main stage at Lollapalooza. In 2004, they released their sixth album Gold Medal. In February 2005, they toured Australia with the Big Day Out music festival, playing from Sydney to Perth. While in Australia they performed "Take It Off" live on national prime-time show Rove Live with Rove McManus.

Atlantic repeatedly placed the Donnas' music in video game soundtracks. "You've Got a Crush On Me" can be heard in the PlayStation 2 game Splashdown. "Who Invited You" can be found on the soundtracks for True Crime: Streets of LA and MVP Baseball 2003 as well as Splashdown: Rides Gone Wild. "I Don't Want to Know" is in the Gran Turismo 4 soundtrack also and a cover of the song was also used for Donkey Konga 2 for the GameCube. "I Don't Want to Know" was also used as the theme song for the first season of The-N's hit series, South of Nowhere. A cover of "Take it Off" is featured in Guitar Hero and added as a downloadable track in Guitar Hero 2 on the Xbox 360 (released in 2006) and Downhill Domination (released in 2004). Rock Band 2 (for the PlayStation 2, PlayStation 3, Xbox 360 & Wii), released by Harmonix in 2008, features the track "New Kid In School" which was released exclusively on Apples iTunes service. "Fall Behind Me" was also used in a national television commercial advertising the Nissan Xterra while "Take It Off" was used in a Budweiser commercial. It was also featured on the soundtrack of the 2009 feature film The Hangover.

Atlantic also energetically marketed the Donnas through placements in numerous film soundtracks. The band appeared in the movie Drive Me Crazy in 1999 (as The Electrocutes), and later on the TV show Charmed performing the single "Fall Behind Me" at P3. They also appeared in the 1999 teen comedy Jawbreaker as the prom band, contributing two songs to the soundtrack ("Rock 'N' Roll Machine" and "Checkin' It Out"). A cover of "Roll On Down The Highway" was used in the Disney comedy film Herbie: Fully Loaded and "Backstage" was used in Freaky Friday. The Donnas can also be heard in Mean Girls during the end credits playing a cover of the Billy Idol song "Dancing With Myself", and they also contributed to the soundtrack of the movie Grind. The video "Too Bad About Your Girl" also features the cast of that film. The song "Take It Off" features in the movie Dodgeball. The song "Take Me To The Backseat" can be heard in the action comedy film 2004 D.E.B.S.. A cover version of the Kiss song "Strutter" was used in the soundtrack to the 1999 movie Detroit Rock City. "Please Don't Tease" was used in New York Minute and "Everyone Is Wrong" was featured in the movie Elektra. Then Guitar Hero used "Take It Off" for 2009's Guitar Hero Smash Hits. "Take It Off" was also used in the 2009 hit movie The Hangover. "Play My Game" was featured in a Season 1 episode of What's New, Scooby Doo?. "Who Invited You" is featured on the soundtrack of the 2003 movie What a Girl Wants.

=== New label, lineup change and dissolution: 2006–2012 ===
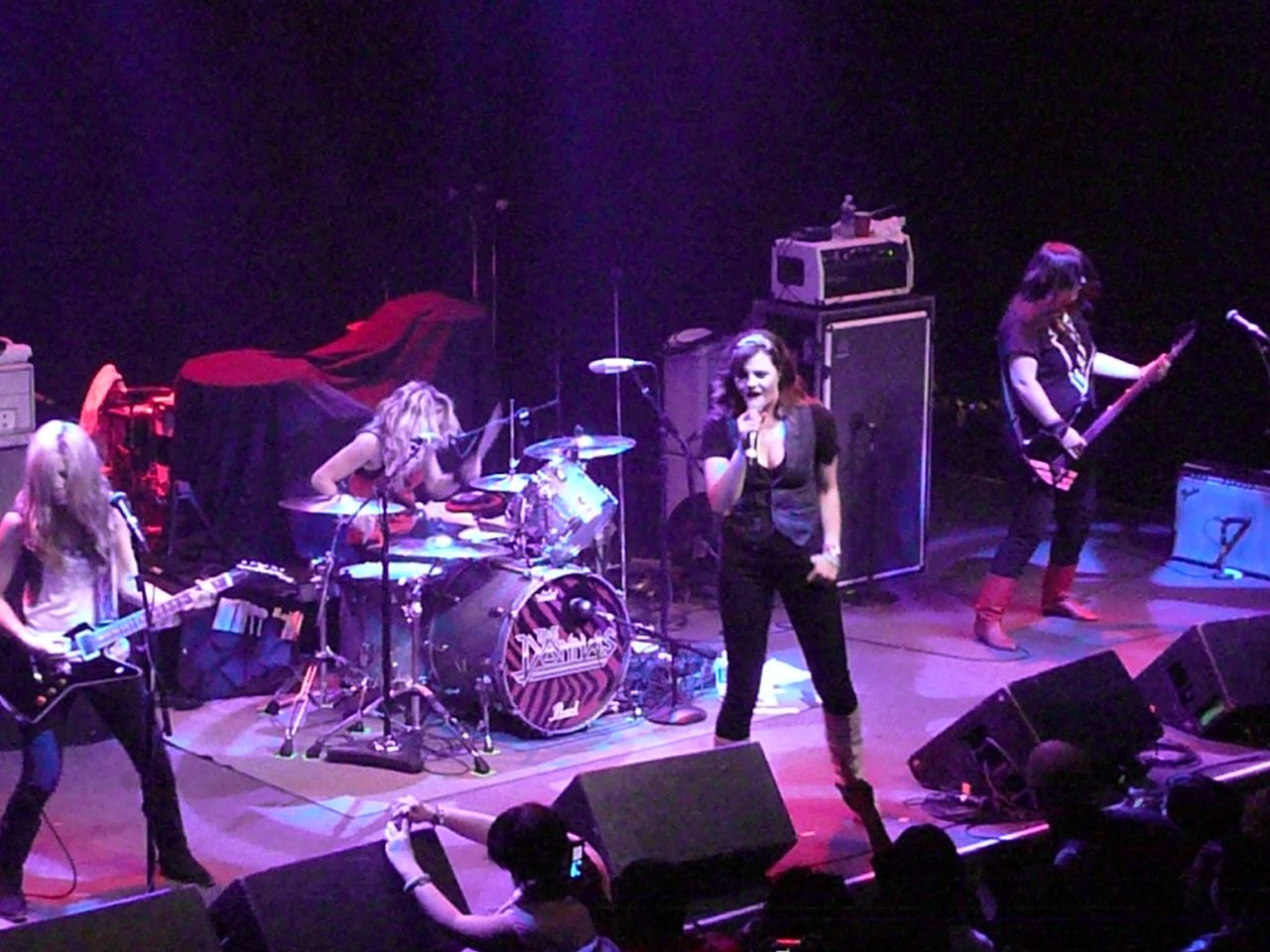
Performing in 2008

On May 19, 2006, the Donnas announced on their public message board that they had "parted ways with Atlantic Records," claiming "[t]he decision was entirely mutual and completely amicable and will not impact the band, nor will it impact upon the writing, recording or touring for the next Donnas album." In March 2007, the Donnas released a single, "Don't Wait Up For Me," and had a new band logo designed.

The Donnas independently released their seventh studio album titled Bitchin' on September 18, 2007 Purple Feather Records label. Bitchin' was produced by Jay Ruston and The Donnas and contained the single "Don't Wait Up For Me".

In 2008, the Donnas toured with the Melbourne-based, Australian band Kisschasy as part of their Skin and Bones tour. They also toured the U.S. and Canada with The Hives.

In July 2009, the band released a retrospective collection titled Greatest Hits Vol. 16 to celebrate the band's 16th year together. The album contained new songs, re-recorded older songs as well as some unreleased material. The band toured that summer with Pat Benatar and Blondie on the two's joint Call Me Invincible Tour. Drummer Torry Castellano was unable to play on any of these tour dates as she was suffering from tendonitis of the shoulder, which was accredited to the fact that as a self-taught drummer she had held the drumsticks incorrectly (even though it felt right to her) and sustained long term damage over time. Long-time friend Amy Cesari of the Demonics has been chosen to fill in for Castellano.

On July 9, 2010, Castellano announced via the band's website that due to her continued shoulder problems she would have to retire from drumming and performing with the Donnas. She returned to school at Santa Monica College and then Stanford University, where she graduated in 2013 and went on to Harvard Law School. She is currently an attorney working at the Texas Office of Capital and Forensic Writs (OCFW) which serves as a post-conviction public defender.

In November 2016 Cherry Red Records re-released the band's fifth album, Spend the Night, to include six bonus tracks which consist of B-sides and songs from previous albums.

In an interview from 2017, the band's lead vocalist, Brett Anderson, discussed "the end of the band" and turning down offers to reunite.

== Band members ==
- Brett Anderson – lead vocals, piano (1993–2012)
- Allison Robertson – guitars, backing vocals (1993–2012)
- Maya Ford – bass, backing vocals (1993–2012)
- Torry Castellano – drums, backing vocals (1993–2009)
- Amy Cesari – drums, backing vocals (2009–2012)

Timeline

== Discography ==
- The Donnas (1997)
- American Teenage Rock 'n' Roll Machine (1998)
- Get Skintight (1999)
- The Donnas Turn 21 (2001)
- Spend the Night (2002)
- Gold Medal (2004)
- Bitchin' (2007)

== See also ==
- List of bands from the San Francisco Bay Area
