= Redeye Distribution =

American independent record label

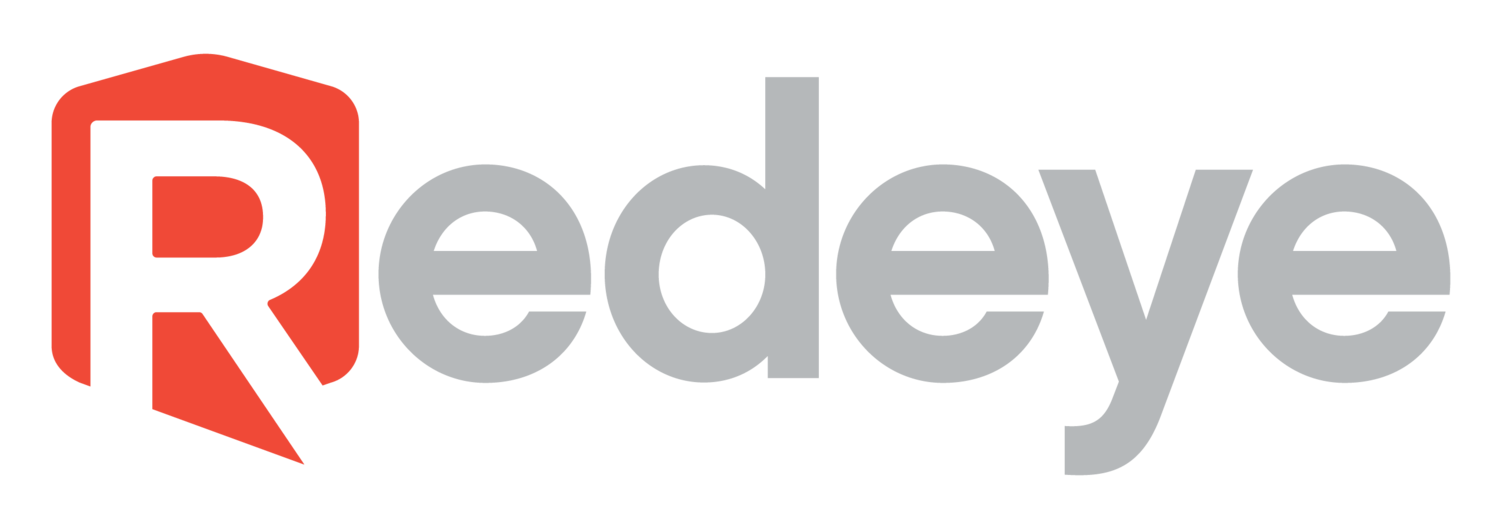
- Industry: Music distribution
- Founded: 1996; 30 years ago
- Founder: Tor Hansen; Kim Hansen; Glenn Dicker
- Headquarters: Hillsborough, North Carolina, United States
- Area served: Worldwide
- Owner: Exceleration Music
- Subsidiaries: Border Music; Yep Roc Records
- Website: Official website

Redeye Distribution is an American independent record label based in Hillsborough, North Carolina. It was founded in 1996 by Tor Hansen, Kim Hansen, and Glenn Dicker.

== History ==
Redeye is represented worldwide with U.S. offices in Hillsborough as well as San Francisco, Los Angeles, Chicago, Seattle, and New York City. The company has international offices in London, Berlin; Sydney, Australia; and Toronto. Redeye is also a member of multiple industry-related organizations including Merlin, the Music Business Association (MBA), and A2iM.

Redeye owns and operates the Yep Roc Music Group, a label group which includes Yep Roc Records, Break World Records, and Studio One Records in addition to the Riff City Sounds publishing company. It was awarded the National Association of Recording Merchandisers Distributor of the Year Award (Small Division) seven times in 2000, 2002, 2003, 2004, 2005, 2006, and 2007. The MBA honored Redeye with the Independent Spirit Award at Music Biz 2016.

In December 2019, Redeye acquired major Swedish distributor Border Music. In January 2020, Redeye became the distributor of Domino Recording Company, Saddle Creek Records, and Beggars Group. In July 2020, Redeye announced "staffing changes" to increase diversity after online blowback surrounding racial business practices and hostile work environments, which came shortly after the company announced their support via social media for the Black Lives Matter movement during the George Floyd protests.

In 2023, Redeye was acquired by Exceleration Music.

== Distributed labels ==
- 6131 Records
- Alive Naturalsound Records
- American Dreams Records
- Analog Africa
- Ardent Records
- Barsuk Records
- Beggars Group (US only)
  - 4AD
  - Matador Records
  - Rough Trade Records
  - XL Recordings
  - Young
- Brainfeeder
- Carpark Records
- City Slang
- Daptone Recording Co.
- Domino Recording Company
- Don Giovanni Records
- Double Double Whammy
- Drag City
- Earth Libraries
- Erased Tapes
- Everloving Records
- Exploding in Sound
- Eyeball Records
- Fake Four Records
- Fire Talk
- Get Better Records
- Greenleaf Music
- Grönland Records
- Hyperdub
- Innovative Leisure
- International Anthem Recording Co.
- Jealous Butcher Records
- Kill Rock Stars
- King2Music Records, Sweden
- The Leaf Label
- Luaka Bop Records
- Mello Music Group
- Memphis Industries
- Mom + Pop Music
- New West Records
- Ninja Tune
- Northern Spy Records
- NNA Tapes
- Otá Records
- Outside Music
- Planet Mu
- PNKSLM
- Proper Records
- Ramp Local
- Ray Charles Foundation
- Real Gone Music
- Saddle Creek Records
- Sargent House Records
- Secret City Records
- SideOneDummy Records
- Signature Sounds Recordings
- Skin Graft Records
- Slumberland Records
- Soul Jazz Records
- Stones Throw Records
- StorySound Records
- Strut Records
- Studio !K7
- Studio One
- Subliminal Sounds
- Sundazed Music
- Sunset Blvd Records
- Superpuma Records
- Tangerine Records
- Tee Pee Records
- Three Lobed Recordings
- Thrill Jockey
- Topshelf Records
- Tru Thoughts
- Tzadik
- Vizztone Records
- Warp Records
- We Are Busy Bodies
- World Music Network
- Yep Roc Records

== International partners ==
- Proper UK
- The Planet Company/MGM
