= Purple Feather Records =

Independent record label

Purple Feather Records is an independent record label started by the members of the rock band The Donnas. In or before May 2006, The Donnas and Atlantic Records "parted ways". The band then sought a deal with other record companies but was unable to get one with terms that were to their liking, so the following year, they formed their own label. The Donnas announced their decision in Billboard's July 2007 'Independents Day' issue, which they were on the cover.

The label is distributed by RedEye Distribution in the United States, and various other distributors around the world.

The first album released on Purple Feather Records was The Donnas' own Bitchin' on September 18, 2007. The album reached #8 on the Independent Albums chart and #89 on the Billboard 200.

The Donnas released a second album (their last to date) through the label entitled Greatest Hits Vol. 16 on July 7, 2009.
