= Torry Castellano =

American drummer

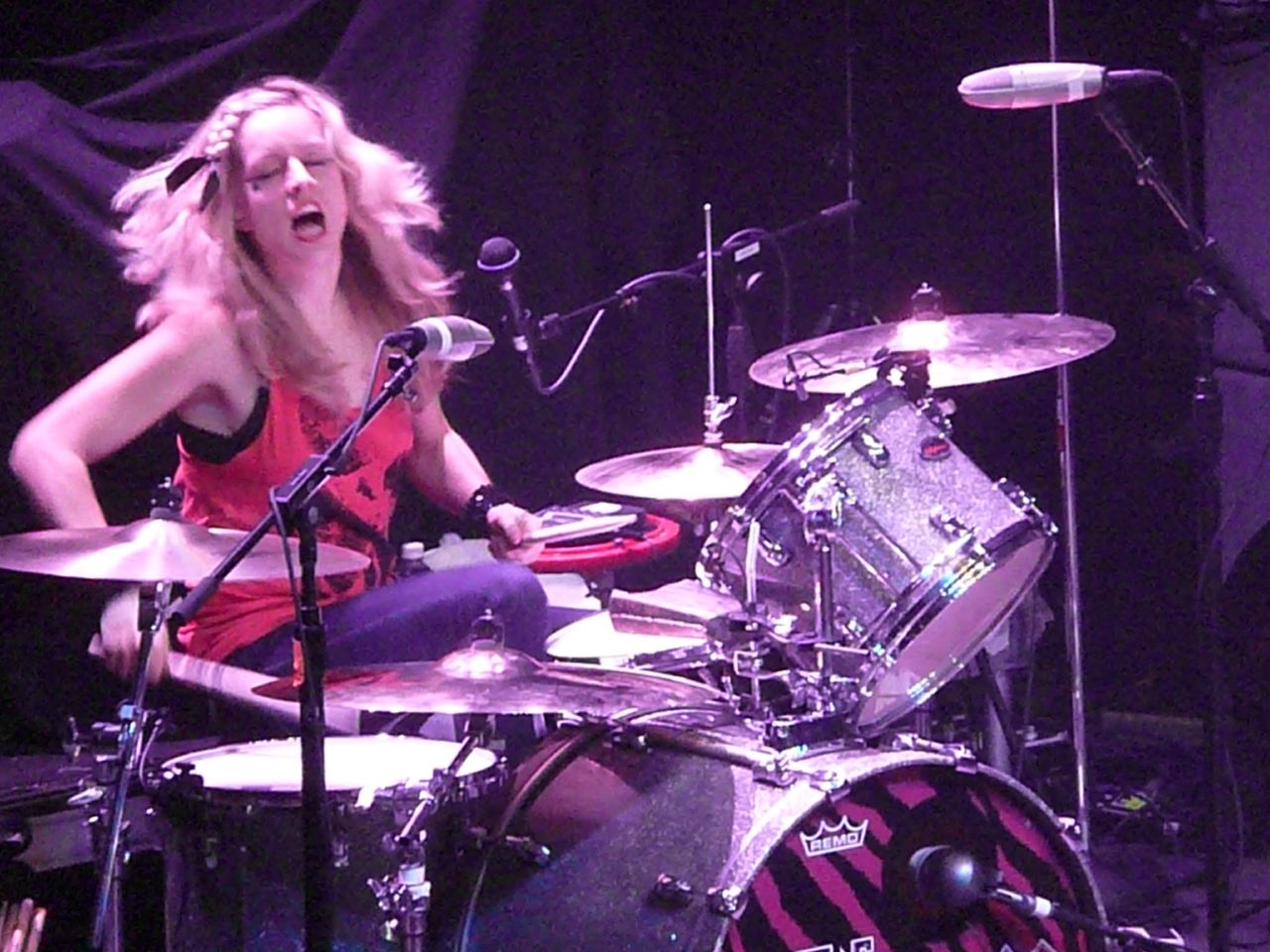
- Castellano performing with The Donnas (2008).

Background information
- Born: Torrance Heather Castellano; January 8, 1979 (age 47)
- Origin: San Francisco, California, U.S.
- Genre: Rock
- Occupation: Drummer
- Years active: 1993–2010
- Labels: Lookout!, Atlantic, Purple Feather
- Formerly of: The Donnas
- Website: www.thedonnas.com

Torrance Heather Castellano (born January 8, 1979) is an American attorney and the former drummer of The Donnas. She announced her retirement from drumming in July 2010.

== Early life ==
Castellano was born in San Francisco, California. She met future bandmates Maya Ford, Brett Anderson and Allison Robertson in junior high school. They formed a band in 8th grade called Ragady Anne, later calling themselves The Electrocutes at Palo Alto High School.

== Career ==
=== Musician ===
Before the release of The Donnas' sixth studio album Gold Medal, Castellano developed tendonitis and in October 2003, she had surgery for it. During her recovery, she had to take drum lessons to re-learn to hold drum sticks the correct way.

=== Lawyer ===
She attended Santa Monica College before transferring to Stanford University, majoring in political science. Castellano graduated from Stanford with distinction and attended Harvard Law School. While at Harvard, she interned for Adalah, Habeas Corpus Research Center, and Article 36.
