= Brett Anderson (American musician) =

American singer (born 1979)

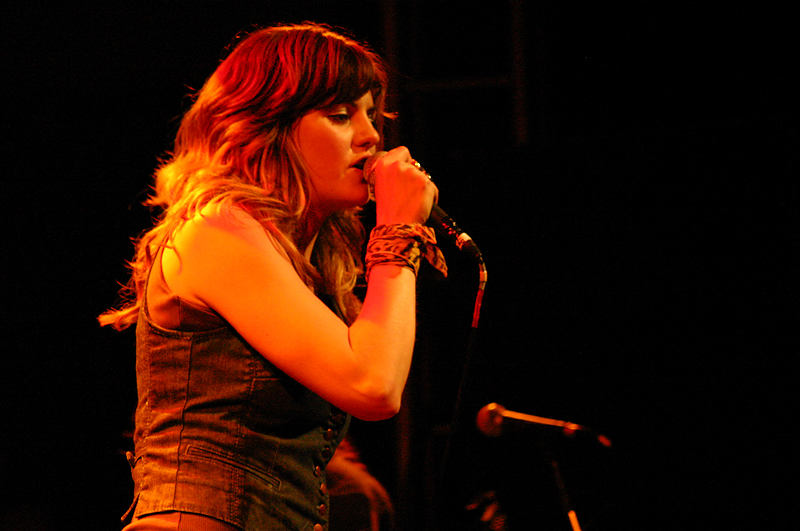
- Anderson in 2007

Background information
- Born: Brett Elizabeth Anderson; May 30, 1979 (age 47)
- Origin: Bloomington, Indiana, United States
- Genre: Rock
- Occupations: Singer
- Years active: 1993–present
- Labels: Lookout!, Atlantic, Purple Feather
- Formerly of: The Donnas
- Website: www.thedonnas.com

Brett Elizabeth Anderson (born May 30, 1979, in Bloomington, Indiana) is an American singer and was the lead vocalist of rock band The Donnas. She previously went by the name Donna A.

== Early life ==
Anderson was born on May 30, 1979, in Bloomington, Indiana. She moved to Palo Alto, California in the seventh grade. She met her bandmates Torry Castellano, Maya Ford and Allison Robertson in junior high school. They formed a band in eighth grade called Ragady Anne, later calling themselves The Electrocutes at Palo Alto High School.

== Other work ==
Anderson appeared on the album Brats on the Beat: Ramones for Kids singing "California Sun". Anderson is featured in the songs "Party Til We Die" by The Leftovers, "Hey There Ophelia" by MC Lars, and "Who's to Blame" and "My War" by Sugar Knives, and has performed with Camp Freddy. Since The Donnas' hiatus in 2012, Anderson has begun singing in a few different bands under the names Born Angry, Alpha Beta and The Stripminers. In 2014, Anderson co-wrote and recorded soundtracks for Fitbit's "It's All Fit" campaign and the "Nissan Versa in Motion" commercial. Anderson also co-wrote and performed the music in the trailer for Edward Hemingway's "Bad Apple's Perfect Day".

Anderson completed a degree in psychology at Stanford University. In 2021, she had earned a Master of Social Work at UCLA, and in 2022, completed a master's degree in gerontology at the University of Southern California.

In 2023, she provided lead vocals on the theme song of That '90s Show.
