= Allison Robertson =

American musician (born 1979)

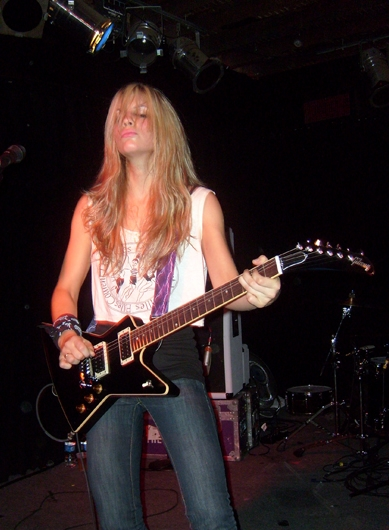

Background information
- Born: Allison Rae Robertson; August 26, 1979 (age 46)
- Origin: North Hollywood, California, United States
- Genres: Rock
- Occupation: Guitarist
- Years active: 1993–present
- Labels: Lookout!, Atlantic, Purple Feather
- Website: www.thedonnas.com

Allison Rae Robertson (born August 26, 1979) is an American musician and the former guitarist for rock bands The Donnas and Chelsea Girls.

== Early life ==
Allison Robertson was born on August 26, 1979, in North Hollywood, California. She comes from a musical family. Her father is musician Baxter Robertson who wrote the track "Feel The Night" on The Karate Kid soundtrack as well as writing and performing the track "Vanishing Point" on the Body Rock soundtrack. Her mother, Lisa Jimenez, worked for A&M Records and for a variety of music publishing companies in Los Angeles prior to the family relocating to Palo Alto in the early 1980s. Although she was born in North Hollywood, she later moved to Palo Alto, California, early in her childhood. She started to play guitar at the age of 12.

== Music ==
Her first guitar was a Mexican-made Fender Telecaster which she later sold to get her first Gibson guitar. In Palo Alto she met her bandmates (from what was later known as The Donnas) Torry Castellano in 4th grade, Maya Ford in 5th grade, and Brett Anderson in 7th grade in school. They formed a band in 8th grade called Ragady Anne, later calling themselves The Electrocutes at Palo Alto High School. She toured with the band, straight out of high school.

She is known for playing Gibson guitars and Marshall amps, her signature guitar is a Gibson Les Paul Standard.

=== Side projects ===
In 2006, she formed the band Elle Rae, with her sister Emily. The name was a combination of both their middle names, Ellen and Rae. Elle Rae has recorded two songs, both of which are available for streaming on their Myspace page. One of the songs is a cover of the Split Enz track "Six Months in a Leaky Boat".

In early 2007, she played lead guitar for band Loudlion. One of their songs appeared on The Hills Have Eyes 2 soundtrack.

As of May 2007, she has her own show called Fun in The Dungeon with Allison Robertson on the internet radio station Women Rock Radio.

In January 2009 Allison joined with Samantha Maloney (ex. Mötley Crüe, Hole), former Playboy model/disc jockey Jill Janus, and Corey Parks (ex. Nashville Pussy), to form Chelsea Girls. Chelsea Girls were offered a monthly gig at The Roxy Theatre in Los Angeles, after the band's first three live shows there sold out and attracted major media attention.

In February 2010 Robertson announced that she was no longer playing with Chelsea Girls via The Donnaholics message boards. In October 2010 Robertson began playing select shows with the Chelsea Girls once again.
