= Maya Ford =

American musician

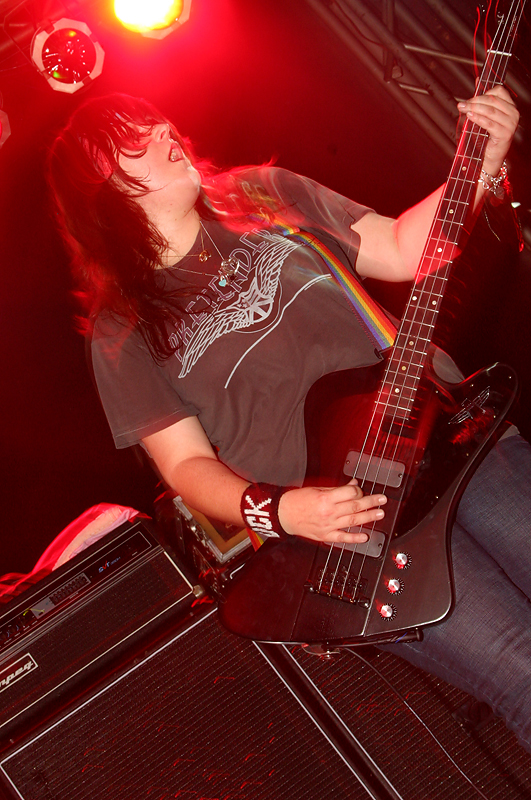

Background information
- Born: January 8, 1979 (age 47)
- Origin: Oakland, California, U.S.
- Genres: Rock
- Occupation: Bassist
- Years active: 1993–present
- Labels: Lookout!, Atlantic, Purple Feather
- Formerly of: The Donnas
- Website: www.thedonnas.com

Maya Ford (born January 8, 1979, in Oakland, California) is an American musician and the former bass player of rock band The Donnas. She also went by the name Donna F.

== Early life ==
Ford was born on January 8, 1979, in Oakland, California, on the same day as her former band member Torry Castellano. She met future bandmates Torry Castellano, Brett Anderson and Allison Robertson in junior high school. They formed a band in 8th grade called Ragady Anne, later calling themselves The Electrocutes at Palo Alto High School. Ford started to play the bass guitar at age 13. Initially she was playing guitar (she received an acoustic guitar from her cousin), but then she decided to switch to the bass.
