= List of all-female bands =

This is an alphabetized list of notable all-female bands, of all genres, and is a spin-off list from the all-female band article. It is an overview of notable all-female bands that have their own articles. A band is a group of musicians who are organized for ensemble playing. An all-female band is a band which has consisted entirely of female musicians for at least three-quarters of its active career.

This article only lists all-female bands who perform original material that is either authored by themselves or authored by another musician for that band's use. Therefore vocal groups (girl groups) are not included. All-female tribute acts, cover bands and fictional all-female bands, such as those created for scripted television programs, are also not included.

== Other ==
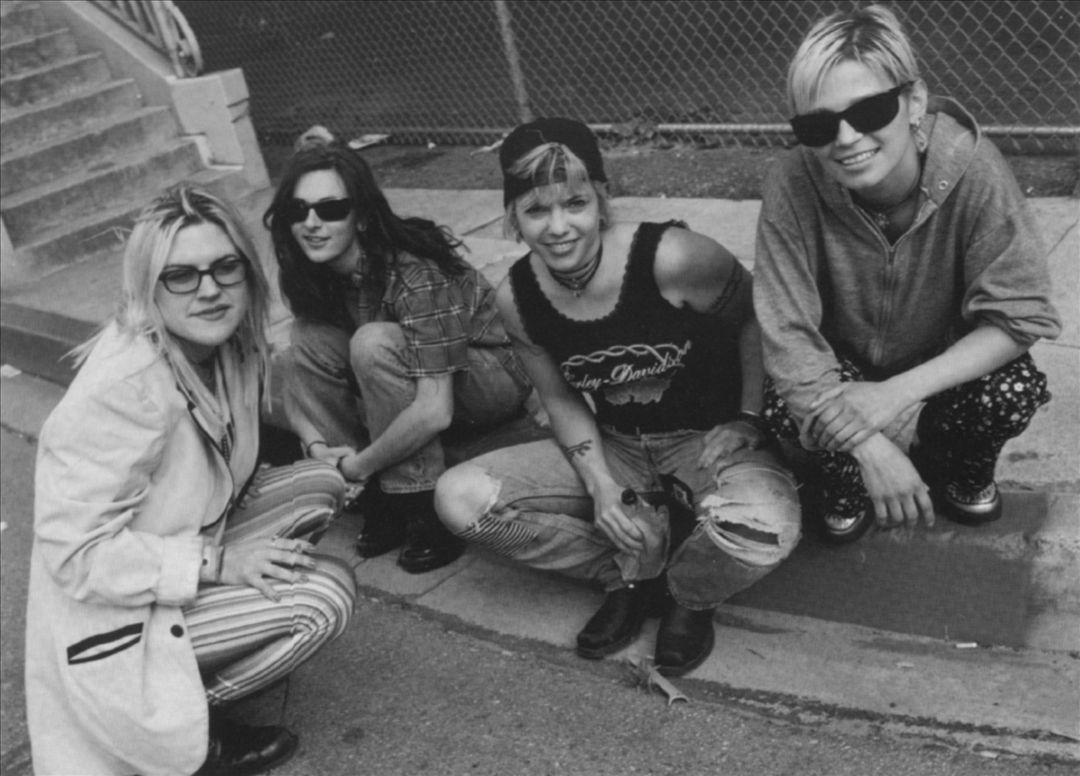
7 Year Bitch

- 54 Nude Honeys (Japan) (1992-2007)
  - Vivi, Kotome, Yuri
- The 5,6,7,8's (Japan) (1986–)
  - Yoshiko "Ronnie" Fujiyama, Sachiko Fujii, Akiko Omo
- 21st Century Girls (United Kingdom) (1998–2000)
  - Leanne Garner, Fiona Garner, Kate Turley, Meriam "Mim" Mohammad, Charlotte Fendek
- 7 Year Bitch (United States) (1990–1997)
  - Valerie Agnew, Lisa Fay Beatty, Elizabeth Davis, Roisin Dunne, Stefanie Sargent, Selene Vigil

== A ==
- The Ace of Cups (United States) (1967–1972; 2017–)
  - Mary Gannon, Marla Hunt, Mary Ellen Simpson, Diane Vitalich, Denise Kaufman
- The Aces (United States) (2016–)
  - Katie Henderson, McKenna Petty, Alisa Ramirez, Cristal Ramirez
- Adickdid (United States) (1991–1995)
  - Kaia Wilson, Nalini "Deedee" Cheriel, SaraBellum
- Audrey (Sweden) (2001–)
  - Victoria Scoglund, Anna Tomlin, Emelie Molin, Rebecca Kristiansson
- Afrirampo (Japan) (2002–2010; 2016–)
  - Oni, Pikachu
- Ajaqa (Australia)
  - Erica Ajaka, Tracy Ajaka, Catherine Ajaka, Mary Ajaka
- Aldious (Japan)
  - Yoshi, Toki, Sawa, Rin, Marina
- All Girl Summer Fun Band (United States) (1998- )
  - Kim Baxter, Ari Douangpanya, Kathy Foster, Jen Sbragil
- Aly & AJ (United States) (2004–)
  - Aly Michalka, AJ Michalka
- American Girls (United States)
  - Brie Howard, Teresa James, Hillary Shepard, Debbie Tressler, Miiko Watanabe
- Amiina (Iceland) (2004–)
  - Edda Run Olafsdottir, Solrun Sumarlidadottir, Hildur Arsaelsdottir, María Huld Markan Sigfusdottir
- The Amorettes (United Kingdom) (2009–2019)
  - Gill Montgomery, Hannah McKay, Heather McKay
- Androids of Mu (United Kingdom) (1979–1983)
  - Suze da Blooze, Corrina, Cozmic, Bess
- Antigone Rising (United States) (1998–)
  - Cassidy, Cathy Henderson, Nini Camps, Kristen Henderson, Dena Tauriello
- Aphasia (Japan) (1994–)
  - Yumi Kondoh, Sumiko 'Goe' Ishikawa, Kyoko 'Kyon' Morita, Junko 'Jun' Takeda
- The Applicators (United States) (1999–)
  - Erica, Kristina, Sabrina, Stephanie

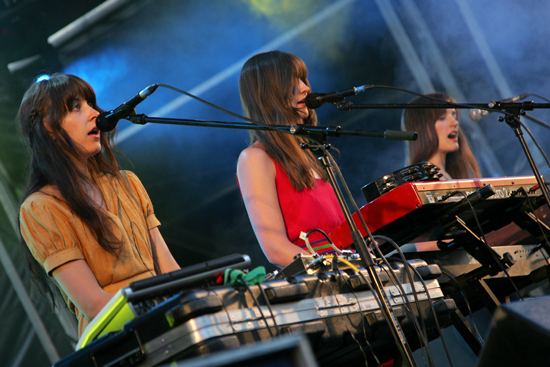
Au Revoir Simone

- The Aquanettas (United States) (1987–1995)
  - Jill Richmond, Deborah Schwartz, Stephanie Seymour, Claudine Troise
- Ars Nova (Japan) (1983–)
  - Keiko Kumagai, Shinko "Panky" Shibata, Hazime, Satoshi Handa
- Astarte (Greece) (1995–2014)
  - Maria "Tristessa" Kolokouri, Hybris, Derketa
- Au Revoir Simone (United States) (2003–)
  - Erika Forster, Annie Hart, Heather D'Angelo
- Autoclave (United States) (1990–1991)
  - Melissa Berkhoff, Christina Billotte, Nikki Chapman, Mary Timony
- Ave Mujica (Japan) (2023-)
  - Oblivionis (Kanon Takao), Mortis (Yuzuki Watase), Timoris (Mei Okada), Doloris (Rico Sasaki), Amoris (Akane Yonezawa)
- Azure Ray (United States) (2001–2004; 2008–)
  - Maria Taylor, Orenda Fink

== B ==
- The 'B' Girls (Canada) (1977–1979)
  - Lucasta Ross, Renee Schilhab, Xenia Holiday, Cynthia Ross, Rhonda Ross, Marcy Saddy, Elisa Moldanado, Lyla Vander
- Babes in Toyland (United States) (1987–2001; 2014–2020)
  - Kat Bjelland, Lori Barbero, Michelle Leon, Maureen Herman
- Baby in Vain (Denmark)
  - Lola Hammerich, Benedicte Pierleoni, Andrea Thuesen
- Band-Maid (Japan)
  - Saiki Atsumi, Miku Kobato, Kanami Tōno, Akane Hirose, Misa
- The Bangles (United States) (1981–1989; 1998–)
  - Susanna Hoffs, Debbi Peterson, Vicki Peterson, Michael Steele, Annette Zilinskas
- BarlowGirl (United States) (1999–2021)
  - Alyssa Barlow, Rebecca Barlow, Lauren Barlow
- The Beaches (Canada) (2013–)
  - Jordan Miller, Kylie Miller, Leandra Earl, Eliza Enman-McDaniel
- The Be Good Tanyas (Canada)
  - Frazey Ford, Samantha Parton, Trish Klein
- Bellatrix (Iceland)
  - Elíza M Geirsdóttir, Sigrún Eiríksdóttir, Ester Bíbí Ásgeirsdóttir, Birgitta Vilbersdóttir
- Bella Tromba (UK)
- The Belle Stars (United Kingdom)
  - Stella Barker, Clare Hirst, Miranda Joyce, Jennie McKeown, Sara-Jane Owen, Judy Parsons, Lesley Shone
- Betty Blowtorch (United States)
  - Blare N. Bitch, Bianca Butthole, Judy Molish, Sharon Needles
- Betty Boop (Serbia)
  - Tara Krlić, Anja Prošić, Nina Doroškov, Kristina Krpogačin
- Big Joanie (United Kingdom)
  - Stephanie Phillips, Chardine Taylor-Stone, Estella Adeyeri
- The Big Moon (United Kingdom) (2014–present)
  - Juliette Jackson, Fern Ford, Celia Archer, Soph Nathan
- Big Trouble (United States)
  - Bobbie Eakes, Julia Farey, Rebecca Ryan, Suzy Zarow, Bess Motta, Heli Sterner, Cece Worrall
- Birtha (United States) (1968–1975)
  - Shele Pinizzotto, Rosemary Butler, Sherry Hagler, Olivia "Liver" Favela
- The Black Belles (United States)
  - Olivia Jean, Ruby Rogers, Christina Norwood, Shelby Lynne O'Neal, Erin Belle
- Blaxy Girls (Romania)
  - Rucsandra Iliescu, Anamaria Nanu, Amalia Tirca, Gela Marinescu, Cristina Marinescu
- Blestyashchiye (Russia)
  - Olga Orlova, Irina Lukyanova, Jeanna Friske, Yulia Kovalchuk, Anna Semenovich et al.
- Blue Rose (United States)
  - Cathy Fink, Laurie Lewis, Marcy Marxer, Molly Mason, Sally Van Meter
- Bleach (Japan)
  - Kanna, Miya, Sayuri
- Body Type (Australia)
  - Sophie McComish, Annabel Blackman, Georgia Wilkinson-Derums, Cecil Coleman

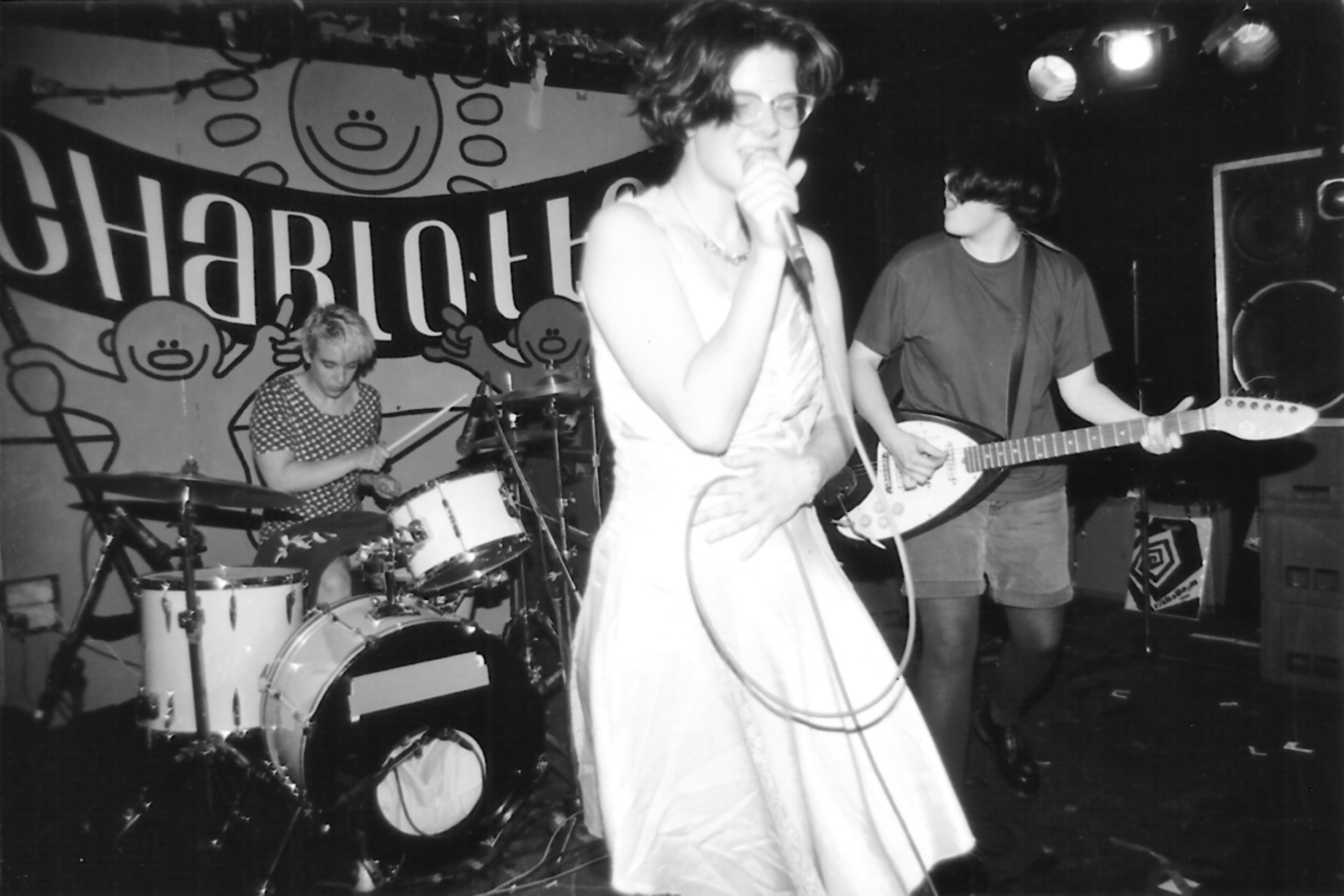
Bratmobile

- The Bodysnatchers (United Kingdom) (1979–1981)
  - Stella Barker, Rhoda Dakar, Miranda Joyce, Pennie Leyton, Sarah Jane Owens, Jane Summers, Nikki Summers
- Bond (United Kingdom/Australia)
  - Haylie Ecker, Eos Chater, Tania Davis, Gay-Yee Westerhoff, Elspith Hanson
- Bones Apart (United Kingdom)
  - Becky Smith, Jayne Murrill, Helen Vollam, and Lorna McDonald
- Bones UK (United Kingdom)
  - Rosie Bones, Carmen Vandenburg, Heavy
- boygenius (United States)
  - Julien Baker, Phoebe Bridgers, Lucy Dacus
- Boye (Serbia)
  - original lineup: Biljana Babić, Jasna Manjulov, Ljiljana Radaković, and Klaudija Gavrilović
- Bratmobile (United States)
  - Molly Neuman, Erin Smith, Allison Wolfe
- Brats (Japan)
  - Rei Kuromiya, Aya Kuromiya
- Bridear (Japan)
  - Kimi, Haru, Ayumi, Natsumi, Moe
- Broadzilla (United States)
  - Rachel May, Kim Essiambre, Angie Manly
- The Buoys (Australia)
  - Zoe Catterall, Tess Wilkin, Courtney Cunningham, Hilary Geddes, Anthea Compton, Roslyn Helper, Sophie Moroney, Ellie Moroney, Emily Jane
- Burning Witches (Switzerland)
  - Laura Guldemond, Sonia Nusselder, Seraina Telli, Romana Kalkuhl, Lala Frischknecht, Jay Grob
- The Butchies (United States) (1998–2005)
  - Alison Martlew, Kaia Wilson, Melissa York

== C ==
- Cacadou Look (Yugoslavia)
  - Jasmina Simić, Tatjana Simić, Suzana Kožić, Tamara Vrančić, Sandra Vrančić, Giovanna Kirinić, Alenka Medinković
- Cadallaca (United States)
  - Sarah Dougher, Junior, Corin Tucker
- Celtic Woman
  - Chloë Agnew, Lisa Kelly, Lisa Lambe, Susan McFadden, Mairead Nesbitt
- Cake Like (United States)
  - Nina Hellman, Kerri Kenney, Jody Seifert
- Calamity Jane (1980s) (United States)
  - Mary Fielder, Mary Ann Kennedy, Linda Moore, Pam Rose
- Calamity Jane (1990s) (United States)
  - Gilly Ann Hanner, Megan Hanner, Lisa Koenig
- Camp Cope (Australia)
  - Georgia McDonald, Kelly-Dawn Hellmrich, Sarah Thompson
- Candy (Malaysia)
  - Patricia Robert, Mary David, Connie David, Nancy Gregory
- Care Bears on Fire (United States)
  - Sophie, Isadora "Izzy", Jena
- Chai (Japan)
  - Mana, Kana, Yuki, Yuna
- Chalk Circle (United States)
  - Sharon Cheslow, Anne Bonafede, Mary Green, Jan Pumphrey, Tamera Lyndsay
- Chatmonchy (Japan)
  - Eriko Hashimoto, Akiko Fukuoka, Kumiko Takahashi
- Cherri Bomb (United States)
  - Julia Pierce, Miranda Miller, Nia Lovelis, Rena Lovelis
- Cherry Boom (Taiwan)
  - Cha Cha, Kwa, Hsiao Tsien, Ta Tien
- The Capricorns (United States)
  - Kirsten Nordine, Heather Lynn
- The Chicks (United States) (1990–)
  - Martie Maguire, Emily Robison, Natalie Maines, Laura Lynch, Robin Lynn Macy
- Chicks on Speed (United States/Germany/Australia)
  - Alex Murray-Leslie, Melissa Logan
- Childbirth (United States)
  - Julia Shapiro, Stacy Peck, Bree McKenna
- Chocolate, Menta, Mastik (Israel)
  - Yardena Arazi, Ruthie Holzman and either Tami Azaria (1972–1973) or Leah Lupatin
- Cimorelli (United States)
  - Christina Cimorelli, Katherine Cimorelli, Lisa Cimorelli, Amy Cimorelli, Lauren Cimorelli, Dani Cimorelli
- Civet (United States)
  - Liza Graves Riersgard, Suzi Homewrecker, Christian Riersgard, Jonny Grill
- Clews (Australia)
  - Grace Richardson, Lily Richardson
- Client (United Kingdom)
  - Kate Holmes, Nicole Thomas, Sarah Blackwood, Emily Mann
- The Clingers (United States)
  - Patsy Clinger, Debra Clinger, Melody Clinger, Peggy Clinger

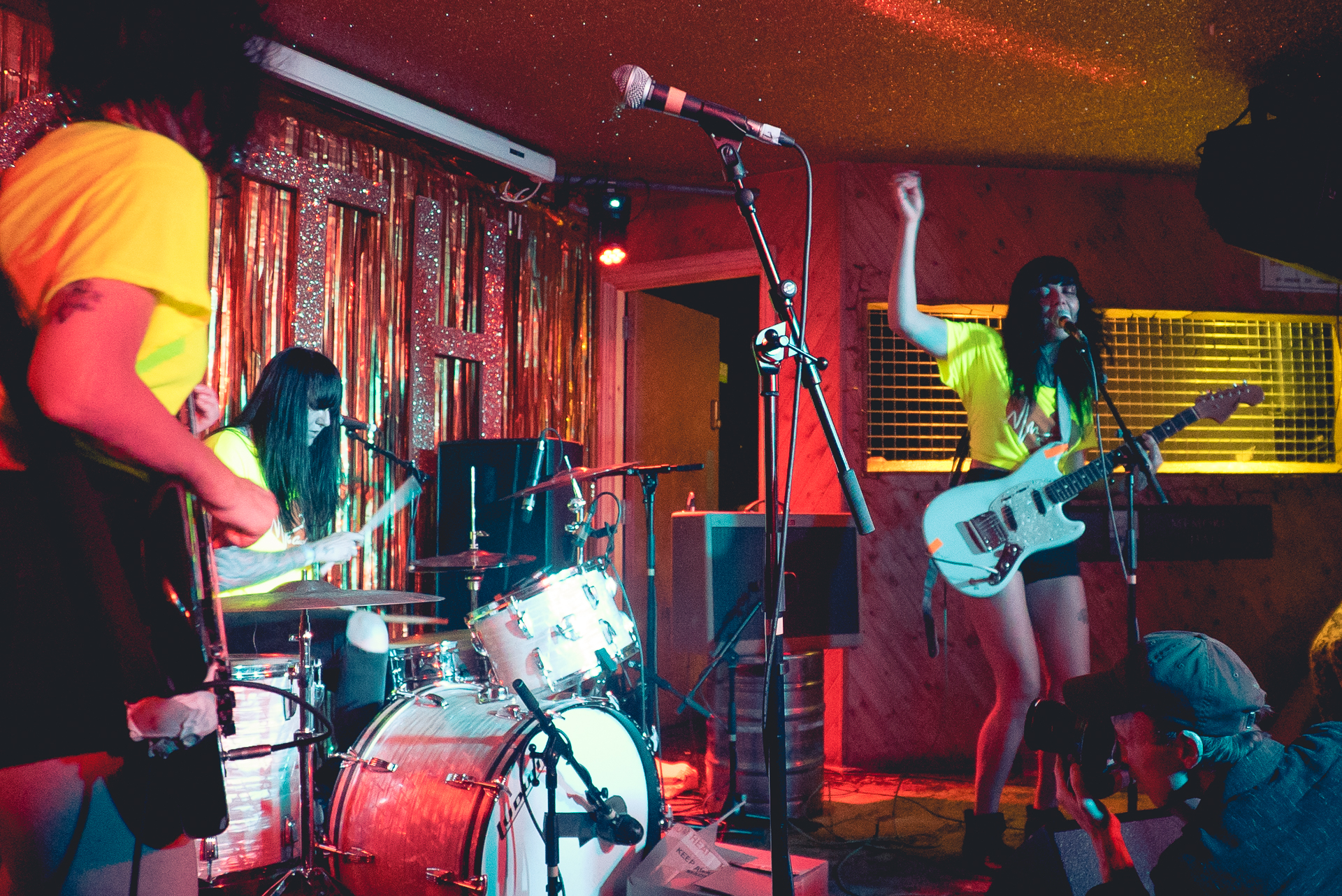
The Coathangers

- The Coathangers (United States)
  - Meredith Franco, Julia Kugel, Stephanie Luke
- Cobra (China)
  - Yang Ying, Yu Jin, Wang Xiaofang, Xiao Nan
- Cobra Killer (Germany)
  - Gina V. D'Orio, Annika Trost
- Cobra Spell (Netherlands)
  - Kris Vega, Sonia "Anubis" Nusselder, Hale Naphtha, Adri Funérailles, Bel Mena, et al.
- CocoRosie (France)
  - Bianca Cassady, Sierra Cassady
- Cookie Crew (United Kingdom)
  - Susie Banfield, Debbie Pryce
- The Continental Co-ets (United States) (1963–1967)
  - Nancy Hofmann, Carol Goins, Vicki Steinman, Carolyn Behr, MaryJo Hofmann
- Conquer Divide (United States), (United Kingdom), (Serbia)
  - Kiarely Castillo, Janel Duarte, Kristen Woutersz, Isabel Johnson, Tamara Tadic, Ashley Colby
- Cowboy Crush (United States)
  - Trenna Barnes, Debbie Johnson, Becky Priest, Renaé Truex
- Coyote Sisters (United States)
  - Leah Kunkel, Marty Gwynn, Renee Armand
- Crucified Barbara (Sweden)
  - Mia Coldheart, Klara Force, Ida Evileye, Nicki Wicked, Joey Nine
- Crypta (Brazil)
  - Tainá Bergamaschi, Luana Dametto, Jéssica di Falchi, Fernanda Lira
- Cub (Canada)
  - Lisa G., Robynn Iwata, Lisa Marr
- Cyntia (Japan)
  - Saki, Yui, Ayano, Azu
- Cypher in the Snow (United States)
  - Anna Joy Springer, Dan-yella Dyslexia, Shari Lambchop, Ulla Imd, Margaret Hitchcock, Chloe Little Hope, Lala Hulse

== D ==
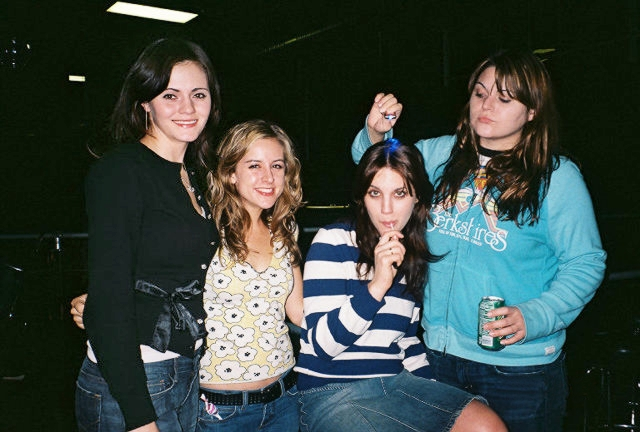
The Donnas

- Daddy Issues (United States)
  - Jenna Moynihan, Jenna Mitchell, Emily Maxwell
- The Daisy Chain (United States) (1967–1968)
  - Shel Le, Camille, Rosemary Lane, Dee Dee Lea
- The Deadly Nightshade (United States) (1967–1970; 1972–1977; 2008–)
  - Helen Hooke, Anne Bowen, and Pamela Brand
- Dead Disco (United Kingdom)
  - Victoria Hesketh, Lucy Catherwood, Marie France
- The Devotchkas (United States)
  - Jennifer, Mande, Alaine, Gabrielle
- Dickless (United States)
  - Jana McCall, Kerry Green, Kelly Canary, Lisa Smith
- The Ditty Bops (United States)
  - Abby DeWald and Amanda Barrett
- Dog Party (United States)
  - Gwendolyn Giles, Lucy Giles
- Doll Skin (United States)
  - Meghan Herring, Sydney Dolezal, Nicole Rich, Alex Snowden
- Dolly Mixture (United Kingdom)
  - Rachel Bor, Hester Smith, Debsey Wykes
- The Donnas (United States)
  - Brett Anderson, Allison Robertson, Maya Ford, Amy Cesari, Torry Castellano
- Drain STH (Sweden)
  - Martina Axén, Flavia Canel, Anna Kjellberg, Maria Sjöholm
- Dream Nails (United Kingdom)
  - Janey Starling, Anya Pearson, Lucy Katz, Mimi Jasson
- Dum Dum Girls (United States)
  - Dee Dee, Jules, Malia, Sandy

== E ==
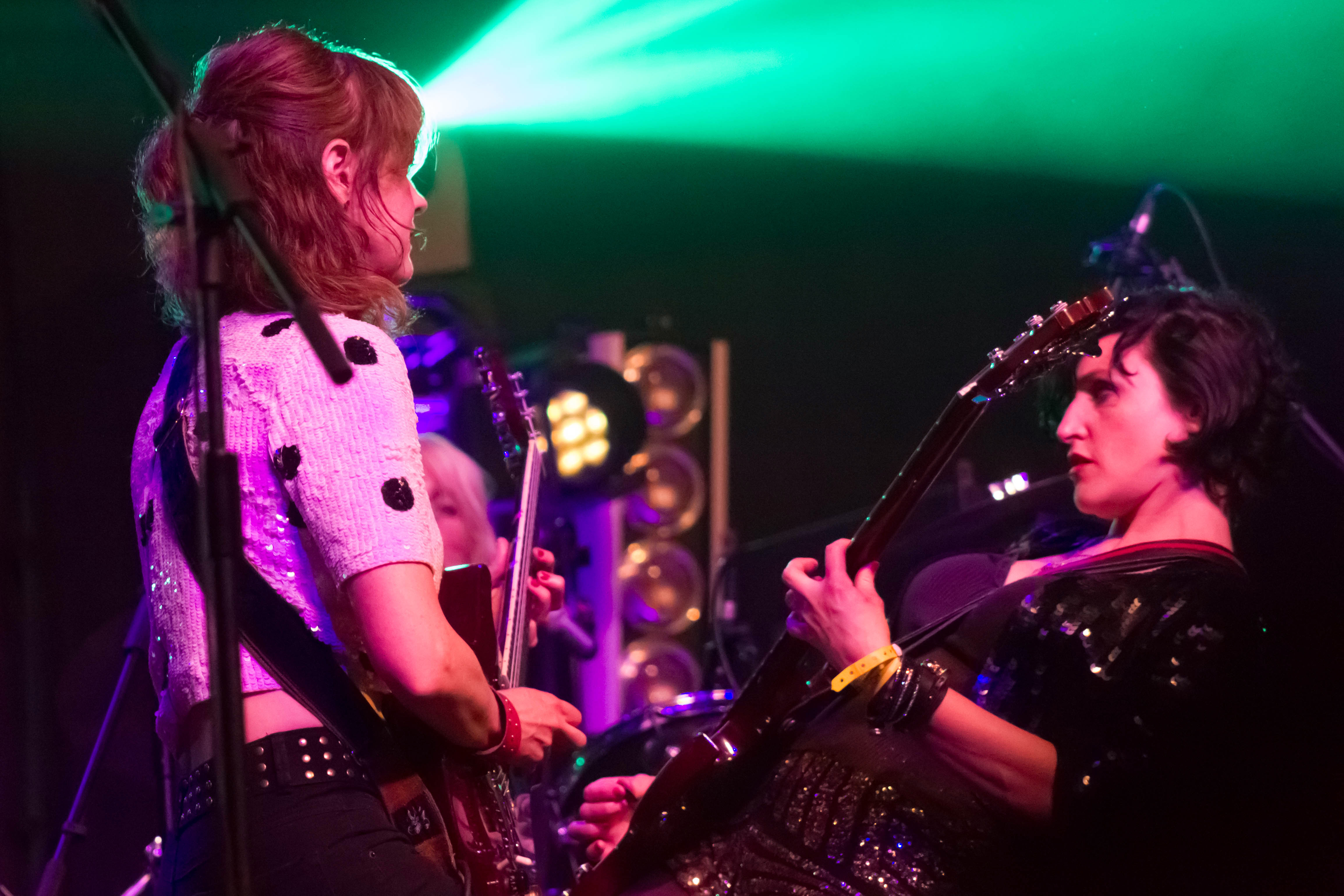
Ex Hex

- Electrelane (United Kingdom)
  - Debbie Ball, Mia Clarke, Rachel Dalley, Emma Gaze, Tracey Houdek, Ros Murray, Verity Susman
- Emily's Sassy Lime (United States)
  - Wendy Yao, Emily Ryan, Amy Yao
- Erase Errata (United States)
  - Ellie Erickson, Jenny Hoyston, Sara Jaffe, Bianca Sparta
- Everlife (United States)
  - Amber, Sarah and Julia Ross (sisters)
- eX-Girl (Japan)
  - Keikos, Kirilola, Yoko
- Ex Hex (United States)
  - Mary Timony, Betsy Wright, Laura Harris
- Exist Trace (Japan)
  - Jyou, Miko, Omi, Naoto and Mally.
- The Eyeliners (United States)
  - Lisa Baca, Laura Baca, Angela "Gel" Baca

== F ==
- Fabulous Disaster (United States)
  - Lynda Mandolyn, Squeaky, Sally Disaster, Lizzie Boredom, Cinder Block, Laura Litter
- The Faders (United Kingdom)
  - Molly Lorene, Toy Valentine, Cherisse Osei
- Fanny (United States) (1969–1975)
  - Nickey Barclay, Alice de Buhr, Jean Millington, June Millington, Patty Quatro, Brie Howard Darling, Cam Davis
- Fate Gear (Japan) (2015–)
  - Mina, Nana, Erika, et al.
- The Feminine Complex (United States) (1966–1969)
  - Mindy Dalton, Judi Griffith, Lana Napier, Pame Stephens, Jean Williams
- Femme Fatale (United States) (2013–2019)
  - Lorraine Lewis, Courtney Cox, Nita Strauss, Nikki Stringfield, Janis Tanaka, Rachael Rine, Athena Lee (Kottak), Katt Scarlett
- Fifth Column (Canada)
  - Caroline Azar, G.B. Jones, Anita Smith, Charlotte Briede, Beverly Breckenridge, Michelle Breslin, Donna Dresch, Torry Colichio
- Finally Punk (United States)
  - Erin Budd, Stephanie Chan, Veronica Ortuño, Elizabeth Skadden
- Fire Party (United States)
  - Amy Pickering, Natalie Avery, Kate Samworth, Nicky Thomas
- First Aid Kit (Sweden)
  - Klara Söderberg, Johanna Söderberg
- Fluffy (United Kingdom)
  - Angie Adams, Bridget Jones, Amanda Rootes, Helen Storer
- Flying Lesbians (Germany)
  - Danielle de Baat, Monika Jaeckel, Gigi (Christa) Lansch, Monika Mengel, Cillie Rentmeister, M.S., Christel Wachowski, Swetlana Freifrau von dem Bottlenberg
- Frau (United Kingdom); (Spain)
  - Ashley, Colette, Paula, Nuria
- Fräulein Wunder (Germany)
  - Jana Chantal Franziska Loch, Kerstin Klein, Stefanie Spänkuch, Pia Gottwals
- Frightwig (United States)
  - Deanna Ashley, Mia Levin, Cecilia Lynch, Megan Page, Rebecca Tucker

== G ==
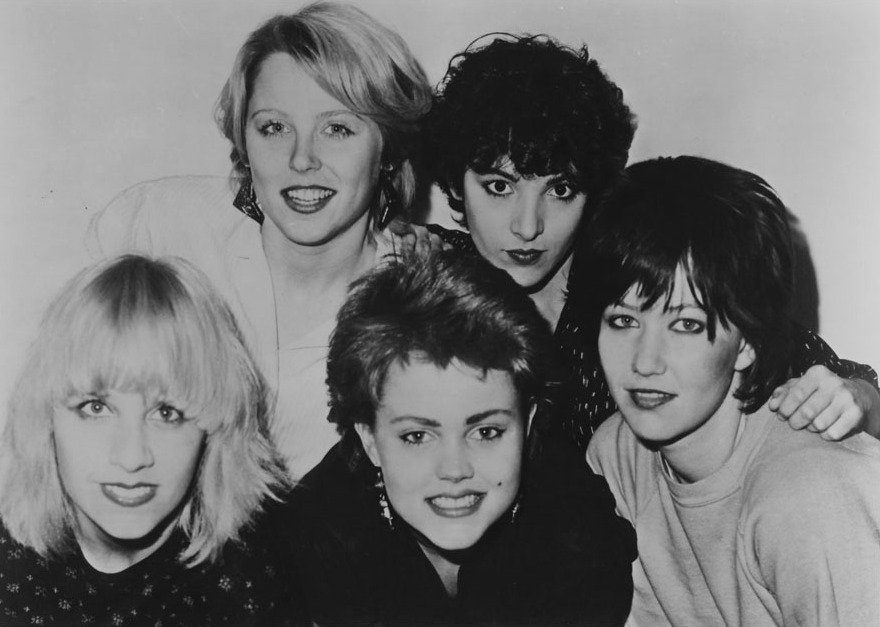
The Go-Go's

- Gacharic Spin (Japan)
  - F Chopper Koga, Tomo-zo, Hana, Oreo Reona, Mai
- Gallhammer (Japan)
  - Mika Penetrator, Vivian Slaughter, Risa Reaper
- The Girls (United States)
  - Diane, Rosemary, Sylvia and Margaret Sandoval
- Girlschool (United Kingdom)
  - Jackie Chambers, Denise Dufort, Kim McAuliffe, Enid Williams, Kelly Johnson, Gil Weston-Jones, Cris Bonacci, Jackie Bodimead, Tracey Lamb
- Girl in a Coma (United States)
  - Nina and Phanie Diaz, Jenn Alva
- Girl Monstar (Australia)
  - Sherry Valier, Anne McCue, Damian Child, Sue World
- Girl Ray (United Kingdom)
  - Poppy Hankin, Iris McConnell, Sophie Moss
- Gito Gito Hustler (Japan)
  - Yago, Mitsuko, Tae, Fusa
- Go Betty Go (United States)
  - Nicolette and Aixa Vilar, Betty Cisneros, Michelle Rangel
- Go-Bang's (Japan)
  - Kaori Moriwaka, Risa Tanishima, Mitsuko Saito
- The Go-Go's (United States)
  - Elissa Bello, Charlotte Caffey, Belinda Carlisle, Margot Olavarria, Gina Schock, Kathy Valentine, Jane Wiedlin
- Grass Widow (United States)
  - Hannah Lew, Raven Mahon, Lillian Marling
- The Gymslips (United Kingdom)
  - original line up: Suzanne Scott, Paula Richards, Karen Yarnell, Kathy Barnes

== H ==
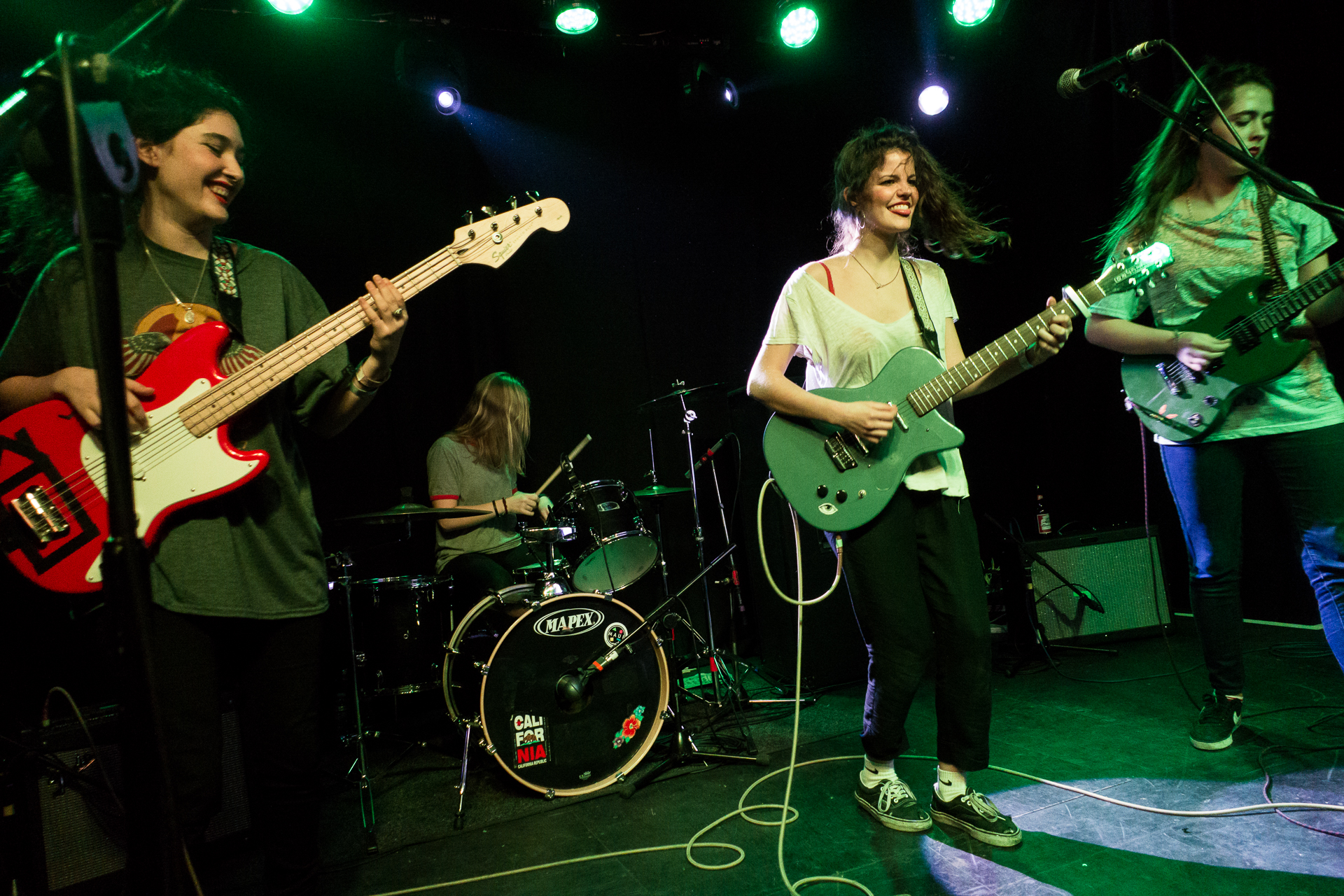
Hinds

- Haiku Salut (United Kingdom)
  - Gemma Barkerwood, Sophie Barkerwood, Louise Croft
- Haim (United States)
  - Este Haim, Danielle Haim, Alana Haim
- Halo Friendlies (United States)
  - Natalie Bolanos, Cheryl Hecht, Deanna Moody, Ginger Reyes, Claudia Rossi, Christina Theobold, Judita Wignall
- Hanabie. (Japan)
  - Yukina, Matsuri, Hettsu, Chika
- Hang On The Box (China)
  - Wang Yue, Yilina, Shenggy (Shi Lu)
- Harry Crews (United States)
  - Kim Gordon, Lydia Lunch, Sadie Mae
  - Linda Sanders, Debbie Sanders, Debbie McMillan, Jeannie Foster
- Heavens to Betsy (United States)
  - Tracy Sawyer, Corin Tucker
- Hepburn (United Kingdom)
  - Jamie Benson (vocals), Lisa Lister (guitar), Sarah Davies (bass), Beverley Fullen (drums)
- Hijas de Violencia (Mexico)
- Hinds (Spain)
  - Carlotta Cosials, Ana Perrote, Ade Martin, Amber Grimbergen
- The Holy Sisters of the Gaga Dada (United States)
  - Jill Fido, Mary Jean, Kim Sockit, Zero Jessephski Jr.
- Honeyblood (Scotland)
  - Stina Marie, Claire Tweeddale, Cat Myers
- Hump Back (Japan)
  - Momoko Hayashi, Pika, Misaki, Megu, Yukkii, 373, Setsuko, Kanna

== I ==
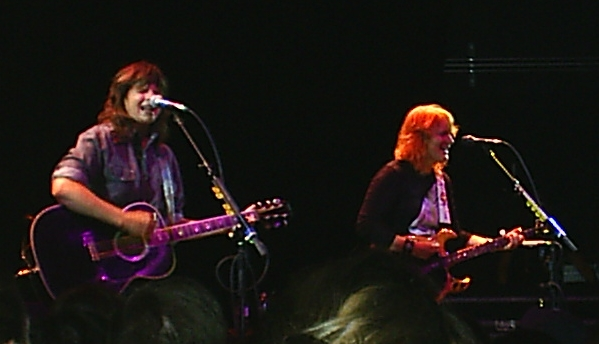
Indigo Girls

- Ibeyi (Cuba)
  - Lisa-Kaindé Diaz, Naomi Diaz
- Indica (Finland)
  - Johanna "Jonsu" Salomaa, Heini, Sirkku, Jenny, Laura
- Indigo Girls (United States)
  - Amy Ray, Emily Saliers
- International Sweethearts of Rhythm (United States)
  - Members inc. Pauline Braddy, Willie May Wong, Edna Williams, Helen Jones Woods; Bandleader: Anna Mae Winburn.
- Isis (United States)
  - Stella Bass, Ginger Bianco, Lollie Bienenfeld, Lauren Draper, Jeanie Fineberg, Suzi Ghezzi,
- Ivy Lies (New Zealand)
  - Emla Palmer, Lisa Blatchford, Rosie O'Connell, Mihka Chee

== J ==
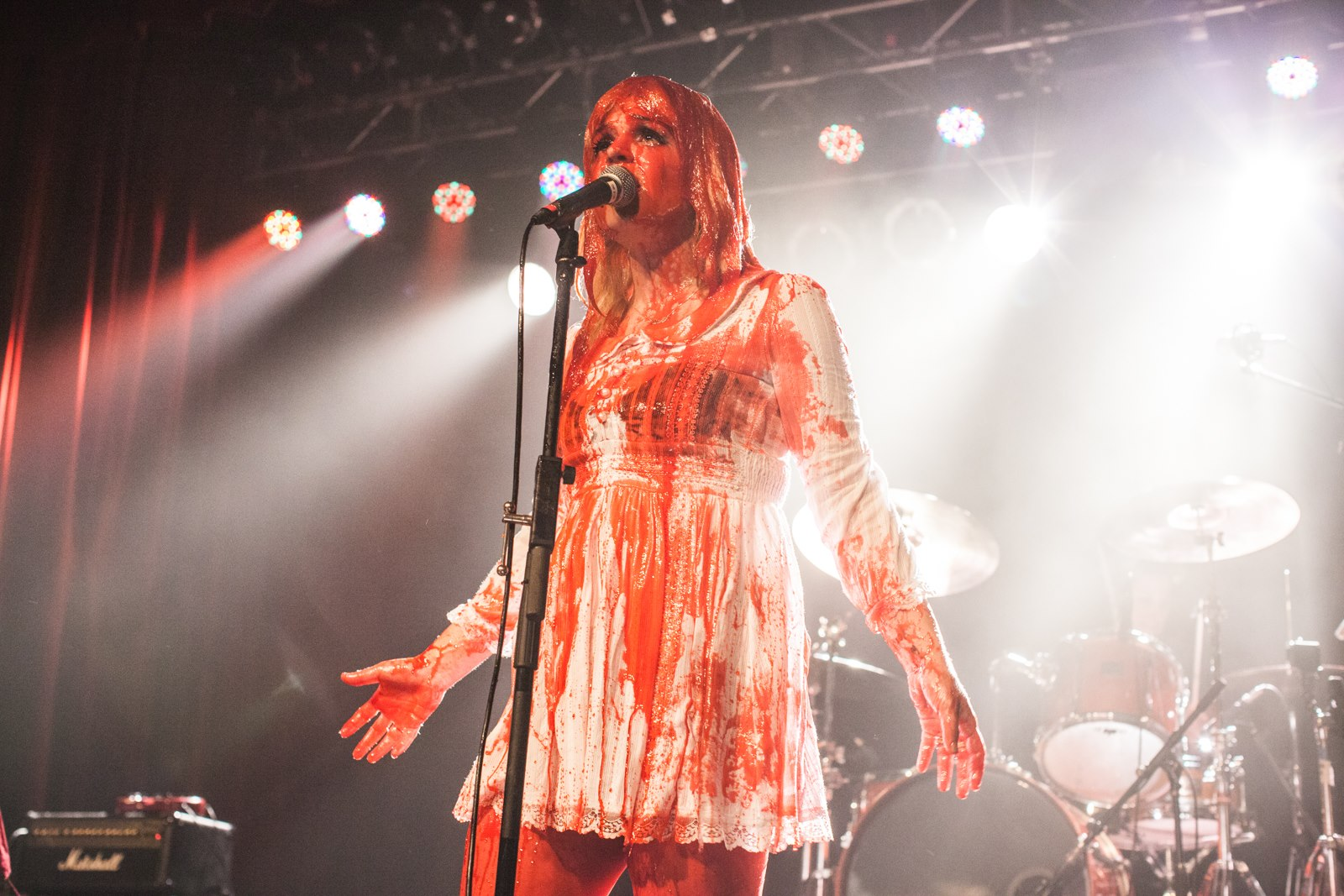
Jack Off Jill

- Jack Off Jill (United States)
  - Jessicka, Hellen Storer, Tenni Ah-Cha-Cha, Michelle Inhell
- The Jades (Ireland)
  - Sheila O'Sullivan, Elaine Weldon, Caroline Weldon, Yvonne O'Sullivan
- Jale (Canada)
  - Eve Hartling, Alyson MacLeod, Jennifer Pierce, Laura Stein
- Joseph (United States)
  - Natalie Closner Schepman, Allison Closner, Meegan Closner
- Junkyard Lipstick (South Africa)
  - Lucinda Villain, Louise Gorman, Robyn Bruwer, Jo-mariè Smit

== K ==
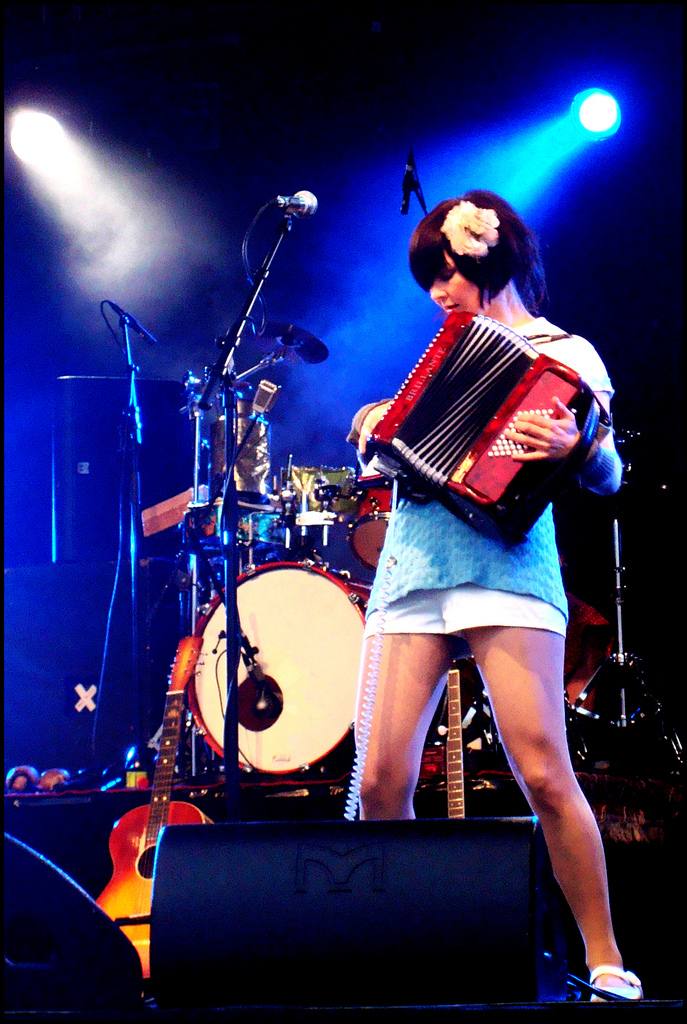
Katzenjammer

- Kælan Mikla (Iceland)
  - Laufey Soffía, Margrét Rósa Dóru-Harrýsdóttir, Sólveig Matthildur Kristjánsdóttir
- Katzenjammer (Norway)
  - Anne Marit Bergheim, Marianne Sveen, Solveig Heilo, Turid Jørgensen
- KeshYOU (Kazakhstan)
  - Kamshat Zholdybayeva, Aidana Medenova, Zhanar Dugalova et al.
- kis-kis (Russia)
  - Sofya Somuseva, Alina Olesheva
- Kitten Forever (United States)
  - Corrie Harrigan, Laura Larson, Liz Elton
- Kittie (Canada)
  - Morgan Lander, Mercedes Lander, Tara McLeod, Trish Doan, Talena Atfield, Jennifer Arroyo, Tanya Candler, Fallon Bowman, Lisa Marx, Ivana "Ivy" Vujic
- Klymaxx (United States)
  - Bernadette Cooper, Lorena Porter, Joyce Irby, Lynn Malsby, Robbin Grider, Cheryl Cooley
- Kostars (United States)
  - Vivian Trimble, Jill Cunniff
- KSM (United States)
  - Shelby Cobra, Katie Cecil, Sophia Melon, Shae Padilla and Kate Cabebe
- The Kut (United Kingdom)
  - Princess Maha, Diana Bartmann, Stella Vie

== L ==
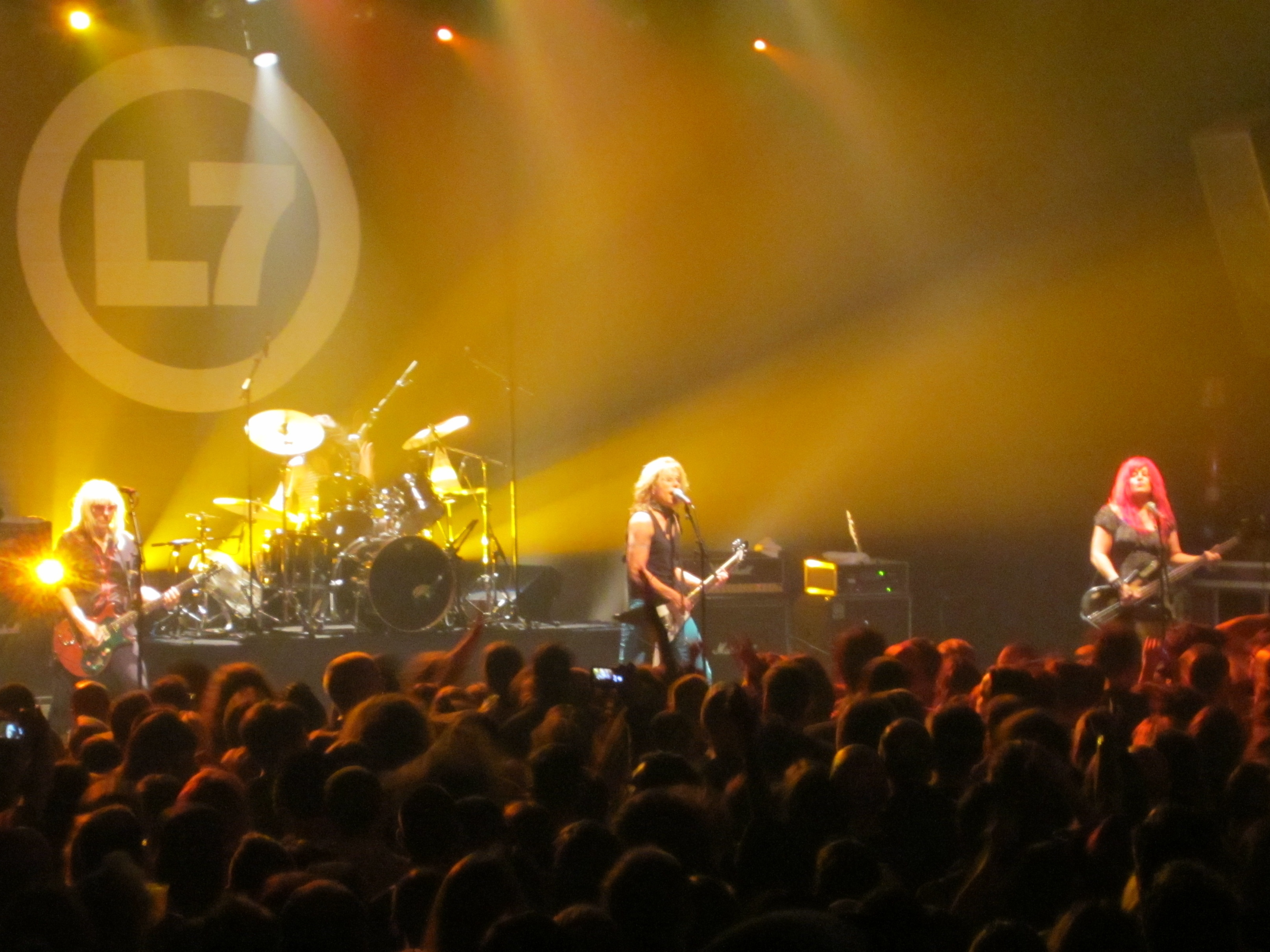
L7

- L7 (United States)
  - Donita Sparks, Suzi Gardner, Jennifer Finch, Demetra Plakas
- La Luz (United States)
  - Shana Cleveland, Alice Sandahl, Lena Simon
- L.A. Witch (United States)
  - Ellie English, Irita Pai, Sade Sanchez
- Lash (Australia)
  - Belinda-Lee Reid, Jaclyn Pearson, Jessica Bennett, Micaela
- The Last Dinner Party (United Kingdom)
  - Abigail Morris, Lizzie Mayland, Emily Roberts, Georgia Davies, Aurora Nishevci
- Latency (South Korea)
  - Heeyeon, Jeewon, Haeun, Hyunjin, Semi
- Le Tigre (United States)
  - Sadie Benning, Johanna Fateman, Kathleen Hanna, JD Samson
- Lesbians on Ecstasy (Canada)
  - Bernie Bankrupt, Fruity Frankie, Jackie the Jackhammer, Veronique Mystique
- Let's Eat Grandma (United Kingdom)
  - Jenny Hollingworth, Rosa Walton
- The Like (United States)
  - Charlotte Froom, Tennessee Thomas, Z. Berg
- LiLiPUT (originally, Kleenex; Switzerland) (1978–1983)
  - Angie Barrack, Crigle Freund, Lislot Ha, Marlene Marder, Klaudia Schiff
- The Linda Lindas (United States)
  - Bela Salazar, Eloise Wong, Lucia de la Garza, Mila de la Garza
- LiveonRelease (Canada)
  - Leah Emmott, Felicity Herst, Brittin Karroll, Colette Trudeau
- The Liverbirds (England)
  - Valerie Gell, Pamela Birch, Mary McGlory, Sylvia Saunders
- Lolita No.18 (Japan)
  - Aya, Ena, Masayo Ishizaka, Kim Rin
- Litsey (Russia)
  - Anastasia Makarevich, Daria Netunaeva, Anna Shchegoleva
- Look Blue Go Purple (New Zealand)
  - Kathy Bull, Norma O'Malley, Lesley Paris, Denise Roughan, Kath Webster
- Los Bichos (England)
  - Serra Petale, Agustina Ruiz, Josefine Jonsson, Nic Crawshaw
- The Lounge Kittens (England)
  - Zan Lawther, Timia Gwendoline, Jenny Deacon
- Lovendor (Japan)
  - Reina Tanaka, Marina Okada, Yuki Uozumi, Marin Miyazawa
- Lovebites (Japan)
  - Asami, Miho, Haruna, Midori, Miyako, Fami
- Lunachicks (United States)
  - Becky, Chip, Gina, Theo Kogan, Sindi, Squid
- Lung Leg (Scotland)
  - Jane McKeown, Annie Spandex, Amanda Doorbar, Maureen Quim
- Luscious Jackson (United States)
  - Jill Cunniff, Gabby Glaser, Kate Schellenbach, Vivian Trimble
- Luv'd Ones (United States)
  - Char Vinnedge, Chris Vinnedge, Mary Gallagher, Faith Orem

== M ==
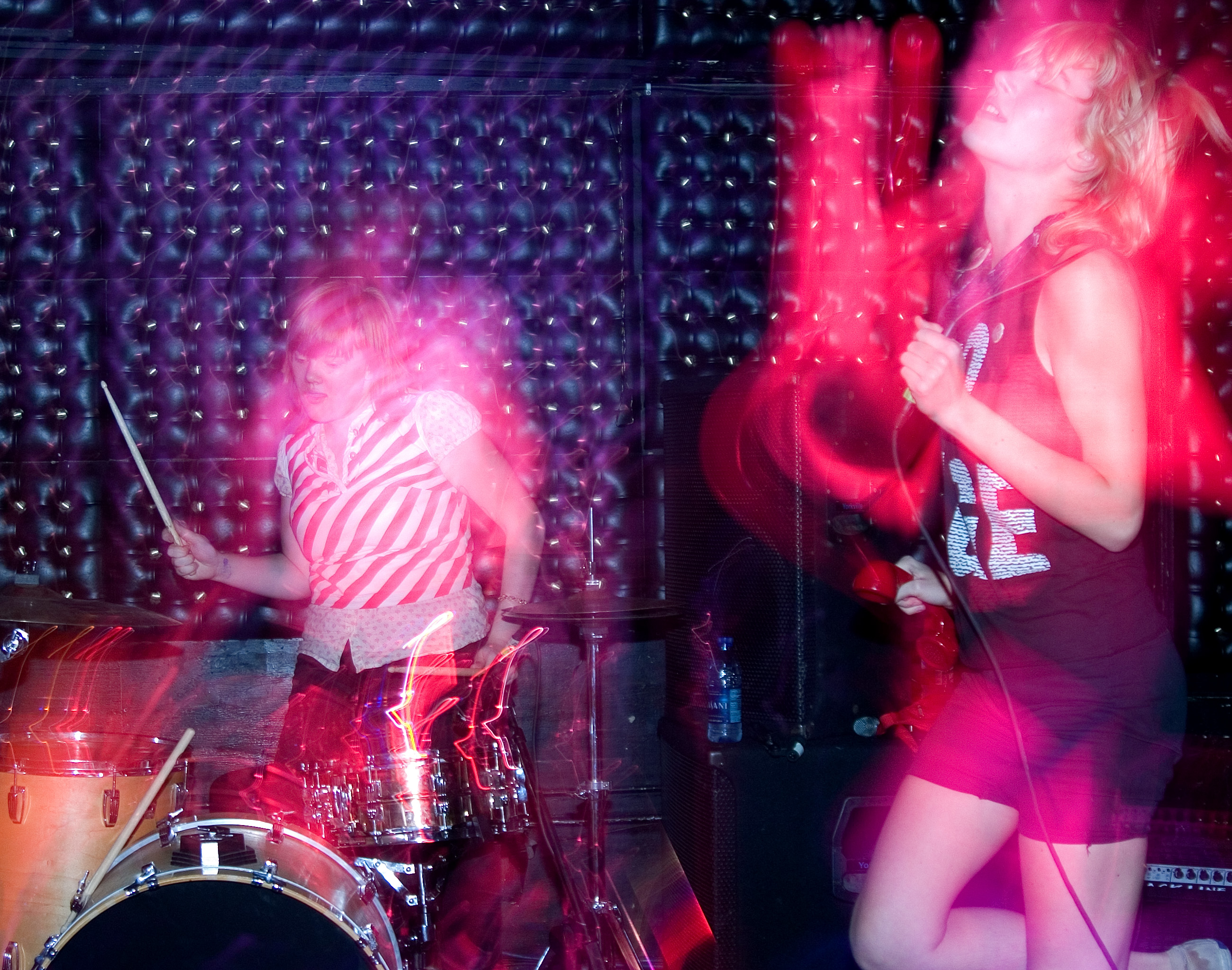
Mika Miko

- M2M (Norway)
  - Marion Elise Raven, Marit Elisabeth Larsen
- Madam X (as Hell's Belles, 1991; United States)
  - Lenita Erickson, Irene Wohlman, Roxy and Maxine Petrucci
- Magneta Lane (Canada)
  - Lexi Valentine, French, Nadia King
- Malaria! (Germany)
  - Gudrun Gut, Bettina Köster, Beate Bartel, Manon P. Duursma, Christine Hahn, Sussane Kuhnke
- Mambo Taxi (United Kingdom)
  - Lenie Mets, Delia Sparrow, Andrea Stallard, Karin Rapp, Ella Guru, Anjali Bhatia
- Maow (Canada)
  - Tobey Black, Neko Case, Corrina Hammond
- Marine Girls (United Kingdom)
  - Tracey Thorn, Jane Fox, Alice Fox, Gina Hartman
- Marsheaux (Greece)
  - Marianthi Melitsi, Sophie Sarigiannidou
- Mary's Blood (Japan)
  - Eye, Mari, Rio, Saki
- Meanstreak (band) (United States)
  - Marlene Apuzzo, Rena Sands, Bettina France, Lisa Pace, Diane Keyser
- Mediæval Bæbes (United Kingdom)
  - Maple Bee, Katharine Blake, Audrey Evans, Marie Findley, Emily Ovenden, Claire Rabbitt, Cylindra Sapphire
- Meet Me at the Altar (United States)
  - Edith Victoria, Ada Juarez, Téa Campbell (lineup from 2017 to 2025)
- The Micragirls (Finland)
  - Mari Halonen, Katariina Haapalainen, Kristiina Haapalainen
- Mika Miko (United States)
  - Jenna Thornhill, Jennifer Clavin, Michelle Suarez, Jessie Clavin, Kate Hall (lineup from 2005 to 2009)
- The Mo-dettes (United Kingdom)
  - Ramona Carlier, Jane Crockford, Kate Korus, June Miles-Kingston, Melissa Ritter
- Morfonica (Japan)
  - Mashiro Kurata (Amane Shindō), Tōko Kirigaya (Hina Suguta), Nanami Hiromachi (Yūka Nishio), Tsukushi Futaba (Mika), Rui Yashio (Ayasa)
- Mrs. Fun (United States)
  - Kim Zick, Connie Grauer
- The Murmurs (United States)
  - Heather Grody, Leisha Hailey, Sheri Ozeki, Sherri Solinger
- MT-TV (England)
  - Krow, Alex, Brooke, Fuse, Nikki, Jo
- MyGO!!!!! (Japan)
  - Tomori Takanatsu (Hina Yōmiya), Anon Chihaya (Rin Tateishi), Rāna Kaname (Hina Aoki), Soyo Nagasaki (Mika Kohinata), Taki Shiina (Coco Hayashi)

== N ==
- Nemophila (Japan)
- Nervosa (Founded in Brazil, features international members)
- Nice Horse (Canada)
  - Katie Rox, Brandi Sidoryk, Krista Wodelet, Tara McLeod
- NikitA (Ukraine)
  - Dasha Astafieva, Yulia Kavtaradze et al.
- Nisennenmondai (Japan)
  - Masako Takada, Yuri Zaikawa, Sayaka Himeno
- Nitocris (Australia)
  - Morgana Ancone, Jessamine Finlayson, Sara Graye, Andrea Stanway, Kira Taylor
- The Nixe (Netherlands)
  - Ilva Poortvliet, Nikki Meijerink, Marian De Beurs, Simone Luken
- Noodles (Japan)
  - Yoko, Ikuno, Junko, Ayumi
- Northern State (United States)
  - Hesta Prynn, Correne Spero, Robyn "Sprout" Goodmark
- Nots (United States)
  - Natalie Hoffman, Charlotte Watson, Alexandra Eastburn, Meredith Lones
- Nu Virgos (Ukraine)
  - Alena Vinnitskaya, Anna Sedokova, Nadezhda Granovskaya, Vera Brezhneva, Albina Dzhanabaeva et al.

== O ==
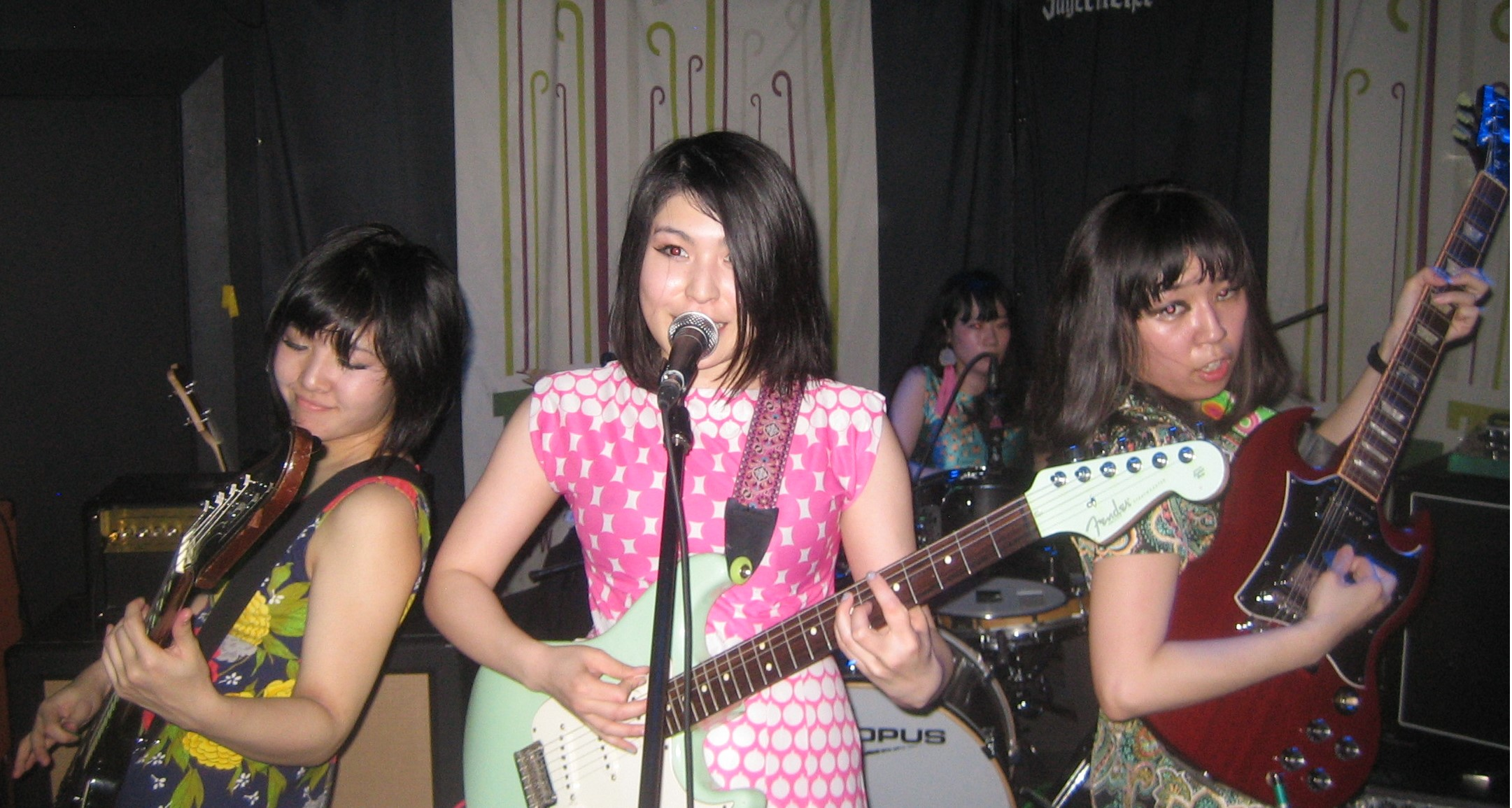
Otoboke Beaver

- Octavia Sperati (Norway)
  - Silje, Bodil, Gyri, Trine, Tone
- Östro 430 (Germany)
  - Martina Weith, Bettina Flörchinger, Anja Peterssen, Sandy Black
- OOIOO (Japan)
  - Yoshimi P-We, Kayan, Aya, Ai
- Oreskaband (Japan)
  - iCas, Hayami, Tomi, Tae, ADD, CC
- The Organ (Canada)
  - Katie Sketch, Jenny Smythe, Shelby Stocks, Shmoo Ritchie, Debra Cohen
- Otoboke Beaver (Japan)
  - Accorinrin, Yoyoyoshie, Hiro-Chan, Kahokiss

== P ==
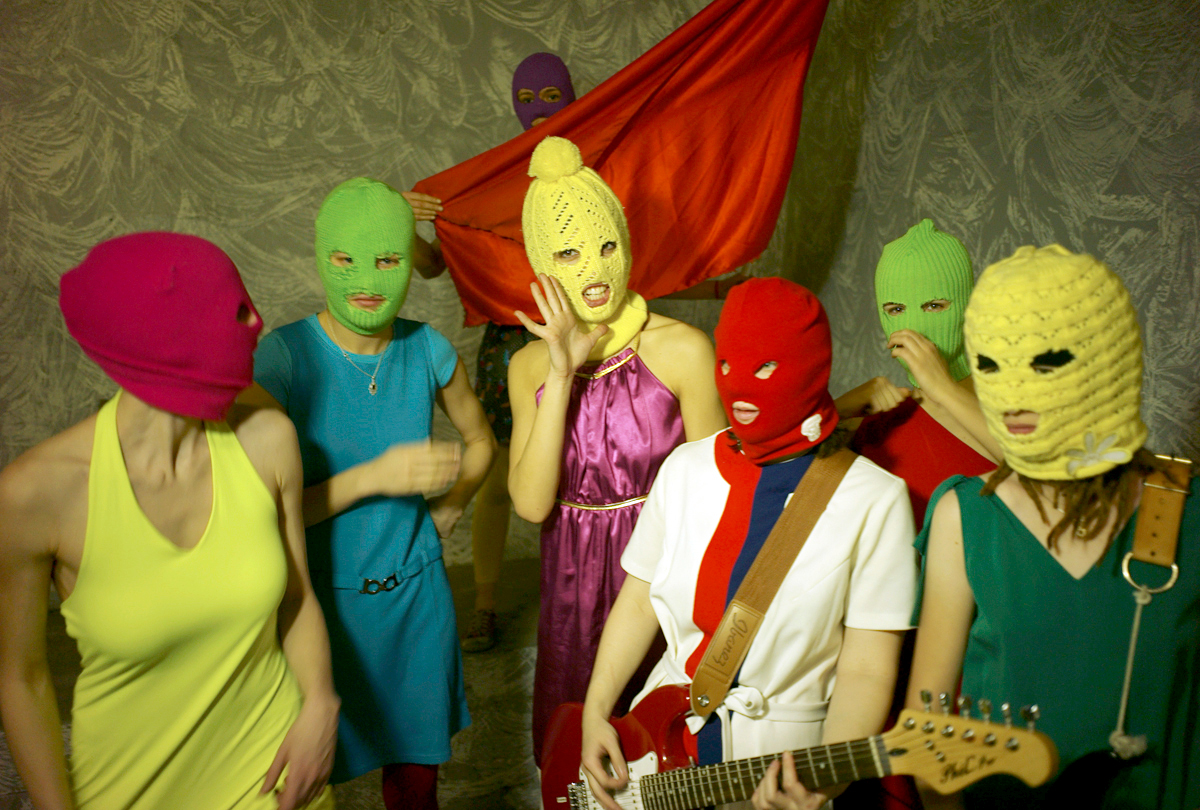
Pussy Riot

- The Pack A.D. (Canada)
  - Maya Miller, Becky Black
- The Pandoras (United States)
  - Paula Pierce, Gwynne Kahn, Karen Blankfeld, Melanie Vammen, Kim Shattuck, Bambi Conway, Lissa, Sheri, Casey, Lisa Black, Sheri Kaplan
- Payushchie Trusy (Ukraine)
  - Olha Lizgunova, Iryna Skrinnyk, Olena Slyusarenko
- Peaness (United Kingdom)
  - Carleia "Balla" Babenta, Jess Branney, Rach Williams
- Partyline (United States)
  - Allison Wolfe, Angela Melkisethian, Crystal Bradley
- The Peggies (Japan)
  - Yuuho Kitazawa, Makiko Ishiwata, Miku Onuki
- Phantom Blue (United States)
  - Gigi Hangach, Michelle Meldrum, Nicole Couch, Kim Nielsen, Linda McDonald.
- The Pierces (United States)
  - Catherine Pierce, Allison Pierce
- PINS (United Kingdom)
  - Faith Holgate, Lois McDonald, Anna Donigan, Sophie Galpin
- Plastiscines (France)
  - Katty Besnard, Marine Neuilly, Louise Basilien, Anoushka Vandevyvere
- The Pleasure Seekers/Cradle (United States)
  - Patti Quatro, Suzi Quatro, Arlean Quatro, Nancy Quatro, Darline Arnone, Nancy Ball, Mary Lou Ball, Diane Baker
- Plumtree (Canada)
  - Lynette Gillis, Carla Gillis, Amanda Braden, Catriona Sturton
- Pony Up (Canada)
  - Lisa J. Smith, Sarah Moundroukas, Laura Wills, Lindsay Wills (and formerly, Camilla Wynne Ingr)
- Poppin'Party (Japan)
  - Kasumi Toyama (Aimi), Tae Hanazono (Sae Ōtsuka), Rimi Ushigome (Rimi Nishimoto), Sāya Yamabuki (Ayaka Ōhashi), Arisa Ichigaya (Ayasa Itō)
- The Prettiots (United States)
  - Lulu Landolfi, Kay Kasparhauser
- Princess Princess (Japan)
  - Atsuko Watanabe (b), Kanako Nakayama (g), Kyoko Tomita (d), Tomoko Konno (k), Kaori Kishitani (v)
- The Priscillas (United Kingdom)
  - Jenny Drag (v), Guri Go-Go (g), Heidi Heelz (b), Lisa Lux (d)
- Problem Patterns (Northern Ireland)
  - Beverley Boal, Bethany Crooks, Alanah Smith, Ciara King
- Pussy Riot (Russia)
  - Nadezhda Tolokonnikova, Maria Alyokhina, Yekaterina Samutsevich, Taisia Krugovykh, et al.

== Q ==
- QWER (South Korea)
  - Chodan, Magenta, Hina, Siyeon

== R ==
- Rachel Rachel (United States)
  - Jennifer York, Cheryl Jewell, Heli Sterner, Brynn Beltran (Gersmehl), Jennifer Sparks, Robin Spurs
- The Raincoats (United Kingdom)
  - Vicky Aspinall, Gina Birch, Ana Da Silva, Palmolive, Ingrid Weiss
- Raise A Suilen (Japan)
  - Rei Wakana (Raychell), Rokka Asahi (Riko Kohara), Chiyu Tamade (Risa Tsumugi), Masuki Satō (Natsume), Reona Nyūbara (Reo Kurachi)
- Rasputina (United States)
  - Melora Creager, Julia Kent, Zoe Keating, Sarah Bowman, Kris Cowperthwaite, Agnieszka Rybska, Nana Bornant
- Ranetki (Russia)
  - Anna Rudneva, Anna Baydavletova, Zhenya Ogurtsova, Lena Tretyakova, Lera Kozlova, Natasha Milnichenko, Alina Petrova, Lena Galperina
- Razika (Norway)
  - Maria Amdam, Maria Råkil, Marie Moe, Embla Karidotter Dahleng
- Rebecca & Fiona (Sweden)
- Red Aunts (United States)
  - Terri Wahl, Kerry Davis, Debi Martini, Leslie Noelle
- Red Bacteria Vacuum (Japan)
  - Ikumi, Kassan (also formerly known as RanRan), Jasmine
- Red Molly (United States)
  - Laurie MacAllister, Abbie Gardner, Carolann Solebello (Solebello left August 19, 2010, replaced by Molly Venter)
- Red Poppy (China)
  - Group of female percussionists
- Reyna (United States) (2011–present)
  - Gabriela Banuelos, Victoriah Banuelos
- Rock Goddess (United Kingdom)
  - Jody Turner, Julie Turner, Tracey Lamb, Dee O'Malley
- Rolling Quartz (South Korea)
  - Iree, Arem, Jayoung, Yeongeun, Hyunjung
- Roselia (Japan)
  - Yukina Minato (Aina Aiba), Sayo Hikawa (Haruka Kudō), Lisa Imai (Yuki Nakashima), Ako Udagawa (Megu Sakuragawa), Rinko Shirokane (Kanon Shizaki). Former members Yurika Endō (as Lisa Imai), Satomi Akesaka (as Rinko Shirokane)
- The Runaways (United States)
  - Cherie Currie, Lita Ford, Jackie Fox, Joan Jett, Sandy West, Vicki Blue, Laurie McAllister, Micki Steele

== S ==
- Sahara Hotnights (Sweden)
  - Maria Andersson, Jennie Asplund, Johanna Asplund, Josephine Forsman
- Salem 66 (United States)
  - Judy Granwald, Elisabeth Kaplan, Susan Merriam
- Savages (United Kingdom)
  - Jehnny Beth, Gemma Thompson, Ayse Hassan, Fay Milton
- Scandal (Japan)
  - Haruna Ono, Tomomi Ogawa, Mami Sasazaki, Rina Suzuki
- Scarlet (United Kingdom)
  - Cheryl Parker, Jo Youle, Joanna Fox
- Scissor Girls (United States)
  - Azita Youssefi, Heather Melowic (a.k.a. Heather M.), Kelly Kuvo, Sue Zollinger
- Scrawl (United States)
  - Marcy Mays, Sue Harshe, Carolyn O'Leary, Dana Marshall
- Screaming Orphans (Ireland)
  - Joan Diver, Angela Diver, Joan Diver, Gráinne Diver
- Screamin' Sirens (United States)
  - Laura Bandit, Diane Dixon, Genny Schorr, Fur Dixon, Rosie Flores, Pleasant Gehman, Casey Gomez, Kathryn Grimm, Marsky Reins, Miiko Watanabe
- September Girls (Ireland)
  - Paula Cullen, Caoimhe Derwin, Lauren Kerchner, Jessie Ward, Sarah Grimes
- Serebro (Russia)
  - Elena Temnikova, Olga Seryabkina, Anastasia Karpova et al.
- Sexpod (United States)
- Shampoo (United Kingdom)
  - Jacqui Blake, Carrie Askew
- The Shaggs (United States)
  - Betty Wiggin, Dorothy Wiggin, Helen Wiggin, Rachel Wiggin
- Shakespears Sister (United Kingdom)
  - Siobhan Fahey, Marcella Detroit
- She Devils (Argentina)
  - Inés Laurencena, Patricia Pietrafesa, Pilar Arrese
- She Rockers (United Kingdom)
  - Donna McConnell, Alison Clarkson, Dupe Fagbesa, Antonia Jolly
- The She Trinity (Canada/United Kingdom)
  - Robyn Yorke, Shelley Gillespie, Sue Kirby, Pauline Moran, Marion Hill, Eileen Woodman, Janet Baily, Barbara Thompson, Beryl Marsden, Inger Jonnsson
- Shishamo (Japan)
  - Asako Miyazaki, Misaki Yoshikawa, Aya Matsuoka
- Shit & Chanel (Denmark)
  - Anne Linnet, Astrid Elbek, Lis Sørensen, Lone Poulsen and Ulla Tvede Eriksen.
- Shonen Knife (Japan)
  - Naoko Yamano, Atsuko Yamano, Risa Kawano (past members: Ritsuko Taneda, Emi Morimoto, Etsuko Nakanishi, Michie Nakatani, Mana Nishiura)
- Show-Ya (Japan)
  - Keiko Terada, Miki "sun-go" Igarashi, Miki "captain" Nakamura, Satomi Senba, Miki "mittan" Tsunoda
- Sick of Sarah (United States)
  - Abisha Uhl, Katie Murph, Jessie Farmer, Brooke Svanes, Jessica Forsythe
- Sidi Bou Said (United Kingdom)
  - Claire Lemmon, Gayl Harrison, Melanie Woods
- Silent Siren (Japan)
  - Sumire Yoshida, Yukako Kurosada, Aina Yamauchi, Hinako Umemura
- The Sixsters (Ukraine/Germany)
  - Maria Krutsenko, Anna Voloshyna, Katya Kuzyakina, Polina Zagnoi, Sofiia Chernova-Kurlykina
- Skinned Teen (United Kingdom)
  - Layla Gibbon, Flossy White, Esme Young
- Skinny Girl Diet (United Kingdom)
  - Delilah Holliday, Ursula Holliday
- Skulker (Australia)
  - Greer Skinner, Naomi Battah, Annette Harada, Angela Blackshaw
- Slant 6 (United States)
  - Christina Billotte, Marge Marshall, Myra Power
- Sleater-Kinney (United States)
  - Carrie Brownstein, Lora McFarlane, Corin Tucker, Janet Weiss
- The Slits (United Kingdom)
  - Ari Up, Palmolive, Viv Albertine, Tessa Pollitt
- Smoosh (United States)
  - Chloe, Asy (Asya), Maia
- Snatch (United States/United Kingdom)
  - Judy Nylon, Patti Palladin
- Some Girls (United States)
  - Heidi Gluck, Juliana Hatfield, Freda Love
- Spazzys (Australia)
  - Kat Spazzy, Lucy Spazzy, Ally Spazzy
- Spires That in the Sunset Rise (United States)
  - Kathleen Baird, Georgia Vallas, Taralie Peterson (Taralie Dawn), Tracy Peterson
- Spitboy (United States)
  - Michelle Gonzales, Adrienne Droogas, Paula, Karin Gembus
- Splendora (United States)
  - Janet Wygal, Tricia Wygal, Delissa Santos, Cindy Brolsma, Jennifer Richardson
- The Staves (United Kingdom)
  - Emily Stavely-Taylor, Jessica Stavely-Taylor, Camilla Stavely-Taylor
- Stealing Sheep (United Kingdom)
  - Rebecca Hawley, Emily Lansley, Lucy Mercer
- Stereopony (Japan)
  - Aimi, Nohana, Shiho
- Stonefield (Australia)
  - Amy, Hannah, Sarah, and Holly Findlay
- Super Junky Monkey (Japan)
  - Mutsumi ‘623’ Fukuhara, Keiko, Shinobu Kawai, Matsudaaahh
- Super Heroines (United States)
  - Eva O, Sandra Ross, Jill Emery
- The Surfrajettes (Canada)
  - Shermy Freeman, Nicole Damoff, Annie Lillis, Sarah Butler

== T ==
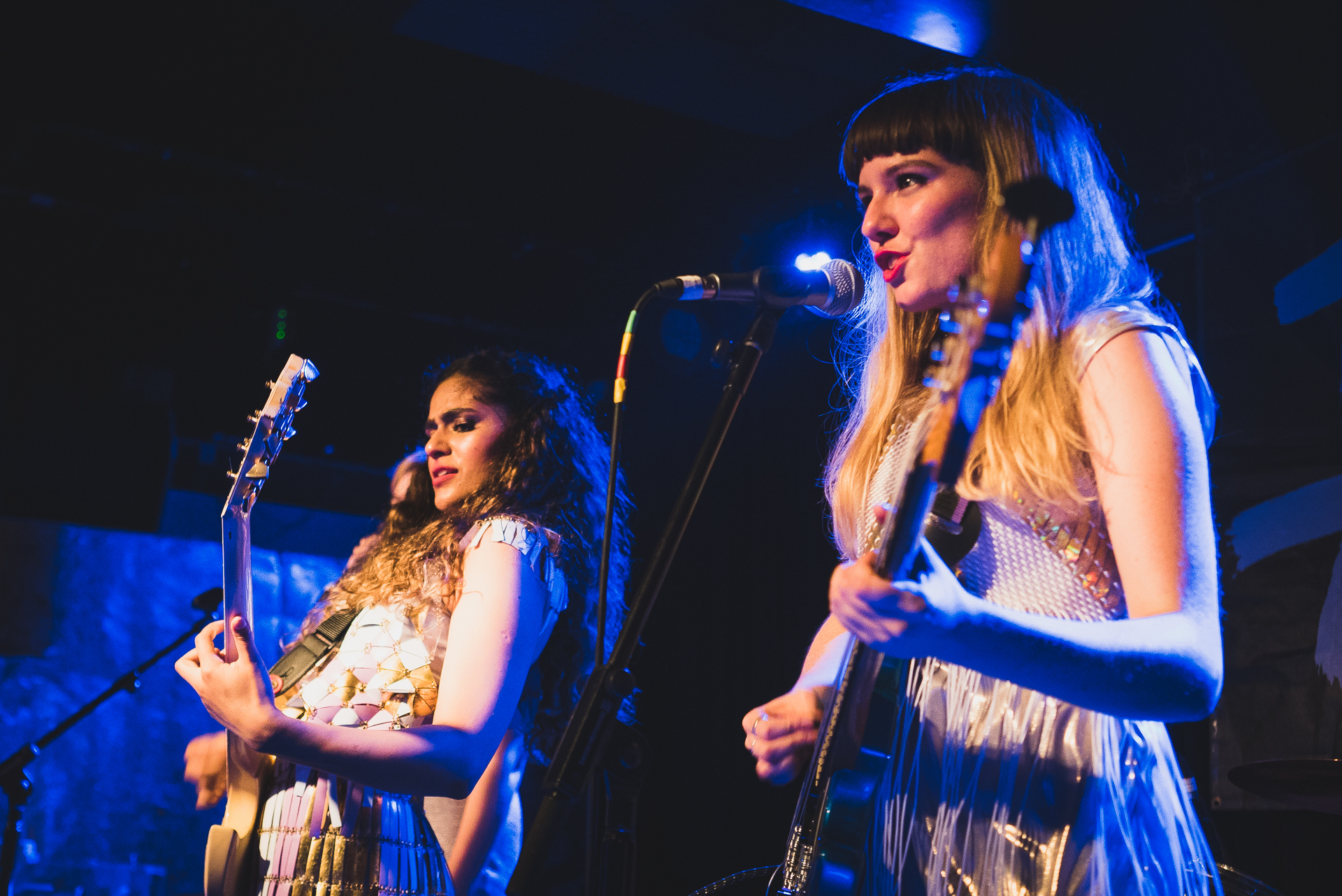
The Tuts

- Tattle Tale (United States)
  - Jen Wood, Madigan Shive
- Team Dresch (United States)
  - Jody Bleyle, Donna Dresch, Kaia Wilson, Marci Martinez, Melissa York
- Teen Jesus and the Jean Teasers (Australia)
  - Anna Ryan, Neve van Boxsel, Scarlett McKahey, Jaida Stephenson, Pip Gazard
- Teenage Joans (Australia)
  - Tahlia Borg, Cahli Blakers
- Tegan and Sara (Canada)
  - Tegan Quin, Sara Quin
- Thee Headcoatees (United Kingdom) (1991–1999)
  - Holly Golightly, Kyra LaRubia, Ludella Black, Debbie Green
- The Third Sex (United States)
  - Trish Walsh, Peyton Marshall
- The Warning (Mexico)
  - Daniela Villarreal, Paulina Villarreal, Alejandra Villarreal
- Thunderbugs (United Kingdom)
  - Brigitta Jansen, Nicky Shaw, Stef Maillard, Jane Vaughan
- Thunderpussy (United States)
  - Molly Sides, Whitney Petty, Leah Julius, Ruby Dunphy
- The Trashwomen (United States)
  - Tina Lucchesi, Danielle Pimm, Elka Zolot
- Those Dancing Days (Sweden)
  - Linnea Jönsson, Cissi Efraimsson, Mimmi Evrell, Rebecka Rolfart, Lisa Pyk Wirstrom
- Thug Murder (Japan)
  - Ryoko Naitoh, Chisato Ohtsubo, Yurie Sakuma
- Tijuana Sweetheart (United States)
  - Hellion, LoWreck, Julie TwoTimes, Smokey; Former Members: Elena, Leeanne, Scrotch, Ivhanna Rock
- Tiktak (Finland)
  - Emilia "Emppu" Suhonen, Mirjami "Mimmu" Hyvönen, Nea Mokkila, Petra Mauria, Tuuli Taimi, Noora Puhakka
- Tribe 8 (United States)
  - Lynn Breedlove, Leslie Mah, Jen Rampage, Mama T
- The Tuts (United Kingdom)
  - Nadia Javed, Beverley Ishmael, Harriet Doveton
- TsuShiMaMiRe (Japan)
  - Mari Kono, Yayoi Tsushima, Asami Suzuki, Mizue Masuda, Maiko Takagi
- Twelve Girls Band (China)
  - Qin Zijing, Yu Qiushi, Jin Jing, Luo Pianpian, Shi Juan, Zhong Bao, Zang Xiaopeng, Chen Xuejiao, Liao Binqu, Sun Lili, Tian Chao, Zhang Jing, Ma Ya Jing, Yu Qiuxuan, Tang Xiaoyuan
- Two Nice Girls (United States)
  - Pam Barger, Barbara Cole, Laurie Freelove, Meg Hentges, Kathy Korniloff, Gretchen Phillips

== U ==
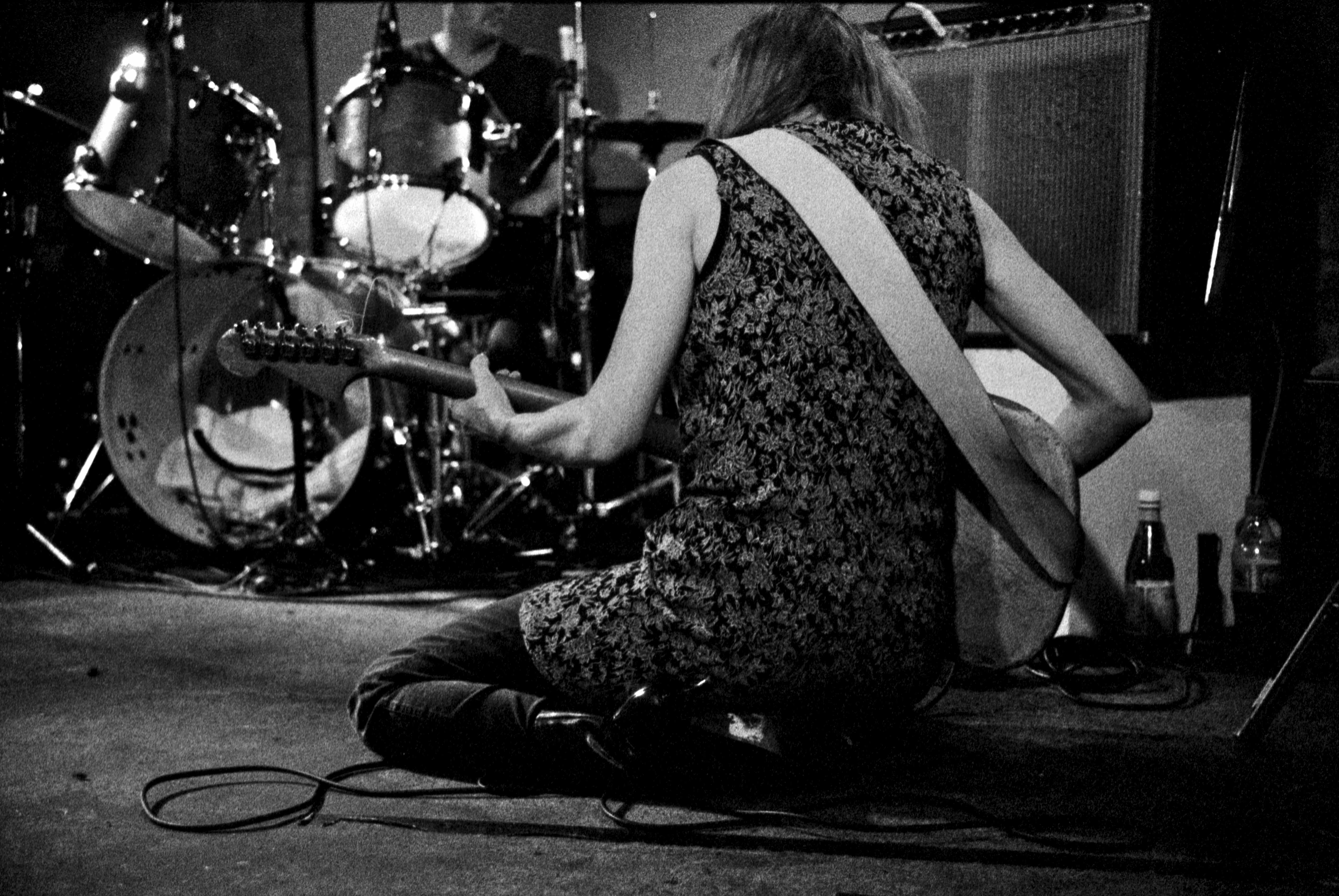
Ut

- Uh Huh Her (United States)
  - Leisha Hailey, Camila Grey
- Uncle Earl (United States)
  - KC Groves, Abigail Washburn, Rayna Gellert, Kristin Andreassen
- Upset (United States)
  - Ali Koehler, Lauren Freeman, Patty Schemel, Rachel Gagliardi
- Urban Symphony (Estonia)
  - Sandra Nurmsalu, Mann Helstein, Johanna Mängel, Mari Möldre
- Ut (United States/United Kingdom)
  - Jacqui Ham, Sally Young, Nina Canal

== V ==
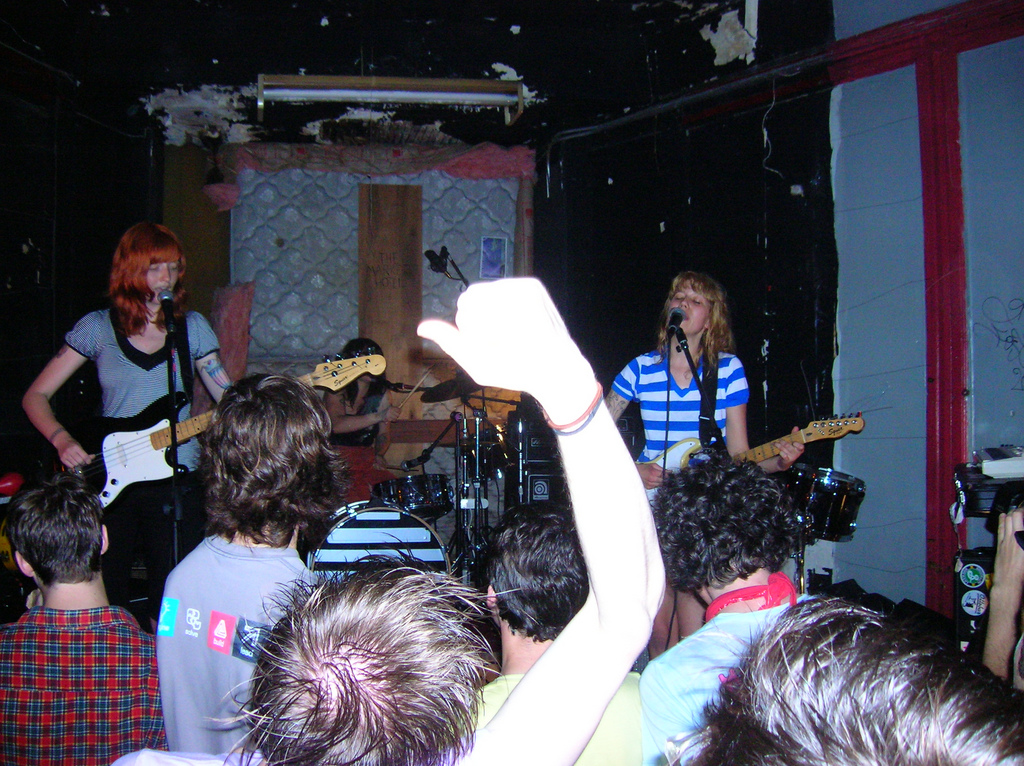
Vivian Girls

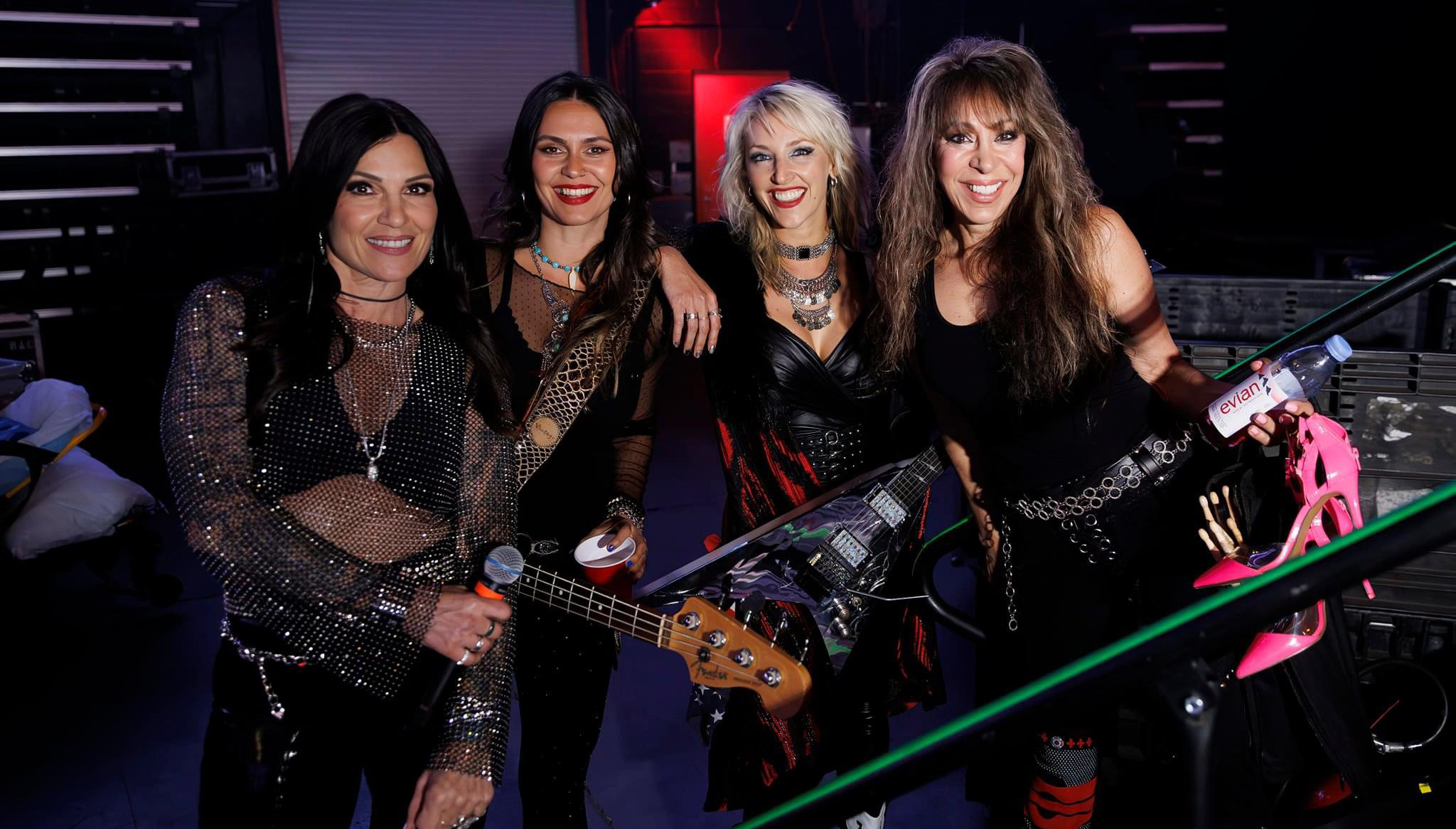
Vixen

- Vanilla Ninja (Estonia)
  - Lenna Kuurmaa, Piret Järvis, Katrin Siska, Maarja Kivi, Triinu Kivilaan
- Vesna (Czech Republic)
  - Patricie Fuxová, Bára Šůstková, Olesya Ochepovskaya, Markéta Vedralová, Tanita Yankova, Tereza Čepková
- Viuda e hijas de Roque Enroll (Argentina)
  - Mavi Díaz, María Gabriela Epumer, Claudia Ruffinatti, Claudia Sinesi
- Vivian Girls (United States)
  - Cassie Ramone, Kickball Katy, Ali Koehler, Frankie Rose
- Vixen (United States)
  - Janet Gardner, Jan Kuehnemund, Share Pedersen (Ross), Roxy Petrucci (Jones), Maxine Petrucci, Gina Stile, Brittany "Britt Lightning" Denaro, Kathrin Kraft, Lynn Louise Lowrey, Jenna Piccolo (Sanz-Agero), Tamara Ivanov, Pia Maiocco, Laurie Hedlund, Lorraine Lewis, Julia Lage, Rosa Laricchiuta
- Voice of Baceprot (Indonesia)
  - Firda Marsya Kurnia, Widi Rahmawati, Euis Siti Aisyah
- Von Iva (United States)
  - Jillian Iva Meador, Rebecca Kupersmith, Kelly Harris
- Voodoo Queens (United Kingdom)
  - Anjali Bhatia, Ella Drauglis, Angela Bhasler, Rajru Bhatia, Stefania
- Vulpes (Spain)
  - Loles Vázquez «Anarkoma Zorrita», Mamen Rodrigo «Evelyn Zorrita», Begoña Astigarraga «Ruth Zorrita», Lupe Vázquez «Pigüy Zorrita»

== W ==
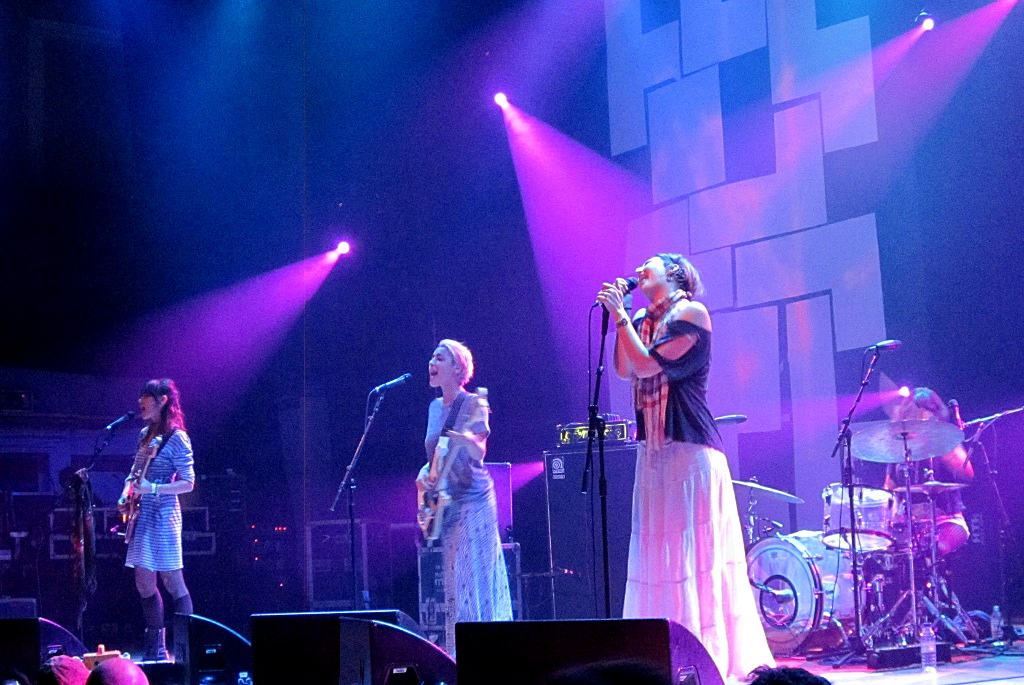
Warpaint

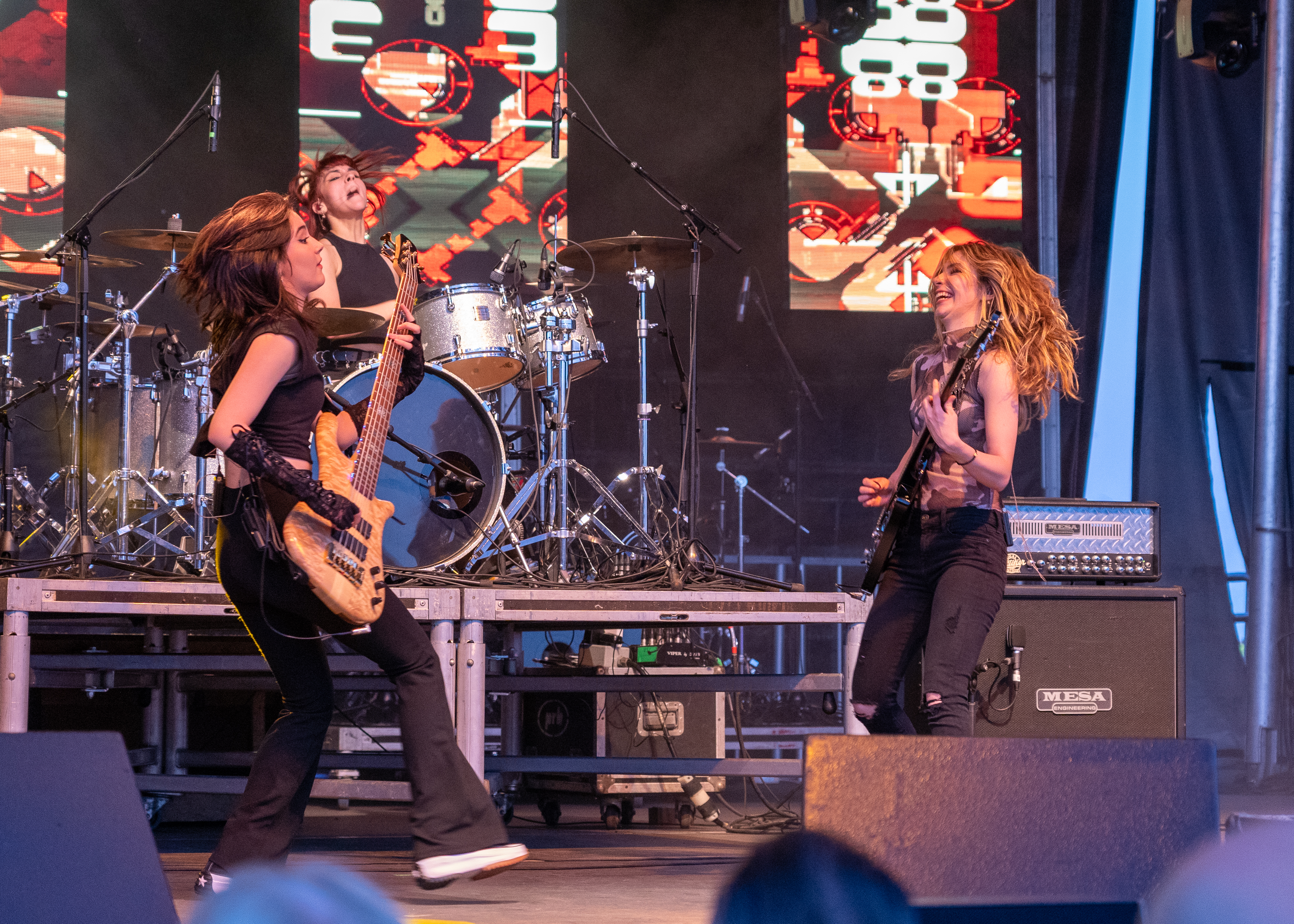
The Warning

- The Wailin' Jennys (Canada)
  - Nicky Mehta, Ruth Moody, Heather Masse
- The Warning (Mexico)
  - Daniela Villareal, Paulina Villareal, Alejandra Villareal
- Warpaint (United States)
  - Emily Kokal, Jenny Lee Lindberg, Stella Mozgawa, Theresa
- We've Got a Fuzzbox and We're Gonna Use It (United Kingdom)
  - JoAnn, Maggie, Tina, Vicky
- Whiteberry (Japan)
  - Yuki, Aya, Yukari, Rimi, Erika
- The Whoreshoes (United States)
  - Diana Greenberg, Lala Hulse, Camilla Lincoln, Joni Rueter, Emily Stucky
- Wild Flag (United States)
  - Carrie Brownstein, Rebecca Cole, Mary Timony, Janet Weiss
- Wild Rose (United States)
  - Pamela Gadd, Kathy Mac, Pam Perry, Nancy Given Prout, Wanda Vick
- The Wimmins' Institute (United Kingdom)
  - Jennifer Denitto, Cassie Fox, Melissa Reardon, Deborah van der Geugten
- Wishing Chair (United States)
  - Miriam Davidson, Kiya Heartwood
- Witch Club Satan (Norway)
  - Johanna Holt Kleive, Nikoline Spjelkavik, Victoria Røising

== Y ==
- Y Pants (United States)
  - Barbara Ess, Virginia Piersol, Gail Vachon

== Z ==
- Zelda (Japan)
  - Sachiho Kojima, Sayoko Takahashi, Yōko Suzuki, Kuniko Nozawa, Fukie Ishihara, Ako Ozawa, Naomi Motomura
- Zone (Japan)
  - Miyu Nagase, Mizuho Saito, Maiko Sakae, Tomoka Nishimura

== See also ==
- List of girl groups
