= Cake Shop NYC =

Music venue and bar in New York City

Coordinates: 40°43′15″N 73°59′17″W

Cake Shop
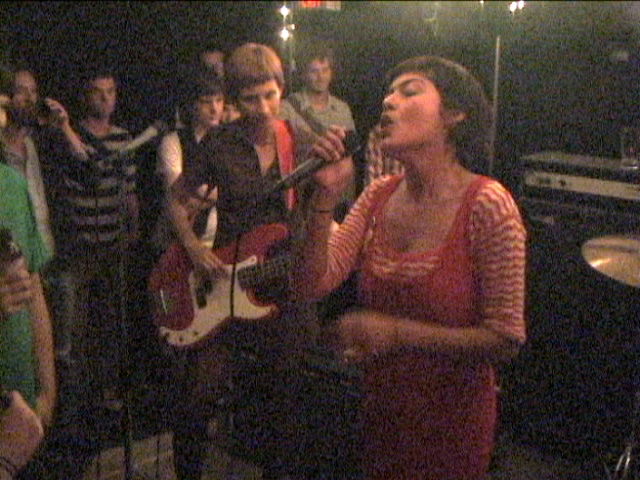
- Finally Punk performing at Cake Shop NYC in 2006
- Interactive map of Cake Shop
- Address: 152 Ludlow Street
- Location: New York, New York, United States
- Owner: Andrew Bodor, Nick Bodor, Gregory Curley
- Seating type: Bar and table seating
- Type: Nightclub and cafe

Website
- cake-shop.com

Cake Shop was a New York City music venue, bar, and cafe on the Lower East Side of Manhattan that opened in 2005. Located at 152 Ludlow Street between Stanton Street and Rivington Street, Cake Shop offered a full bar and records for sale. However, it was best known as a rock club, hosting new and upcoming bands, as well as established acts almost nightly in its basement.

Considered a crucial stop on the national tour circuit, Cake Shop was regarded as one of the few venues left in Manhattan open to hosting "independent underground pop music" produced by bands considered too limited in appeal to perform elsewhere. Co-owner Nick Bodor referred to Cake Shop's booking policy as follows: “We are not going to book something unless we believe it’s at least interesting.” Established groups like Vampire Weekend, The Dirty Projectors, and The Pains of Being Pure at Heart have credited Cake Shop with helping them kickstart their respective music careers.

Due to rising costs associated with the neighborhood's gentrification and issues of sustainability related to the venue's "long running" business model, the owners decided to close at the end of 2016. Cakeshop's final week was marked by nightly shows and special events. December 31, 2016 was Cakeshop's final night in operation.
