= Six Pack (band) =

Serbian band

Background information
- Origin: Smederevska Palanka, Serbia
- Genres: Punk Rock, Pop Punk
- Years active: 1994 – present
- Labels: Kontra Kultura, Start Today Records, ITTM, Dirty Old Town, C.R.A.S.H., Wild Cat Studio Multimedia Records
- Members: Milan Radojević; Miloš Novaković; Đorđe Paligorić; Branko Mitrović
- Past members: Dragan Bojić; Vladimir Čupić; Saša Bogdanović; Miloš Marković
- Website: www.sixpackserbia.com

Six Pack is a Serbian punk rock/pop punk band from Smederevska Palanka.

== History ==
=== 1990s ===
The band was formed in early 1993 by Branko Mitrović (guitar), Milan Radojević (vocals at that time), Dragan Bojić "Bojke" (guitar), Saša Bogdanović "Bogda" (vocals), Miloš Novaković (drums) and Vladimir Čupić "Čupa" (bass), and got the name by the Black Flag song of the same name.

The band recorded their first eight-song demo during the late 1994, and released it independently on the compact cassette Berza bez granica (Stock without Borders). In April 1995, the band performed in Athens and Thessaloniki, meeting bands from punk rock scenes of other countries, and, encouraged with the experience, they started recording their debut studio album. Pretnja ili molitva (Threat or Prayer), produced by Bojan Antunović and released through Kontra Kultura records, featured ten songs, including a cover version of a Mutha's Day Out song, written by guitarist Branko Mitrović, with lyrics in Serbian language entitled "Vodite me" (Take Me).

In early 1996, guitarist Bojić left the band and was replaced by Milan Radojević. The new lineup recorded the band's second album, Fabrička greška (Factory Error), produced by Pacca The Zoom and released by Start Today Records. The album included a cover version of the Culture Club song "Karma Chameleon" and the song "Crveni makovi" ("Red Poppy") featured the lyrics of an anti-fascist song written by Nikola Hercigonja. Fabrička greška, and, a year later, the second album was rereleased on CD by ITTM records. The material from both the first and the second album was released on CD by the Croatian record label Dirty Old Town.

In Summer of 1998, the band performed at the Ex YU Rock festival, along with the bands from the former Yugoslav republics, held at Bugojno, Bosnia and Herzegovina. After the festival, the band made a deal with the Sarajevo band Peep to go on a tour to Netherlands. Inspired not only by touring, but also by the current political situation in FR Yugoslavia, the band wrote new material which appeared on the band's third album Minut ćutanja (Moment of Silence) featuring a new bassist, Đorđe Paligorić. The album, featuring fifteen songs, was recorded from winter until spring of 2000 at the Češnjak studio, and, as the previous album, was produced by Pacca The Zoom. A cover version of the Riblja Čorba song "Na zapadu ništa novo" ("All Quiet on the Western Front") appeared on the album.

=== 2000s ===
In 2000, the band's version of "Karma Chameleon" was released on a various artists compilation Back Up The Balkans released by the Netherlands record label C.R.A.S.H.. During the Summer of the same year, the band went on a tour to Bosnia and Herzegovina with the bands Debeli Precjednik from Osijek and Revolt from Banja Luka. The tour ought to have included Croatia, but due to problems, it was dropped out. It was in 2004 that the band went on a Croatian tour, and in Zagreb, the band performed in front of the audience of about five thousand people.

In 2005, the band released the album Musique, produced by Block Out member Nikola Vranjković. The album featured guest appearance by Bajaga i Instruktori member Žika Milenković on the cover version of Bajaga i Instruktori track "Francuska ljubavna revolucija" ("French Love Revolution"), renamed to "La Musique". In 2008, the band released Discover, a cover album featuring cover versions of the band members' favorite songs, mainly from the 1980s, recorded during the summer of 2007 at the Plus studio in Smederevska Palanka.

=== 2010s ===
In 2011, the band released their fifth studio album, Epicentar (Epicenter). The album, produced by Pacco Milekić, is available for free download at the band's official website.

In 2015, the band celebrated 20 years of activity with concerts in Belgrade club Božidara, held on April 3, and Novi Sad club The Quarter, held on November 14. In September of the same year, the bend released the single "Bože, ćuvaj premijera" ("God Save the Prime Minister"), dedicated to Prime Minister of Serbia Aleksandar Vučić.

== Discography ==
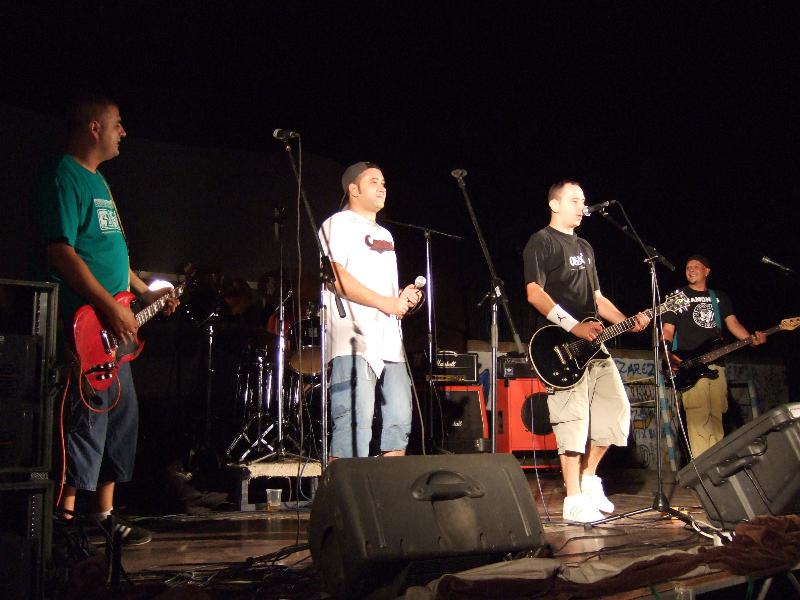
Six Pack performing live in 2007

=== Studio albums ===
Title	Released
Pretnja ili molitva	1995
Fabrička greška	1996
Minut ćutanja	2000
La Musique	2004
Discover	2008
Epicentar	2011

=== Singles ===
Title	Released
"Karma Chameleon"	1998
"Bože čuvaj premijera"	2015
"Ubica moga sna"	2018
"Trash"	2022
"UA!"	2023
