= The Holy Sisters of the Gaga Dada =

American band

- Origin: Santa Cruz, California, US
- Years active: 1981–c.1989
- Label: BOMP!
- Past members: Jill Fido; Wild Kim Sockit; Mary Jean Shaffer; Zero Jessephski Jr.; Cathy Linstrom; Blancah Black; Heidi Puckett; Jeff Grubic; Charles Bingham

The Holy Sisters of the Gaga Dada were an eclectic band originally from Santa Cruz, California, US, formed in 1981. They were voted "Best Alternative Rock Band of the Year" by LA Weekly. The collaboration of keyboardist Mary Jean Shaffer and guitarist Blancah Black, the Holy Sisters included quasi-religious imagery and feminist politics. Other original members included Heidi Puckett (bass) and Jeff Grubic (tenor sax). As the band morphed from conceptual entity to frequent club performers, Black left and two new members were added, Jill Fido (bass) and Charles Bingham (drums). Kim Sockit later replaced Puckett, and Zero Jessephski Jr. replaced Bingham, making the Holy Sisters of the Gaga Dada an all-female band. The group would later move to Hollywood, California, where they were featured in "Once Upon Her Time", a TV program about women in the 1980s which aired on the Lifetime Cablevision Network.

== Personnel ==
- Jill Fido: bass, Vocals
- Wild Kim Sockit: guitar, percussion, penny whistle, vocals
- Mary Jean Shaffer: keyboards, vocals
- Zero Jessephski Jr.: drums, toys, percussion
- Cathy Linstrom: guitar

== Discography ==
- Let's Get Acquainted (1986; Bomp! Records)
- At Dianne's Place (compilation; includes "Round and Round") (1987; Penultimate Records)
- Gaga at the Gogo EP (1988; Bomp! Records)
- Radio Tokyo Tapes Vol. 4 (compilation; includes one song, a cover version of "Paranoid" by Black Sabbath) (1989; Chameleon Records)

== See also ==
- List of all-women bands
