= Hijas de Violencia =

Mexican performance art group

- Origin: Mexico City, Mexico
- Genres: Punk rock
- Years active: 2013-
- Website: facebook

Las Hijas de Violencia is a Mexican performance art group based in Mexico City, Mexico. Their work combines punk rock and performance art to combat street harassment. A video of their work, produced by AJ+, went viral in early 2016. In the video, Hijas de Violencia encounter street harassment and respond by firing confetti guns at the harassers and then sing "Sexista Punk."

== Assessment ==
Their performances are noted for their playfulness, confrontation, and pointed critique. According to Natalie Delgadillo of CityLab:

Their performances are an interesting mixture of serious confrontation and lighthearted play. They may be going up against their harassers, but the women look downright joyful while they do it, smiling at one another and jumping around as they sing. That sense of play goes right down to the group’s name, which is a nod to the violence they’re confronting, but also a play on the name of Violencia Rivas, a character played by Argentinian comedian Peter Capusotto, who calls herself the mother of punk.

Though two of the founding members, Ana Beatriz and Ana Karen, identify primarily as actresses, rather than musicians, Las Hijas de Violencia cite Pussy Riot as a major influence.
