= Ajaqa =

Australian R&B band

- Also known as: Ajaga; Ajaqua
- Origin: Sydney, New South Wales, Australia
- Genres: R&B
- Labels: Transistor/BMG
- Past members: Catherine Ajaka; Erica Ajaka; Mary Ajaka; Tracy Ajaka

Ajaqa (also seen as Ajaga and Ajaqua) were an Australian R&B band comprising four sisters, Catherine, Erica, Mary and Tracy Ajaka. In December 2000 they were signed to Transistor Music. Their single, "Back 2 U" (September 2001), which is based on the Hindu philosophy of karma, reached No. 70 on the ARIA singles chart. In November of that year they were chosen by Australian Recording Industry Association (ARIA) to represent Australia at the Shanghai Asian Music Festival. Ajaka was a support act to Destiny's Child 2002 Australian tour.
