= Bella Tromba =

Trumpet quartet

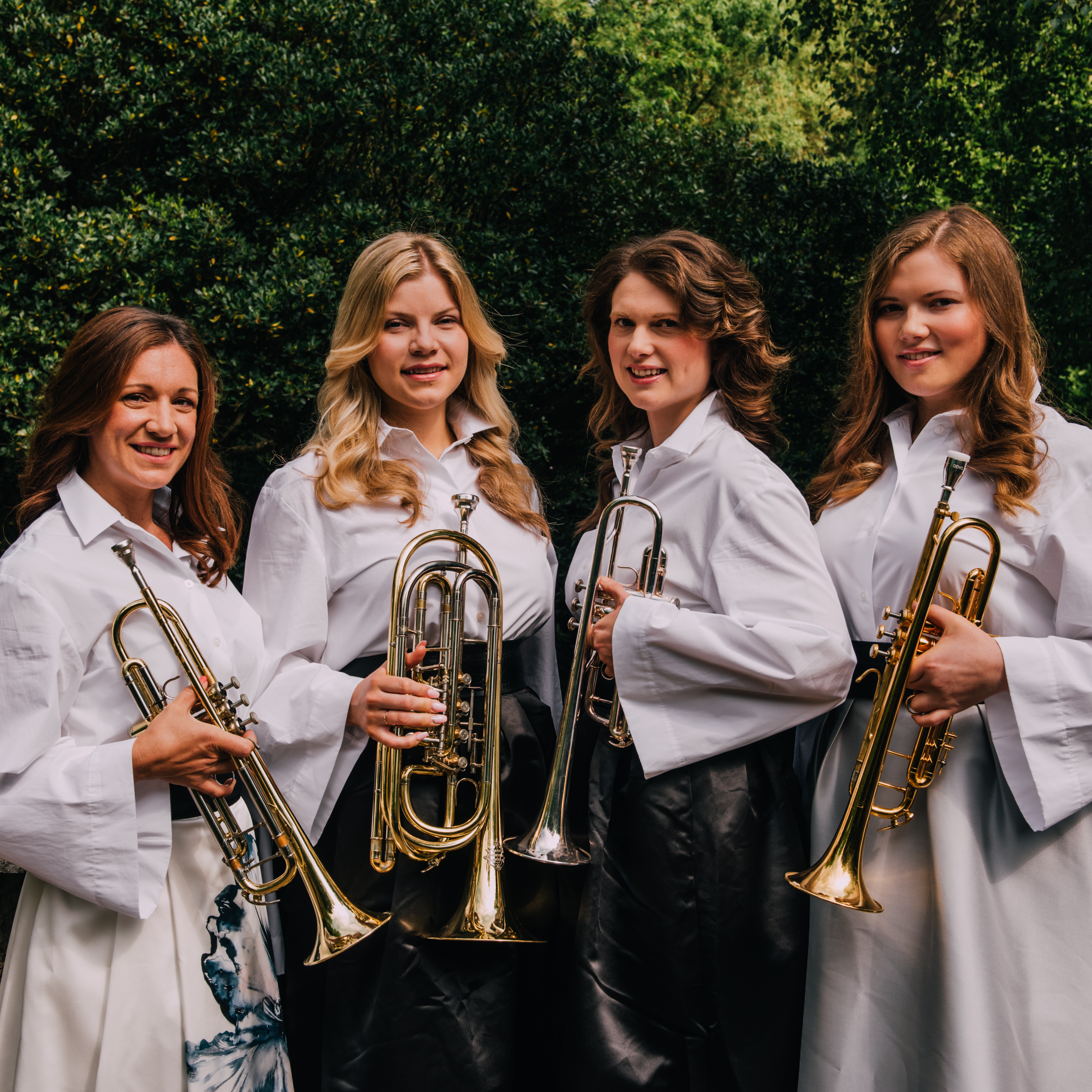

Bella Tromba are an all-female trumpet quartet founded in 2004. The four founding members all studied at the Royal Academy of Music in London. The original members were Jo Harris (Trumpet), Vickie Curran, Nicole Lyons and Clare Helsdon.

They regularly appear at the UK's leading music festivals including Cheltenham, Harrogate, and Henley and are particularly active in the commissioning of new works for brass and trumpet quartet.

The group perform on different types of trumpet including bass trumpet, flugel, piccolo, Bflat, C, Eflat and D trumpets.

They are past winners of the Park Lane Group Young Artists award and are Selected Artists for Making Music. They performed as Live Music Now artists from 2005-2010.

They regularly appear on BBC Radio 3's In Tune programme with Sean Rafferty, and in 2007 performed and recorded with American rapper and producer Kanye West.

In 2010 they performed at the International Women's Brass Conference in Toronto.

== Commissioned works and premieres ==
- Berceuse in a Box, 2007. By Paul Whitmarsh. Premiered Pump Rooms, Cheltenham Festival.
- Blockhead, 2007. By Maxim Bendall Premiered Pump Rooms, Cheltenham Festival.
- Alveston, 2007. By Howard Skempton. Premiered Purcell Room, London.
- The First Four Trumpets, 2007. By Paul Max Edlin. Premiered Purcell Room, London.
- Ancient Battlefields, 2007. By Giles Easterbrook. Premiered Purcell Room, London.
- Fanfare for the Uncommon Woman, 2007. By Joan Towers. Premiered UK, Windsor Castle.
- Booze, Ballads And Bloodshed, 2008. By Ross Brown. Premiered Harrogate International Festival.
- Gestures III, 2008. By Hugo Ribeiro. Premiered Deal Festival.
- There'll never be another you, 2008. By Gavin Broom. Premiered Bichester Jazz Festival.
- Jazz Songs for Trumpets and Vibraphone, 2008. By Gavin Broom. Premiered Harrogate International Festival.
- Colori di Roma, 2009. By Peter Longworth. Premiered Caledonian Club, London.
- Glassblowing, 2009. By Paul Burnell Premiered Recollect Glass Art Gallery, London.
- El Grito del Silencio, 2010. By Susanne Erding Swiridoff Premiered International Women's Brass Festival, Toronto.
- L'homme arme, 2010. By John Reeman. Dartington Music Festival.
- Blast, 2011. By Bruce Knockles. Premiered Church Stretton and South Shropshire Arts Festival.
- Trumpet Quartet no. 1, 2012. By Helena Gascoyne Premiered Milverton Concert Society.
- Days of Bells and Flying Creatures, 2017. By Peter Longworth. Premiered Caledonian Club, London.
- Reflections, 2017. By Becca Toft. Premiered Bledington Music Festival.
- Sea Serpents, 2017. By Peter Yarde Martin. Premiered Brockenhurst Music Society.
- Unconditional Love, 2022. By Howard Goodall. Premiered UK Milton Court.

== Awards ==
- Park Lane Group Young Artists

Live Music Now Fellows

Dorothy Parkinson Memorial Prize

Making Music Selected Artists

== Press ==
- The Guardian
- The Telegraph
- The Independent
- Metro
- Composition Today
- 4 Bars Rest
- Daily Echo
- Gazette
