= The Micragirls =

Finnish garage rock band

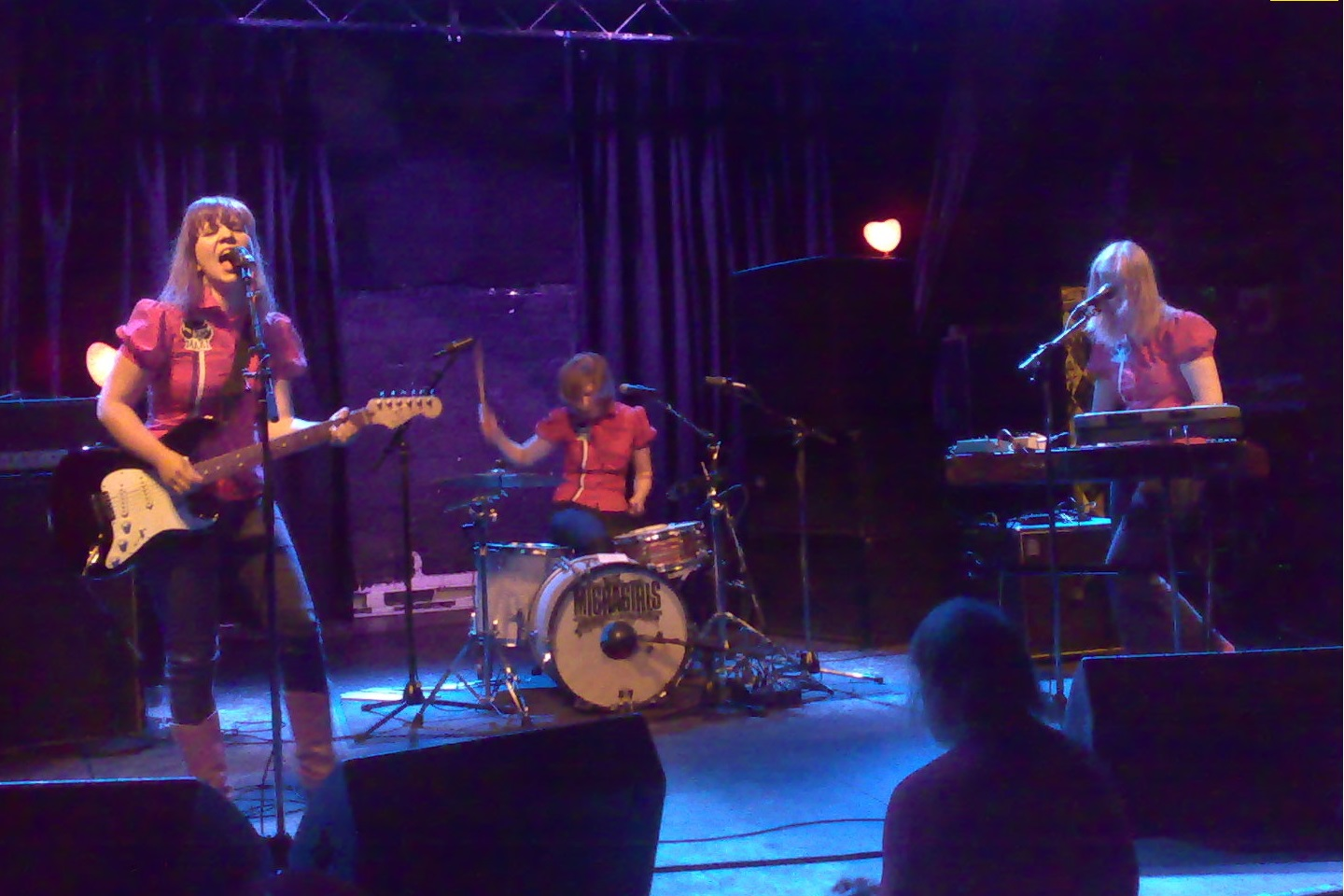
- The Micragirls in September 2008 performing at Tavastia Club in Helsinki

Background information
- Origin: Kuopio, Finland
- Genres: Garage rock
- Years active: 2001-2010
- Labels: Bone Voyage Recording Company
- Members: Mari Halonen; Katariina Haapalainen; Kristiina Haapalainen
- Past members: Elina Hakkarainen
- Website: myspace.com/micragirls

The Micragirls were a Finnish garage rock band. They were active from 2001 to 2010, gaining a cult following both in Finland and abroad. The band released two albums and several EPs and singles. The Micragirls did over 250 concerts, of which some 100 were outside Finland. The band's all-female principal line-up was a trio: drums, electric guitar and combo organ, with all band members singing.

== Story ==
=== Beginning, 2001–2002 ===
The Micragirls got started during Provinssirock outdoor rock festival in June 2001. Their friends' band Aavikko, while performing at the festival, had dedicated one of their songs to "Micratytöt". This was then translated to the English name of the newborn group.

Right after coming home from the festival the ladies walked into the rehearsal room of their friends and selected their instruments. Kristiina Haapalainen took on the drums as she had sat behind a drum kit a couple of times, her sister Katariina Haapalainen chose a career with keyboards, and petite Elina Hakkarainen picked up the bass guitar. Mari Halonen became the guitar player and lead vocalist, being the only one with any previous musical experience – on violin.

The first private gig of The Micragirls was already that August, and they had seven public performances during 2001. Their first concerts abroad were in Saint Petersburg, Russia, before the group had published any records. The band members had been enthusiastic music consumers and had even organized some gigs for other groups. This had provided them with good contacts within the Finnish music circles, and it was easy for The Micragirls to get gigs. With help from the band Aavikko they also got the chance to make their first record.

=== First seven-inchers, 2002–2006 ===
The Micragirls' first 7-inch EP Are You Insane, Girls? was published in August 2002. The EP consists of five songs, which were recorded during a weekend at the rehearsal room on single takes, with no overdubbing. The method provided a gig-like sound and atmosphere to the record.

The second EP Mind Twistin' Weekend with the Micragirls was recorded and mixed at the rehearsal room and home studio of a Finnish fellow band The Slideshaker. The four-song 7-inch was released in April 2003. Around that time bass player Hakkarainen decided to leave the group. The Micragirls had a lot of concerts scheduled and the remaining trio rearranged and rehearsed the songs to be performed without a bass guitar. A little later Katariina Haapalainen furnished the band with a Hohner Basset keyboard bass that she played in addition to a combo organ, her main instrument.

The Micragirls did around 30 concerts per year in 2002 and 2003. In addition to Finland they performed in Russia, Estonia and Sweden.

In the end of 2003, back in the rehearsal room, The Micragirls recorded new material for their third 7-inch, Primitive Homeorgan Blast. The four-song EP came out in the beginning of April 2004. Coinciding with the record release The Micragirls toured Sweden, Germany and Switzerland with The Slideshaker on their sixteen-show Surrender Tour. In 2004 The Micragirls had 35 gigs, of which 20 were abroad.

Next year was mostly spent on maternal leave. There were only seven concerts in 2005 but the group wrote new music even during their leave. The Micragirls were back at full speed in 2006: gigging and also working on the long-aspired 10-inch album.

=== Time of the albums, 2006– ===
The Micragirls recorded some new originals and cover songs in the beginning of 2006. Bone Voyage Recording Company, co-owned by members of the band 22-Pistepirkko, signed the group based on demo tapes from the sessions.

"Feeling Dizzy Honey!?", a ten-inch vinyl album was published in November 2006. The nowadays rare 10-inch format was at that time considered by the trio as maximum dose of "micramusic". In January 2007 the eight songs from the 10-inch album were reissued on a double CD version of "Feeling Dizzy Honey!?", packed together with disc 2 containing the eight earlier songs from the group's second and third EP. The CD release helped The Micragirls to reach a larger audience, and their annual gig rate rose to about fifty.

A Japanese domestic market one-disc CD edition of "Feeling Dizzy Honey!?" was published in end of 2007, containing the 16 songs and a bonus animated video of the song "Teenage Tiger". Yet another version of "Feeling Dizzy Honey!?" emerged in early 2008, this time a 12-inch colored vinyl LP record.

After extensive rereleasing of earlier recordings, three completely new Micragirls songs were published in June 2008 on the 7-inch EP Haunted Heart. Guest bassist Minna Kortepuro from the Finnish band Risto played her double bass on two of the songs. She also occasionally played onstage with The Micragirls.

The Micragirls toured in Europe on many occasions, most notably in Germany and Switzerland. During 2007–2009 they supported for example Heavy Trash, The Go! Team and Boss Hog on their European tours. The Micragirls did not perform in their home country between September 2008 and September 2009. The first domestic gigs of 2009 coincided with the release of a new album.

The group's second album Wild Girl Walk was released on 9 September 2009, somewhat later than originally planned. Members of 22-Pistepirkko acted as producers and recording engineers as well as technical consultants in the album sessions during 2008 and 2009.

The Micragirls have not performed in public since the 2010 Ilosaarirock outdoor festival.

== Style ==
The characteristic sound of The Micragirls is based on primitive beat, howling organ, and fervent vocal performances. Along their career the band developed from sheer fun-having towards more soulful musical expression.

There was a strong contrast between the looks and the sound of The Micragirls, especially during their fast-paced songs and notably when every band member was screaming simultaneously. The group usually wore 1960s style uniforms on stage. The Micragirls are often compared to the Japanese band The 5.6.7.8's.

== Personnel ==
- Mari Halonen - lead vocals, electric guitar
- Katariina "Kata" Haapalainen - keyboards, backing vocals
- Kristiina "Risu" Haapalainen - drums, backing and lead vocals

== Discography ==
Albums

- "Feeling Dizzy Honey!?", 10-inch mini LP, 2006
- "Feeling Dizzy Honey!?", 2×CD, 2007
- "Feeling Dizzy Honey!?", CD Japan, 2007
- "Feeling Dizzy Honey!?", 12-inch LP, 2008
- Wild Girl Walk, CD and LP, 2009

EPs and singles

- Are You Insane, Girls?, 7-inch EP, 2002
- Mind Twistin' Weekend with The Micragirls, 7-inch EP, 2003
- Primitive Homeorgan Blast, 7-inch EP, 2004
- Haunted Heart, 7-inch EP, 2008
- "Summer's Gone" / "Girl Go Crazy", downloadable single, 2009
- "C'mon Dance With Santa Claus", downloadable single, 2009
