= Red Poppy =

Chinese percussion group

Red Poppy is an all female percussion group from China. They are the first all-female percussion band from China. The percussion ensemble includes twenty full-time performers. Red Poppy uses over forty different types of Chinese and Western percussion instruments. They have performed in over 50 countries and were involved in the Beijing Olympic opening and closing ceremonies.

== History ==
Red Poppy was founded in 1999. Manager Zhou Li says that the name "Red Poppy" was chosen because it was considered both "beautiful and powerful." Red Poppy started with one member and has expanded after the success of the first performance in Europe. One of their first original songs dating back to 1999, is called "Chinese Dragon" and includes both Western and Chinese influences. They came to national attention in China when they performed in 2001 on China Central Television (CCTV) for the Spring Festival Party.

In 2005, Red Poppy performed during the five-day Chinese New Year festival held in Dublin's Chinatown.

In 2008, Red Poppy performed for the Beijing Olympics in the opening and closing ceremonies. They also recorded ahead of time in Sydney for Channel 7. In June 2008, the group performed in Amman.

In January 2013, Red Poppy performed on Broadway, showcasing their original take on the story of Hua Mulan in "Mulan the Musical." The version of the Mulan story presented by Red Poppy involves pantomime, dance and percussion. Due to popular demand, Red Poppy returned to Broadway again in 2014. Red Poppy toured Scotland and performed in London in 2015.

== Critical reception ==
Tim Page, writing in The Washington Post, called a 2005 performance "diluted" by "insipid synth-pop." Page, however, did praise the skill of the musicians themselves, saying that they "rattled, roared, pounced and parried in high style."

A 2013 performance at New York's Peter Jay Sharp Theater was well-reviewed, with The New York Times reviewer only complaining about some of the visuals incorporated into the performance.
