= Finally Punk =

American punk band

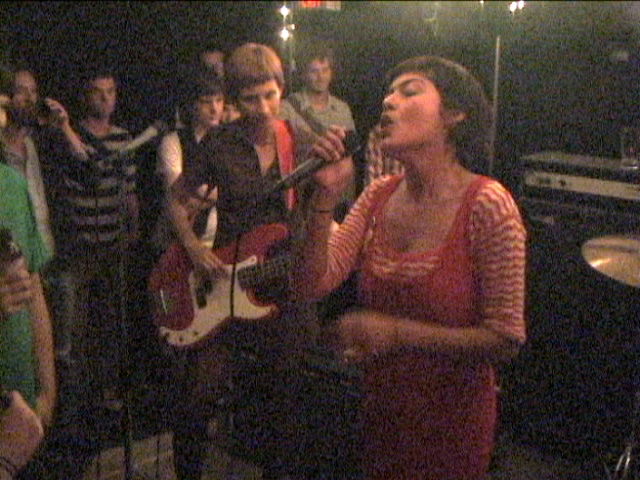
- @ Cake Shop NYC – July 2005

Background information
- Origin: Austin, Texas, United States
- Genres: Punk rock
- Years active: 2005–2009
- Labels: Army of Bad Luck, Wonk, Germs of Youth, M'lady's

Finally Punk were an all-female punk quartet based in Austin, Texas formed in 2005. Its members are Erin Budd, Stephanie Chan, Veronica Ortuño, and Elizabeth Skadden.

Their demo CD-R titled, Get Serious, was released the same year which included various lo-fi one-minute long punk tracks recorded in true D.I.Y. tradition—on a 4-track in a concrete practice space. Notably, their Nirvana cover for Negative Creep and aesthetic of rotating instrument and vocal duties, quickly gained attention by Pitchfork Media and Karen O (Yeah Yeah Yeahs), among others. Following their demo release, they assembled 12 songs onto their debut Self-Titled 7" LP released in June 2006, and was distributed by Rough Trade and Kill Rock Stars, due to constant support of Tobi Vail (Bikini Kill) who stated:

This is the band Bikini Kill was trying to inspire with all that riot grrl stuff. Four girls from Austin, TX playing their own style of punk that sound like equal parts Mika Miko, Lung Leg and Meltdown. Hilarious, true and liberating. This is just as fresh-sounding as those Kleenex 7"s you are hunting for, and it's happening today!

In the zummer of 2006, they embarked on an extensive two-month U.S. national tour with queercore punk band Kiosk from Australia.

In the summer of 2007, Finally Punk released their Primary Colors EP on the Atlanta-based label Army of Bad Luck run by Josh Fauver (Deerhunter). In support of their EP, they did a second national U.S. tour with all-female punk band, New Bloods of Portland, Oregon.

In 2008, Finally Punk wrote and recorded over a period of 4 days in Austin, TX the Hypertension 7" EP which was released by M'Lady's Records that same year. They toured the West Coast, where an infamously disastrous New Year's Eve party show was recorded in Oakland, CA that became the basis for the Construct/Destruct CD EP released by London-based label Germs of Youth run by James Hoare (Ultimate Painting).

Finally Punk toured Europe in the summer of 2009, in support of their Casual Goths 12" co-released by Army of Bad Luck and Germs of Youth. Finally Punk played their last show as a band on July 4, 2009, at The Old Blue Last in London, England.

Over the course of four years as a band, they gained many positive reviews. They were featured on the cover of Maximum Rocknroll issued November 2008 which includes an interview given by Gene Defcon (The Prima Donnas) and introductory by Layla Gibbon of Skinned Teen. They also played SXSW Music Festival in Austin, TX in 2006, 2007, and 2009.

Finally Punk have also toured alongside bands such as Sex Vid and the Strange Boys.

== Discography ==
- Get Serious Demo CD-R (self-released, 2005)
- Finally Punk s/t CD (self-released, 2006)
- Finally Punk s/t 7" LP (Wonk Records, 2006)
- Primary Colors/KVRX Live Cassette Tape (self-released, 2007)
- Primary Colors 7" EP (ABL Records, 2007)
- Hypertension 7" EP (M'Lady's Records, 2008)
- Construct/Destruct CD EP (Germs Of Youth Records, 2009)
- Casual Goths 12", which compiles their three 7"s to date LP (Germs Of Youth/ABL Records, 2009)

Compilations:

- Tracks '"Perks of Old People" and "Manatee" appear on the Methodist Leisure Inc. free compilation Short Attention Span, also featuring related band, Dumb Haircuts. (2009, "Methodist Leisure Inc.")

Videos:

- Live 1/Live 2 on New Video Works DVD Compilation (Post Present Medium, 2008)
