= Danielle Durack =

American alternative rock band

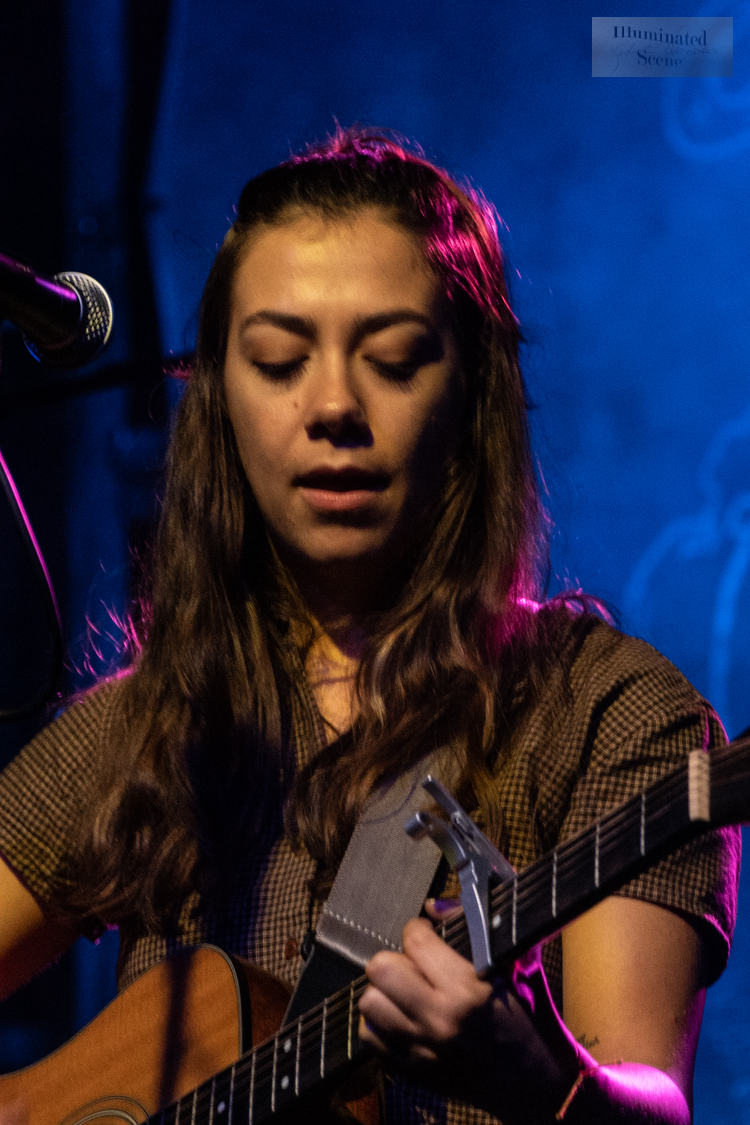

Background information
- Origin: Phoenix, Arizona, U.S.
- Genres: Indie rock; Indie pop
- Years active: 2015-present
- Members: Danielle Durack
- Website: http://www.danielledurack.com

Danielle Durack (born August 23, 1995) is an American singer/songwriter and multi-instrumentalist from Phoenix, Arizona.

== Biography ==
Durack's debut album, Bonnie Rose, was released in 2017. Her sophomore effort, 2019's Bashful, saw her career begin to take off when lead single "Sunshine" landed on Spotify's "New Music Friday" playlist.

The 2020 quarantine saw Durack begin recording new music at Reciprocal Recording (re-opened as Hall Of Justice in 2011) in Seattle, WA. Later that year, she released two singles with music videos – "Eggshells" and "Broken Wings."

On January 15, 2021, Durack independently released her third studio album, No Place. Pitchfork awarded the album a 6.7. That same year, she was featured on Sydney Sprague's single "object permanence" (Rude Records).

In 2022, Durack made her debut official appearance at SXSW.

== Discography ==
=== Albums ===
- Bonnie Rose (2017)
- Bashful (2019)
- No Place (2021)
- Escape Artist (2024)
