= Hang on the Box =

Chinese punk band

- Origin: Beijing, China
- Genres: Punk rock; post punk
- Years active: 1998–present
- Labels: Benten Label; Arrivederci Baby; Scream
- Members: Wang Yue; Yilina Li; Shenjing; Xiaogan
- Past members: Li Yan Fan

Hang on the Box (known also as HOTB) (Chinese: 挂在盒子上; pinyin: Guàzài hézǐ shàng) is a punk band based in Beijing. They were China's first all-female punk band. The band usually sings about sex and relationship issues in a forward political manner. The original band consisted of the following line-up: Wang Yue, known as Gia Wang, on vocals, Yilina playing bass, Li Yan Fan playing guitar, and Shenjing on drums.

Their music could be described as cheerful and hilarious, deadly serious, and personally political. Most of the questionable content involved comes in the form of native Chinese speakers using English commonplace epithets.

Gia Wang has said that in the early days it was hard for the band to play in China and they were not welcomed by the Chinese market so without signing to a Japanese label she would have been unable to continue her music career.

== History ==
Hang on the Box formed in July 1998 after Yilina and Wang Yue, high school classmates, met Li Yan Fan at the music store where they worked. After a discussion, they decided to form a band together. The trio decided to call themselves Hang on the Box, after a band that Yilina had dreamed about being in. The following year, after graduation, Wang Yue met Shenjing and invited her to join the band. Shenjing took over on drums while Li Yan Fan switched over to guitar.

At Hang on the Box's first performance at Beijing's Scream Club in 1998, their songs did not have lyrics and only high-pitched screeching accompanied their power chords. They were featured on the cover the local edition of Newsweek six months later.

HOTB was included on the compilation album Beijing Screams, released in August 2000 by Japanese record label Satsugai Enka Vinyl. Audrey Kimura of indie label Benten later heard the compilation and was so intrigued by the band's music that she travelled to Beijing that November to see them perform live. Impressed by what she saw and heard, Kimura signed Hang on the Box to Benten and the following year the band released their debut album, Yellow Banana. Looking back on the record, Jim Butler wrote: "The album offers glimpses of alienation and frustration that can sear the soul if they catch you right." Later in 2001, they played their first shows in Japan as part of the Wild Wacky Party Asia tour, alongside Lolita No. 18, Mummy the Peepshow and Non Stop Body. In 2002, Yilina left the band and was replaced by Liu Bao of New Pants. However, she rejoined HOTB the following year.

In March 2003, Hang on the Box went on an American tour, which included performing at SXSW. Following the tour, Li Yan Fan left HOTB and was replaced by Xiaogan, who was a friend of Shenjing. With his addition to the group, HOTB ceased to be exclusively female. Regarding this change, Yilina explained in 2004: "We have gone beyond being a girl band. We want to keep the inspiration of being female musicians, but at the same time be recognized as just an awesome group." May 2003 saw the release of the band's second album, Di Di Di, on Japanese label Bad News, who had arranged for the US tour. CD Journal called it "a truly compelling work" and noted influences of Sleater Kinney and bands on the Kill Rock Stars label. A few months later, in October, the band released their first record with European distribution. For Every Punk Bitch and Arsehole, a compilation of previously-released songs plus one live recording, was released by Cherry Red imprint Arrivederci Baby. The record was well-received by Karen O, who voiced her praise on HOTB's online bulletin board.

== Members ==
- Gia (王悦) – vocals (1998-)
- Axu (徐京晨) – guitar
- North (北北) – bass
- Desi-Fan (德思凡) – drums

=== Former members ===
- Yang Fan (扬帆) – original guitarist (1998–2003)
- Yilian (隐退) – original bassist (1998-)
- Shen Jing (沈静) – original drummer (1998-)
- tookoo – guitar
- Ubi (邓力源) – guitar (2010–2013)
- Niu Fang Fang (牛方方) – bass (2010–2015)
- Yang Yang (杨扬) – drummer (2010–2015)

== Discography ==
- Yellow Banana (2001)
- Di Di Di (2003)
- For Every Punk Bitch and Arsehole (2003)
- Foxy Lady (2004)
- No More Nice Girls (2007)
- Kiss Kiss, Bang Bang (2013)
- Oracles (2017)

== See also ==
- Chinese rock
- Cobra
- Sister Benten Online
