= Benten Label =

Japanese independent record label

- Founded: 1994; 32 years ago
- Founder: Audrey Kimura
- Distributors: Nippon Crown; Fuji Pacific Music; Australian Cattle God
- Genre: Punk rock; pop-punk; doo-wop; alternative rock
- Country of origin: Japan
- Location: Tokyo
- Official website: https://bentenlabel.com/

Benten Label is an independent record label based in Japan. Founded by Audrey Kimura (who would go on to co-found Japan Nite) in 1994, it focuses on female bands of various genres and music that is "fun, energetic, and exciting".

== History ==
While working for a bank in Tokyo, Audrey (Shisaka) Kimura was helping Hiroshi Asada with his job at the Tom's Cabin music promotion office. At Asada's suggestion, Kimura formed her own record label in April 1994 with the goal of specializing in female artists. She named it Benten Label after the only female deity of the Seven Lucky Gods, and goddess of the arts, Benten, whom she called an inspiration. Kimura later opined that "female bands are more free" and are "less uptight about musical categories."

Benten Label started with licensing works by American band Lunachicks as well as The Flamenco A Go Go. Regarding the marketing utilized by the label, No Depression wrote: "The outrageously funny and downright raunchy nature of some of Benten's promotional material sinks any image of meek Asian women." In 1997, Kimura formed a sister label to Benten, with distribution from Nippon Crown and Fuji Pacific Music, called Sister Records.

In 2005, the label started releasing records in America, with distribution handled by Austin-based label Australian Cattle God, under the name Benten Tokyo. TsuShiMaMiRe's Pregnant Fantasy was the first album to be released through this arrangement, with Red Bacteria Vacuum's Roller Coaster, Amppez's The Irony of a Fruit and Petty Booka's Dancing with Petty Booka following afterwards.

== Roster ==
- Petty Booka
- Hang On The Box
- Titan Go King's
- Nonstop Body
- Last Target
- Brain Failure
- Lolita No. 18
- Mummy the Peepshow
- Soap Land Momiyama
- Candy Eyeslugger
- Bu*Li
- O*N*T*J
- TsuShiMaMiRe
- Red Bacteria Vacuum

The label sponsors the Wild Wacky Party punk rock concert series.

== See also ==
- List of record labels
