= TsuShiMaMiRe discography =

The discography of Japanese punk rock band TsuShiMaMiRe, including officially released demos, single, albums, and compilations. While TsuShiMaMiRe has often adopted English translations for international promotion, the titles printed on the original CD release are used with romanized English.

== Discography ==
=== Albums ===
Year	Album details	Track listing	Oricon
2004	Souzou Ninshin: Released: August 25, 2004; Label: Benten	1. Ume umai tanedekai 2. Lingerie Shop; 3. Ebihara Shinji; 4. Manhole; 5. Ocha Ska; 6. Kedama; 7. Camaboco; 8. Souzou Ninshin	
2007	Brain Shortcake: Released: July 7, 2007; Label: July Records	1. Aircon no Remocon; 2. Baka moto curry 3. Nomiso Shortcake; 4. Ii tempo desu.; 5. Cutie Beauty Kewpie; 6. Mama no uta 7. Punk san	
2008	TsuShiMaMiRe to Rock to Beer de: Released: May 21, 2008; Label: July Records	1. Mi kara deta sabi 2. Sakuran Boy; 3. Ojiichan no ozubon 4. Smoothie nomu hitsuji 5. Chandan danshi 6. America no Burger; 7. Atarashii sekai no yoake wa toriaezu rock to beer de	
2009	Ah Umi Da: Released: May 12, 2010; Label: Flying Dog/Victor	1. Ganpeki no ue no ichi-pon yubi souchou 2. Time Lag; 3. Breath You; 4. Kennaku Shopping; 5. Yamaguchi; 6. Stop & Go!; 7. Matsuri; 8. Mic Smell Kun Kun; 9. Isogin chaku hito moncha ku 10. Kaisanbutsu	
2010	Sex on the Beach: Released: May 12, 2010; Label: Flying Dog/Victor	1. Sex on the Beach; 2. Chicken Sandwich; 3. Strobo; 4. J-Pop; 5. Momo Darou; 6. Pan Basket; 7. Bicycle; 8. Himejijo; 9. Grandmother's bra 10. Nezumi Sensation; 11. Rappa renshū-chū 12. Rush hour 13. My life is outside	97
2011	Giving Blood: Released: February 23, 2011; Label: Mojor Records	1. Utsubyou; 2. Sonata de Alarm; 3. French Toast Rendezvous; 4. Doing Nothing; 5. Grapefruit Girl; 6. Ram Sheep; 7. Bryan; 8. Soratakaku; 9. Na mellow 10. Neko wa hontou wa yasashii ikimono janai 11. Kenketsu Song	
2012	Shocking: Released: February 2, 2012; Label: Mojor Records	1. Kuufuku to kuuhaku 2. Darwin; 3. Theme of Sara; 4. Cabbage world no kaiko-roku 5. Hokka Hoka Day; 6. Fly, Ebi Fried; 7. Shocking; 8. Road of Girl; 9. 24 hours Carnival; 10. Kyuuseishu -Messiah-; 11. UFO for You; 12. Uchuu to Ookina ai	
2012	Giving "More" Blood: Released: May 1, 2012; Label: Good Charamel Records; (U.S. Release with English titles)	1. Depression (US Remix); 2. Sonata de Alarm (US Remix); 3. French Toast Rendezvous; 4. Doing Nothing; 5. Grapefruit Girl; 6. Ram Sheep; 7. Bryan; 8. Na mellow 9. Soratakaku; 10. Cat Is Not Really Affable Creature; 11. Giving Blood Song; 12. Kitchen Drunker (Bonus Track); 13. Depression (Demo); 14. Giving Blood (Demo); 15. Mohawk (Bonus Track)	
2013	TsuShiMamire: Released: May 15, 2013; Label: Mojor Records	1. Ai no yume 2. Jaguar; 3. Sai akuma 4. In your syrup 5. Iinari Ginger Ale; 6. Hajimari no uta 7. Uso sou sou 8. Nounai Touhikou; 9. Rosehip Hibiscus; 10. Karamawari; 11. SNS; 12. No Punk	
2015	Abandon Human: Released: October 7, 2015; Label: Mojor Records	1. Ningen Coating; 2. Fa**Fa*Fa; 3. People; 4. Fantastic Adventure Land; 5. Hang Out Da!; 6. Jaa nani?; 7. Abu ku tatta 8. Kinou, kono sora no shita de 9. Shinmidori; 10. Kono shunkan ni kako ni naru	
2015	Kongetsu no Uta 2015: Released: December 24, 2015; Label: Mojor Records	1. Nanakusa; 2. Funky mame maki 3. Momo no sekku 4. Hanami soto de sake 5. Tango no setsuku 6. Tsuyu to you 7. Ase mo kai kai 8. Katorisenkou; 9. Taifuu da 10. New October; 11. November Lovers; 12. Jingle	
2017	New: Released: October 25, 2017; Label: Mojor Records	1. Uchuu Elevator; 2. Tokyo Jellyfish; 3. Crazy for you 4. Don't you?; 5. Hello World; 6. Girl's Talk; 7. Parmigiano Reggiano; 8. Kekkon kedaruge neko no kedarake 9. Simple; 10. Hitotsu; 11. Punk-san 2	
2017	TsuShiMaGeRu: Released: October 25, 2017; Label: Mojor Records	1. Shigeru; 2. Gegege no Gerushii; 3. Kawaii Shigeru; 4. TsuShiMaGeRu; 5. Shigeru - TsuShiMaGeru no Fudeoroshi "Shigeru" Live Ver.; 6. Uso Sou Sou - TsuShiMaGeRu ni Yoru TsuShiMaMire Cover Live Ver.; 7. Nomiso Shortcake - Shigeru ga Sukidayo TsuShiMaMire Cover Live Ver.	
2018	Live at Moulin Rouge: Released: July 6, 2018; Label: Mojor Records	1. Nomiso Shortcake; 2. Time Lag; 3. Jaguar; 4. Abukutatta; 5. Uchuu Elevator; 6. Girl's Talk; 7. Ai no Yume; 8. Hajimari no Uta; 9. Ningen Coating; 10. Fa**FaFa; 11. Speedy Wonder	
2021	SAKEMAMIRE: Released: November 17, 2021; Label: Mojor Records	1. Beer; 2. SHOT YOU; 3. Give me Whiskey; 4. SAKE; 5. Vodka War; 6. Ole! Tequila; 7. I am a Wine; 8. Kanpai MAMIRE; 9. Nippon Zenkoku Sakenomi Ondo	
2022	Live in Germany: Released: November 2, 2022; Label: Mojor Records	1. Shot You; 2. Jaguar; 3. Sex on the Beach; 4. わたしワイン = I Am A Wine; 5. 愛の夢 = Dream Of Love; 6. はじまりのうた = Beginning; 7. ニンゲン・コーティング = Human Coating; 8. ビール = Beer; 9. 日本酒 = Sake; 10. タイムラグ = Time Lag	
2024	バンドは水物 (Bando wa Mizumono): Released: March 13, 2024; Label: Mojor Records	1. Show You My Soy Sauce; 2. 24030番地に回覧板を回せ; 3. 低気圧のせい = Pressure Drop; 4. Double Punch Kick; 5. Look Back in Anger; 6. サイケデリック自問自答 = Psychedelic Soliloquy; 7. Color; 8. バカ元カレー = Baka Moto Karee; 9. ヨリ戻シチュー = Yori Modo Shichuu; 10. 迷曲 = Meikyoku; 11. バンドは水物 = Mizumono	

=== Singles and EPs ===
Year	Single details	Track listing	Oricon
2000	Hamburger Set: Released: 2000; Label: B.C. Mojor Records	1. America no Burger; 2. Utsubyou; 3. Ocha Ska	
2002	Ryuuketsu Mohikan: Released: 2002; Label: B.C. Mojor Records	1. Mohikan; 2. Manhole; 3. Kenketsu Song	
2005	Love & Peace & Bou: Released: 2005; Label: B.C. Mojor Records	1. Ii tempo desu.; 2. Chandan Danshi; 3. Na mellow 4. Mama no Uta; 5. Sekai heiwa to bou	
2006	Brain A-La-Mode: Released: 2006 Label: B.C. Mojor Records	1. Aircon to Remocon; 2. Nomiso Shortcake; 3. Jinsei Kengai	
2008	Six Mix Girls: Released: December 10, 2008; Label: BounDEE	1. Hyper Sweet Power Japanese Ver.; 2. Teki no Theme - Sorrows of Enemy; 3. Oyasumi no Uta - Sleepy Dreamy Marshmallow; 4. Hyper Sweet Power; 5. Teki no Theme - Sorrows of Enemy (Instrumental Ver.); 6. The Powerpuff Girls (End Theme)	
2009	Time Lag: Released: April 22, 2009; Label: Flying Dog/Victor	1. Time Lag; 2. Go aisatsu to kyoku kaisetsu 3. Time Lag (vocal only); 4. Time lag (instrumental only)	64
2010	Strobo: Released: April 14, 2010; Label: Flying Dog/Victor	1. Strobo; 2. Kakegae no nai hibi 3. Strobo (Mari no kuchi yasume ver.)	48
2010	Kenketsu Song/Kitchen Drunker: Released: December 9, 2010; Label: Mojor Records	1. Kenketsu Song; 2. Kitchen Drunker	
2013	Jaguar: Released: March 13, 2013; Label: Mojor Records	1. Jaguar; 2. Yoi machi kusa 3. Owari dake ga aru 4. Nomiso shortcake - Studio Live Version 2013	
2014	Ningen Coating: Released: October 15, 2014; Label: Mojor Records	1. Ningen Coating; 2. People; 3. Ii 15-shuunen desu	
2018	Night and Morning: Released: August 22, 2018; Label: Mojor Records	1. Anarchy Morning; 2. Night Rider; 3. Mimidoshima; 4. Karipaku; 5. Post; Gaitare Mamire (Bonus CD); 1. Tip Tip (TsuShiMaMiRe cover version); 2. Tomato (TsuShiMaMiRe cover version); 3. I Don't Give a Damn (TsuShiMaMiRe cover version); 4. Tip Tip (Kids N Cats); 5. Tomato (We Are The Asteroid); 6. I Don't Give a Damn (Ego Function Error); 7. Japan ft. TsuShiMaMiRe (Kids N Cats); 8. Future Gods (We Are The Asteroid); 9. Lazy Cat - Japanese Version (Ego Function Error)	
2020	LUCKY: Released: November 11, 2020; Label: Mojor Records	1. LUCKY; 2. Love Love Love La; 3. NORI; 4. Song for an End to the Epidemic; 5. THE PAYDAY -We Really Need Cash Version-	
2024	Break the Curse: Released: December 1, 2024; Label: Epic Games	1. Break the Curse	

=== Compilations ===
Year	Compilation details	Track listing	Oricon
2014	MaMiRe: Released: February 12, 2014; Label: Mojor Records	1. Speedy Wonder; 2. Jaguar; 3. Sex on the Beach; 4. UFO for You; 5. Air Control Remote Control (2014 new recording); 6. Ojichan no ozubon 7. Mi kara deta sabi 8. Darwin; 9. Nomiso shortcake 10. Hyper Sweet Power; 11. Ebihara Shinji; 12. Ochassu ka 13. Strobo; 14. Time Lag; 15. J-Pop; 16. Kuufuku to kuuhaku 17. Matsuri; 18. Baka Moto Curry; 19. Grapefruit Girl; 20. Ai no Yume; (Limited Edition CD); 1. Speedy Wonder -Slowly Wonder version-: 2. Atarashii sekai no yoake wa toriaezu rokku to bia de -15th beer haime version-; 3. Ii tempo desu. -Ka ga suggoi ii!- version 4. Ume umai tanedekai -Kanjuku Ume version-; 5. Mama no Uta -Saisho no Mama version-; 6. Manhole -Bushitsu REC version-; 7. Wakai neko wa hontou wa yasashii ikimono janai -2000 Chiba Taisai live-; 8. Ocha Ska -2001 Chiba Daigaku "Sakuru no Hi" live-	
2017	Beginning: Released: May 13, 2017; Label: Mojor Records	1. Speedy Wonder; 2. Fa**FaFa; 3. Darwin; 4. Slowly Wonder; 5. Sai Akuma; 6. Ai no Yume; 7. Kinou, kono sora no shita de 8. Ningen Coating; 9. Hajimari no uta 10. Hanami Soto de sake	
