= Red Bacteria Vacuum =

Japanese punk band from Osaka

- Origin: Osaka, Japan
- Genres: Hardcore punk
- Years active: 1998–2013
- Labels: Love2Skulls; Pink Chip; Benten Tokyo; GuzGuz
- Spinoffs: The Jungles!!!
- Past members: Ikumi; Kassan; Akeming; Katsu; Jasmine; 325

Red Bacteria Vacuum (レッドバクテリアバキューム) was an all-girl punk band from Osaka. Formed in 1998, RBV went through several lineup changes before ceasing activities in 2013. Former members of the band went on to form a new punk rock group, currently known as The Jungles!!!

== History ==
Red Bacteria Vacuum was originally formed by Akeming in 1998. By 2000, the group consisted of herself on drums, Ikum! (formerly known as Ikumi) on guitar and Kassan (formerly known as RanRan) on bass. Their first recording, an eight track CD-R demo entitled Such a Scream, was released that same year. The band then relocated to Tokyo in 2002.

In May 2004, Red Bacteria Vacuum contributed a cover of "Platypus (I Hate You)" to the Green Day tribute album Green Days II. That July, they released their first record, Killer Dust. In March 2005, RBV performed at the ROCKRGRL Music Conference in Seattle. The band then released the Roller Coaster EP in September 2005 on Love2Skulls. The record was then rereleased in January 2006 on Pink Chip Records due to limited availability. Roller Coaster also received distribution in America on Benten Tokyo via the Australian Cattle God label in 2006.

Later in 2006, Akeming left the band, leaving Red Bacteria Vacuum without a drummer. She was replaced the following year by Katsu who herself departed the group in early 2009. By April 2009, Jasmine became the drummer.

As part of their 2009 American tour, they played at the J-pop Summit in San Francisco. That same year marked the release of the documentary Live House, which featured RBV, in addition to other bands. In October 2009 Red Bacteria Vacuum released their first full album, Dolly Dolly, Make a Epoch, on their own label, GuzGuz Records. 2009 also saw the band tour alongside The Applicators. RBV toured in the US once again in March 2010, appearing at SXSW as well as participating in the Japan Nite event. In March 2011, the group played at the Big Day Out festival in Australia. The following month, it was announced that Red Bacteria Vacuum would open for A Perfect Circle on all their non-festival 2011 tour appearances.

In January 2013, the band became a quartet with the addition of guitarist 325. That same year, Red Bacteria Vacuum released their second full-length album, Hey! Peeps. In June of that year, the band entered a hiatus following the departure of Kassan. A few months later, in September, the three remaining members went on to form a new band, Jungles.

== Discography ==
=== Albums ===
- 2000: Such a Scream
- 2004: Killer Dust
- 2009: Dolly Dolly, Make a Epoch
- 2013: Hey! Peeps

=== EPs ===
- 2005: Roller Coaster

=== DVDs ===
- 2006: Panic Junky Special Live
