= TSMMR =

TSMMR is an acronym that may stand for:

- Tsu Shi Ma Mi Re, an all-female band from Japan
- Tri-State Mini-Moto Racing; see Pocketbike racing
