= Noumiso Shortcake =

脳みそショートケーキ

Studio album by Tsu Shi Ma Mi Re
- Released: July 7, 2007 (Japan)
- Genre: Art punk
- Length: 25:09
- Label: Benten Label Tokyo

Tsu Shi Ma Mi Re chronology
創造妊娠 (2004)	脳みそショートケーキ (2007)

脳みそショートケーキ (Noumiso Shortcake) is the second album by the Japanese art punk band つしまみれ (Tsu Shi Ma Mi Re).

== Track listing ==
1. "エアコンのリモコン" EAKON no RIMOKON / Air Conditioner Remote
2. "バカ元カレー" BAKA moto KAREE / Stupid Ex-Boyfriend
3. "脳みそショートケーキ" Noumiso SHOOTO KEEKI / Brain Shortcake
4. "良いテンポです。" Yoi TENPO desu. / It's a Good Tempo.
5. "キューティービューティーキューピー" KYUUTII BYUUTII KYUUPII / Cutie Beauty Kewpie
6. "ママのうた" MAMA no uta / Mama's song
7. "パンクさん" PANKU san / Mr. Punk
8. enhanced CD『エアコンのリモコン』

English titles are approximate translations.
