= Youth Killed It =

UK musical group

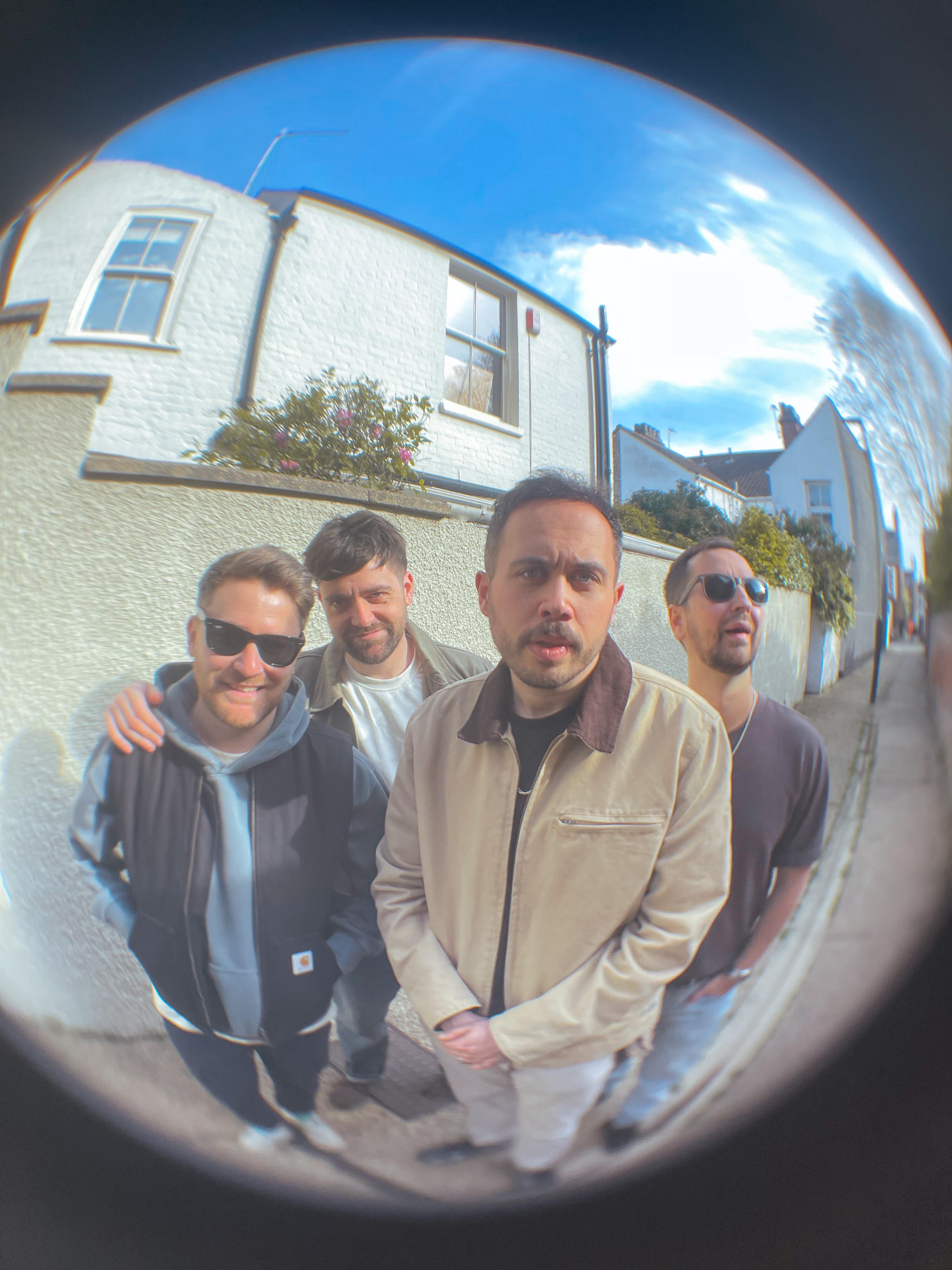
- Youth Killed It during a photoshoot in Norwich, 2025

Background information
- Origin: Norwich, England
- Genres: Indie rock
- Years active: 2016–present
- Label: Rude Records
- Members: Jack Murphy; Danny de Ara Torres; Paul Gaul; Joel Mullin
- Past members: Carlos Montero; Ben Ford; Joshua Arter-Taylor; Josh Thexton
- Website: www.youthkilledit.com

Youth Killed It is a British rock band formed in early 2016. The band is currently composed of Jack Murphy, Paul Gaul, Danny de Ara Torres and Joel Mullin. Youth Killed It have released two studio albums, multiple EPs and singles, and have maintained an active presence on the UK touring and festival circuit.

The band initially emerged following a change in direction from an earlier project, with an original lineup featuring Jack Murphy, Josh Thexton, Josh Arter-Taylor, Ben Ford and Carlos Montero. In late 2016, Youth Killed It signed to Rude Records after releasing two counterpart EPs, ‘‘Welcome To The Sad Boys Club’’ and ‘‘Welcome To The Happy Girls Club’’."Rude Records - Artist Page". Ruderecorz.com."Ten Eighty Magazine - Youth Killed It EP Release". Teneightymagazine.com. These releases were later compiled into the band’s debut album, ‘‘Modern Bollotics’’ (2017), which included the single “Popstar”, followed by the standalone single “Islands”.

Their second full-length album, ‘‘What’s So Great, Britain?’’, was released in 2018. Between 2019 and 2022 the band underwent several lineup changes, ultimately transitioning away from Rude Records to operate independently. During this period they released the singles “Dad Dance Moves”, “Muzzle Head” and “I Don’t Care”, before issuing the EP ‘‘I’m a Believer, I Just Don’t Believe Ya’’ in 2022, which the band cited as the beginning of a new creative era.

Youth Killed It have toured extensively and shared stages with acts including Slaves (UK), Wonk Unit and The Sherlocks, and have toured with The LaFontaines, MassMattiks and Goldie Lookin’ Chain. They have appeared at festivals including Camden Rocks, Isle of Wight Festival, Y Not Festival and Teddy Rocks. In 2023, the band played a sold-out hometown show at Norwich Waterfront Studio, followed by a series of UK support slots and new releases in 2024, including “Up All Night”.

In 2025, Youth Killed It began releasing material from their forthcoming album ‘‘Are You Having A Good Time’’, including the singles “Johny Bravado”, “NPC” and “Lovely Day for It”. That year they also appeared at 2000trees Festival on the Axiom Stage and supported The Reytons at their headline show at OVO Arena Wembley. In 2026, the band played their largest hometown show to date at The Waterfront, performing to an audience of over 400, and announced plans to embark on a UK tour, including a date at the O2 Islington Academy in London.

== Discography ==
Title	Album details	Type
Modern Bollotics	Release Date: 12 May 2017; Label: Rude Records	Album
Whats So Great, Britain?	Release Date: 05 October 2018; Label: Rude Records	Album

== Members ==
=== Current members ===
- Jack Murphy - Vocals/Guitar/Production (2016–Present)
- Danny de Ara Torres - Guitar (2019–Present)
- Joel Mullin - Drums (2019–Present)
- Paul Gaul - Guitar (2021–Present)

=== Past members ===
- Carlos Montero - Guitar (2016-2019)
- Ben Ford - Drums (2016-2019)
- Joshua Arter-Taylor - Guitar (2016-2020)
- Josh Thexton - Bass/Vocals (2016–2022)
