= Ah Umi Da =

'A, Umi Da'

Studio album by Tsu Shi Ma Mi Re
- Released: June 17, 2009 (Japan)
- Genre: Art punk
- Length: 38minutes

あっ、海だ。 / A, Umi Da (Oh, the Sea) is the fourth full-length album of the Japanese indie rock band Tsu Shi Ma Mi Re. It was released on June 17, 2009.

== Track listing ==
1. "岩壁の上の一本指総長 (One Finger Boss on the Rock Wall" - 1:54
2. "タイムラグ (Time Lag)" - 3:07
3. "ブレスユー (Bless You)" - 4:24
4. "険悪ショッピング (Ominous Shopping Trip)" - 6:10
5. "山口 (Yamaguchi)" - 3:53
6. "まつり (Matsuri)" - 2:17
7. "マイクスメルくんくん (Mic Smell Kunkun)" - 4:14
8. "ストップ&ゴー! (Stop&Go!)" - 3:59
9. "いそぎんちゃくひともんちゃく (Isoginchaku Hitomonchaku)" - 5:23
10. "海産物 (Kaichanbbutsu)" - 4:00
