= Rude Records =

Independent record label

- Industry: Music
- Genre: Pop punk, hardcore punk, alternative rock
- Founded: 2000; 26 years ago
- Founder: Ilich Rausa; Gianluca Amendolara
- Headquarters: Milan, Italy
- Area served: Worldwide
- Key people: Ilich Rausa, President; Federico Croci, General Manager; Filippo Falconi, Project Manager; Martina Decina, Financials; Gaia Ponzoni, Communications Manager; Paola Picaro, Promotions; Stephanie Van Spronsen, Label Manager; Davide Storelli, Graphic Design
- Services: Record label, music publishing
- Number of employees: 7
- Website: ruderecords.com

Rude Records is an independent and international record label founded in 2000 and based in Milan, Italy. The label's artists are generally considered to fall under the genres of punk rock, pop punk, post-hardcore, and alternative rock. Over the years the company has signed agreements with various record labels, especially from the US, to handle promotion, marketing, and distribution of their releases in Europe. It has published over 150 albums by more than 60 artists.

== Name ==
The name Rude Records takes inspiration from "rude boys", ska fans: when was the time to decide the label's name Gianluca Amendolara was producing an album by Franziska, a band that followed that genre.

== History ==
Rude was founded in 2000 by Ilich Rausa and Gianluca Amendolara, in order to publish two bands of friends (Kevlar HC and No Comply).

The success came in 2001, when a song by Sun Eats Hours was included in a Rock Sound compilation and they were contacted to support the Offspring on tour.

In 2005, a collaboration with Nitro Records (label owned by the singer Dexter Holland) was established and, in the following year, a new deal was signed with Side One Dummy Records to promote their catalog in Southern Europe. Agreements with Punk Core, Bad Taste Records and Hopeless Records followed. In 2007, Rude Records licensed the back catalogue of Gogol Bordello from Rubric Records for the world outside the US. The following year they released a documentary movie of Gogol Bordello, in Europe, titled The Pied Piper of Hutzovina. In 2011, Zebrahead joined the Rude roster, with their album "Get Nice!", and were followed by Bedouin Soundclash, Less Than Jake and The Mighty Mighty Bosstones by the end of the year. In 2013, the label expanded its network into South East Asia, Japan, Australia, and New Zealand.

Over the years it has developed an international network with teams in North America, the UK, Asia, Japan, Australia and Europe which further increases the label's global presence. Rude Records in recent years has signed many young artists that it has launched internationally such as Stand Atlantic, Blood Youth, Homebound, Sundressed and many others. From 2020 Rude Records signed a worldwide agreement with Sony Music for digital and physical distribution operated by The Orchard and a deal with Sony ATV America for the management of publishing.

In March 2022 Rude Records gained the B Corp certification.

== Artists ==
- All Get Out
- American Hi-Fi
- As Cities Burn
- A Will Away
- Bars of Gold
- Blood Youth
- Calling All Captains
- Catch Fire
- The Dangerous Summer
- Decade
- Gideon
- Graphic Nature
- Guttermouth
- Hail the Sun
- Happy.
- The Juliana Theory
- William Ryan Key
- Light Years
- Mobs
- Modern Error
- Never Loved
- Nova Charisma
- Polyphia
- Puppy
- Saves the Day
- Sydney Sprague
- Sundressed
- Sunsleeper
- Superlove
- Sydney Sprague
- Telltale
- The End of the Ocean
- Vagrants
- Waxflower
- Weatherstate
- Young Culture

=== Former ===
- 7 Minutes In Heaven
- Adam Carpet
- Airway
- Andead
- Andrea Rock
- Armor for Sleep
- Banda Bassotti
- Bedouin Soundclash
- Blessed By A Broken Heart
- Blondelle
- Boy Jumps Ship
- Brent Walsh
- Capsize
- Crooked Teeth
- Danko Jones
- Destine
- Elvis Jackson
- Emery
- Franziska
- Gasnervino
- Gogol Bordello
- Homebound
- I Am The Avalanche
- I the Mighty
- Junior
- Kevlar HC
- Knuckle Puck
- Less Than Jake
- Like Torches
- Man Overboard
- Nemesi
- No Comply
- Patent Pending
- Rentokill
- Set It Off
- Sleep On It
- Stand Atlantic
- Steam
- Summerlin
- Sun Eats Hours
- The Dear Hunter
- The Hives
- The Maine
- The Mighty Mighty Bosstones
- The Weekend Classic
- This Century
- Useless ID
- Woes
- Youth Killed It
- Zebrahead

== Representation ==
=== Labels represented ===
- Bad Taste Records (2008-2012)
- Hassle Records (from 2009)
- Hopeless Records (from 2006)
- Nitro Records (2005-2013)
- Punkcore Records
- Rubric Records (from 2007)
- SideOneDummy (from 2006)
- Wynona Records (from 2009)

=== Bands represented ===
- A Wilhelm Scream
- AFI (active with Republic Records)
- Against All Authority
- Air Dubai
- All Time Low
- Amber Pacific (active with Victory Records)
- Anarbor
- Anti-Flag (active with Spinefarm Records)
- The Aquabats
- Attack! Attack! (disbanded)
- Avenged Sevenfold (active with Mercury Records)
- August Burns Red (active with Fearless Records)
- Bayside
- Big D and the Kids Table
- The Briggs
- Broadway Calls
- Brothers of Brazil
- Cancer Bats
- The Casualties
- Chuck Ragan
- Crime in Stereo
- The Damned
- The Dangerous Summer (disbanded)
- Dillinger Four (active with Fat Wreck Chords)
- Divided By Friday
- Driver Friendly
- Ensign
- Fact
- Flogging Molly
- The Gaslight Anthem (active with Mercury Records)
- The Get Up Kids
- Goldfinger
- The Horrible Crowes
- The Offspring (active with Columbia Records)
- Reverend Peyton's Big Damn Band
- Rufio
- Samiam
- Senses Fail (active with Pure Noise Records)
- Silverstein (active with Rise Records)
- Son of Sam
- T.S.O.L.
- Taking Back Sunday
- Title Fight
- There For Tomorrow
- Thrice (active with Vagrant Records
- The Sounds
- The Queers (active with Asian Man Records)
- The Used
- The Vandals
- Turbowolf
- We Are the In Crowd
- We Are the Ocean
- The Wonder Years
- Yellowcard
- 65daysofstatic
- 7 Seconds
- 88 Fingers Louie (disbanded)

== Compilation ==
- 2001 – Stay Rude, Stay Rebel
- 2002 – Mad for Ska
- 2003 – Punk It!
- 2003 – Anti-Tour - The Combat Compilation
- 2004 – Punk It! Vol.2
- 2007 – Think Punk Vol. 1
- 2014 – PGA - Italian Punks Go Acoustic: Stay Together For The Kids
- 2016 – Music for Boobies
- 2016 – PGA - Italian Punks Go Acoustic: If the Kids Are United
- 2020 – It'd Be Rude Not To

== See also ==
- List of record labels
