= Japan Nite =

Annual music event in North America

- Japan Nite 2008 promotional poster featuring the tour's signature female mascot
- Genre: Rock music, Punk rock, Pop music, Jazz, Electronic music
- Years active: 1996–present
- Website: Japan Nite on Facebook

Japan Nite is an annual music event in North America which began in 1996, featuring Japanese rock, pop, and alternative music artists. Originally centered on South by Southwest in Austin, Texas, the event expanded in later years to include multi-city tours of the United States, and has often been the first US performance for the participating artists.

== History ==
Japan Nite was conceived by Hiroshi Asada, former manager of Pizzicato Five, and Audrey Kimura, the founder of the independent Japanese label Benten.

Asada organized a showcase called Psycho Night (a play on the Japanese word saiko, for "awesome") at the 1992 New Music Seminar in New York City featuring only Japanese acts, including Pizzicato Five. Asada was approached by representatives from SXSW who invited him to create a similar showcase in Austin, since there was not a strong presence of Asian music at the festival at the time.

Kimura brought her band Lolita No.18 to perform at the first Japan Nite in 1996, the first Japanese band to ever play SXSW.

In 2008, the all-girl rock band Scandal toured the U.S. as part of the Japan Nite tour, the band's first tour outside of Japan.

In 2011, Japan Nite's performances at SXSW benefitted the Japanese Red Cross's recovery efforts for the Great East Japan Earthquake. In 2013, Japan Nite's tour extended to Canada for the first time with a performance at Canadian Music Week.

In 2016, X Japan leader Yoshiki made a surprise guest appearance at Japan Nite's SXSW performance in Austin on the same night as the festival's premiere of the documentary film We Are X.

In 2020, the Japan Nite tour was cancelled due to COVID-19 restrictions.

== Reception ==
Japan Nite's reputation among music journalists has been anchored in its eclectic showcase of unusual artists. The Austin Chronicle said "Japan Nite usually means getting your mind blown" and LA Weekly characterized the tour as "bringing an eclectic mix of alternative-minded Japanese bands".

== Participating artists ==
"It used to be that most of the artists at Japan Nite were major label bands," Asada said. "The music business people thought that one show at SXSW would be enough to make a deal out of, but it isn’t so easy." Lack of participation from major labels became a major factor in the tour's programming, and Japan Nite's lineup shifted away from the mainstream in later years, featuring primarily alternative music acts. "I go for the weird bands,” Asada said. "If we could deal with major labels, we could set that up, but they just focus on the Japanese market now."

=== Lineup ===
Year	Artist	Cities
1996	Lolita No.18, Pugs	Austin (SXSW)
1997	Husking Bee, Cocco, Pugs, The Mad Capsule Markets	Austin (SXSW)
1998	Tengoku Jack, The Kokkeshies, ONTJ, Balbora, Cocco	Austin (SXSW)
1999	eX-Girl, Missile Girl Scoot, Nicotine, Number Girl	Austin (SXSW)
2000	Mummy the Peepshow, Dr. Strangelove, Number Girl, Spoozys, Lolita No.18, Original Love	Austin (SXSW)
2001	Love Psychedelico, Bleach03, Heart Bazaar, Playgues, The Jerry Lee Phantom, Dr. Strangelove	Austin (SXSW)
2002	Bonkin'Clapper, The Soulsberry, Understatements, Foe, Nananine, Fantasy's Core, Petty Booka, The Jerry Lee Phantom, The Salinger, Bleach03	Austin (SXSW)
2003	Condor44, Core Of Soul, Invisibleman's Deathbed, Minor League, Papaya Paranoia, Petty Booka	Austin (SXSW)
2004	Kishidan, Fuzzy Control, Zanzo, The Emeralds, Response, Romz Records Crew, TsuShiMaMiRe, Kokeshi Doll, Noodles, Petty Booka, Bleach03	Austin (SXSW)
2005	Titan Go King's, I-Dep, The Emeralds, Noodles, The Pillows, The Hot Shots, Suns Owl, Zanzo, Petty Booka, Bonnie Pink	Austin (SXSW), Chicago, New York, Canton, Boston, Los Angeles, Seattle, Berkeley, San Francisco
2006	Vasallo Crab 75, The Rodeo Carburettor, PE'Z, Ellegarden, TsuShiMaMiRe, The Emeralds	Austin (SXSW), San Antonio, New York, Cambridge, Philadelphia, Chicago, Denver, Seattle, Portland, San Francisco, Los Angeles
2007	HY, The Emeralds, The 50 Kaitenz, Go!Go!7188, Pistol Valve, Oreskaband	Austin (SXSW), New York, Boston, Chicago, Philadelphia, Seattle, San Francisco, Los Angeles
2008	Detroit7, Avengers in Sci-Fi, Ketchup Mania, Petty Booka, Quartz-head 02, Sodopp, Scandal	Austin (SXSW), New York, Boston, Chicago, Denver, Seattle, San Francisco, Los Angeles
2009	FLiP, Dirty Old Men, Honey Sac, Sparta Locals, Grapevine, Detroit7, Stereopony, SpecialThanks, The Emeralds, SA, Asakusa Jinta, Quaff	Austin (SXSW), New York, Boston, Chicago, Denver, Seattle, San Francisco, Los Angeles
2010	Chatmonchy, Okamoto's, Red Bacteria Vacuum, Dolly, Omodaka, JinnyOops!, Riddim Saunter	Austin (SXSW), New York, Boston, Chicago, Seattle, San Francisco, Los Angeles
2011	Mo'some Tonebender, Lolita No.18, Hystoic Vein, Zukunashi, White White Sisters, Oh Sunshine	Austin (SXSW), New York, Chicago, Seattle, Las Vegas, San Francisco, Los Angeles
2012	Saito Johnny, Nokies!, Kao=S, ZZZ's, Vampillia, The Rubies, Akabane Vulgars on Strong Bypass	Austin (SXSW), Chicago, Las Vegas, Los Angeles, New York, San Francisco
2013	Kao=S, Charan-Po-Rantan, Jake Stone Garage, Chihiro Yamazaki+Route 14 Band, Pirates Canoe, Four Minutes Til Midnight, Josy	Austin (SXSW), Chicago, Columbus, Las Vegas, Los Angeles, New York, San Francisco, Toronto
2014	Happy, Mothercoat, Mayu Wakisaka, Jungles (R.B.V.), Starmarie, Sentimental City Romance	Austin (SXSW), Athens (GA), Chicago, Columbus, Las Vegas, Los Angeles, New York, San Diego, San Francisco
2015	moumoon, TsuShiMaMiRe, Pirates Canoe, The Fin., Quorum, Samurai Dynamites, Mahoshojoninaritai	Austin (SXSW), Athens (GA), Chicago, Columbus, New York, Denver, Los Angeles, San Diego, San Francisco
2016	Ed Woo, Pannacotta, The Fin., Tempalay, Rei, Jungles (R.B.V.), Reatmo, Alexandros	Austin (SXSW), New York, Baltimore, Chicago, Long Beach, San Francisco
2017	Chai, Srv.Vinci, Walkings, Anglogix, HanatoChiruran, RiRi	Austin (SXSW), New York, Chicago, Seattle, Portland, San Diego, San Francisco, Los Angeles
2018	Domico, Attractions, Mika Kanda, Rude-α, Prankroom, Anna Takeuchi	Austin (SXSW), New York, Chicago, Las Vegas, Los Angeles, San Diego, San Francisco
2019	Furutori, Asterism, Stereogirl, Regallily, The Perfect Me, Ex-Girl	Austin (SXSW)
2020* (cancelled)	Uchikubi-Gokumondokokai, Kyusonekokami, Tri4th, The Tomboys	*all venues cancelled due to COVID-19
2021* (cancelled)	(no musical acts announced)	(no venues announced)
