= Migi Mo Hidari Mo Shihai Suru Atama Wa Kyou Mo Niku O Kui Yodare =

Studio album by Bleach
- Released: 2006
- Genre: Thrashcore, D-beat, hardcore punk, noise rock
- Label: High Wave

Bleach chronology
Bleach (2003)	Migi Mo Hidari Mo Shihai Suru Atama Wa Kyou Mo Niku O Kui Yodare (2006)	Kien (2008)

Migi Mo Hidari Mo Shihai Suru Atama Wa Kyou Mo Niku O Kui Yodare, which translates to The Head That Controls Both Right And Left Sides Eats Meats And Slobbers Even Today, is a 2006 album by Japanese noise rock group Bleach. It showcases the band showing a more polished sound, with notable improvements on the guitar. It also features a bonus live DVD featuring performances at Club Fujiyama.

The title track was featured as the opening song for an episode of Mr. Robot.

== Track listing ==
No.	Title	Length
1.	"Samurai Jungle"	2:35
2.	"Migi Mo Hidari Mo Shihai Suru Atama Wa Kyou Mo Niku O Kui Yodare O Tarasu (The Head That Controls Both Right And Left Sides Eats Meats And Slobbers Even Today)"	3:07
3.	"Headcleaner"	1:44
4.	"Torch"	2:56
5.	"Peacock No Housoku (Law Of The Peacock)"	3:32
6.	"Get You Human"	2:33
7.	"Not Peter"	2:17
8.	"Kono Koro Fantasy (Recent Fantasy)"	1:27
9.	"Myakudou (Pulsation)"	4:34
10.	"Rock Ni Yobarete Iru (Rock Is Calling Me)"	2:44
11.	"Sketchbook"	3:36
12.	"Naname (Askew)"	4:26
13.	"Skull Saiban (Skull Trial)"	2:18
14.	"Ayashi No Yume (Fascinating Dream)"	3:05

== DVD tracks ==
No.	Title	Length
1.	"Get You Ningen (Get You Person)"
2.	"Torch"
3.	"Migi Mo Hidari Mo Shihai Suru Atama Wa Kyou Mo Niku O Kui Yodare O Tarasu (The Head That Controls Both Right And Left Sides Eats Meats And Slobbers Even Today)"
