= Puppy (band) =

English rock band

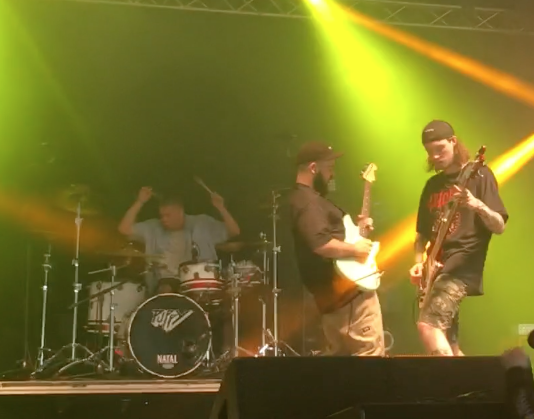
- Puppy at Download Festival 2018. From left to right; Billy Howard Price, Jock Norton, Will Michael

Background information
- Origin: London, England
- Genres: Alternative metal, occult rock
- Years active: 2014–present
- Labels: Rude; Spinefarm
- Members: Jock Norton; Will Michael; Billy Howard Price
- Past members: Matthew Rickelton

Puppy are an English rock band from London, formed in 2014. The band's lineup consists of vocalist/guitarist Jock Norton, bass guitarist Will Michael and drummer Billy Howard Price. They are currently signed to Rude Records.

== History ==
=== 2014–2015: Formation and early years ===
Following the demise of the band Polterghost, Norton and Price formed Puppy in late 2014 with bass player Matthew Rickelton. In 2015, Puppy debuted their first single "Forever", subsequently followed by "The Great Beyond". Both songs appeared as playable tracks on Guitar Hero Live. Following a string of dates throughout the year supporting the likes of Demob Happy, Pity Sex and Kagoule as well as a performance at the Reeperbahn Festival in Hamburg, Germany in September, Puppy released their self-titled debut EP in 2015.

=== 2016–2017: Vol II ===
Will Michael replaced Matthew Rickelton on bass duties shortly after the release of their debut EP. On 10 April 2016, Daniel P. Carter played Puppy's single "Entombed" on the BBC Radio 1 Rock Show for the first time. In May 2016, Puppy announced, via their Facebook page, that they would be releasing a new EP later that year, which would include "Entombed". After an appearance at that year's Download Festival, they released their second EP, entitled Vol II, on 12 August 2016. In October 2016, the band toured with Sorority Noise across the UK.

The band signed to Spinefarm Records in March 2017 and embarked on a short European tour supporting Creeper and Milk Teeth. In April that year, Puppy were nominated for "Best New Band" at The 2017 Metal Hammer Golden Gods Awards. Dates supporting CKY in May and Kvelertak in October preceded a small headline tour throughout the UK in late 2017. The band re-released Vol II on 29 September 2017 via Spinefarm Records.

=== 2017–2020: The Goat and iii ===
A new single, entitled "Demons" was released in October 2017, accompanied by a music video. From March to April 2018, Puppy toured with Bristol based alt-rockers Turbowolf throughout Europe. On 1 June 2018, via their Facebook page, Puppy announced a "World Tour" with UK hardcore band Grove Street Families, which consisted of nine dates across the UK in September 2018. Puppy performed a set at Download Festival again in June 2018 and spent the rest of 2018 working on their full length debut album with Royal Blood, Ghost and Pixies producer Tom Dalgety, and Creeper and Boston Manor producer Neil Kennedy. On 17 August 2018, the band announced that they would be the opening act for American nu metal band King 810's headline tour of the UK in December 2018. However, Puppy ultimately pulled out of the tour on 5 December, due to an "ongoing health issue" that "made travel and performance too difficult".

On Sunday 26 August 2018, Daniel P Carter played Puppy's new single, "Black Hole" on Radio One. Carter and Puppy also announced that Puppy's debut album, entitled The Goat, would be released on 25 January 2019 through Spinefarm Records. The following day, a music video for "Black Hole" was premiered on Revolver Magazine's website. On 13 November 2018, Puppy released the 2nd single from The Goat, entitled "World Stands Still". On 15 December 2018, Marc Burrows featured Puppy in The Guardian's "One to Watch" column, describing the band as having "a knack for hitting hard – as on recent single Black Hole – in a way that is headbangingly (sic) authentic and, whisper it, commercially appealing.", adding "Puppy are that rare thing: a homegrown metal band capable of capturing the mainstream".

During a European tour supporting Monster Magnet in January 2019, Puppy's debut album, The Goat, was released. Metal Hammer gave the album 4 stars out of 5, stating; "For a debut album this is a mightily impressive and quirky little record". NME stated that The Goat "contains more hooks than a pirate convention". Bristol in Stereo said that the album is "a refreshing take on metal with a tongue-in-cheek attitude". Loudwire named it one of the 50 best rock albums of 2019.

Puppy performed at 2019's Reading and Leeds Festivals, and were nominated in the "Best UK Breakthrough Band" category at the 2019 Heavy Music Awards. In September 2019, Puppy announced a co-headline tour throughout Europe and the UK with Norwegian Stoner Rock band Bokassa. The tour lasted from late November until mid December 2019.

On 25 October, after weeks of cryptic messages posted on the band's social media channels, Puppy dropped their 3rd extended play, entitled iii. The EP was recorded over the summer of 2019 at Holy Mountain Studios in London. This recording featured a more stripped down production than on The Goat, as the band "recorded quickly and essentially live to capture chemistry, spirit (and) a more frayed and brutal set of sonics." They also announced a release show for the EP, which took place in Hackney on 31 October, where they played iii in its entirety.

On 18 November, it was confirmed that Puppy were due to return to play at Download Festival in 2020. However, due to the COVID-19 pandemic, the festival was cancelled. Puppy released a music video, via their official YouTube channel, for the song "Powder Blue" on 17 April. On 21 July, the band released a music video for 'fan favourite' track, "Serotonin", containing various visual stimuli, which, according to drummer Billy Price, intentionally displays "so many textual and visual interpretations of the song that it becomes almost uninterpretable", adding "We have never been more easily interconnected, and yet communication has never felt this hard. In a sense, this is what the song 'Serotonin' is about".

=== 2021–2022: Rude Records and Pure Evil ===
On 3 June 2021, Puppy, via their Facebook page, announced that they had signed to Rude Records. From 7 to 9 June, the band played three socially distanced shows at Walthamstow's Signature Brewery, debuting new material. On 5 July, Puppy released their first single for Rude Records, "Angel", with an accompanying music video. On 15 November, the 2nd single from their upcoming album was released, entitled "The Kiss", following a world exclusive first play on the Radio 1 Rock Show. According to Jock, this song "came out of songwriting sessions for our first album".

Puppy's third single, "...And Watched It Glow", received a world exclusive premiere during the Radio 1 Rock Show broadcast on 30 January, along with the announcement of their sophomore album, Pure Evil. Regarding the album's title, Norton remarked: "I think we all liked how dumb it sounded, but then the dichotomy of the two words really resonated as well. Broadly speaking I think we've always tried to combine classic pop songwriting with a love of heavier music, and on this album I think we take that a step further with some of our loudest moments combined with some of our sweetest. It feels like a nice way to say something about the band and our ethos while ultimately still being able to call it something stupid."

The fourth single from Pure Evil, entitled "Shame", premiered on 28 February. Revolver Magazine said of the song; "While many of Puppy's previous songs sat squarely in the middle of a Venn diagram between Smashing Pumpkins and Helmet, "Shame" doesn't have an explosive payoff or gigantic guitar crunch. Instead, it's a bass-driven tune with gloomy, disaffected vocals and a loping groove that's buttressed by haunting "ah-ah" harmonies" adding that the song was "more atmospheric than hard-hitting".

The album's 5th single "My Offer" was released on 7 April. The band said of the track; "a pretty rare instance of us pushing the tempo up a bit. In true Puppy fashion however, we had to throw the nastiest, sludgiest riff on the record in there halfway through just to stop things getting too stale. It's one of the new tracks we're most excited about playing live for sure."

Pure Evil received critical acclaim upon release, with rock music publications Kerrang! and Metal Hammer awarding the album 4 out of 5 stars. Kerrang! noted that Puppy "seem incapable of filler" and said that the album "deserves to be heard by as many people as possible, as it's sure to appeal to a very broad base of fans. If you were to think in terms of a Venn diagram encapsulating stoner metal, nineties alternative and garage rock, Pure Evil exists in that irresistible overlap." Metal Hammer said that Pure Evil is "what every sophomore album should strive to achieve. The Goat showcased that the three-piece could undoubtedly write massively catchy tunes by the barrel-load, but this record utilises their songwriting abilities to the next level, adding a gravitas that sucks you in from the off.", adding that it was "Puppy's most sophisticated release to date, and an absolute must-listen." Distorted Sound Magazine also highly praised the album, calling Pure Evil "a triumph of a second album that should put them high up on a pedestal for all to see", adding that "Each track has a way of bursting into life, has a chorus that worms its way into your eardrums, and finishes with you hungry for more." and awarding the album 9/10 stars.

From May to June 2022, the band embarked on a UK tour to promote the album, with support from Oversize, Zetra and Inhuman Nature. This was followed by festival appearances at 2000 Trees and ArcTanGent in July and August, respectively.

=== 2024–Present ===
After a two year hiatus, during which time Billy Howard Price worked on various art projects and directed music videos for Creeper, Green Lung and Zetra and Jock Norton worked as a lighting technician for music venues, the band announced a comeback gig at Blondies Brewery in London for the 28th September 2024. In 2025, Puppy announced a new UK tour and festival appearance at 2000 Trees.

== Musical style ==
Critics have categorised Puppy's music as alternative metal and occult rock. Puppy's music has been described by Spinefarm Records as combining "the left-field melodic turns of Weezer, the hazy fuzz of Smashing Pumpkins and the straight-to-the bone sonics of the Big Four of Thrash". The band themselves have stated that their goal, musically, "was to aim for somewhere between Teenage Fanclub and Black Sabbath". Additionally, Metal Hammer has compared the band's musical style to "Ghost waltzing with Deftones", "Mixing flashy, glam rock guitar flourishes that turn into huge hulking metal riffs with the kind of chin-stroking, elegant indie pop that Weezer have made a career from". Revolver Magazine characterised their debut album, The Goat, as "a frothy, fist-raising cocktail blending various chunks of Black Sabbath, AC/DC, Metallica, Soundgarden, Nirvana, Meat Puppets and Dinosaur Jr., topped with infectious choruses and infused with heavenly harmonies." Critics have additionally described Puppy as having dabbled in shoegaze, lo-fi and noise rock on Pure Evil.

== Discography ==
Studio albums

| Title | Album details |
|---|---|
| The Goat | Released: 25 January 2019; Label: Spinefarm; Format: CD, DL, LP |
| Pure Evil | Released: 6 May 2022; Label: Rude; Format: CD, DL, LP |

Extended plays

| Title | Album details |
|---|---|
| Puppy | Released: 25 September 2015; Label: Best Fit Recordings; Format: DL, EP |
| Vol II | Released: 12 August 2016; Re-Released: 29 September 2017; Label: Spinefarm; Format: DL, EP, CD (Re-Release) |
| iii | Released: 25 October 2019; Label: Spinefarm; Format: DL, EP, Cassette |

=== Official music videos ===
- Arabella (2016)
- Beast (2017)
- Entombed (2017)
- Demons (2017)
- Black Hole (2018)
- World Stands Still (2018)
- Bathe in Blood (2019)
- Poor Me (2019)
- Powder Blue (2020)
- Serotonin (2020)
- Angel (2021)
- The Kiss (2021)
- ...And Watched It Glow (2022)
- Shame (2022)
- My Offer (2022)
- Glacial (2022)
