= SpecialThanks =

Japanese band

- Origin: Aichi Prefecture, Japan
- Genres: Pop punk, punk rock
- Years active: 2005-present
- Labels: KOGA/Groovy Drunker Records
- Members: Misaki (Vocal & Guitar); Yoshida (Drums)
- Past members: Sean; Nochi; Lupin; Heisuke; Hiromu; Junpei; Toshiki; Kousuke
- Website: http://www.specialthanks777.com/39s.html

SpecialThanks is a punk rock band from Aichi Prefecture, Japan. They are currently signed by KOGA/Groovy Drunker Records. The band is made up of Misaki (vocal & guitar), Yoshida (drums)

== Songwriting ==
Until 2015, SpecialThanks published songs entirely in English. Misaki stated in an interview, "Since I was a kid, all of my favorite Japanese bands (Donut Man, Stompin' Bird) were singing in English, so I thought 'Being in a band = singing in English.' I thought that was normal." On their second album Missa, released in July 2015, the song "Love begets love" is in Japanese.

== Notable Achievements ==
SpecialThanks single "You Say Good Bye" was featured the iTunes Japan Single of the Week. It garnered 60,000 downloads in its first seven days of release. The song's music video was a "Power Push" on Japan's Space Shower TV.

In August 2008, their mini-album debuted at number one on Japan's indie-music.com charts. In March 2009, the band performed at the South by Southwest music festival in the United States as part of the Japan Nite event.

In November and December 2014, they released split album with Japanese band Mix Market and major debut single for the anime Wolf Girl and Black Prince opening theme.

== Discography ==
Studio albums

- Seven Colors (August 6, 2008)
- Seven Showers (August 5, 2009)
- Seven Lovers (January 26, 2011)
- Missa (July 8, 2015)
- heavenly (May 11, 2016)
- Anthem (May 10, 2017)
- Sunctuary (April 22, 2020)
- PUNK RECORDS (October 23, 2024)

EPs/Singles

- Campanula EP (December 5, 2012)
- Move On (December 4, 2013)
- Love Good Time (December 3, 2014)
- HEART LIGHT (February 21, 2018)

Split album

- Rock 'n' Roll (November 5, 2014)

Live album

- Seven Lives Plus 1 (September 22, 2010)
