= Pistol Valve =

Japanese band

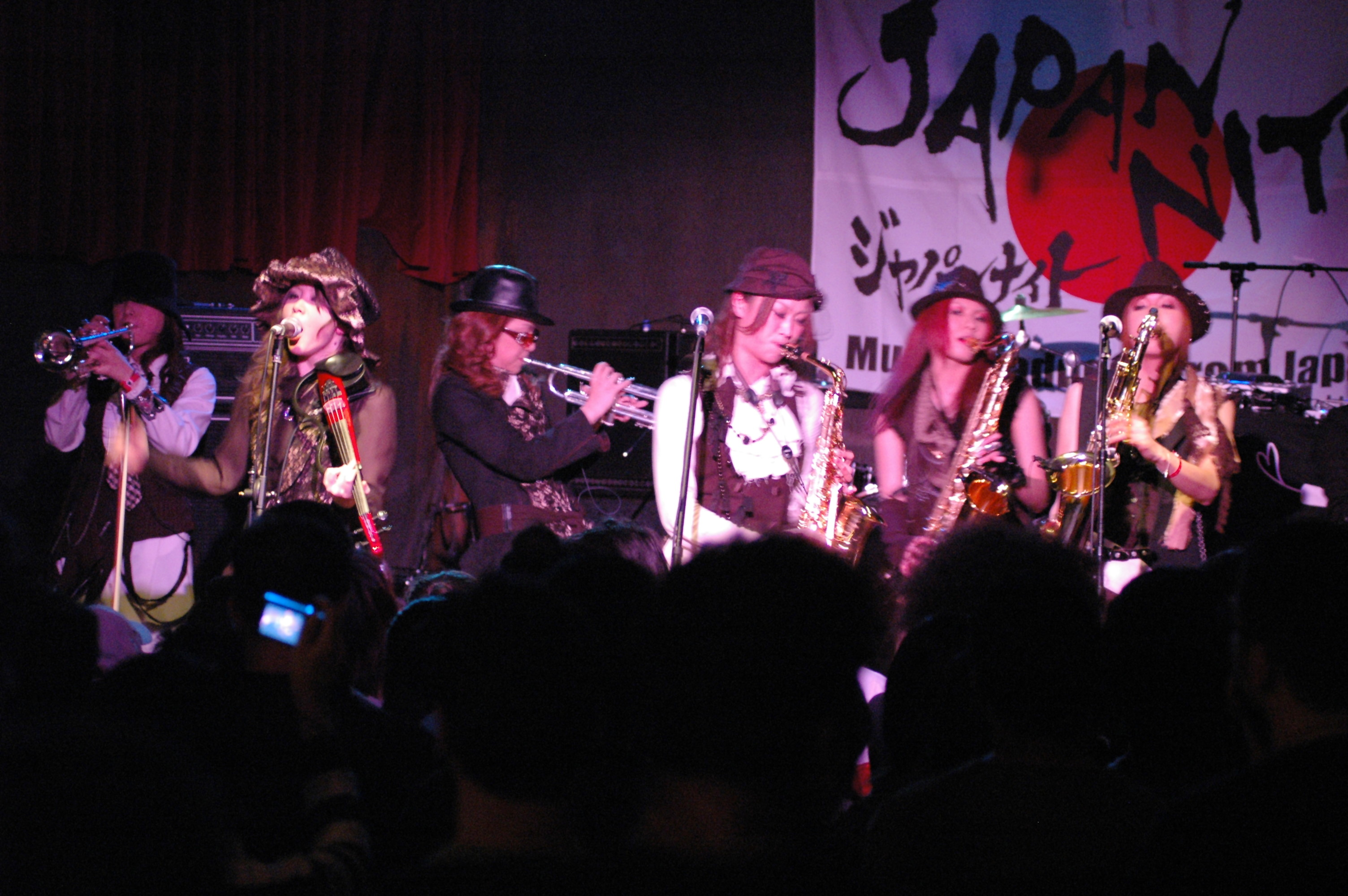
Pistol Valve at Japan Nite 2007

Pistol Valve (ピストルバルブ, Pisutoru Barubu) is a Japanese all-girl brass and rock band, formed in 2005. There are 10 members in this group and every member plays musical instruments.

In 2007, Pistol Valve performed at SXSW as part of the Japan Nite tour.

Their song "OEDO-808" is used for the Japanese release of Mr. Bean's Holiday.

== Members ==
- cotton: Alto saxophone and vocals, leader
- Ando! (アンドー!, Andō!): Tenor saxophone and vocals
- Jenny 7000 (ジェニ7000, Jeni Nanasen): Violin and vocals
- Tomi (とみぃ, Tomī): Euphonium and vocals
- Yoko Brooklyn (ヨーコ Brooklyn, Yōko Burukkurin): Tenor and baritone saxophone
- Lamb Asuka (ラム・アスカ, Ramu Asuka): Trombone
- Corina (コリーナ, Korīna): Trumpet
- Misaty: Trumpet
- M-chan: Trumpet
- DJ Lilia (DJ♮リリア, Dī Jei Riria): Turntable

=== Former members ===
- Akki (アッキ): Alto sax
- Bancho♀: Euphonium
- Asacherry (アサチェリー, Asacherī): Euphonium

== Discography ==
=== Single ===
1. "Pull The TRIGGER!" (15 March 2006)
2. "TREASURES ~Sekai ga Owatte mo~" (TREASURES 〜世界が終わっても〜; 2007-04-25)
3. "Kimi dake Nanda!" (君だけなんだっ!; 2007-07-25)
4. "Zutto-Zutto" (21 November 2007)
5. "Unofficial" (6 August 2008)
6. "My Voice" (22 July 2009)

=== Mini-album ===
1. Pistol-Whip (19 July 2006)

=== Album ===
1. Tsunamic Girls From Tokyo (American debut album) (24 July 2007)
2. RATATATTAT! (23 January 2008)
3. Stick 'em up! (22 October 2008)
4. Love Love Gun (7 October 2009)

=== Rental album ===
1. TRIAL SHOOT! (14 June 2009)
  1. "Good-looking dreamer"
  2. "Pai koso wa Subete ~All You Need Is Pie~" (パイこそはすべて〜All You Need Is Pie〜)
  3. "Pull The TRIGGER!"
  4. "Sit At Cow Char Nail ~Shitta Kotchanē~" (Sit At Cow Char Nail〜シッタコッチャネー〜)
  5. "Fo-Fo"
  6. "My Generation〜Respect to The Who〜"
  7. "THE BEST HOUSE"

=== DVDs ===
1. Pistol Vavle Early Years! (ピストルバルブ Early Years!, Pisutoru Barubu Early Years!; 2006-12-06)
2. Jump The Gun!: Pistol Valve America Tour 2007 (Jump The Gun! 〜ピストルバルブ・アメリカツアー2007〜, Jump The Gun! ~Pisutoru Barubu Amerika Tsuā~; 2008-01-23)
3. Drive-by Shooting: Pistol Valve Europe Tour (drive-by shooting 〜ピストルバルブヨーロッパツアー2008〜, drive-by shooting ~Pisutoru Barubu Yōroppa Tsuā~; 2008-10-22)
