= The Rodeo Carburettor =

Japanese rock band

- Origin: Japan
- Genres: Garage rock; rock and roll; power rock
- Years active: 2001–2010
- Labels: Dynamord; Kowalski; Graveyard Label/Zealot
- Past members: Takeshi Kaji; Makoto Takizawa; Nobuya Sakai

The Rodeo Carburettor was a three-piece Japanese rock band that formed in 2001. The band hardly speaks on-stage (other than announcing the song name). Their use of distortion and noise have often led to comparisons to Guitar Wolf.

In 2005 the band performed at UK's International Music Convention, In The City, in Manchester, along with fellow Japanese artists PE'Z and DMBQ. This was followed with another show at London's The Marquee Club that featured Mika Bomb. In 2006, the band toured the United States as part of the Japan Nite event.

Their song "Speed of Flow" was used as an ending for the anime series Gintama. It reached No. 43 on the Oricon Singles Chart.

The band announced its dissolution in 2010. Vocalist Takeshi Kaji later formed The Valves with guitarist Jean and percussionist Suzuki Akira.

== Discography ==
Extended plays

- Moonlight Dance (月光ダンス) – November 10, 2004
- Pissed Off – March 24, 2005
- God of Hell – November 2, 2005
- Vandalize – August 5, 2009

Albums

- Black Luster Songs – April 19, 2006
- Kingdom – April 18, 2007
- Stripdown JunkYard Mixes – October 15, 2008
- Rowdydow – November 5, 2008

Singles

- "Meaningful / Precious EP" – December 6, 2006
- "Glare" – October 10, 2007
- "Speed of Flow" – February 14, 2008

== Tours ==
- Pissed Off Tour – April, 2005 -> July, 2005
- God of Hell Tour – November 23, 2005 -> December 19, 2005 – 10 cities, 11 locations.

== See also ==
- J-Rock
