= Bleach (Japanese band) =

Japanese rock band

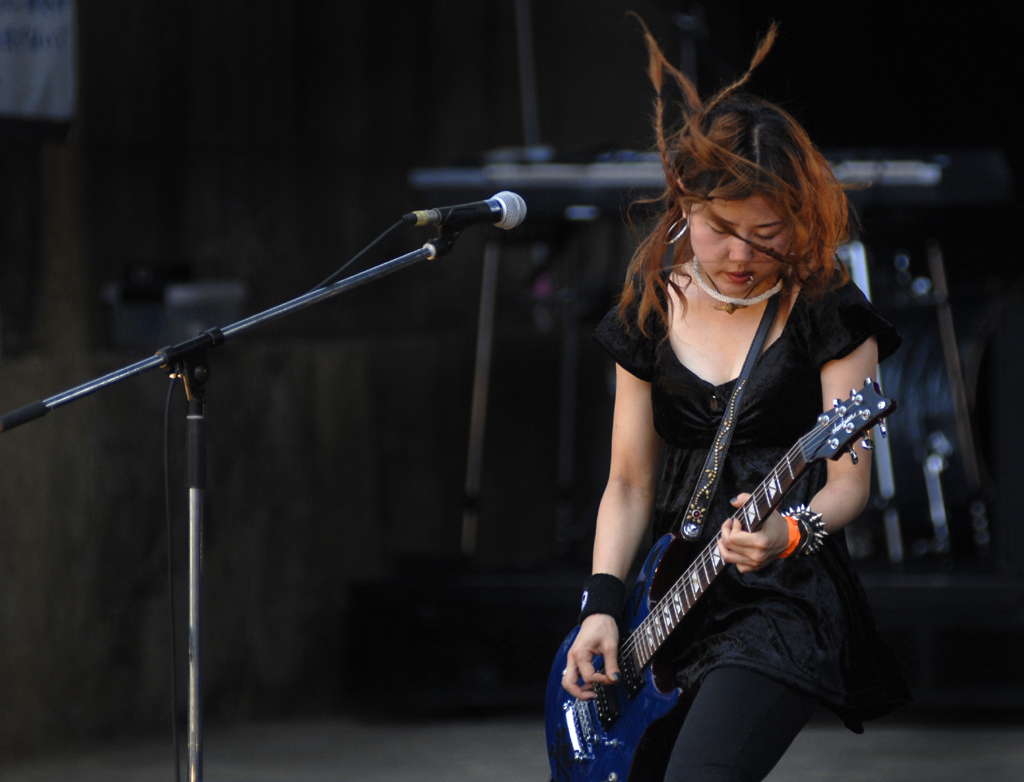
- Kanna in 2007

Background information
- Also known as: Bleach03
- Origin: Okinawa, Japan
- Genres: Thrashcore, D-beat, hardcore punk, noise rock
- Years active: 1997–2009
- Labels: Universal Music Group, Alive
- Past members: Kanna, Miya, Sayuri
- Website: highwave.co.jp/bleach

Bleach (known as Bleach03 in North America) was an all-female noise rock trio from Okinawa, Japan, active from 1997 to 2009.

Bleach was known for their raw and energetic live performances, and the band toured the United States several times as part of the Japan Nite tour. Their song "The Head That Controls Both Right And Left Sides Eats Meats And Slobbers Even Today" appeared in an episode of the television series Mr. Robot.

In 2001, 2002, and 2004, the band toured the United States as part of Japan Nite, including performances at the music festival SXSW.

In June 2009, Bleach announced on their website that they had disbanded. Their final album, Bleach Stone, was released on July 7, 2009. A "Best of" album was released in Japan on February 22, 2010, and came with a DVD video of their last show.

Bleach reunited a few times since then. The records were posted on YouTube for their concert on December 26, 2016, and April 15, 2025. In the comments under one of the YouTube videos, the person who attended it said that they performed at least two shows in 2025.

== Discography ==
EPs

- 2000.07.07 Otokoichokusen (A Man's Way)
- 2001.11.11 Furueru Hana (Trembling Flower)
- 2003.10.10 Canary Teikoku no Gyakushuu (Canary Empire Strikes Back)

Mini-Albums

- 2001.07.07 Odoru Kubi

Albums

- 2000.11.11 Kibaku-Zai (Triggering Device)
- 2001.12.12 Hadaka no Joō (Queen of Nudity)
- 2003.08.05 Three Girls from Okinawa (UK compilation album)
- 2003.12.12 Bleach (Released in the US as Bleach 03 2005.09.06)
- 2006.05.05 Migi Mo Hidari Mo Shihai Suru Atama Wa Kyou Mo Niku O Kui Yodare (The Head That Controls Both Right And Left Sides Eats Meats And Slobbers Even Today)
- 2008.06.06 Kien (High Spirits)
- 2009.07.07 bleach stone

Live albums

- 2001.03.19 Japan Nite 2001: Love Psychedelico/Bleach/The Jerry Lee Phantom/Heart Bazaar (Elbow Room)
- 2002.03.18 Japan Nite 2002: Bleachmobile/The Salinger/ Understatements/Bonkin' Clapper/Nananine/Clammbon (Elbow Room)
- 2004.03.23 Japanese Girls Samurai Tour '04: Bleach/Petty Booka/Noodles/Kokeshi Doll (Knitting Factory Tap Room)
- 2005.10.15 Aqui/Bleach/School Trauma Flashback (Trash; Williamsburg, PA)
- 2005.23.04 Japunks Panic Jamboree No. 8: Spunks/Bleach03/Ed Woods/DJ Mammoth & MC Eagle/Peelander-Z/The Dudoos (CBGB; Manhattan, NY)
