= Mummy the Peepshow =

Japanese punk band

- Origin: Osaka, Japan
- Genres: Garage punk; Noise punk
- Years active: 1994–2003; 2018–2019
- Label: Benten; Triangle
- Past members: Maki Mummy; Rising Yuki-San; Natsu Summer; Youngest Aki; I*D*M*U; Naru☆Shin

Mummy the Peepshow was an all-female garage punk/noise punk band from Osaka, Japan. Formed in 1994, they recorded four full-length albums and featured in many album compilations. They ceased activities in 2004 but briefly resumed in 2018 and 2019.

== History ==
Mummy the Peepshow was formed in 1994. Its original lineup featured Maki Mummy (real name Maki Nakamura) on guitar and lead vocals, Rising Yuki-San on drums and Natsu Summer on bass. Youngest Aki (Akiko Hosoya) joined the group on lead guitar in 1997, making them a four-piece. The band released their debut record, Mummy Builion on Audrey Kimura's Tokyo-based Benten Label in 1998. CDJournal was less than positive of the album, calling the vocals "just beyond redemption."

The following year, in 1999, Rising Yuki-San married and left the band. I*D*M*U (Mayuko Iida) replaced her on drums. Mummy the Peepshow's second album, This is Egg Speaking... was released that same year. Writing for The Japan Times, Simon Bartz included it on his list of top albums of 1999, calling it "delinquent J-pop".

Mummy the Peepshow performed at the U.S. music festival SXSW as part of Japan Nite in 2000. Also in 2000, Naru☆Shin (Naru Ishizuka, later a member of Shonen Knife) joined the band, replacing Natsu Summer on bass. That October, the band released their third album, Electric Rollergirl, which contained a cover of The Smiths' "This Charming Man". Karen E. Graves gave the album a positive review for AllMusic, noting its "sugary sweet, surprisingly catchy pop-punk songs" and likened it to "'50s girl group pop turned punk." At the end of April 2001, Youngest Aki left Mummy the Peepshow and the band continued activities as a trio.

The band released their fourth album, School Girl Pop, on their own label, Triangle Records, in June 2002. Prior to the album's release, the band embarked on a tour of Europe. Maximum Rocknroll called the record "fun, bubblegum stuff with that amateur-ish charm." The following year, Mummy the Peepshow toured America (including a performance at Ladyfest in Texas).

After 2003, the band ceased activities. Maki went on to join the bands Catholic Girlfriends and Foodie. She reformed Mummy the Peepshow for the Midnight Crazy event in 2018 and for Lolita No.18's 30th anniversary concert in 2019. In addition to herself, the new line-up consisted of Akibon on lead guitar, Agya on drums and Yuko on bass.

== Discography ==
- Mummy Builion (1998, Benten Label)
1. "Mummify" - 3:00
2. Kaiketsu! Pubbuta 200 kg(Man of Extraordinary Talent! Fatty 200 kg) - 2:54
3. "MTP Pt 2" - 2:04
4. "Go Mad" - 2:00
5. "D For Die" - 0:52
6. "Fairytale in the Supermarket" - 3:37
7. "I Bub You Bub" - 4:57
8. "Theme of Ten Chel" - 1:28
9. "We Mummyfied" - 1:28
- This is Egg Speaking... (1999, Benten Label)
1. "We Are" - 3:38
2. "Dear Big Tongue" - 2:37
3. "Jenny is Feeling Bad" - 3:31
4. "Annie" - 1:51
5. "Wonder Bread Angel Soup" - 2:31
6. "Dirty Snowy Red Coat" - 2:04
7. "Spring Pants Has Come" - 3:13
8. "Ne Sois Pas Si Bete" - 2:24
9. "Rock Me Bartender" - 4:34
- Electric Rollergirl (2000, Benten Label)
1. "Disco Holiday" (Maki) - 2:26
2. "Skip! Skip!" (Maki) - 3:30
3. "Kick Off!" (Music: Aki, Words: Maki) - 3:13
4. "Girl Friend" (Maki) - 3:44
5. "Bathtime Tune" (Maki) - 3:00
6. "Humming Swing Cycling" (Aki) - 2:14
7. "I'm Not" (Naru) - 2:26
8. "Honey & Sandwich" (Maki) - 3:49
9. "This Charming Man" (Johnny Marr, Morrissey) - 2:45
10. "Starway" (Maki) - 8:04
11. "Good Bye My Roller Girl" (Maki) - 3:11
- School Girl Pop (2002, Triangle Records)
1. "Hide-And-Seek On The Turntable" (Maki) - 3:01
2. "School Girl Pop" (Maki) - 2:06
3. "Red Guitar Story" (Maki) - 2:22
4. "CUT" (Maki) - 3:08
5. "Good Morning!" (Maki) - 2:54
6. "Sailing" (Maki) - 2:39
7. "Hello Stan" (Naru) - 3:08
8. "Good Bye" (Maki) - 1:38
9. "In A Hospital" (Maki) - 3:22
10. "Lady Wendy" (Maki) - 3:05
11. "Good Night" (Maki) - 2:03
12. "(Give Me A) Letter!" (Maki) - 4:08
