= Sydney Sprague =

American musician

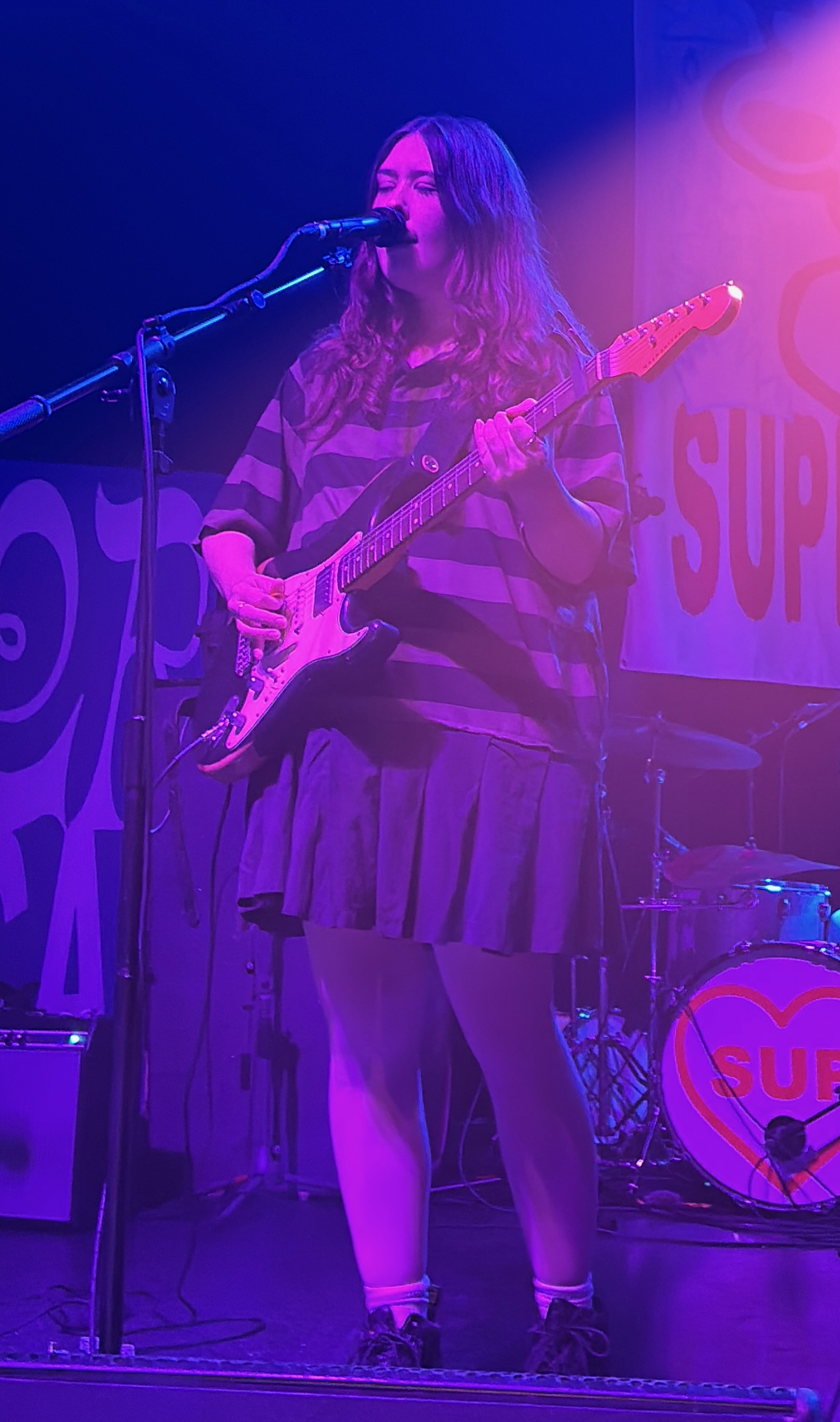
- Sprague playing in 2024

Background information
- Born: February 11, 1992
- Origin: Phoenix, Arizona, U.S.
- Genres: Alternative; indie rock
- Years active: 2014–present
- Website: sydneysprague.com

Sydney Sprague (born 1992) is an American singer-songwriter and multi-instrumentalist from Phoenix, Arizona. She is known for her alt-pop and indie rock style, often blending introspective lyrics with energetic instrumentation. Sprague has released three studio albums: maybe i will see you at the end of the world (2021), somebody in hell loves you (2023), and Peak Experience (2025), and has toured both as a headliner and in support of artists such as Dashboard Confessional, Jimmy Eat World, Oso Oso, Pool Kids, Michigander (band), and The Format.

== Biography ==
In October 2020, Sprague announced that she had signed a recording deal with Rude Records. She released her debut single, "i refuse to die," on the same day. Later that month, she released a second single, "steve." This was followed by the singles "staircase failure," "quitter," "object permanence," and "the end of the world."

On February 26, 2021, she released her debut album, maybe i will see you at the end of the world. A deluxe version of the album was released on September 21, 2021, featuring three additional tracks, including a remix of "steve," an acoustic version of "object permanence," and a demo titled "landmines."

During February and March 2022, Sprague and her band participated in the Surviving the Truth Tour, supporting Dashboard Confessional and Jimmy Eat World.

On September 15, 2023, her sophomore album, somebody in hell loves you, was released via Rude Records, followed by her first headlining tour.

On September 26, 2025, Sprague released her third studio album, Peak Experience, independently. The album features the lead single "Flat Circle" and includes previously released tracks "Fair Field" and "As Scared As Can Be," showcasing a blend of exuberant sound with synthetic textures and innovative production techniques.

Following the release, Sprague opened for The Format in Phoenix.

== Discography ==
Albums

- maybe i will see you at the end of the world (2021, Rude Records)
- somebody in hell loves you (2023, Rude Records)
- Peak Experience (2025)
