= Roller Coaster (Red Bacteria Vacuum album) =

Studio album by Red Bacteria Vacuum
- Released: 1 January 2006
- Genre: Hardcore punk
- Label: Benten Tokyo
- Producer: Nick Howard

Roller Coaster is the 2006 album by Osaka all-female band Red Bacteria Vacuum.

== Track listing ==
1. "Roller Coaster"
2. "Nightmare"
3. "I'm Just A Breast Girl"
4. "Gimme Culture"
5. "No-Ten Fuck!!"
6. "Standing Here..."
