= Stereogirl =

Japanese alternative rock band

Stereogirl ステレオガール
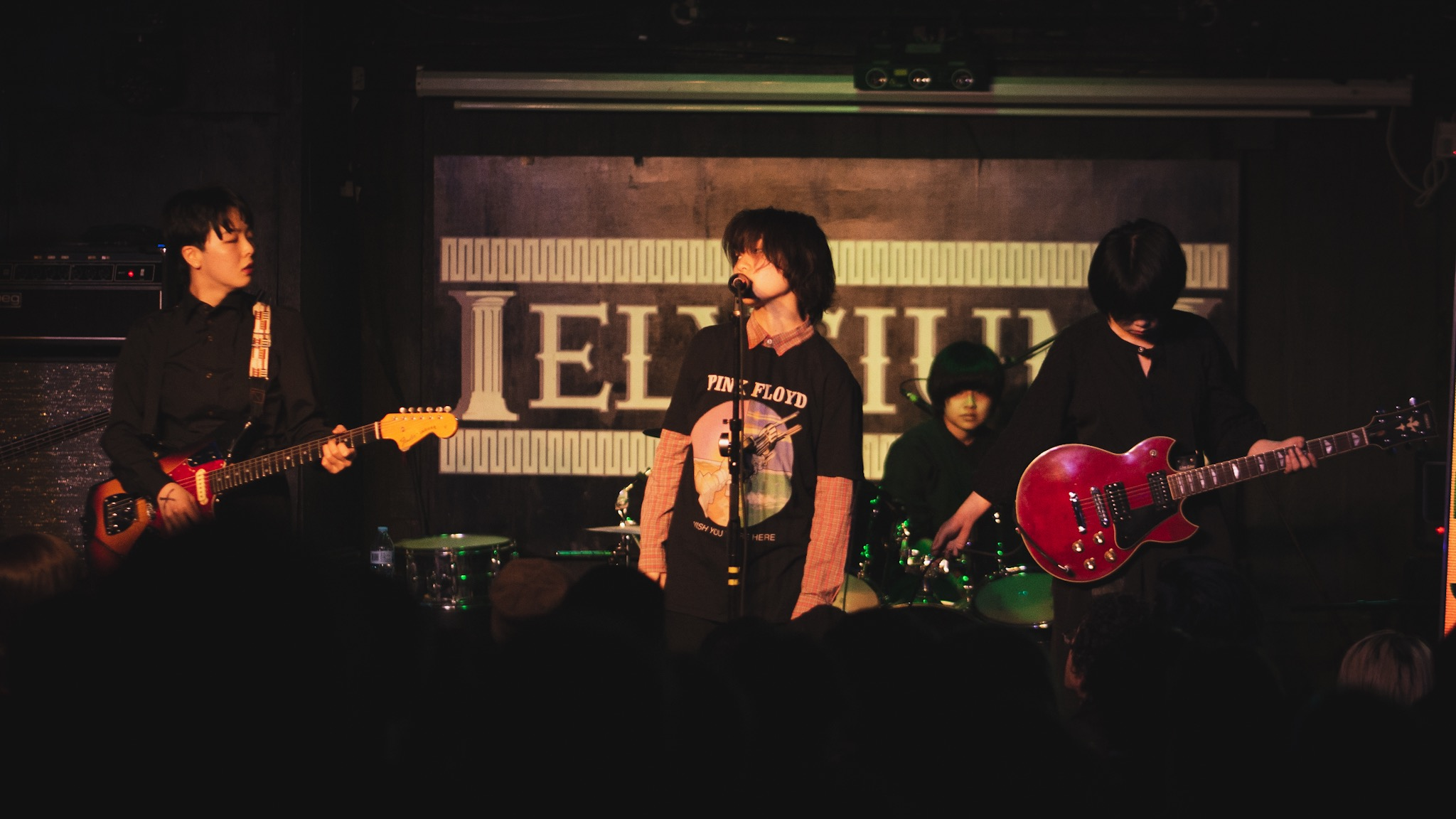
- Stereogirl at South by Southwest in 2019

Background information
- Origin: Tokyo, Japan
- Genre: Alternative rock
- Years active: 2014–present
- Label: Chigakushitsu Records
- Members: Anju Mouri; Usami Riko; Kanako Yoshida; Riku Otsuka; Yuka Tachizaki

Stereogirl (ステレオガール, Sutereogāru) is a Japanese alternative rock band from Tokyo, Japan. It consists of lead vocalist Anju Mouri, guitarists Usami Riko and Kanako Yoshida, bassist Riku Otsuka, and drummer Yuka Tachizaki. Formed in a high school music club in 2014, the band started band activities in 2018 with the release of their debut mini-LP, Baby, Bokura wa L.S.D., which saw considerable success.

The band would later release their debut album, Pink Fog in 2019. The band continued to release music, including their second album, Spirit & Opportunity, in 2022. Originally an all-girl band, Riku Otsuka later joined as the bassist, transitioning the lineup to include both male and female members. The band's music has been described as blending shoegaze, pop-punk, and alternative rock influences, drawing inspiration from American and British bands.

== History ==
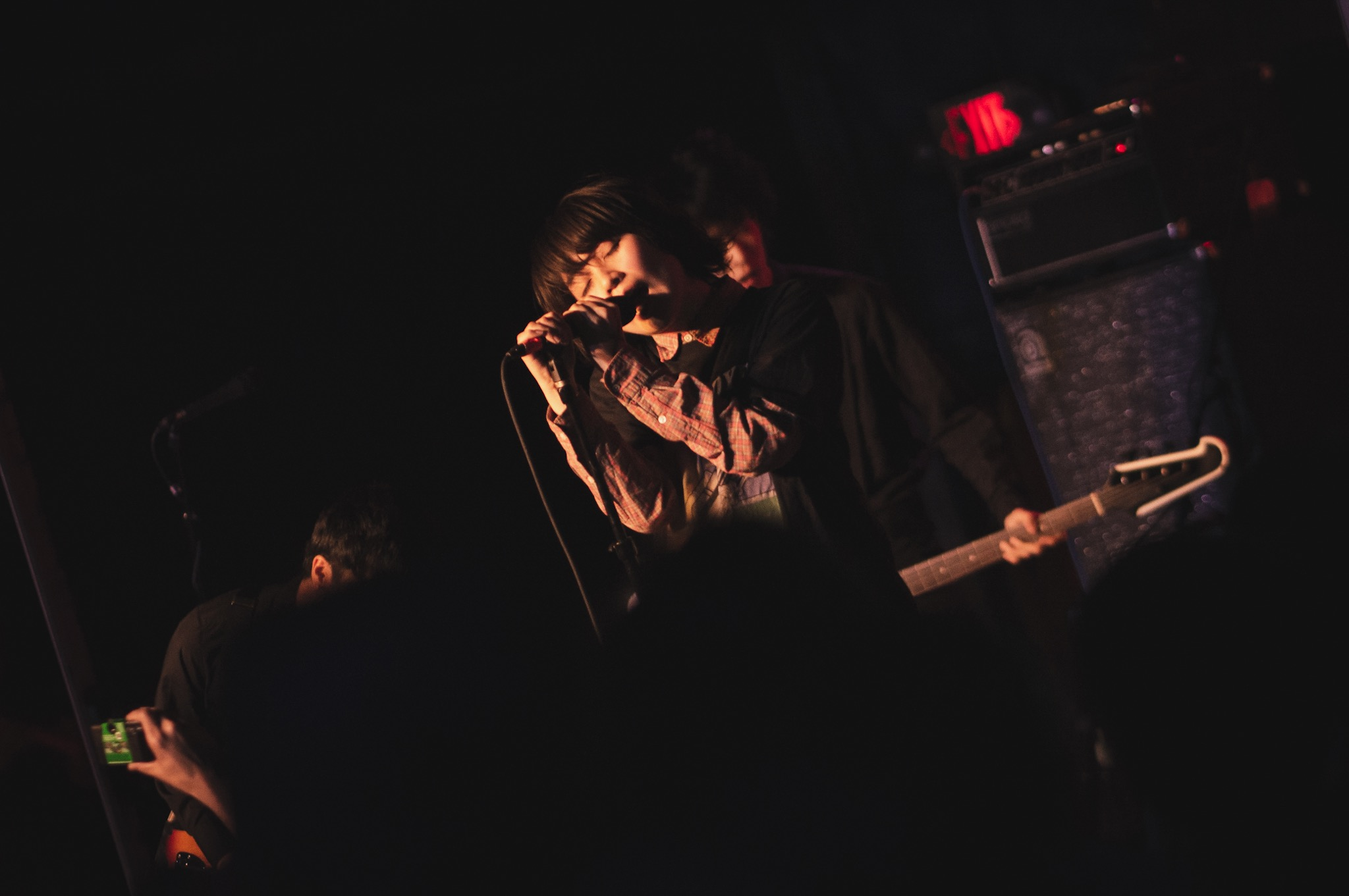
Stereogirl performing in 2019.

Stereogirl was formed within a high school music club, featuring Anju Mohri on vocals and Kanako Yoshida on guitar. After experiencing their classmate Yuka Tachizaki's drumming, they decided to invite her to join the band. Tachizaki agreed on the condition that her friend, Riko "Chamicot" Usami, could join as well. Originally an all-girl band, Riku Otsuka later joined as the bassist after the original bassist quit. Otsuka was a fan and friend of the members before officially becoming part of the band.

On June 1, 2018, they released their debut mini-LP titled Baby, Bokura wa L.S.D., which was repeatedly sold out and restocked at record shops and online stores. On December 3, 2019, the band released the single "Oyasumi Goodnight," their first to be released digitally on streaming services. They released their second mini-LP, NADA, on February 20, 2019.

In March 2020, the band was chosen by Tower Records as a recommended and top pick for the month of April, and on June 3, 2020, the band released their first album, "Pink Fog," which included a remix of "Oyasumi Goodnight." The release was postponed from April 15, and a planned release event in Tokyo was canceled. On February 16, 2022, they released their second album, Spirit & Opportunity, two years after their previous album, Pink Fog. On February 17, 2021, and March 17, they released the songs "Scooter" and "Angel, Here We Come." These releases were their first new singles since the release of Pink Fog and were described as having an alternative rock vibe. In April, they held their first solo concert in Tokyo and Osaka to commemorate the release of their second album. On May 24, 2025, Stereogirl played at Shimokitazawa Sound Cruising 2025 along with multiple other groups.

== Musical style and influences ==
Next Music from Tokyo organizer Steven Tanaka described Stereogirl for the Vancouver Sun as having a "shoegaze-tinged pop-punk sound" that was influenced by American and British bands such as Pavement, The Smiths, and The Stone Roses. He added that they were "writing incredibly catchy, heartfelt songs and are light years ahead of most bands in terms of stage presence." Ed Cunningham of the Tokyo Weekender stated that they combine "punk rock simplicity with the melodic elements of indie rock, spun through a punch of thick, alt-rock layering and shoegaze-esque feedback." Author Ed Cunningham for The Glow described them as "lay[ing] their influences on their sleeve, specializing in catchy, familiar few-chord indie anthems."

== Band members ==
- Anju Mouri (毛利 安寿) – vocals
- Usami Riko (宇佐 美莉子) – guitar
- Kanako Yoshida (吉田 奏子) – guitar
- Riku Otsuka (大塚 理玖) – bass
- Yuka Tachizaki (立崎 ゆか) – drums

== Discography ==
=== Studio albums ===
List of studio albums with chart positions
Title	Album details	Peak chart positions (JP)	
Title	Album details	Albums	Indie Albums
Pink Fog	Released: June 3, 2020; Label: Chigakushitsu Records; Format: CD, streaming	98	9
Spirit & Opportunity	Released: February 16, 2022; Label: Chigakushitsu Records; Format: CD, streaming	—	—
