= Pregnant Fantasy =

Studio album by TsuShiMaMiRe
- Released: August 25, 2004 (Japan); November 1, 2005 (North America)
- Genre: Art punk
- Length: 32:50
- Label: Benten Label Tokyo
- Producer: Nail/Allegro

TsuShiMaMiRe chronology
Pregnant Fantasy (2004)	Noumiso Shortcake (2007)

Alternative cover
- North American cover

Professional ratings
Review scores
Source	Rating
Tiny Mix Tapes	4/5 stars

Pregnant Fantasy ( 創造妊娠 — Souzou Ninshin) is the debut album of the Japanese art punk band TsuShiMaMiRe. It was released on August 25, 2004 in Japan, and then on November 1, 2005 in North America.

== Japanese track listing ==
1. "うめうまいタネデカイ" Umeumai Tanedekai
2. "ランジェリーショップ" Ranjerii Shoppu
3. "海老原眞治" Ebihara Shinji
4. "マンホール" Manhooru
5. "おちゃっすか" Ochassuka
6. "ケダマ" Kedama
7. "きゃまぼ子" Kyamaboko
8. "創造妊娠" Souzou Ninshin

== North American track listing ==
1. "Umeboshi Plums - Big Seeds" – 4:08
2. "Lingerie Shop" – 3:16
3. "Ebihara Shinji" – 2:28
4. "Manhole" – 5:38
5. "Tea time Ska" – 5:10
6. "Kedama Boogie" – 3:50
7. "Fish Cakes" – 3:10
8. "Pregnant Fantasy" – 5:10
