= Petty Booka =

Japanese musical duo

- Origin: Japan
- Genres: Bluegrass; Hawaiian; Country
- Years active: 1995–present
- Label: Benten Label; Sister; Nippon Crown
- Members: Petty; Booka

Petty Booka is a Japanese musical group that consists of Petty and Booka, who sing and play ukulele. Since the duo's formation in 1995, the roles of Petty and Booka have been played by several different women. Most of the band's early output consisted of cover versions of Hawaiian ukulele classics but they also do many covers of well-known rock songs. The duo is based in Japan but has toured Europe and North America.

Petty Booka was formed in 1995 by producer Hiroshi Asada. It was originally composed of two of the former members of punk act The Flamenco A Go Go, Tomomi Asano and Yuka Yamada. The duo got their name from Benten Label owner Audrey Kimura, who called Asano "Petty" and Yuka "Booka-chan". They released their first album, Toconut's Hawaii, in July of 1995. In 1997, Asano left the duo and was replaced in her role as Petty by Naho Moriyama, the daughter of Ryoko Moriyama, in 1999. 1998 saw the release of Blue Lagoon, which was recorded in Hawaii and had artwork by Rockin' Jelly Bean. The album contained various covers, including a version of "I Wanna Be Your Boyfriend" by the Ramones. When asked if there was any connection between punk rock and ukulele music, Petty opined that both share the "same spirit".

In 2001, the duo released Singin' In the Rain, which collected covers of songs about rain, including those by The Carpenters and The Lovin' Spoonful. By 2003, Yuka had departed Petty Booka to take care of her baby and the role of Booka was assumed by Maiko, formerly of Candy Eyeslugger. In a 2005 Plan B article, Françoise Cactus stated that she was "a big fan" of the duo. Also in 2005, Naho left Petty Booka and got married the subsequent year. By 2008, Petty Booka was composed of the two members of The Duet, Mika Hashimoto and Mafuyu Matsuo, a unit formed from idol group Seifuku Kojo Iinkai. By July 2008, Matsuo had left The Duet and was replaced by Saori Kida, who also assumed her role in Petty Booka.

The band has performed several times at the United States music festival SXSW as part of the Japan Nite event. Additionally, Petty Booka toured America with Bad Credit and The Aquabats in 2004. In July 2008, the duo released their latest album, Tokyo Bluegrass Honeys. The record contained bluegrass covers of songs by artists such as The Clash and Earth, Wind and Fire.

== Discography ==
- Toconut's Hawaii (Benten)
- Sweethearts of the Radio
- Blue Lagoon
- Hawaiian Pure Heart
- Fujiyama Mama
- Ukulele Lady
- Singin' in the Rain (Vivid, 2001)
- Dancing with Petty Booka (Benten Tokyo/ACG, 2006)
- Summer Breeze (Crown, 2000)
- Tokyo Bluegrass Honeys (Benten)
