= Happy (band) =

Japanese band

- Origin: Ayabe, Kyoto, Japan
- Genres: indie rock, psychedelic pop
- Years active: 2012—present
- Label: Happy Records
- Members: Alec, Ric, Syu, Bob, Chew
- Website: happyofficial.com

Happy (stylized in Japan as HAPPY) is a five-piece independent Japanese band from Ayabe, Kyoto that formed in 2012. Performing a mix of indie pop and psychedelic pop music, the band sings exclusively in English. In 2014 they released their debut album Hello.

== Biography ==
The band formed in January 2012 in Ayabe, Kyoto when childhood friends Alec, Ric, Syu and Bob decided to create a band. Alec, Ric and Bob had gone to the same elementary school, and met Syu in junior high school. All four of the band members were a part of their school's basketball club, and performed their first live concert on a float for their town Ayabe's Christmas parade, in junior high school.

After giving up music for a while because of how busy basketball club was making them, Alex, Bob and Syu reformed as a three-member band, inspired by the music of The Doors. Ric joined the band later, performing keyboards, and the group became more interested in psychedelic music, as well as the music of The Velvet Underground and Pink Floyd's debut album The Piper at the Gates of Dawn (1967) when they continued to play through their high school years. In their final years of high school, the band members became friends with Koji Shimotsu of the band Odotte Bakari no Kuni, who introduced them to more recent musical acts such as Justice and Gorillaz, heavily influencing the band's sound.

Chew joined the band in 2012, when the group officially became Happy. He had known the other members after meeting them at basketball matches between their high schools. When the members were still living in Ayabe, they went to stay at Chew's apartment in Osaka when they performed live concerts in Osaka and Kobe, eventually leading Chew to join the band. In 2013 performed at the Summer Sonic Festival, and in March 2014 performed a tour in the United States with Japan Nite, an event organized by South by Southwest.

The band released their first single in March 2014 exclusively to Tower Records stores, Sun, featuring the songs "Lift this Weight" and "Win Key Gun". This was followed by a double A-side single "Wake Up" / "Lucy" in June, also exclusive to Tower Records. These singles led up to the release of their debut album Hello in October 2014, released under their own independent label Happy Records. In May 2015, the band released a follow-up extended play To the Next, led by the song "R.A.D.I.O.". In September 2015, Happy released a collaboration EP with electronic band 80kidz.

== Artistry ==
The band are inspired by 1960s and 1970s Western music. Each member has more than one role in the band, performing on multiple instruments. CDJournal reviewers likened the band to American band MGMT and Australian band Tame Impala, praising the emotional falsetto vocals of lead singer Alec. In January 2015, Hello was listed in the shortlist for the top album of the year for the 2015 CD Shop Awards.

== Members ==
- Alec (born November 16, 1993) - guitar and vocals
- Ric (born January 4, 1994) - synthesizers and vocals
- Chew (born October 3, 1993) - guitar and synthesizers
- Syu (born February 28, 1994) - bass guitar and synthesizers
- Bob (born September 11, 1992) - drums and vocals

== Discography ==
=== Studio album ===
List of albums, with selected chart positions
Title	Album details	Peak positions
Title	Album details	JPN
Hello	Released: October 28, 2014 (JPN); Label: Happy Records; Formats: CD, digital download	41

=== Extended plays ===
List of extended plays, with selected chart positions
Title	Album details	Peak positions
Title	Album details	JPN
To the Next	Released: May 13, 2015 (JPN); Label: Happy Records; Formats: CD, digital download	31
Stone Free	Released: July 14, 2017 (JPN); Label: Happy Records; Formats: CD, digital download	—

=== Singles ===
==== As lead artists ====
List of singles, with selected chart positions
Title	Year	Peak chart positions		Album
Title	Year	JPN Oricon	JPN Hot 100 (Note: Sources for chart positions are as follows: "Lucy", "R.A.D.I.O.".)	Album
Sun (Note: Two track single featuring the songs "Lift this Weight" and "Win Key Gun".)	2014	76	—	Hello
"Wake Up"	2014	82	—	Hello
"Lucy"	2014	82	79	Hello
"Mellow Fellow"	2017	—	—	Stone Free
"Hey"	2017	—	—	Stone Free

==== As featured artists ====
Title	Year	Peak chart positions	Album
Title	Year	JPN Hot 100	Album
"Baby" (80kidz featuring Happy)	2015	— (Note: Charted at number 88 on the Billboard Radio Songs subchart.)	Baby EP

=== Promotional singles ===
Title	Year	Peak chart positions	Album
Title	Year	JPN Hot 100	Album
"Magic"	2014	— (Note: Charted at number 84 on the Billboard Radio Songs subchart.)	Hello
"R.A.D.I.O."	2015	89	To the Next
"Cation"	2015	— (Note: Charted at number 95 on the Billboard Radio Songs subchart.)	To the Next
"Stone Free"	2018	—	Stone Free
