= Lolita No.18 =

Japanese band

Lolita No. 18 ロリータ18号
- Origin: Japan
- Genre: Punk rock
- Years active: 1989–present
- Label: Benten Label; Crown; Destroin
- Members: Masayo Ishizaka; Morimi; Takochi; Yuka Yoshimura; Ryoko Nakano
- Past members: Kim*Rin; Enazo; Aya Bow; To-Bu; Gorô; Tacchamen; Light; Kick; Chi-chan
- Website: Official site

Lolita No.18 (ロリータ18号) is a Japanese all-girl punk rock band formed in 1989, known for their cartoony, high-pitched vocals.

== History ==
Masayo Ishizaka formed Lolita No. 18 in 1989, while a high school student, along with her childhood friend, Ai. They had numerous ideas for band names but through a lottery process selected "Lolita No. 18". The name was inspired by the Jun Togawa song "Lolita No. 108", which Masayo had slightly misremembered at the time. The band started out covering songs by Kenzi and the Trips as well as other punk bands, such as the Sex Pistols and The Stalin. By 1993, the band's lineup was set with Masayo on vocals, Enazo on guitar, Kim*Rin on bass and Aya Bow on drums. Lolita No. 18 later opened for Shonen Knife at their Hosei University show after passing an audition. Audrey Kimura of Benten Label saw a video recording of that performance and took an interest in the group, extending an invitation to appear on the label's 1994 omnibus album Benten Bento. Lolita No. 18 contributed two tracks to the record, which were described as "slow, harsh, painful and cool" and "cheerful pop-punk". The following year, Lolita No. 18 released their debut album, Karate Teacher, on Benten Label.

Lolita No. 18 travelled to Texas to record their second album, Sister Run Naked, which was released in July 1996. That same year they performed at the inaugural Japan Nite event at SXSW, becoming the first Japanese band to play at the festival. In 1997, Lolita No. 18 made their major label debut with Hige-Ninja, which was distributed by Nippon Crown under Benten's "sister label" Sister Records. This was followed up with Fubo Love New York, released in July 1998. Recorded in New York, it was produced by Joey Ramone. In their mini review of the record, CD Journal described it as "bursting with punk sound".

To celebrate the tenth anniversary of their formation, the band released Yalitamin in 1999. The album, which The Japan Times called Lolita No. 18's best album, contained covers of various artists, including the Ramones and enka singer Kiyoko Suizenji. During this time, Joe Darone of The Fiendz included Lolita No. 18 as one of his favorite up-and-coming bands. Several months after Yalitamin, Lolita No. 18 released their sixth album of original material, Toy Doll, which was produced by Olga of Toy Dolls fame. In March 2000, the band toured America and then Europe in May and June. Later in the year, they released their seventh studio album, Toriningen, which was once again produced by Olga. At the end of 2001, Enazo and Kim*Rin left Lolita No. 18 following their concert on December 28 at Club Quattro in Shibuya.

== Members ==
- Masayo Ishizaka (石坂マサヨ) - vocals (1989-)
- Morimi (もりみ) - guitar
- Takochi (たこち) - bass (2002-)
- Yuka Yoshimura (吉村由加) - drums
- Ryoko Nakano (中野良子) - drums (from BO-PEEP)

=== Former members ===
- Kim*Rin (キム☆リン) - original bassist (-2001)
- Enazo (エナゾゥ) - original guitarist (-2001)
- Aya Bow (アヤ坊 ) - drum & chorus (-2001)
- TO-BU - drums (2007-2015)
- Gorô (ゴロー) - second guitarist (-2005)
- Tacchamen (タッチャメン) - guitar (2002-2009)
- Light (ライト) - guitar (2009-2010)
- Kick - guitar (2010-2017)
- Chi-chan - drums (2015-2018)

== Discography ==
- 1995 - カラテの先生 (Karate Teacher)
- 1996 - 姉さん裸走り (Sister Run Naked)
- 1997 - 髭忍者 (Hige-Ninja)
- 1998 - 父母♡NY (FUBO LOVE NY) produced by Joey Ramone
- 1999 - ヤリタミン (YALITAMIN)
- 1999 - TOY DOLL (produced by Olga of the Toy Dolls)
- 2000 - ロリータ18号ライブ1995-1996 (Lolita No.18 Live 1995-1996)
- 2000 - 副隊長 (fukutaichou)
- 2000 - TOY DOLL TOUR 2000
- 2000 - 鳥人間 (toriningen, released in UK as Angel of The North) produced by Olga of the Toy Dolls
- 2001 - THE GREAT ROCK'N'ROLL FESTIVAL!!
- 2002 - BEST OF LOLITA No.18
- 2003 - DESTROIN
- 2004 - LOLITA LET’S(ラ)GO!GO!!GO!!!
- 2005 - CHECK THE MARTEN
- 2005 - NUTS THE ANIMAL
- 2010 - アキラメルカ？ (AKIRAMERUKA?)
- 2012 - Yes, Punk Rock, Call With Me!!!
- 2016 - LOLITAAA！！！
- 2017 - カブレサス
- 2018 - kinder PUN market
