= TsuShiMaMiRe =

Japanese all-female rock band

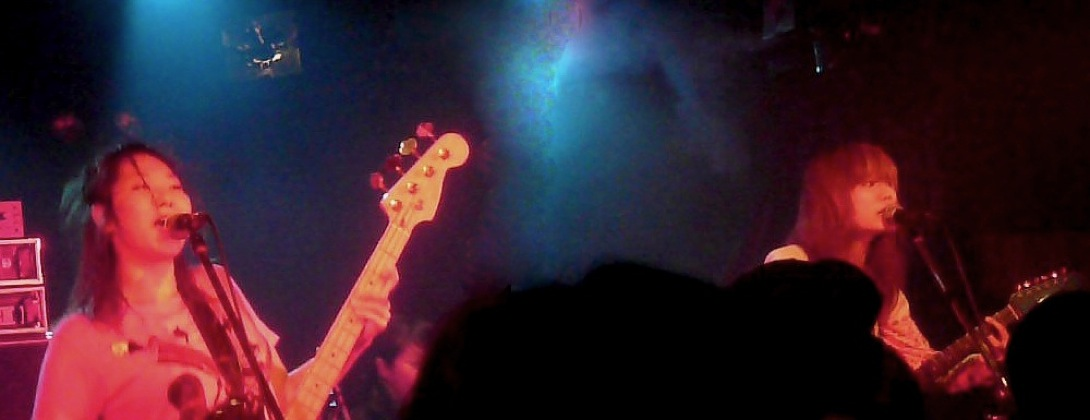
- Performing in Japan, 2008

Background information
- Origin: Chiba Prefecture, Japan
- Genres: Punk rock; art punk; pop punk; post-hardcore; indie rock
- Years active: 1999-present
- Labels: Benten Label; Australian Cattle God; Benten Tokyo; July; FlyingStar; Mojor
- Members: Mari Kono; Yayoi Tsushima; Asami Suzuki
- Past members: Mizue Masuda (1999-2017); Maiko Takagi (2017-2024)
- Website: www.tsushimamire.com

TsuShiMaMiRe (つしまみれ; abbreviated TSMMR) is a Japanese all-female rock trio, formed in 1999. Based in Chiba, the band's original lineup consisted of college students Mari Kono (lead guitar and vocals), Yayoi Tsushima (bass), and Mizue Masuda (drums). Throughout the course of their career, TsuShiMaMiRe has performed not just in Japan but also overseas, in such countries as the United States, Germany and Australia.

== Origin of the name ==
Tsushimamire is a made-up word coined by the band. It is a combination of "Tsushima" (the family name of bassist Yayoi) with "Ma" (from guitarist/vocalist Mari Kono) and "Mi" (from original drummer Mizue Masuda). In addition, mamire means "mix together" or "mixture/full of/all over" in Japanese. Thus, as explained by Mari, the meaning is that of "the three of us will mix together to create a new type of music".

== Musical style and themes ==
TsuShiMaMiRe's musical style has been classified as punk rock or art punk, with eclectic influences of noise and Japanese pop music. Their lyrics are often quirky and idiosyncratic, with common themes including sex, food, love and peace and darker subjects such as death.

With a relatively raw production style, bass-heavy songwriting, and overdriven guitars, the band's sound leans heavily into punk rock. However, this is juxtaposed with unconventional sound design and song structures that lean more into art punk.

== Influences ==
In interviews, the band members have stated that their original inspiration was to be a female version of the Japanese band Blankey Jet City, who make rock music that is very fast, energetic, and full of rapid changes. Mizue named the band's drummer, Tatsuya Nakamura, as a musician she respects. They also consider Rage Against the Machine to be an influence as well as local folk songs from their hometowns, such as "Yasuki-bushi". Yayoi has also expressed a fondness for Western classical music, citing Chopin, Brahms and "Sabre Dance" by Aram Khatchaturian.

== History ==
Mari (lead vocals and guitar), Mizue (backing vocals and drums) and Yayoi Tsushima (backing vocals and bass guitar) formed TsuShiMaMiRe in 1999 while they were students at Chiba University, in the school's Sound House Zoo band club. The trio started out covering Blankey Jet City songs, after Mari was inspired by their performance at Akasaka Blitz, playing in various clubs in Chiba Prefecture. TsuShiMaMiRe then released their first demo single, "Hamburger Set", in 2000. This was followed by the release of their second demo single "Bloody Mohawk" [Ryuketsu Mohikan] in 2001. The band submitted recordings made at the university to various record labels, with EMI taking a particular interest. EMI then introduced them to the owner of Benten Label.

As the label was active in promoting US tours for their roster, they encouraged TsuShiMaMiRe to embark on such a tour before releasing their first studio album. Thus, in March 2004, they toured the United States with other Japanese bands Petty Booka, Bleach, Noodles, and Kokeshi Doll, including performing at the South by Southwest Japan Nite showcase. On August 25 of the same year, TsuShiMaMiRe released their first full-length album, Pregnant Fantasy, on Benten Label. Mari would later describe the album as being "full of passion and urge."

In March 2005, they toured the United States once again in the "Japan Girls Nite US Tour." Along with some of their previous tour mates, this excursion included notable rock group The Pillows. Though the short tour only went through a few cities such as Chicago, New York, Seattle, Boston, Los Angeles, and San Francisco, the tour was met warmly and gave them extra exposure. That November, Pregnant Fantasy was released in the United States under the Benten Tokyo label, formed out of a partnership by Benten Label and Australian Cattle God Records.

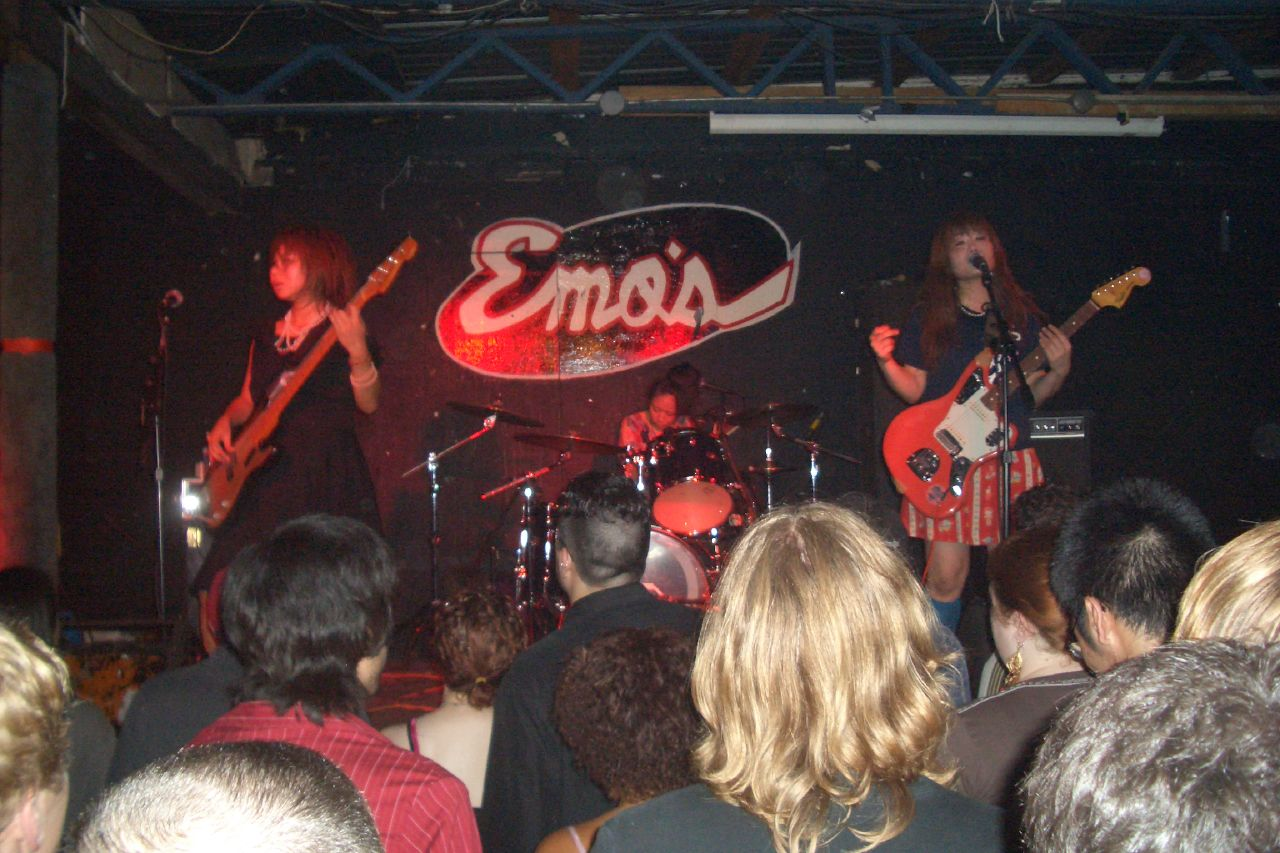
Performing at Emo's, Austin, in 2005

Later in the year, TsuShiMaMiRe performed as the opening act for the "Suicide Girls Live Burlesque Tour" which involved a grueling thirty-five shows in about one month's time, September 30 through November 5. The band commented that the tour gave them the chance to "develop a new audience" and that they "never had such a large crowd before" at their shows. After the Suicide Girls tour, they also played a few small west coast dates with other Japanese girl bands, once again part of the Benten Label's "Girls Nite Tour."

In May 2006, TsuShiMaMiRe performed at Anime Central, marking their first American convention appearance. A few months later, they toured a second time with the Suicide Girls but the tour was cut short when the latter changed plans to become the opening act for Guns N' Roses. As the last several shows were suddenly cancelled, TsuShiMaMiRe played a few hastily arranged shows on the west coast.

In March 2007, they won the "All-Girl Band" vote in Shojo Beat magazine's reader's poll, with 73.4% of the vote. On July 7, 2007, TsuShiMaMiRe released their next album, Brain Shortcake (脳みそショートケーキ, Nōmiso Shortcake), which was released through July Records. A few months later, on September 15, TSMMR were featured on Mozilla Japan's Firefox Rock Festival, which was streamed from Tokyo live over the internet.

In 2010, TsuShiMaMiRe released Sex on the Beach, their second album under major Japanese label, FlyingStar Records. Mari explained that she and her bandmates drank the cocktail of the same name after their US tour performances. It charted on the Billboard Japan Top Album Sales chart, reaching number 99. The record, described as being "chock full of punky noise fun", was released in America by Good Charamel Records. In November 2010 they toured the US with Japanese punk band Peelander-Z.

In 2015, the band released the LP Abandon Human. The following year they toured in support of the album, visiting the United States twice (west coast and east coast), and at the end of the year they also had their first ever European tour, playing shows in and around Germany. They attempted to play at a festival in Russia, but could not enter the country due to visa problems.

In January 2017, drummer Mizue announced that, after 17 1/2 years, she was leaving TsuShiMaMiRe to pursue other projects. The three original members had been together since their college days. Their last show together took place in Chiba, Japan, where they got their start and it was later released on DVD.

In 2017 following Mizue's departure, drummer Maiko Takagi (ex. BUMBUMS/ Spinoza) joined the band as a support drummer for the TsuShiMaMiRe World Tour 2017 in Europe. Shortly after joining, Maiko was announced the new official drummer for Tsushimamire. In October 2017, the band released another album, NEW.

The band was also backed briefly in 2017 by support drummer Shigeru Toyota (formerly of Usotsuki Barbie), with whom they recorded and released the album Tsushimageru.

On 26 September 2024 TsuShiMaMiRe performed a set on KEXP. Shortly after, the band collaborated with game developer, Epic Games in the creation of the song "Break the Curse" for Epic Games' December update of Fortnite. The band made their Australian debut in February 2026, with five tour dates throughout the country. During the tour, they performed a set on the 3CR radio show The Vibe Consultant.

== Discography ==
=== Soundtracks ===
- Paper Beast (Videogame) w/Roly Porter (2020)

=== Live DVDs ===
- 良いDVDです。 (Yoi DVD Desu.) (2005)
- Live DVD (2006)
- バンドは水物 (Band wa Mizumono) 10th Anniversary (2009)
- Blood Movie (2012)
- NO PUNK (2013)
- 15周年記念LIVE DVD「バンドは水物2」(15th Anniversary) (2014)
- HANAMAMIRE 2016 [LIVE at daikanyama UNIT] (2016)
- Mari, Yayoi & Mizue's Live DVD [LIVE at Chiba LOOK] (2017)

=== Music videos ===
- エアコンのリモコン (Air Control & Remote Control) (animated, 2007)
- Sakuranboy (2008)
- Mi Kara Deta Sabi (2008)
- Hyper Sweet Power (2009)
- タイムラグ (Time Lag) (2009)
- まつり (Matsuri) (2009)
- ストロボ (Strobe) (2010)
- 献血ソング (Blood Song) (2011)
- グレープフルーツガール (Grapefruit girl) (2011)
- Hungry and Empty (2012)
- JAGUAR (2013)
- Bad Dream Bear (2013)
- Speedy Wonder (2014)
- Ningen Coating (2015)
- Hang Out! (2015)
- Under the Sky of Yesterday (animated, 2015)
- Tokyo Jellyfish (2017)
- Tsushimageru (2017)
- Anarchy Morning (2018)
- The Payday (2019)
- LUCKY (2021)
- SHOT YOU (2021)
