= Valeria Kozlova =

Russian musician (born 1988)

Lera Kozlova
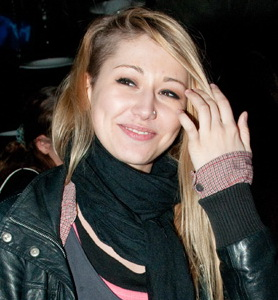
- Kozlova in 2011

Background information
- Also known as: LeRa, LeRanetka, LERALERA, Lera Romantika, Lera Ranetka
- Born: 22 January 1988 (age 38); Moscow, Russian SFSR, Soviet Union
- Genres: Pop-rock; pop; dance-pop; R&B
- Occupations: Singer; musician; actress
- Instruments: Vocals; drums
- Years active: 2005–present
- Labels: Megaliner Records (2005–2008); KRUZHEVA Music (2009–2011); Zion Music (2015–2017); Warner Music Russia (2020–present)

Valeriya Sergeevna Kozlova (Russian: Валерия Сергеевна Козлова; (born 22 January 1988), better known as Lera Kozlova, is a Russian musician most famous for her work with the pop-rock band Ranetki where she provided the vocals and played the drums (from 2005 to 2008). She is also the former vocalist of the band 5sta Family (from 2015 to 2017).

== Early life ==
Kozlova was born in Moscow. At 12 years old, she studied at the "Pinocchio" children's ensemble, where she learned to sing and play percussion instruments.

== Life and career ==
=== "Ranetki Girls" (2005–2008) ===
In 2005–2008 she was the vocalist and drummer of the band "Ranetki", and also starred in the television series of the same name produced by the STS channel. The band participated in the tv-shows "Make kids" on MTV and "5 stars" on Channel One.

In 2006, the group recorded the first album "Ranetki" ("Ранетки") (Label "Megaliner Records"). In the same year she took part in the recording of the album "Lords of the Universe" ("Властелины Вселенной") of the Moscow punk rock band "Tarakany!" ("Тараканы!"). In 2008 participated in the recording of singles for the second album "Our Time Has Come" ("Пришло наше время").

According to the results of 2008, she received the People's Prize of Ukraine in the nomination "Discovery of the Year".

1 November 2008 Lera gave the last concert as part of the band "Ranetki", which is in the Luzhniki Palace of Sports. 2 November 2008 it was revealed that Lera had left "Ranetki", under pressure of former boyfriend, producer Sergey Milnichenko.

=== Solo career: "LeRa", "LERALERA" (2009–2011) ===
In 2009, she began a solo career under the pseudonym "LeRa" ("ЛеРа"). Gela Romanovsky became her producer. The first LeRa recital took place on 20 February 2009 in Samara (Russia). In the fall, the premiere of the debut album was expected which has been given the tentative title "My Summer Rain" ("Мой Летний Дождь"), but the release never took place.

At the end of 2009, she took up the solo project "LERALERA" under the production of Yuri Bardash (label "KRUZHEVA Music"). In the same year, Lera starred in the video of the band Quest Pistols for the song "He Is Near" ("Он Рядом"). In 2010, clips were released for the songs "She-Wolf" ("Волчица"), "Unpleasant" ("Неприятно"), "Safe Sex" ("Безопасный Секс").

In June 2010, a new debut album entitled "Give Me A Sign" ("Дай Мне Знак") was released. The album was released on 7 July 2010 in Ukraine. The album was released in Russia in December 2010. In the same year, the release of the game "LERALERA. Beginner's Star School" ("LERALERA. Школа начинающей звезды").

In 2010, after season 5, Lera left the series "Ranetki". In July 2011, together with the bands "Nerves" and "Khaki" ("Хаки") went on a joint tour "Summer, swim trunks, rock 'n' roll!" ("Лето, плавки, рок-н-ролл!").

In 2011, at the "OOPS" magazine party, Lera announced the closure of the "LERALERA" project and her departure from the scene.

=== "5sta Family" (2015–2017) ===
On 23 May 2015, members of the band "5sta Family" reported that Lera became the new vocalist instead of Yulianna Karaulova. On 8 July, the single "Aptly" ("Метко") was released, which became a presentation for Lera in the band.

21 January 2016 released the second single "Erasing the Borders" ("Стирая границы").

On 6 May 2016, the single "5sta Family" "T-shirt" ("Футболка") was released, and on 24 May a clip.

On 24 January 2017, the single "5sta Family" "Vesuvius" ("Везувий") was released.

On 30 April, the single and clip "5sta Family" "High-Rises" ("Многоэтажки") was released.

On 5 November, on her Instagram, Valeria announced that on 2 December in Nizhny Novgorod, the last concert with her participation as part of the band "5sta Family" will be held.

=== "KURAGA" (2017–2019) ===
In May 2017, former members of the band "Ranetki" created the YouTube channel KURAGA, dedicated to their life after the end of the group. In parallel with this, the girls began work on the reunion of the band (consisting of Kozlova, Tretyakova, Ogurtsova, Baydavletova, Rudneva). Later, the latter refused to participate in the reunion. The project also began to have problems due to threats from the former producer of the band "Ranetki" Sergey Milnichenko.

On 29 June 2019, Lera performed at the festival "Generation NEXT" as part of the ex-"Ranetki".

=== "NYUTA&LERA" (2019–2020) ===
On 8 November 2019, Lera announced the creation of a musical duet called "NYUTA&LERA" together with Anna "Nyuta" Baydavletova under the label "Warner Music Russia". On 14 February 2020, the first song "My Boy" was premiered. In the summer of 2020, Baidavletova announced on her Instagram page the closure of the project on her own initiative.

== Discography ==
=== Studio albums ===
- Ranetki (Ранетки) (2006) – Ranetki Girls
- Give Me a Sign (Дай Мне Знак) (2010) – LERALERA

=== Backing vocal ===
- Lords of the Universe (Властелины Вселенной) (2006) – Tarakany!

=== Songs ===
Title	Year	Album
Ranetki Girls
9 класс (Devyatyy klass, 9th grade)	2005	no album
Надо рискнуть (Nado risknut', We must take a chance)	2005	no album
Пусть идут дожди (Pust' idut dozhdi, Let it rain)	2005	no album
Московские окна (Moskovskiye okna, Moscow Windows)	2005	no album
Sunny (Cover version)	2005	no album
Venus (Cover version)	2005	no album
Мы Ранетки (My Ranetki, We are Ranetki)	2005	Ranetki
Она одна (Ona odna, Shes Alone)	2005	Ranetki
Мальчишки-кадеты (Mal'chishki-kadety, Boys – Cadets)	2005	Ranetki
В Москве всегда весна (V Moskve vsegda vesna, It's always spring in Moscow)	2005	Ranetki
Зима (Zima, Winter)	2005	Ranetki
Алиса (Alisa, Alice)	2005	Ranetki
Сердце не спит (Serdtse ne spit, Heart Doesn't Sleep)	2006	Ranetki
Ангелы (Angely, Angels)	2006	Ranetki
Angels (English version)	2006	Ranetki
Это всё о ней (Eto vso o ney, It's All About Her)	2006	Ranetki
О тебе (O tebe, About you)	2006	Ranetki
Он вернётся (On vernotsya, He Will Return)	2006	Ranetki
Тебя любила я (Tebya lyubila ya, I Loved You)	2006	Ranetki
Ей не до сна (Yey ne do sna, She Can't Sleep)	2006	Ranetki
Обещай (Obeshchay, Promise)	2008	Our Time Has Come
Чемпионы любви (Chempiony lyubvi, Champions of Love)	2008	Our Time Has Come
Нас не изменят (Nas ne izmenyat, They'll Not Change Us)	2008	Our Time Has Come
Я в шоке (YA v shoke, I'm in Shock)	2008	Our Time Has Come
Нет мира без тебя (Net mira bez tebya, There is No World Without You)	2008	Our Time Has Come
LeRa
Было или не было (Bylo ili ne bylo, Was Or Wasn't)	2009	My Summer Rain (album didn't come out)
Вечеринка (Vecherinka, A Party)	2009	My Summer Rain (album didn't come out)
Всё это не просто (Vso eto ne prosto, All This is Not Easy)	2009	My Summer Rain (album didn't come out)
Сердце не плачь (Serdtse ne plach', Don't Cry Heart)	2009	My Summer Rain (album didn't come out)
Там (Tam, There)	2009	My Summer Rain (album didn't come out)
Вова (Vova, Vova)	2009	My Summer Rain (album didn't come out)
Встретишь, полюбишь (Vstretish', polyubish', Meet, Love)	2009	My Summer Rain (album didn't come out)
Эта музыка (Eta muzyka, This Music)	2009	My Summer Rain (album didn't come out)
Рядом (Ryadom, Beside)	2009	My Summer Rain (album didn't come out)
Тает снег (Tayet sneg, The Snow Melts)	2009	My Summer Rain (album didn't come out)
Последний звонок (Posledniy zvonok, Last Call)	2009	My Summer Rain (album didn't come out)
Не хватает мне тебя (Ne khvatayet mne tebya, I Miss You)	2009	My Summer Rain (album didn't come out)
Ничего не бойся (Nichego ne boysya, Don't be Afraid of Anything)	2009	My Summer Rain (album didn't come out)
Близко, но не рядом ты (Blizko, no ne ryadom ty, Close, But Not Near you)	2009	My Summer Rain (album didn't come out)
LeRa (Band Miami)	2009	
Одиночка (Odinochka, Loner)	2009	no album
Убегу (Ubegu, I'll Run Away)		no album
LERALERA
Медленные дни (Medlennyye dni, Slow Days)	2010	Give Me A Sign
13-й февраль (Trinadtsatyy fevral', Thirteenth February)	2010	Give Me A Sign
Неприятно (Nepriyatno, Unpleasant)	2010	Give Me A Sign
До свидания (Do svidaniya, Goodbye)	2010	Give Me A Sign
Леди (Ledi, Lady)	2010	Give Me A Sign
Слёзы, слёзы (Slozy, slozy, Tears, Tears)	2010	Give Me A Sign
Волчица (Volchitsa, She-Wolf)	2010	Give Me A Sign
Я тону (YA tonu, I'm Drowning)	2010	Give Me A Sign
Дай мне знак (Day mne znak, Give Me a Sign)	2010	Give Me A Sign
Танцы под дождём (feat. Quest Pistols) (Tantsy pod dozhdom, Dancing in the Rain)	2010	Give Me A Sign
Безопасный секс (Cover version) (Bezopasnyy seks, Safe Sex)	2010	Give Me A Sign
Для друзей (Dlya druzey, For Friends)	2010	Give Me A Sign
Lera Romantika
Я тону (feat. Nikita Goryuk) (YA tonu, I'm Drowning)	2014	no album
Лети (feat. ScarS) (Leti, Fly)	2014	no album
5sta Family
Небо в огне (Nebo v ogne, Sky is On Fire)	2015	no album
Метко (Metko, Aptly)	2015	no album
Стирая границы (Stiraya granitsy, Erasing the Borders)	2016	no album
Футболка (Futbolka, T-shirt)	2016	no album
Везувий (Vezuviy, Vesuvius)	2017	no album
Многоэтажки (Mnogoetazhki, High-Rises)	2017	no album
KURAGA
Bellyache (Cover version)	2019	—N/a
NYUTA&LERA
Мой мальчик (Moy mal'chik, My Boy)	2020	—N/a

== Music videos ==
Year	Clip	Directed by	Album
Ranetki Girls
2006	Shes Alone	Vladimir Yakimenko	Ranetki
2007	About You	Vladimir Yakimenko	Ranetki
2008	Angels	Rezo Gigineishvili	Ranetki
Quest Pistols
2009	He Is Near	Yuri Bardash	Superklass
LERALERA
2010	She-Wolf	Yuri Bardash	Give Me A Sign
2010	Unpleasant	Yuri Bardash	Give Me A Sign
2010	Safe Sex	Yuri Bardash	Give Me A Sign
5sta Family
2015	Aptly	Stalker Semenovich	no album
2016	T-shirt	Igor Shmelev	no album
2017	High-Rises	Alexey Malakhov	no album

== Filmography ==
Filmography
Year	Title	Roles	Notes
2007	Happy Together	Vocalist of the band Pipettes	2 episodes
2008–2010	Ranetki (TV series)	Lera Novikova	224 episodes
2009	Arthur and the Revenge of Maltazard	Princess Selenia	Russian voiceover
2011	Summer, swim trunks, rock 'n' roll!	As herself	8 episodes
