= Loya (singer) =

Ukrainian singer (born 1988)

Loya Лоя

Background information
- Born: Olga Igorevna Zasulskaya; December 30, 1988 (age 37); Kremenchuk, Ukrainian SSR, Soviet Union
- Genres: pop; house
- Occupations: Singer; songwriter
- Years active: 2006–present
- Member of: 5sta Family

Olga Igorevna Zasulskaya (Russian: Ольга Игоревна Засульская; Ukrainian: Ольга Ігорівна Засульська; born December 30, 1988, Kremenchuk, Ukrainian SSR, USSR), better known under the pseudonym Loya (Russian: Лоя) is a Russian-Ukrainian singer, composer and song writer.

== Biography ==
Zasulskaya was born in Kremenchuk, where she lived in the industrial area on Geroev Brest Street. Her nationality is Ukrainian. Her father, Igor Vladimirovich Zasulsky, is a composer and musician. Likewise, her mother, Irina Vladimirovna Zasulskaya (maiden name Tsybulnik) is a singer and musician.

In the summer of 2002, Zasulskaya moved from Poltava to Moscow. She completed 11th grade at Moscow School No. 1037. She also worked part-time as a courier for a music distribution company. After six months, she quit this job and began trying out for various castings. In 2006, she met Vasily Kosinsky and Valery Efremov and joined the group 5sta Family.

=== 5sta Family ===
In 2010, Zasulskaya wrote the lyrics and music for a new single, "Zachem?", which, according to tophit.ru, took third among the most played songs of 2010. At the same time, the group caught the attention of producer Aleksandr Voytinskiy, who offered to record the soundtrack for Timur Bekmambetov's film "Yolki." A new song, "Love Without Deception," was released in 2010.

At the same time, Zasulskaya, under the guidance of producer Oleg Mironov, began working on solo material. The producer introduced the singer to rapper T-killah, and the song "Come Back" was released in the fall of 2011.

=== Solo career ===
Since working with Oleg Nekrasov, Zasulskaya's look changed. Bows had become an integral part of her image. Loya had acquired a doll-like, baby-like appearance, created by stylist Alexandra Belous.

On June 7, 2016, the song "Hold Me Closer" was released.

On February 3, 2017, a new song, "Different," written by Basil, was released. This song was supposed to be included on Loya's debut solo album, which was expected to be released in April.

=== Return to 5sta Family ===
In December 2017, after the departure of Valeria Kozlova, Zasulskaya returned as the lead singer of 5sta Family. On December 5, 2017, 5sta Family released their single "Snov vmeste" (Again Together). On June 7, 2018, the single "Flyaga Svistit" (Flask Whistles) premiered, and the music video premiered on July 26. The new single "Membranes" premiered on September 28.

== Awards and nominations ==
Year	Award	Song	Nomination	Result
2011	Woman of the year Glamour	-	Singer of the year	Nominated
2011	Award "Breakthrough of the year" Moda Topical	-	Music Project of the Year	Won
2012	Премия RU.TV	«Розы темно-алые»	Best Start	Nominated
2012	20 Best Red Star Songs	«Розы темно-алые»	-	13th Place
