= Bahh Tee =

Russian-Azerbaijani singer (born 1988)

Bahh Tee Бах Ти
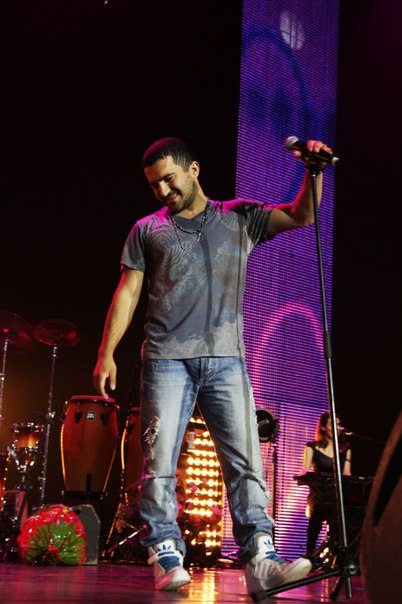

Background information
- Born: Bakhtiyar Mezhdin oglu Aliyev; October 5, 1988 (age 37)
- Occupations: Singer; songwriter; record producer
- Years active: 2005-present

-

Bahh Tee (Russian. Бах Ти), real name Bakhtiyar Mezhdin oglu Aliyev (Russian: Бахтия́р Межди́н оглы́ Али́ев; Azerbaijani: Bəxtiyar Mezdin Oğlu Əliyev; born October 5, 1988, Irkutsk) is a Russian singer.

== Biography ==
Bakhtiyar was born on October 5, 1988, in Irkutsk. He is an Azerbaijani by nationality. His parents are from the city Aghjabadi.

=== With the group "Tee'shina" ===
At the end of 2005, Bakhtiyar and his friend Evgeniy Desert formed the duet "Tee'shina". In January 2006, they recorded their first song, entitled "Odinochka," and then "Bez Vininye Vinovatye," "It's Only the Beginning," and "Za Ruku," which became fairly famous. With this song, the group "Tee'shina" became a finalist at the festivals "Kofemolka 2006" and "Urbania Urbansound'06.". That same year, they took part in the television project "Making Babies" on MTV together with the groups Ranetki and 5sta Family.

=== Solo career ===
At the beginning of 2012, Ls.Den and Bahh Tee announced the creation of a joint project called "Vesye" and on February 3rd released a seven-song mini-album of the same name.

=== Promo singles/Other songs ===
- 2020 — "Люби меня"
- 2020 — "Вытри слёзы, дура"
- 2020 — "До утра"
- 2020 — "Твою мать!"
- 2021 — "Ветер и Берёза"
- 2022 — "Твой последний шанс"
- 2022 — "Утонуть в твоих глазах"
- 2023 — "Снежинки"
- 2024 — "Чудо" (with Jah Khalib)
- 2024 — "Увы" (with HAMMALI)
- 2024 — "Обязательно брошу"
- 2024 — "Несчастный случай" (with Зомб)
- 2024 — "Ты все усложняешь"
- 2024 — "Медленно"
- 2024 — "Как ты там?"
- 2025 — "Дождись" (with Loc-Dog)

On February 23, 2013, a military-themed music video, "Flying Will Die," was released, filmed in Samara.

In December, the music video for "Only Music Is Real" was released, featuring numerous Russian pop stars, including Bahh Tee. The song "Only Music Is Real" became the anthem for the "First Real Music Box Award" on the Russian Music Box TV channel.
