= Ranetki Girls =

Russian pop rock group

- Also known as: Clip SA (2005)
- Origin: Moscow, Russia
- Genres: Pop rock; power pop; teen pop; alternative rock
- Years active: 2005–2013; 2017–present
- Label: Megaliner Records
- Members: Anya Rudneva
- Past members: Anna Baydavletova; Zhenya Ogurtsova; Lena Tretyakova; Lera Kozlova; Natasha Milnichenko; Alina Petrova; Lena Galperina

Ranetki Girls (Russian: Ранетки) is a Russian pop rock group from Moscow, Russia. Formed in 2005, the group has released four studio albums, before breaking up in 2013. The band reunited in 2017, and has released several singles since. The group were winners of the Five Stars and Eurosonic 2008 competition and won two Muz-TV Music Awards in 2009.

== History ==
=== Early years (2005) ===
Ranetki formed in 2005, after songwriter Dmitry Popov and producer Sergey Milnichenko sought out castings for a new youth rock group. The original line-up consisted of vocalist and guitarist Lena Galperina, bassist Alina Petrova, keyboardist Zhenya Ogurtsova and drummer Lera Kozlova, and were originally called "Clip SA", due to the group's tomboy appearance. However, as the songs were written, the material began to become saturated with songs about first love, and they were renamed to the "Ranetki Girls" to the fit the style. They also added two members around this time, guitarist Natasha Milnichenko and Anya Rudneva. The group met Sergei Krylov, who was also involved with the band's creation, taught Kozlova to play drums and they would practice songs by The Beatles and Nazareth. By the end of 2005, Galperina left the group and joined Tuki-Tuki, and Lena Tretyakova replaced Petrova on bass. Kozlova also took over on lead vocals, while maintaining her position on drums.

=== Ranetki (2006–2008) ===
The group signed with Megaliner Records in late 2005. In May 2006, the group performed at the Eurovision competition. They also performed at the Radio Day concert in Moscow that same month. In September 2006, the group competed at the Five Stars festival in Sochi, performing the song, "Venus" by Shocking Blue. Later that month, they opened for Russian punk rock band, Tarakany!. Their debut single, "She's All Alone" was released on November 19, 2006. In December 2006, their self-titled debut studio album was released. It was presented live on December 5, at the B-2 Club. The album was recorded at Milnichenko's home. Two tracks from the album appeared on the Russian TV series, Kadetstvo. The group participated in MTV Russia's musical battle programming on December 13. The album topped the Russian Albums Chart and was certified platinum by NFPF. In January 2007, they performed at the Russian Winter festival at Trafalgar Square in London. In September 2007, Yes! magazine named the group as one of the "Face of the Year - 2007". The band performed at the 2008 Eurosonic festival in January. They were named recipients of the Five Stars and Eurosonic competitions. In March 2008, CTC launched their TV series of the name, which ran until 2014. The song, "About You" was featured on Grand Theft Auto IV. Additionally, the song, "She's All Alone" was included on The Sims 2: Apartment Life. In November 2008, Kozlova departed from the group, following a conflict with Melnichenko. According to Kozlova, she was "asked" to leave the group on November 1, ten minutes before the start of their concert at Luzhniki and was replaced by Anna Baydavletova of Nine Lives. However, she maintained her placement on the show and had no resentment towards anyone in the band. Following her exit from the band, she started her solo career and formed the group Miami. Their concert at State Concert Hall in Luzhniki on November 1, was the eighth best selling concerts of 2008 in Russia. In 2009, Ranetki won the Muz-TV Music Award for Best Album, as well as the single "Angels" for Best Soundtrack.

=== It's Our Time and I Will Never Forget (2009–2010) ===
In April 2009, the group released their second studio album, It's Our Time. The album was presented on April 4, at the Luzhniki Olympic Complex. The album peaked at number one on the Russian Albums Chart and was certified gold by the NFPF. It also spent more than four months in the top 10 on the International Album Sales Chart. On June 23, the band was selected to open for Britney Spears on the Cirus Tour at Moscow on July 21. In November 2009, the group embarked on a headlining tour, beginning in Komi Republic. It's Our Time was ranked at number four by the News Music readers poll in December 2009. The band was also presented with the Artists of the Year award for being the most searched entertainment group in the country by Google Russia.

On May 31, 2010, the group announced that they would be releasing their third studio album, I Will Never Forget in June. The album was officially released on June 15. In support of the album's release, the band released a music video for the song, "Taxes on Love". The group also embarked on a Russian tour in October 2010. The album reached number four on the Russian Albums Chart. In December 2010, they were named Best Band of the Year by the News Music readers poll, as well as their album I Will Never Forget for Best Album.

=== Bring Back the Rock N' Roll and breakup (2011–2013) ===
On October 30, 2010, the group released two singles, "Tears" and "Ice" for their forthcoming fourth studio album. On January 19, 2011, the band announced the title of their fourth studio album, Bring Back the Rock N' Roll and that it would be released on March 1. The album was presented live at the B-2 Club on March 1. In 2011, Rudneva left the group, following a conflict with one of the band's producer. She pursued a solo career and started her own production company called, Ann Rudneva Production. In April 2012, the group made their first live performance after one year at the Milk Moscow club, with support from Pudra. In 2012, each members of the band began solo careers, while the group still remained together. In June 2012, they re-issued the album under a different name titled, Bring Back Ranetok. In 2013, the group officially disbanded.

=== Reunion (2017–present) ===
In 2017, the band returned without Milnichenko and Baydavletova, however not as a music group, but instead created a YouTube channel called Kuraga, where they would talk about their personal lives. Additionally, Kozlova rejoined them for the first time since departing the band in November 2008. In November of that year, Rudneva and Milnichenko revived the group name and reunited as a duo to release the single, "We Lost Time". In March 2018, Baydavletova, Kozlova, Ogurtsova and Tretyakova briefly reunited without Rudneva and Milnichenko at the Zhara Music Awards. In May 2019, Baydavletova, Kozlova Ogurtsova and Tretyakova teased a reunion, before showing that the group were recording new tracks in June. In November, they made a surprise appearance at the International Festival of Creative Youth Generation NEXT 2019, performing a cover of Billie Eilish's "Bellyache". In May 2024, the group re-released their 2006 song "About You" with featured vocals from ТРАВМА.

== Musical style and influences ==
Their musical style is described as pop and pop rock. During the late-2000s, the group's image was described as emo and punk. The Voice Mag commented, "Five teenage girls wore sagging jeans, printed T-shirts, belts with smiley faces and bags with badges. Despite their informal style of clothing, each of the girls eventually found happiness in their family, and not in aggressive music."

== Members ==
=== Current members ===
- Anya Rudneva – rhythm guitar, vocals (2005–2011, 2017, 2020–present)

=== Former members ===
- Anna Baydavletova – drums, lead vocals (2008–2013, 2019)
- Zhenya Ogurtsova – keyboards, vocals (2005–2013, 2019)
- Lena Tretyakova – bass guitar, vocals (2005–2013, 2019)
- Lera Kozlova – drums, lead vocals (2005–2008, 2019)
- Natasha Milnichenko – lead guitar, backing vocals (2005–2013, 2017)
- Alina Petrova – bass guitar (2005)
- Lena Galperina – vocals (2005)

== Discography ==
=== Studio albums ===
List of studio albums, with chart positions and certifications
Title	Album details	Peak chart positions	Certifications
Title	Album details	RUS	Certifications
Ranetki	Released: December 2006; Label: Megaliner; Format: CD, digital download	1	NFPF: Platinum
It's Our Time	Released: April 2009; Label: Megaliner; Format: CD, digital download	1	NFPF: Gold
I Will Never Forget	Released: June 15, 2010; Label: Megaliner; Format: CD, digital download	4	
Bring Back the Rock N' Roll	Released: March 1, 2011; Label: Megaliner; Format: CD, digital download	—	
"—" denotes releases that did not chart.

=== Compilation albums ===
List of compilation albums with selected details
Title	Album details
Ranetki / Ranetki Live / It's Our Time	Released: 2009; Label: Megaliner; Format: CD
Ranetki & Balabama	Released: September 2009; Label: Megaliner; Format: CD
Ranetki	Released: 2010; Label: Megaliner; Format: CD

=== Live albums ===
List of live albums, with chart positions
Title	Album details	Peak chart positions
Title	Album details	RUS
Live: The Concert Tour in Russia	Released: 2009; Label: Megaliner; Format: CD	1

=== Video albums ===
List of video albums with selected details
Title	EP details
Ranetki: Luzhniki	Released: 2009; Label: Megaliner; Format: DVD

=== Singles ===
List of singles as lead artist, with selected chart positions, showing year released and album name
Title	Year	Peak chart positions			Album
Title	Year	RUS	CIS	UKR	Album
"She's All Alone"	2006	119	—	49	Ranetki
"We Are Ranetki"	2006	—	—	119	Ranetki
"Winter"	2007	—	194	125	Ranetki
"It's Spring in Moscow"	2007	129	73	17	Ranetki
"Angels" (Original or Remix with DJ Dima Young & DJ Borisoff)	2008	—	199	—	Ranetki
"I Will Never Forget"	2009	—	143	—	I Will Never Forget
"Tears / Ice"	2010	—	—	—	Bring Back the Rock N' Roll
"We Lost Time"	2017	—	—	—	Non-album singles
"History From 2005"	2018	—	—	—	Non-album singles
"Sunny"	2019	—	—	—	Non-album singles
"Let It Rain"	2020	—	—	—	Non-album singles
"Everything Was Different Before"	2021	—	—	—	Non-album singles
"9th Grade"	2021	—	—	—	Non-album singles
"About You (2024 Version)" (with ТРАВМА)	2024	—	—	—	Non-album singles
"—" denotes releases that did not chart.

== Awards and nominations ==
=== Muz-TV Music Awards ===
Year	Category	Work	Result	Ref.
2009	Best Album	Ranetki	Won	
2009	Best Soundtrack	"Angels"	Won	

=== Accolades ===
Publication	Accolade	Work	Year	Rank	Ref.
News Music	Best Pop Album	It's Our Time	2009	4	
News Music	Best Album	I Will Never Forget	2010	1	
News Music	Best Group	Ranetki	2010	1	
News Music	Best Album	Bring Back the Rock N' Roll	2011	6	
News Music	Best Group	Ranetki	2011	7	
News Music	Best Group	Ranetki	2012	38	
