= Big Ain't Bad =

- Directed by: Ray Culpepper
- Written by: Brian D. Poe (aka Drayton Jamison)
- Produced by: Brian D. Poe; Eric Croone; Jade Jenise Dixon; Kirby Roy Freeman; Marvin Arrington Jr. Ray Culpepper
- Starring: Sean Blakemore; Jade Jenise Dixon; Reginald Ballard; Tico Wells; Troy Medley
- Cinematography: Matthew MacCarthy
- Edited by: Jim Finn; Matt Woo; Richard Haylock
- Music by: Brian D. Poe; Marvin Arrington Jr.
- Distributed by: Urban Works Entertainment
- Release dates: June 8, 2002 (Atlanta Film and Video Festival); April 1, 2005 (United States)
- Running time: 108 minutes
- Country: United States
- Language: English
- Box office: $12,288 (USA)

Big Ain't Bad is a romantic comedy film, directed by Ray Culpepper and written by Brian Poe (aka Drayton Jamison). It stars Sean Blakemore (2016 Daytime Emmy Winner as Outstanding Actor in a Supporting role on ABC-TV's General Hospital), Jade Jenise Dixon, Reginald Ballard, Tico Wells, and Troy Medley. The film won the Audience Choice Award at the 2003 Hollywood Black Film Festival in Los Angeles, California. It was the Kick Off Film to the Fox Theater's 75th Anniversary Summer Film Series in Atlanta in 2004. It played in limited release in movie theaters, and was released to DVD (First Look) in 2005.

== Plot ==
Big Ain't Bad is a romantic comedy that redefines the measure of love. Ric (Blakemore) and Natalie (Dixon) are a happy young couple headed towards marriage after a brief courtship. However, when Natalie makes an early return home from a business trip and finds her trusted mate in the company of last night's entertainment, the relationship abruptly ends leaving them to travel separate roads to self-discovery.

== Cast ==
- Jade Jenise Dixon as Natalie Wilkins
- Sean Blakemore as Ric Jackson
- Reginald Ballard as Butch Wilkins
- Tico Wells as Kirkland Ellis III
- Troy Medley as Dino "Mobe" Wilkins
- Cory Tyler as Pierre
- Hattie Lemon as Marilyn
- Jemmerio Is Jemmerio as Fats
- Kenny Leon as Mayor Thomas Jordan
- Montanna Taylor as Denver
- Phyllis Yvonne Stickney as Lauren Jordan
- Sahr Ngaujah as Clay
- Syr Law as Marci
- Tracie Wright as Gina
- Tracy Johnson as Tiny
- Therese Dray-Jones as Sabrina
- Angel Glaspie as Cashier
- Bernard Holyfield as Quincy
- Janora McDuffie as Keli
- Aimee Palance as Mia
- Xavier Rivers as Curator
- Malcolm Spears as Spencer
- Frank Ski as Lead MC
- Rashan Ali as Rae Vaughn
- Jason Carter as MC
- Jace C. Gatewood as Butch Wilkins, Sr.
- Isaiah Thomas as Young Dino Wilkins
- Cameron Witherspoon as Young Natalie Wilkins
- Ryann Poe as Child in Rain Scene
- Lil Jon as himself
