= Vmeste mie =

Single by 5sta Family
- Language: Russian
- English title: Together we are
- Released: April 12, 2012
- Genre: Dance pop
- Length: 3:36

"Vmestye mie" (Russian: «Вместе мы»), translated as "Together we are" is a song by Russian music group 5sta Family, written by Russian musicians Anastasia Krivenko, Maxim Kontarev and Valery Efremov.

The song received positive reviews from critics and received a nomination at the RU.TV 2013 awards in the category "Лучшая песня." By the end of the year, the song became one of the most frequently played on radio stations in Russia and the CIS countries and received a TopHit award in the category "Most Played Single, Mixed Vocals".

== Critic reactions ==
Professional ratings
Review scores
Source	Rating
MuseCube.org	4/5 stars
Афиша	(neutral)
Красная звезда	(5th place)

== Awards and nominations ==
Year	Award	Nominated work	Category	Results
2012	Golden Gramophone	"Вместе мы"	Song	Won
2013	TopHit Awards	"Вместе мы"	Most played single, mixed vocals	Won
2013	Премия RU.TV	"Вместе мы"	Best song	Nominated

== List of compositions ==
Remixes</templatestyles>

No.	Title	Length
1.	"Вместе мы (DJ Solovey remix)" (5ivesta family)	5:20
2.	"Вместе Мы (DJ Melnikoff Remix)" (5ivesta family)	4:00
3.	"Вместе мы (Dj Boor Remix)" (5ivesta family)	3:28
4.	"Вместе Мы (DJ Nejtrino & DJ Stranger Remix)" (5ivesta family)	4:40
5.	"Вместе мы (Dj XM remix)"	4:20
6.	"Вместе Мы (DJ Geny Tur ft. DJ Мaksimoff Remix)" (5ivesta family)	2:38
7.	"Вместе мы (Dj Amor Remix)" (5ivesta family)	4:15
