= Lethalz =

- Directed by: Rumena Dinevska
- Written by: Kamala Lane
- Produced by: Anastasia Reinhard; Sabrina Percario
- Starring: Sean Blakemore; Kofi Boakye; DaNae West; Samantha Grace; Keturah Hamilton; Ikumi Yoshimatsu
- Cinematography: Alexander Haessner
- Production company: Phillmonaco Productions
- Release date: 2019
- Running time: 10 min.
- Country: United States
- Language: English
- Budget: $15 000

Lethalz is a 2019 American short crime film directed by Rumena Dinevska.

His the premiere demonstration took place February 2, 2019 at the Indie Night Film Festival.

== Plot ==
A women's gang of fighters for justice gets together to destroy a brutal crime syndicate. But lies, intrigues, as well as their dark past put them at risk of death.

== Cast ==
- Sean Blakemore as David Claude
- Kofi Boakye as Rocky
- Samantha Grace as Lindsay Owen
- Keturah Hamilton as Samantha
- Raymond Karago as Bartender
- Lexy Lane as Young Nicole
- Leon Ross as Bash
- Caroline Sweet as Dr. Grand
- Lena Tretyakova as Young Lindsay
- DaNae West as Sarah the Kid
- Ikumi Yoshimatsu as Lucy Suzuki

== Awards and nominations ==
=== Awards ===
Festigious International Film Festival 2019

- Inspiring Woman in a Film (Ally Teixeira)

NYC Indie Film Awards 2019

- Gold Awards for Best Short Film

=== Nominations ===
Hollywood International Moving Pictures Film Festival 2019

- Best Drama Short
- Best Drama Short

LA Film Festival 2019

- Best Drama
- Best Produced Screenplay
