= Bob Glouberman =

American actor

- Born: May 3, 1968 (age 58); New York City, U.S.
- Occupation: Actor
- Years active: 1993–present

Bob Glouberman (born May 3, 1968) is an American actor who has appeared in over 100 television shows, mainly sitcoms.

== Biography ==
Glouberman was born in Brooklyn, New York. He has had recurring roles on the television shows Without a Trace, The Closer (the CBS Tom Selleck sitcom), Spin City, Lateline, and Mad About You, as well as recurring voiceover roles on the cartoons Handy Manny, Digimon Tamers, Rave Master, and Men in Black: The Series. He has also appeared on Desperate Housewives, The Closer (the Kyra Sedgewick drama), Ugly Betty, Close to Home, Curb Your Enthusiasm, Arrested Development, iCarly, Malcolm in the Middle, The West Wing, and ER. His unique look and demeanor have led him to play on several occasions the role of the 'nightmare blind date' to many of Hollywood's preeminent leading ladies, including Carmen Electra in Fat Actress, Calista Flockhart in Ally McBeal, and Jenny McCarthy in the film Dirty Love. He is also the co-founder of the Los Angeles Race Fantastique (or, LARF for short). LARF is an elaborate scavenger hunt which runs public races, private races, and daily races for tourists in Cozumel, Mexico, St Thomas Virgin Islands and Los Angeles. Glouberman is a graduate of Stanford and The UCLA School of Law.

== Filmography ==
=== Anime dubbing ===
- Digimon Tamers - Shibumi
- Rave Master - Mikan, Ruby

=== Film ===
- The Artist - Director #3
- Digimon: The Movie - Willis
- Digimon Adventure 02: Digimon Hurricane Touchdown!! / Transcendent Evolution! The Golden Digimentals (standalone dub) - Willis
- The Barefoot Executive - Executive
- Red Riding Hood - Scoutmaster
- Win a Date With Tad Hamilton! - Rosalee's Limo Driver
- Dirty Love - Mylo
- Deep Impact - uncredited
- Napoleon (1995) (voice) - Lone Lorikeet/Wombat/Wallaby#2/Desert Mice
- My Dinner with Andre the Giant - lead

=== Television ===
- American Woman - Mr. Knave (1 episode, 2018)
- New Girl - Rabbi
- Glee - Mitzvah University president
- 2 Broke Girls - Garry
- Suburgatory - Lansky
- Getting On - Doctor
- The Office - Mr. Gradenko
- Arrested Development - David the Aide
- General Hospital - Mr. Jenkins
- The Ben Show - Attorney
- Switched at Birth - Mr. Feldman
- Criminal Minds - Attorney
- Zeke and Luther - Attorney
- Classic Concentration - Himself/contestant (1 episode)
- Flying Blind - Heel (1 episode)
- Monty - Rappaport (1 episode)
- The Wayans Bros. - Carjacker (1 episode)
- Family Matters - Bellhop (1 episode)
- Living Single - Technician (1 episode)
- The Barefoot Executive - Executive
- Ellen - Book Club Pundit
- Murphy Brown - Owen Tyler (1 episode)
- Life's Work - Star Trek Conventioneer (1 episode)
- Caroline in the City - Dr. Dorfman (1 episode)
- ER - Jeff (1 episode)
- The Closer - Brother Thomas (2 episodes)
- LateLine - Prompter Techie (2 episodes)
- 3rd Rock from the Sun - Neighbor (1 episode)
- Conrad Bloom - Doctor (1 episode)
- Ally McBeal - Wally Pike (1 episode)
- Mad About You - Alan Kaufman (2 episodes)
- Providence - Katz (1 episode)
- Grown Ups - Mr. Barris (1 episode)
- Battery Park - District Attorney (1 episode)
- L.A. 7 - Fast Food Customer #2 (1 episode)
- Manhattan, AZ - Dr. Keeler (1 episode)
- Spin City - Reporter #2 (5 episodes)
- The West Wing - Terry Beckwith (1 episode)
- The Division - Drew (1 episode)
- One on One - Howard McIntyre (1 episode)
- Russian Roulette - Contestant (1 episode)
- My Wife and Kids - Photographer (1 episode)
- Strong Medicine - Bug Scientist (1 episode)
- Crossing Jordan - Mr. Gottenblatt (1 episode)
- Fat Actress - Carmen's Friend (1 episode)
- Arrested Development - Doctor (2 episodes)
- Malcolm in the Middle - Gerry (1 episode)
- The L Word - Older Man (1 episode)
- Inconceivable - Mr. Jacoby (2 episodes)
- Without a Trace - Polygraph Examiner (2 episodes)
- Curb Your Enthusiasm - Matt (1 episode)
- Handy Manny - Sherman (10 episodes)
- Crumbs - Lawyer (1 episode)
- Close to Home - Sanders Falcone (1 episode)
- Ugly Betty - Doctor (1 episode)
- Desperate Housewives - Mohel (1 episode)
- Jonas - Mr. Spencer (1 episode)
- Who's Still Standing? - Himself (contestant) (1 episode)
- Common Law - David Kurn (1 episode)

=== Video games ===
- Hitman: Blood Money
- Skylanders: SuperChargers
- Ultimate Spider-Man - Rhino
- X-Men: Destiny - Caliban
