= Tico Wells =

American actor

Tico Wells is an American actor, known for his role as Choir Boy in the 1991 film The Five Heartbeats. He has also appeared on The Cosby Show, 227, Hallmark movies and Beverly Hills, 90210. He was Tim in the movie The Wish List, and played Dexter Williams, the younger brother of Denzel Washington's character Demetrius Williams, in Mississippi Masala. He starred as Kirkland J. Ellis, III, in the independent film Big Ain't Bad, a romantic drama that won Auds honors at the Hollywood Black Film Festival. He made a cameo in the Martin Lawrence show, Martin as "Sweet Reggie."

== Filmography ==
=== Film ===
Year	Title	Role
1985	The Passing	Young Rose WWII
1988	Heart of Midnight	Henry
1989	The Dream Team	Station Attendant
1989	Misplaced	Clayton
1990	The Return of Superfly	Willy Green
1991	The Five Heartbeats	Anthony "Choir Boy" Stone
1991	Mississippi Masala	Dexter Williams
1992	Universal Soldier	Garth
1992	Trespass	Davis
1994	Drop Squad	Fat Money
1997	The Relic	Bailey
1998	Legend of the Mummy	Young Corbeck
2001	Final Payback	Dealer
2001	All About You	Walter
2002	Big Ain't Bad	Kirkland J. Ellis III
2007	Love & Other Four Letter Words	Slaughter
2007	Sister's Keeper	Root
2011	Forgiveness	Pastor Thomas McKenzie

=== Television ===
Year	Title	Role	Notes
1984	Summer	Desmond Witherspoon III	TV movie
1987-1988	The Cosby Show	Dr. Jerry Taylor	Two Episodes
1989	227	Mike	Season 4, No, My Darling Daughter
1990	Beverly Hills, 90210	James Townsend	Season 1, One on One
1990	China Beach	Bobby Seale	Season 4, The Call
1992	Going to Extremes		Season 1, Pilot Episode
1993	The Ernest Green Story	Jefferson Thomas	TV movie, Disney
1995	Martin	Reggie	Season 3, Express Yourself
1995	Tyson	Charles Neal	TV movie, HBO
1996	Law & Order	1st Uniformed Officer	Season 6, Deceit
1995	Happily Ever After: Fairy Tales for Every Child	Friend #2	Season 1, Rapunzel
1996	Waynehead	Marvin/ Kid	13 episodes
1997	Happily Ever After: Fairy Tales for Every Child	Duke of Earl/ Exterminator	Season 5, Pied Piper
1997	JAG	PO Elwood Douglas	Season 3, Above and Beyond
1997	The Drew Carey Show	Room Service Guy	Season 3, Vacation
1998	Boy Meets World	D.J.	Season 5, The Eskimo
2001	One Special Moment	James Watson	TV movie, BET
2002	24	Karris	Season 1, 11:00 p.m.- 12:00 a.m.
2003	Monster Makers	Desk Sergeant	TV movie
2004	ER	Dr. Jennings	Season 10, Drive
2005	All of Us	Bill Jinkins	Season 3, Divorce Means Never Having To Say I'm Sorry
2006	Wild Hearts	Jake	TV movie, Hallmark Channel
2009	Family Guy	Bobby Brown	Season 8, Brian's Got a Brand New Bag
2010	The Wish List	Tim	TV movie, Hallmark Channel
2012	Bones	Dennis Timmons	Season 7, The Family in the Feud
