= Zachem? =

Single by 5sta Family
- Language: Russian
- English title: For what?
- Released: February 3, 2010
- Genre: Pop; R&B
- Length: 3:33
- Label: Music People

Zachem? (Russian: «Зачем?») is a song, written and released by the group "5sta family," Loey, V. Efremov and V. Kossinsky.

== Charts ==
The single took first place on the Russian radio chart, staying at the top spot for 8 weeks. The song debuted on the Russian digital singles chart at number one on June 18, 2010. In the second week, the single also reached number 1. The song topped the charts for the following 6 weeks. In its ninth week on the chart, the song dropped to number 2, being replaced by the song "Alors On Danse" by singer Stromae. The song stayed at the number 2 spot in weeks 10, 11 and 12. In week 13, the song dropped to number 3 on the chart. In week 14 the song rose again to number 2, in week 15 the song dropped to number 6.
