= Sean Blakemore =

American actor

- Born: August 10, 1967 (age 58); St. Louis, Missouri, U.S.
- Occupation: Actor
- Years active: 1996–present
- Spouse: Nadyia Jones (m. 2010)
- Children: 1

Sean Blakemore (born August 10, 1967) is an American actor who is portraying Shawn Butler on the ABC daytime drama General Hospital, a role he began playing on January 21, 2011 on a recurring basis. Blakemore was nominated for a Daytime Emmy Award for Outstanding Supporting Actor in a Drama Series for his role on General Hospital in 2012 and won the award in 2016. On April 6, 2011, he signed a contract with ABC to continue his role full-time.

== Early life ==
Blakemore was born on August 10, 1967, the fifth of seven children (five girls and two boys) from a single parent household, in St. Louis, Missouri. He has one brother, Ronnell, and five sisters, Kim, Sharon, Yvonne, Yvette, and Rechelle.

He attended Hazelwood East High School in his hometown of St. Louis. Blakemore was a successful model, then moved to Los Angeles on July 19, 1998, to become an actor.

== Career ==
Blakemore has appeared on episodes on such series as ER, Monk, The Shield, Cold Case, NCIS and Bones. He won Auds honors at the Hollywood Black Film Festival for his portrayal of Ric Jackson in the independent romantic drama Big Ain't Bad.

Blakemore also appeared in the 2002 film Dahmer, and TV movies Motives 2: Retribution, and Blackout.

In 2011, Blakemore joined the cast of General Hospital in the role of Shawn Butler. In 2015, he exited the role; he later reprised the role for guest appearances in November 2015 and April 2016. Blakemore returned to the role in April 2021.

== Personal life ==
Blakemore married Nadyia Jones on June 19, 2010. In late March 2013, it was announced that the couple were having their first baby. In May 2013, the Blakemores had a daughter.

== Filmography ==
=== Film ===
Year	Title	Role	Notes
1996	Soul of the Game	Grace's husband	TV movie
2000	The Playaz Court	Officer Jones	
2000	Playing with Fire	Eric Konadu	TV movie
2001	Can't Let Go	David	Short
2002	Big Ain't Bad	Ric	
2002	Dahmer	Corliss	
2003	Keepin' It Real	Richard	
2003	Momentum	Floor Cop #2	TV movie
2004	Woman Thou Art Loosed	Pervis	
2004	Motives	Brandon	Video
2006	Restraining Order	Dontae McNeil	
2006	Hot Tamale	Dewayne Longfellow	
2007	Motives 2	Brandon Collier	Video
2007	Young Cesar	-	
2007	Blackout	James	
2008	Columbus Day	Officer Walters	
2008	The Porter	Arthur Dodd	Short
2008	Belly 2: Millionaire Boyz Club	Police Photographer	Video
2008	The Inspiration of Barack	Derek	Short
2010	Butterfly Rising	Jacob	
2011	Church Girl	Jacob	
2013	Star Trek Into Darkness	Klingon	
2014	The Fright Night Files	Lockwood Masters	TV movie
2015	Fear Files	Lockwood Masters	TV movie
2016	Pet	Detective Meara	
2016	Cursed Angel	John Washington	TV movie
2016	Diva Diaries	Derrick	
2018	Spinning Man	Killian	
2018	One Crazy Christmas	Glen	
2019	Lethalz	David Claude	Short
2019	Ad Astra	Willie Levant	
2020	Close Up	Sheriff Griff	TV movie

=== Television ===
Year	Title	Role	Notes
2002	The District	Achmed Ali	Episode: "Free-Fire Zone"
2003	General Hospital	Chase Wright	Episode: "Episode #1.10396" & "Episode #1.10400"
2004	Monk	Spyder Cell Guard	Episode: "Mr. Monk Goes to Jail"
2004	The Young and the Restless	Ben	Regular Cast
2005	Cold Case	Clyde (63)	Episode: "Strange Fruit"
2005	The Shield	John Sullivan	Episode: "Hurt"
2005	Into the West	Ben Franklin	Episode: "Wheel to the Stars"
2005	The O.C.	Trauma Doctor	Episode: "The Aftermath"
2006	The Unit	African Soldier	Episode: "Stress"
2006	Invasion	Coast Guard Lt.	Episode: "Re-Evolution"
2006	CSI: NY	Nick Davis	Episode: "Raising Shane"
2007	ER	Mario	Episode: "From Here to Paternity"
2007	K-Ville	Ken	Episode: "AKA"
2008–09	Bones	Grayson Barasa	Recurring cast: season 4
2008–09	Days of Our Lives	Peter/Barney Bateman	Regular Cast
2009	Lie to Me	FBI Agent Irving	Episode: "Tractor Man"
2010	Stargate Universe	Reginald Greer	Episode: "Lost" & "Pain"
2011	NCIS	Navy Chief Petty Officer Jerome Carr	Episode: "Recruited"
2011–22	General Hospital	Shawn Butler	Regular Cast
2014	The Rickey Smiley Show	Charles	Episode: "Go Home, Sister Bernice"
2015–16	CSI: Cyber	Director Marcus Silver	Recurring cast: Season 2
2016	Bosch	Captain John Felton	Recurring cast: season 2
2016	Devious Maids	Reverend James Hamilton	Recurring cast: Season 4
2016	Hawaii Five-0	Supervisor Keith Harlan	Episode: "Ka makuahine a me ke keikikane"
2017	American Crime	Reggie Pollard	Recurring cast: season 3
2017–18	The Quad	Eugene Hardwick	Main cast, 17 episodes
2018	Saints & Sinners	Pastor Daniel Byrd	Episode: "Buried Secrets"
2018	Scorpion	Captain Dan Drake	Episode: "Kenny and the Jet"
2018	13 Reasons Why	Mr. Cole	Episode: "The Drunk Slut" & "The Second Polaroid"
2018	American Horror Story: Apocalypse	Cooperative Agent	Episode: "The End"
2018–20	Greenleaf	Phillip "Phil" DeMars	Guest: season 3, recurring cast: season 4-5
2019	Lethal Weapon	Barrett	Episode: "Dial M for Murtaugh"
2019	The Bay	Tony Foster	Episode: "The Getaway"
2020	MacGyver	Vice President Danny Linson	Episode: "Loyalty + Family + Rogue + Hellfire"
2020	Two Degrees	Sean	Episode: "DATING MYself"
2022–23	All Rise	André Armstrong	Recurring cast: season 3
2023	Cruel Summer	Sheriff Jack Myer	Main cast: season 2
2024	S.W.A.T.	Elijah Leonard	Episode: "SNAFU"

== Awards and nominations ==
List of acting awards and nominations
Year	Award	Category	Title	Result	Ref.
2012	Daytime Emmy Award	Outstanding Supporting Actor in a Drama Series	General Hospital	Nominated	
2016	Daytime Emmy Award	Outstanding Supporting Actor in a Drama Series	General Hospital	Won	
