= Reginald Ballard =

American actor (born 1965)

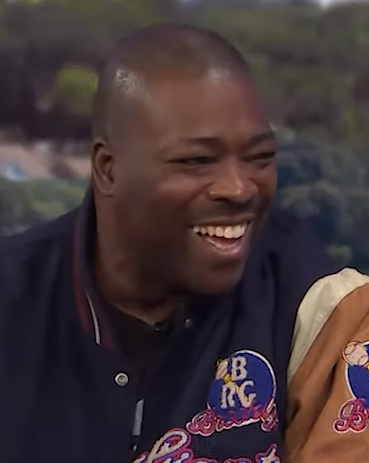
- Ballard in 2020
- Born: October 13, 1965 (age 61); Galveston, Texas, U.S.
- Occupations: Actor, comedian
- Years active: 1989–present
- Children: 2

Reginald Ballard (born October 13, 1965) is an American character actor and comedian from Galveston, Texas, who is best known for his recurring roles as Bruhman in the sitcom Martin and W.B. on The Bernie Mac Show, which both aired on Fox. After graduation from Ball High School, where he was an all district linebacker, Ballard earned a full football scholarship to Southern Methodist University, where he was also a theatre major. Just before his senior year, Ballard transferred to the University of Missouri, where he continued to play football, while continuing to act, appearing in a university production of A Soldier's Story in the role of C.J. Memphis.

== Career ==
Spurning overtures from professional football, Ballard headed to Hollywood to pursue his acting career. He has appeared in many different television shows, such as Veronica Mars (the episode "Return of the Kane"), The Parkers, Sister, Sister, Just Jordan, the short-lived show, Crumbs, and Raven's Home. He co-starred in the independent film Big Ain't Bad as Butch. Currently, Ballard is performing stand-up comedy. He is also a former all-district linebacker for Ball High School. He was a speedy linebacker for the Tors, helping Ball High to a 7–3 record his senior season in 1983. He also helped lead the best defense in District 24-5A that year, a defense that allowed only 60.9 yards per game. After playing football at SMU Mustangs for his first three college years, Ballard transferred to Missouri for his senior year after the SMU football program was hit for NCAA violations. He said the acting bug bit him after taking a theater class in college, "getting lost in a scene", and listening to the audience applaud. He was also featured in Big Sean’s music video for "Play No Games" as his own character "Bruh Man" mouthing Ty Dolla $ign's part in the song. He will lend to voice a Security from the upcoming streaming service at Monsters at Work on Disney+.

== Personal life ==
Ballard is married with two children, and the family resides in Pasadena, California.

== Filmography ==
=== Film ===
Year	Title	Role	Notes
1992	Class Act	Fruity	
1993	Menace II Society	Clyde	
1994	Jimmy Hollywood	Man on the street	
1995	Panther	Brother at meeting	
1998	Thick as Thieves	Sugar Bear	
2002	Big Ain't Bad	Butch Wilkins	
2005	Ganked	Dashan	Video
2008	Redrum	Butch Bailey	
2009	The Mail Man	Bouncer	
2011	King of the Underground	Tito	
2011	Horrible Bosses	Kurt's co-worker	
2012	Boosters	Phil	
2014	Samuel Adams	Son of Liberty #2	TV movie
2014	Kony Montana	-	
2019	The Workout Room	Big Comedy	

=== Television ===
Year	Title	Role	Notes
1990	The Trials of Rosie O'Neill	Bailiff	Episode: "So Long Patrick"
1991	True Colors	Tyrell	Recurring cast: season 2
1992	CBS Schoolbreak Special	Thomas Dulcer	Episode: "Words Up!"
1993	A Different World	Guy #2	Episode: "College Kid"
1993-95	Martin	Brother Man	Recurring cast: season 2-4
1994	Sister, Sister	Bouncer	Episode: "The Concert"
1995	Def Comedy Jam	Himself	Episode: "Episode #5.9"
1995	Courthouse	Roland	Episode: "Order on the Court"
1996	The Show	Big Chewy	Recurring cast
1997	Built to Last	Walter	Episode: "The Apple Doesn't Fall Far From..."
1998-99	Caroline in the City	Reg Preston	Recurring cast: season 4
1999	Malcolm & Eddie	Malik Hayden	Episode: "The Wrongest Yard"
2001-06	The Bernie Mac Show	W.B.	Recurring cast
2002-03	The Parkers	Rushion	Recurring cast: season 4, guest: season 5
2003	ER	-	Episode: "Finders Keepers"
2004	Las Vegas	Coleman Riggs	Episode: "Blood and Sand"
2004	NCIS	Antwane Mann	Episode: "The Truth Is Out There"
2004	Veronica Mars	Homeless man	Episode: "Return of the Kane"
2006	All of Us	-	Episode: "Love Do Cost a Thing"
2006	Crumbs	Elvis	Main cast
2008	Just Jordan	Chuck	Episode: "Lord of the Pies"
2010	Bones	Rocky DeKnight	Episode: "The Beginning in the End"
2010	Weeds	Quenton	Episode: "Boomerang"
2011	Rizzoli & Isles	Officer Germaine Walker	Episode: "Can I Get a Witness?"
2012	A.N.T Farm	Security guard	Episode: "chANTs of a lifetime"
2014	According to Him + Her	Reenactment	TV series
2017	In the Cut	Big Lou	Episode: "Petty Things"
2017	Raven's Home	Bouncer	Episode: "Adventures in Mommy-Sitting"
2019	Goalz	Uncle Mike	TV mini series
2020	Family Reunion	Squee	Episode: "Remember Our Parents' Wedding?"
