= Patricia Welch =

American singer and actress (born 1954)

- Born: September 20, 1954 (age 71); Steubenville, Ohio, USA
- Education: West Virginia University
- Occupations: Singer, actress

Patricia Welch (born September 20, 1954) is an American singer and actress.

== Biography ==
Welch was born as Patricia Ann Carpico in Steubenville, Ohio and grew up in the small town of Colliers, West Virginia. Welch attended West Virginia University in Morgantown, West Virginia where she majored in music and drama. In 1972 her vocal training was with American classical soprano opera singer Frances Yeend who was internationally known and appeared regularly with the New York City Opera and the Metropolitan Opera.

== Career ==
=== Theatre ===
In 1980, Welch was cast as Tuptim in the national touring company of The King and I musical. She went on to perform in the musical's 1985 revival at the Broadway Theatre in New York City. The production was directed by Mitch Leigh and was nominated for two Tony Awards. The show ran for 191 performances and Brynner received a Tony Special Award honoring his 4,525 performances in The King and I. Welch was the last Tuptim to perform on Broadway with Yul Brynner prior to his death on October 10, 1985.

=== Singing ===
Welch performed at many concerts and events as a featured soloist with various orchestras across the United States, including The LA Pops Orchestra, The Orange County Symphony, The Pacific Palisades Orchestra, The San Juan Capistrano Symphony, and The Jonathan Pops Orchestra.

Welch recorded the singing voice in two episodes of HBO's animated Happily Ever After: Fairy Tales for Every Child series in 2000: for the character Vanna in season 3, episode 35, "Rip Van Winkle" (whose featured voice was Calista Flockhart), and season 3, episode 32, "Henny Penny" (whose featured voice was Sharon Stone). She recorded the singing voice for the character Holly Lovell, which was performed by the actress Lindsey Haun, as well as the singing voice for Angela, which was performed by actress Barbara Mamabolo, in Brave New Girl, a 2004 TV movie adapted for television from the novel A Mother's Gift by Britney and Lynne Spears.

Welch went on to tour as a featured soloist with Robert Goulet in his show The Man and His Music in 2004. She also recorded a duet with Robert Goulet for a 2007 PBS special. In 2005 and 2006 Welch was a guest soloist in The Wayne Newton Show.

== Personal life ==
Welch lives with her husband A. P. DuBarry, an author, in La Quinta, California.

== Discography ==
- Stream of Love (1990)
- If We Hold On Together (1991)
- Broadway's Best by Patricia (1995)
