= Crumbs (TV series) =

2006 American television sitcom

- Genre: Sitcom
- Created by: Marco Pennette
- Directed by: Ted Wass
- Starring: Fred Savage; Eddie McClintock; Maggie Lawson; Reginald Ballard; William Devane; Jane Curtin
- Composer: Adam Cohen
- Country of origin: United States
- Original language: English
- No. of seasons: 1
- No. of episodes: 13 (8 unaired)

Production
- Executive producers: Marco Pennette; Mike Tollin; Brian Robbins; Joe Davola; Ted Wass
- Producers: Shari Tavey; Joel Stein; Fred Savage; Shelley Zimmerman; Jason Fisher
- Camera setup: Multi-camera
- Running time: 22 minutes
- Production companies: Marco Pennette Productions; Tollin/Robbins Productions; Touchstone Television

Original release
- Network: ABC
- Release: January 12 – February 7, 2006

Crumbs is an American television sitcom starring Fred Savage that ran on ABC from January 12, 2006 to February 7, 2006. It also starred Eddie McClintock, Maggie Lawson, Reginald Ballard, William Devane and Jane Curtin. The show's slogan is "The normal American family turned upside down." The series was officially cancelled on May 13, 2006.

== Premise ==
Savage plays a gay screenwriter who leaves Hollywood to return home to take care of his mother (Jane Curtin), who had recently been released from a mental institution after trying to run over her husband (William Devane) after he left her for a younger woman, who turns out to be pregnant. Much of the show takes place at the family's restaurant.

== Cast ==
=== Main ===
- Fred Savage as Mitch Crumb
- Eddie McClintock as Jody Crumb
- Maggie Lawson as Andrea Malone
- Reginald Ballard as Elvis
- William Devane as Billy Crumb
- Jane Curtin as Suzanne Crumb

=== Guest stars ===
- Rachel Boston as Alison
- Lucy DeVito as Bookstore Cashier
- Illeana Douglas as Shelley
- Teri Garr as Lorraine Bergman
- Bob Glouberman as Lawyer
- Elliott Gould as Frank Bergman
- Valerie Mahaffey as Carolyn Pierce
- Martin Mull as Tom
- Danielle Nicolet as Danielle
- Rhea Perlman as Camille Spadaro
- Kevin Rahm as Roger
- Rider Strong as Dennis

== Episodes ==
Only the first five episodes were broadcast on ABC during the show's original run. The remaining episodes aired in other markets internationally.

No.	Title	Directed by	Written by	Original release date	Prod. code	U.S. viewers (millions)
1	"Pilot"	Ted Wass	Marco Pennette	January 12, 2006	101	11.81
Mitch Crumb comes to his hometown to deal with his mother, who has just been released from a psychiatric facility. She has not yet learned that her ex-husband is about to have a baby with another woman.
2	"Whatever Happened to Baby Bodashka?"	Ted Wass	David Walpert	January 19, 2006	102	11.37
Suzanne decides to adopt a baby girl from Ukraine after learning that Billy and the new woman are having a girl. Meanwhile, Jody gets Mitch a job as manager of the restaurant and must confront an employee who is stealing.
3	"Friends in High Places"	Ted Wass	Marco Pennette	January 26, 2006	103	10.73
Mitch worries about Suzanne's avoiding friends that she shared with her former husband. He then advises her to join a divorce group to sort out her problems. She instead joins a group for recovering drug addicts. Meanwhile, Billy seeks reconciliation with Jody.
4	"Jody Crumb, Superstar"	Ted Wass	Regina Stewart	February 2, 2006	104	9.13
Billy takes control of the family restaurant, due to his financial problems. Mitch and Jody compete for his approval. Suzanne begins to shoplift to seek attention from her sons.
5	"Six Feet Blunder"	Ted Wass	Hayes Jackson	February 7, 2006	105	6.97
Mitch meets Dennis (Rider Strong), a guy who will not go out with him unless Mitch comes out of the closet to his parents. Mitch and Jody are worried that Suzanne's co-worker Tom (Martin Mull) is sexually harassing her.
6	"Tennis, Any Crumb?"	Ted Wass	Heide Perlman	Unaired	106	N/A
Suzanne becomes jealous when Mitch begins spending more time with his girlfriend instead of her. To make her happy, he reveals to her that he is gay.
7	"Maybe I'm Tony Randall"	Ted Wass	Joel Stein	Unaired	107	N/A
Mitch has a date with a woman, and he starts to think he might not be gay. Meanwhile, Billy tries to get closer to Jody.
8	"Sleeping with the Enemies"	Ted Wass	Sung Suh	Unaired	108	N/A
Mitch becomes jealous when Jody and Andrea begin dating. Meanwhile, Billy hurts his back fixing Suzanne's roof; she takes him in and tries to win back his affections.
9	"The Gift of the Magpie"	Ted Wass	David Walpert	Unaired	109	N/A
Suzanne decides to celebrate Christmas, four months later as she missed the last one due to being in the psychiatric facility.
10	"Suzanne Gets Certified"	Ted Wass	Les Firestein & Heide Perlman	Unaired	110	N/A
After learning Billy fixed her up with her boyfriend Frank (Elliott Gould), Suzanne pretends to be crazy to legalize her divorce papers. Meanwhile, Jody reunites with his old band for a gig.
11	"A Loon Again, Naturally"	Ted Wass	David Grubstick & Roy Brown	Unaired	111	N/A
Suzanne tries to out-do Camille Spadaro (Rhea Perlman), a former mental patient who wrote an autobiography. Meanwhile, when Mitch learns that Billy spoke to the people who publish his alumni journal, he gets irate, so Billy fires him.
12	"He Ain't Hetero, He's My Brother"	Ted Wass	Story by : Regina Stewart; Teleplay by : Les Firestein & Hayes Jackson	Unaired	112	N/A
Jody blackmails Mitch when he discovers he is gay. Meanwhile, Suzanne butts heads with Frank's handicapped ex-wife Lorraine (Teri Garr), and Shelley (Illeana Douglas) ruins Billy's bachelor party.
13	"And It All Came Crumbling Down"	Ted Wass	David Walpert & Heide Perlman	Unaired	113	N/A
Billy doesn't take the news very well when Mitch comes out. Meanwhile, Shelley has second thoughts about her impending nuptials, and Suzanne decides to marry... herself.
