= Happily Ever After: Fairy Tales for Every Child =

Television series

- Genre: Animation; Anthology
- Written by: Joe Menendez; Daryl G. Nickens; Gordon Lewis; Franklyn Ajaye; Barry Douglas
- Directed by: Bruce W. Smith; Edward Bell; Anthony Bell
- Narrated by: Robert Guillaume
- Theme music composer: Diane Louie
- Composer: Stephen James Taylor
- Country of origin: United States
- Original language: English
- No. of seasons: 3
- No. of episodes: 39

Production
- Executive producer: Carole Rosen
- Running time: 30 minutes
- Production companies: Hyperion Animation; Two Oceans Entertainment Group; Confetti Entertainment Company; HBO

Original release
- Network: HBO
- Release: March 12, 1995 – July 18, 2000

Happily Ever After: Fairy Tales for Every Child is an American musical anthology animated television series that premiered on March 12, 1995, on HBO. Narrated by Robert Guillaume, the series aired 39 episodes from 1995 to 2000.

== Plot ==
Each episode details a classic story in different cultures along multiethnic characters, which contains characters voiced by famous actors, actresses, comedians, singers, rappers, dancers, models, political activists, athletes, stunt performers, and other famous celebrities.

== Episodes ==
=== Season 1 (1995) ===
No. overall	No. in season	Title	Directed by	Original release date
1	1	"Jack and the Beanstalk"	Bruce W. Smith	March 12, 1995
A retelling of the tale with an African twist. Featuring the voices of Wayne Collins as Jack, Pauletta Washington as Jack's Mother, Harry Belafonte as the Magician, Tone Loc as the Giant and Jackée Harry as the Giant's wife.
2	2	"Little Red Riding Hood"	Bruce W. Smith	March 19, 1995
The classic story of Brothers Grimm and Charles Perrault is set in the Asian country of China, where Red Happy Coat learns that some wolves can't be trusted when she makes a delivery to her grandmother. Featuring the voices of Mai Vu as Red Happy Coat, BD Wong as Big Bad Wolf, James Hong as Baba and Mr. Sung, Amy Hill as Mother and Mrs. Oolong, Pearl Huang as Mei Li and Poa Poa and Brian Tochi as the Tailor.
3	3	"Hansel and Gretel"	Bruce W. Smith	March 26, 1995
The story of Brothers Grimm is set in the Latin American country of Cuba, as Hanselito and Gretelita explore a candy house where the evil witch lives. Featuring the voices of Christopher Montoya as Hanselito, Chrissy Padilla as Greteltia, Liz Torres as Delores (the Stepmother), Cheech Marin as Alberto (the Father), Rosie Perez as Susana (the Witch), and Tito Larriva as Ricky Garbanzo.
4	4	"The Emperor's New Clothes"	Bruce W. Smith	April 2, 1995
The classic fairytale of Hans Christian Andersen is set in Japan, where an emperor is fooled into paying two rogues named Keiji and Toshio (who are posing as tailors) to create him an outfit from the "legendary Fabric of Dreams". Featuring the voices of Gedde Watanabe as the Emperor, George Takei as Keiji, Brian Tochi as the Prince, John Wesley as the Minister, Peter Jason as the Treasurer, Denice Kumagai as Toshio, and Marcus Toji as Akira.
5	5	"Rumpelstiltskin"	Bruce W. Smith	April 9, 1995
The tale of Brothers Grimm is set in the Caribbean, with an old Jamaican twist. Featuring the voices of Jasmine Guy as Jonae, Denzel Washington as King Omar, Robert Townsend as Rumpelstiltskin, Roscoe Lee Browne as Friar Ferdinand, Sherman Hemsley as the Miller, Rodney Kageyama as the Turbaned Merchant, Denice Kumagai as the Hat Merchant and Ross Mapletoft as Royal Servant.
6	6	"The Frog Prince"	Bruce W. Smith	April 16, 1995
The classic story of Brothers Grimm is set in the African jungle where a princess named Ebony meets a frog that was once a prince. Featuring the voices of Sinbad as the Frog Prince, Cree Summer as Princess Ebony, Jay Kenneth Johnson as the Magician, Tommy Davidson as the Jester, Danny Glover as the King, LeVar Burton as the Monk, Jay Leno as Jay Frog and Branford Marsalis as Branford Frog.
7	7	"Sleeping Beauty"	Bruce W. Smith	April 23, 1995
The classic story of Charles Perrault is told with a Hispanic flavor, when Rosita is cast into a long sleep by Evelina, and later awakened by Prince Luis. Featuring the voices of Marie Barrientos as Rosita, Ricardo Montalbán as King Carlos, Lucie Arnaz as Queen Maria, Paul Rodriguez as the Court Jester, Vanessa Marquez as the six fairies, Julia Migenes as Evelina the wicked fairy, Carmen Zapata as the seventh fairy, Carlos Mencia as Poncho, Jacob Vargas as Prince Luis and Ross Mapletoft as the old man.
8	8	"Rapunzel"	Bruce W. Smith	April 30, 1995
The classic story of Brothers Grimm is set in the bayous of Louisiana, Rapunzel is taken from her parents by Zenobia the Hoodoo Diva, who seeks to make her a protege and shows her such neat tricks as voodoo dolls and shrinking her head down. Rapunzel is reluctant to do this when she sees Zenobia is hurting innocent creatures. Rapunzel soon attracts a Creole prince, who must rescue Rapunzel and reunite her with her parents, but Zenobia seeks to thwart the interloper. Featuring the voices of Tisha Campbell as Rapunzel, Whoopi Goldberg as Zenobia the Hoodoo Diva, Meshach Taylor as the Woodcutter, Hazelle Goodman as the Woodcutter's Wife, Duane Martin as the Prince, Donald Fullilove as Friend #1 and Tico Wells as Friend #2.
9	9	"The Valiant Little Tailor"	Bruce W. Smith	May 7, 1995
The classic story of Brothers Grimm is set in the West African Sahel where a height-challenged tailor named Bongo sets out to prove his worth. Featuring the voices of David Alan Grier as Bongo, James Earl Jones as King Dakkar, Mark Curry as Giant, Dawnn Lewis as Princess Songe, Zakes Mokae as Mr. Babooska, Barry Shabaka Henley as Horrible-Looking Giant #1 and Hugh Dane as Horrible-Looking Giant #2.
10	10	"Cinderella"	Bruce W. Smith	May 14, 1995
The classic Charles Perrault tale gets a hilarious Hispanic twist. Featuring the voices of Daphne Zuniga as Cinderella, Liz Torres as Fairy Godmother, Edward James Olmos as Rey Emiliano, Jimmy Smits as Prince Felipe, Nely Galan as Margarita, Sonia Braga as Esmeralda, Julio Oscar Mechoso as Program Hawker, and Raquel Welch as La Madrastra.
11	11	"Beauty and the Beast"	Bruce W. Smith	May 21, 1995
The classic story of Gabrielle-Suzanne Barbot de Villeneuve is set in Africa, as a beauty falls in love with a beast. Featuring the voices of Vanessa Williams as the Beauty, Gregory Hines as the Beast, Debbie Allen as Precious, Terrence C. Carson as Tree and Paul Winfield as Father.
12	12	"Snow White"	Rufus Diznee	May 28, 1995
The classic story of Brothers Grimm is set in the American Southwest with a Native American twist about a beautiful young woman named White Snow, who befriends the seven mystical little men. Featuring the voices of Elaine Bilstad as White Snow, Jeri Arredando as Sly Fox, Graham Greene as Chief Brown Bear, Georgina Lightning as Morning Dove, Zahn McClarnon as Gray Wolf, Buffy Sainte-Marie as the Spirit in the Mirror, Marjorie Tanin as Sage Flower, Pato Hoffmann as Bright Silver, Burr DeBenning as Fool's Gold and Smelly Sulphur, Tim Sampson as Hard Jade, Jim Great Elk Waters as Rough Copper, Michael Horse as Sharp Flint, Sonny Skyhawk as Heavy Metal, and Raymond Prado as Flying Eagle.
13	13	"The Princess and the Pea"	Bruce W. Smith	June 4, 1995
The classic fairytale of Hans Christian Andersen is set in Korea, when a prince must choose a bride that will please his demanding mother only to have her subjected to a test. Featuring the voices of Bianco Min as Prince Young-Ho, Karen Lew as Princess U-Lon, Keone Young as King Ahbuhji, Steve Park as I Kwan, and Margaret Cho as Queen Uhmuhni. With Heidi Ahn, Anna Choi, Esther Hyun, Deedee Magno Hall and Theresa Mullen as the other Princesses.

=== Season 2 (1997) ===
No. overall	No. in season	Title	Directed by	Original release date
14	1	"Pinocchio"	Edward Bell	April 13, 1997
The 1800s Carlo Collodi tale gets set in the Barbary Coast, with Pinoak learning to be a real boy with the help of Woody Termite, Old George, and Blues Fairy. Featuring the voices of Will Smith as Pinocchio, Chris Rock as Woody Termite, Della Reese as the Blues Fairy, Barry Douglas as Redd Fox, Franklyn Ajaye as Sporty Cat, Charles S. Dutton as Old George, Garrett Morris as Mr. Buzzard, Brenden Jefferson as the boy, and Rachel Guillaume as the girl.
15	2	"Thumbelina"	Edward Bell	April 20, 1997
The classic fairytale of Hans Christian Andersen is set in Amazon rainforest in Brazil. Featuring the voices of Marabina Jaimes as Mother/Shair, Rosie Perez as Thumbelina, Harvey Fierstein as Mrs. Leaperman, Bronson Pinchot as Sonny, Antonio Sabato Jr. as Mario the Butterfly, Chita Rivera as Katie the Grasshopper, Debbie Allen as Lola the Ladybug, and Edward James Olmos as El Murchielago the Bat.
16	3	"Puss in Boots"	Edward Bell	April 27, 1997
The classic story of Charles Perrault gets a Hawaiian setting as a smart and mischievous cat named Puss sets out to improve the fortunes of his new master, Kuhio. Featuring the voices of David Hyde Pierce as Puss, Dean Cain as Kuhio, Pat Morita as King Makahana, Ming-Na Wen as Lani, Esther Hyun as Hawaiian Woman, Jayson Kalani as Oldest Son, Burt Bulos as Middle Son/Cane Worker, Michael Hagiwara as Guardsman/Oarsman/Pineapple Worker, and Keone Young as The Giant/Kuhio's Father/Whale/Mouse.
17	4	"The Pied Piper"	Edward Bell	May 4, 1997
The Pied Piper of Hamelin teaches a lesson in keeping promises while playing some jazz music. Featuring the voice of Wesley Snipes as the Pied Piper and music performed by Ronnie Laws. The rest of the voice cast consists of Samuel L. Jackson as the Mayor of Hamelin, Grant Shaud as Toadey, Mitch Gibney as Businessman/Yuppie Man, Denice Kumagai as Mrs. Businessman/Yuppie Woman, Tico Wells as Duke of Earl/Exterminator, Ana Alicia as Duchess of Earl/Businessman's Daughter, John Ratzenberger as Hinky, and Richard Moll as Dinky.
18	5	"The Twelve Dancing Princesses"	Edward Bell	May 11, 1997
The classic story of Brothers Grimm is set with a Hispanic retelling, as twelve young princesses sneak out of their beds to dance each night away and a smitten soldier named Juan Carlos must find out where they go if he hopes to marry one of them (and not lose his head). Featuring the voices of Daisy Fuentes as Princess Daisy, Angelines Santana as Princess Rita/Princess Marisol, Jon Secada as Juan Carlos, Héctor Elizondo as Rey Marti, Herbert Siguenza as Prince Fulanito/Andres, Rick Najera as Prince Pepito/Thug 1, Richard Montoya as Thug 2/Princely Guy, and Liz Torres as Isabel.
19	6	"The Golden Goose"	Edward Bell	May 18, 1997
In this African-American version of Brothers Grimm, lovable Simpleton is a lumberjack who shares what little he has with an old hobo, leading him to cut down a tree with a golden goose inside and soon unknowingly becoming the leader in a funny parade. Featuring the voices of Sinbad as Simpleton, Loretta Devine as the Mother, Richard Lewis as Old Beggar, James Avery as the Father, Avery Brooks as King Maximus, Vanessa Bell Calloway as Princess Katusha, Heavy D as Drexel, James Hardie as Innkeeper and Farm Hand, Phil LaMarr as Magistrate and Monk, Sugar Ray Leonard as Axel, Meagen Fay as Older Sister, Lois Foraker as Middle Sister, and Sara Rue as Younger Sister.
20	7	"The Little Mermaid"	Edward Bell	May 25, 1997
The classic fairytale of Hans Christian Andersen in this Asian setting at a secret underwater kingdom, a mermaid princess named Mija with her starfish friend Nuri is allowed to see the world above the surface and falls in love with a human prince after rescuing him. She makes a deal with a sea witch that may not turn out in her favor if she doesn't win the prince's love in return. Featuring the voices of Tia Carrere as Mija, Tim Lounibos as Chow-Yun, Margaret Cho as Hul Mu Ni, Amy Hill as Ming, Cary-Hiroyuki Tagawa as King Young-Jin, Karen Lew as Mi Kyung, Heidi Ahn as Mi-Jin, Jeanne Mori as Michiko, Brian Tochi as Turtle Photographer/Tsui, and Gedde Watanabe as Nuri.
21	8	"Goldilocks and the Three Bears"	Edward Bell	June 1, 1997
In this hilarious Jamaican version, Goldilocks has golden dreadlocks and much to learn about treating people (and bears) right. Featuring the voices of Raven-Symoné as Goldilocks, Pauletta Washington as Miss Gruff, Marcus T. Paulk as Geoffrey, Davida Williams as Angela and School Child #1, Rickey D'Shon Collins as School Child #2, Vanessa Lee Chester as School Child #3, Lou Rawls as Bat, Ben Vereen as Snake, Jenifer Lewis as Black Widow Spider, Tone Loc as Desmond Bear (Bamikki Bandula providing his singing voice), Alfre Woodard as Winsome Bear, and David Alan Grier as Dudley Bear. Note: Rumpelstiltskin makes a cameo as the bus driver, while Hanselito and Gretelita make cameos during the "We're the Bears" song.
22	9	"The Fisherman and His Wife"	Edward Bell	June 8, 1997
The classic story of Brothers Grimm is set in Spain, as a simple fisherman named Jimenez is pleased with his job as he has a loving wife named Tina, when he catches a magic talking fish named Gilbert. Gilbert warns the fisherman in a song not to take this lightly, as greed only produces more greed. Featuring the voices of Edward James Olmos as Jimenez, Julia Migenes as Tina, Rick Najera as Pig Farmer, Liz Torres as Pig Farmer's Wife, Herbert Siguenza as Prime Minister Don Rafael Manuel de la Paz Garcia, Vanessa Marquez as Female Attendant, and Paul Rodríguez as Gilbert.
23	10	"Aladdin"	Edward Bell	June 15, 1997
This version of The 1001 Nights takes place in China, when Aladdin meets a genie who wishes to be a kung fu master and uses him to rescue Jade from Chang. Featuring the voices of BD Wong as Aladdin and Genie, Joan Chen as Jade, Pearl Huang as Mother, James Hong as the Emperor, Steve Park as Dong and George Takei as Chang.
24	11	"The Elves and the Shoemaker"	Edward Bell	June 22, 1997
The classic story of Brothers Grimm is reimagined with an Aztec twist, as Tizoc the shoemaker and his wife Malinahl create shoes for the emperor and Tonatiuh the Fierce. When he must make several shoes overnight or forfeit his life, he falls asleep on the job as two elves named Coatl and Xolotl come to the rescue. Featuring the voices of Paul Rodriguez as Tizoc, Lou Diamond Phillips as Coatl, Carlos Mencia as Xolotl, Jesse Borrego as Tonatiuh the Fierce, Wanda de Jesus as Xochitl, Liz Torres as Malinahl, Abraham Verduzco as Boy and A Martinez as the Emperor.
25	12	"King Midas and the Golden Touch"	Edward Bell	June 29, 1997
The Classical Greek Mythology The powerful king of an African kingdom learns that all that glitters isn't gold when his wish to turn everything he touches into gold is granted. Featuring the voices of Blair Underwood as King Midas, Alfonso Ribeiro as Illunga, Rae'Ven Larrymore Kelly as Goldeena, John Wesley as General and Jennifer Holliday as the Dream Diva.
26	13	"Mother Goose: A Rappin' and Rhymin' Special"	Edward Bell	October 12, 1997
The Traditional Nursery Rhymes Feeling unappreciated by the denizens of Nursery Rhymes Land, Gooseberg decides to go into retirement. Now a group of beloved Nursery Rhymes characters must show how much they really care before she flies the coop. Featuring the voices of Whoopi Goldberg as the Mother, Camille Winbush as the Girl, Jimmy Smits as Old King Cole, Salt-n-Pepa as the Three Little Kittens, Regis Philbin and Kathie Lee Gifford as Jack and Jill, Jackée Harry as Little Bo-Peep, Nell Carter as Mary, Lauren Tom as Little Miss Muffet, Dave Chappelle as the Spider, Robert Pastorelli as Sgt. Louie, Denzel Washington as Humpty Dumpty and the Crooked Man, George Wallace as the cow's farmer, Rockapella as the Five Little Pigs, Steven Wright as the Bogeyman, and Marla Gibbs as Old Mother Hubbard.

=== Season 3 (1999–2000) ===
No. overall	No. in season	Title	Directed by	Original release date
27	1	"The Three Little Pigs"	Anthony Bell	June 22, 1999
This tale is told with a feminist twist and country music when three pigs go to Camp Piggywood and ward off Big Bad Wolfgang. Featuring the voices of Sinbad as Big Bad Wolfgang, Loretta Lynn as Deli Porkchop, Courteney Cox as Emerald Salt Pork, Sandra Oh as Breadcrumb, Tyra Banks as Barbie Q. Pepper, Julie Brown as Lottie Balogna, Brian Reddy as the TV announcer and the Security Guard, and Peter Renaday as Pig Daddy.
28	2	"Ali Baba and the Forty Thieves"	Anthony Bell	July 14, 1999
A girl named Ali Baba must rescue her brother Cassim, and outsmart 40 thieves to save their family. Featuring the voices of Jurnee Smollett as Ali Baba, Tommy Davidson as Cassim, Marla Gibbs as Grandmother, Will Ferrell as Mamet, George Wallace as Baba Mustafa, and Bruno Kirby as Great One.
29	3	"The Bremen Town Musicians"	Anthony Bell	August 12, 1999
The classic tale of Brothers Grimm is told with a country/African-American twist, as outcast barn animals Scratchmo, Chocolate, Hazel, and Miss Kitty become singers and go on their way to Bremen while encountering some criminals along the way. Featuring the voices of George Clinton as Scratchmo, Gladys Knight as Chocolate, Jenifer Lewis as Hazel, Dionne Warwick as Miss Kitty, Brent Jennings as Farmer Farouk, Marlon Wayans as Bad Bobby, and Shawn Wayans as Itch.
30	4	"The Empress' Nightingale"	Anthony Bell	September 16, 1999
The classic tale of Hans Christian Andersen is given a feminine makeover when a greedy empress learns about the true meaning of beauty. Featuring the voices of Pam Grier as the Empress' Nightingale, Amy Hill as the Empress, Tim Lounibos as Fisherman/Servant, Keone Young as Butler/Watchmaker, Julyana Soelistyo as Mei-Mei/Old Woman/Child, Phil Hartman as a Game Show Host in his final role, and Robin Leach as the Chamberlain. Note: This episode is dedicated in memory of Phil Hartman.
31	5	"The Happy Prince"	Anthony Bell	October 6, 1999
Based on Oscar Wilde's short story, a statue and a New York City pigeon work together to help the poor. Featuring the voices of Ed Koch as the Happy Prince (a former mayor who is now a statue), Cyndi Lauper as Pidge, Carol Ann Susi as Third Pigeon, Candy Brown as Old Woman/Actress, Carol Kiernan as French Nanny and Irish Tourist, J.W. Smith as Doorman/Factory Worker, and Phil LaMarr as Second Pigeon and New Mayor.
32	6	"Henny Penny"	Anthony Bell	November 2, 1999
Henny Penny convinces barnyard denizens that the sky is falling. Featuring the voices of Sharon Stone as Henny Penny, Patricia Welch as the singing voice for Henny Penny, Henry Kissinger as Ducky Daddles, Mary Hart as Lucy Goosey, Jesse Jackson as Cocky Locky, Johnnie Cochran as Foxy Woxy, Alan M. Dershowitz as Turkey Lurkey, Geraldine A. Ferraro as Merle, Rudolph W. Giuliani as Earl, and John McLaughlin as Wooster Rooster.
33	7	"The Frog Princess"	Anthony Bell	January 3, 2000
In this country version of a Russian fairy tale, a frog princess proves that love conquers all. Featuring the voices of Jasmine Guy as Frog Princess Lylah, Greg Kinnear as Prince Gavin, Wallace Langham as Prince Bobby/Fish, Mary Gross as Elise, Beau Bridges as King Big Daddy, Anne-Marie Johnson as Verena, and Scott Thompson as Prince Rip/Rabbit.
34	8	"The Princess and the Pauper"	Anthony Bell	February 21, 2000
The classic Mark Twain novel is told with an African-American and feminist twist where a princess named Princess Olivia and a poor girl named Zoe exchange identities. Featuring the voices of Raven-Symoné as Princess Olivia and Zoe, David Alan Grier as King Maynard VI, Phylicia Rashad as Lady Fulton, Andre Braugher as Julian Andrews, Cleo King as Nana/Servant 2, Jeannie Elias as a Newspaper Boy/Servant 1, John Wesley as the Supreme Justice, Iqbal Theba as East Indian Driver, Michael Ralph as Peachfuzz #1/Trumpeter/Officer, Ivory Ocean as Peachfuzz #2/Sentencer, and John Witherspoon as Scofflaw.
35	9	"Rip Van Winkle"	Anthony Bell	March 21, 2000
In this adaptation of the classic Washington Irving short story and American tall tale as a fairy tale, Vanna Van is married to a heavy metal rocker named Rip Winkle. However, Rip is a sexist who prefers going on the road to nurturing Vanna's own musical skills or helping her with hearth and home. Vanna's fairy godmentor gives Rip some time to sleep on things (20 years to be exact) and he wakes up to a world where Vanna has helped change things for the better. Featuring the voices of Tom Arnold as Rip Winkle, Calista Flockhart as Vanna Van, Patricia Welch as the singing voice for Vanna, Sandra Bernhard as the Bluebird, Maya Angelou as Fairy Godmentor, Martin Grey as the Assistant and R.J., Gary Lazer as Rocky, Linda Ellerbee, Betty Friedan, Jessye Norman, and Ann Richards as the Thunder Mountain Women, and Gloria Steinem as Female Narrator/Esther.
36	10	"The Snow Queen"	Anthony Bell	April 18, 2000
The classic fairy tale of Hans Christian Andersen is an Inuk setting as the Snow Queen freezes a boy's heart and takes him to her icy castle. Only his best friend, a girl with a powerful heart, can save him. Featuring the voices of Eartha Kitt as the Snow Queen, Táska Cleveland as Gerda, T'Keyah Crystal Keymah as the Grandmother and the Robber Girl, Brandon Hammond as Kai, Doug E. Doug as the Raven, and Bronson Pinchot as the Killer Whale and the Reindeer.
37	11	"The Steadfast Tin Soldier"	Anthony Bell	May 16, 2000
The classic fairy tale of Hans Christian Andersen is a set of tin soldiers inspires a girl's imagination and its one-legged leader conquers all obstacles to reach a dancer toy she loves. Featuring the voices of Tisha Campbell as Goldie, En Vogue as Dolls 1 (Cindy Herron), 2 (Terry Ellis), and 3 (Maxine Jones), Savion Glover as the Dancer, Kadeem Hardison as the Clown, Ruby Dee as the Grandma, Rae'Ven Larrymore Kelly as Imani, Q-Tip as the Teddy Bear and the Cockroach, Caroline Rhea as Spidey, Guy Torry as Hugo, Michael Andrew MacArthur as Ant/Huckster, and Kim Wayans as Jackie-In-The-Box and Lulu.
38	12	"Robinita Hood"	Anthony Bell	June 19, 2000
The tale of Robin Hood is told with a Latin American Hispanic feminist twist. Set in old Puerto Rico, Robinita Hood leads her band of the Merry Chicas to stop Sheriff Juan Jose del Ramon de Jamon and his minion Sir Gooey with the help of her love interest Mario. Featuring the voices of Rosie Perez as Robinita Hood, Marc Anthony as Mario, Rick Najera as Sheriff Juan Jose del Ramon de Jamon, Daphne Rubin-Vega as Little Juana, Idalis DeLeón as Guillermina Scarlet, Nancy Garcia as Elena Dale, Nestor Carbonell as Sir Gooey, and Ian Gomez as Basilio.
39	13	"Aesop's Fables: A Whodunit Musical"	Anthony Bell	July 18, 2000
Set in London, England, a beautiful detective tracks down Aesop's Fables which has been stolen by some Aesop characters in this whodunit. Featuring the voices of Angie Dickinson as the Detective, Diahann Carroll as the Crow, Dabney Coleman as Monsieur Fox, Harvey Korman as the Lion, Jaleel White as The Boy Who Cried Wolf, Katey Sagal as the Hare, Kevin Pollak as the Mouse and the Grasshopper, Melanie Chartoff as Grape Fox, and Ruth Brown as the Tortoise and the Ant.

== Home media ==
Most episodes of Happily Ever After: Fairy Tales for Every Child were released on VHS by Random House Home Video, and, later HBO Home Video, but only a few episodes were released on DVD. There was one DVD with four episodes ("Pinocchio", "The Pied Piper", "The Golden Goose", and "Mother Goose: A Rapping and Rhyming Special") and one DVD with only one episode ("Robinita Hood"). In the United Kingdom, the series was released on DVD by Prism Leisure, there are four DVDs with three episodes on each.

All episodes except The Emperor's New Clothes are streaming on HBO Max in the United States.
