= Kenny Sahr =

Israeli technology executive (born 1971)

- קני סהר
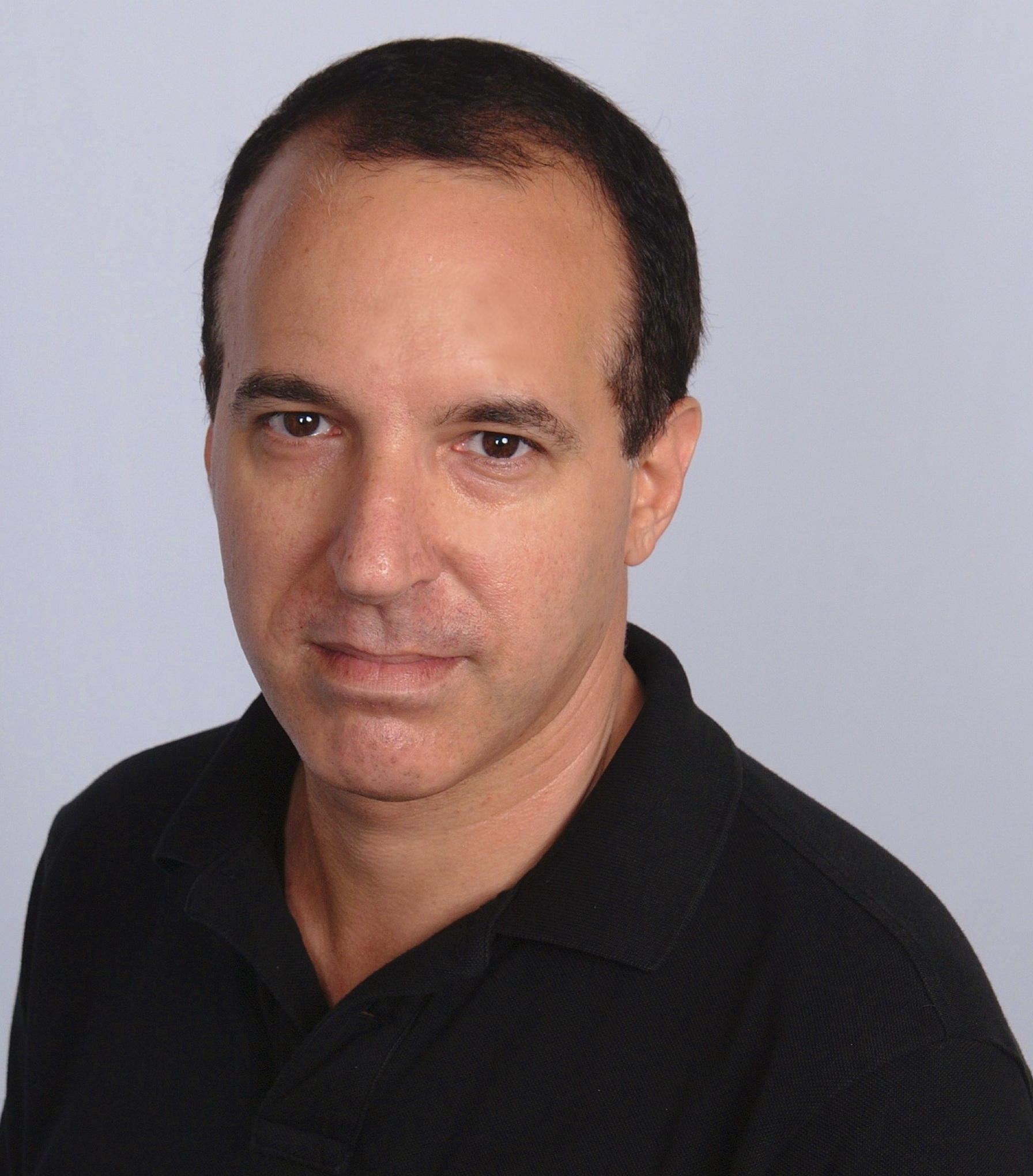
- Sahr in 2016
- Born: August 18, 1971 (age 55); Portland, Maine, United States
- Citizenship: American and Israeli
- Occupation: Internet entrepreneur
- Organization: School Sucks
- Known for: SchoolSucks.com and technology marketing

Kenny Sahr (Hebrew: קני סהר; born August 18, 1971) is an Israeli technology executive. He has served as VP of marketing at Sodyo and RadView Software.

He was the founder of the Internet's first free homework and term paper website, SchoolSucks.com. He is a regular contributor to The Times of Israel.

== Early life ==
Sahr was born in Portland, Maine, but spent most of his childhood in Miami, Florida. After high school, he moved to Israel and spent three years in the Israel Defense Forces, where he served in the Spokesman’s Unit.

== Career ==
In 1994, after completing his army service, he wrote the first Hebrew-language travel guide to Jordan and Syria.

Sahr founded School Sucks in 1996. It was among the early 1990s dot-coms. The website earned revenues from advertising. The site was featured prominently in the media during its 17-year run, including Time magazine, 60 Minutes, and The New York Times.

Sahr has since served as a Marketing Director at Panaya, and VP Marketing at RadView and Sodyo. He writes about online marketing at Times of Israel and on LinkedIn Pulse. He developed the marketing method of "Blog as a Landing Page" as an alternative to landing pages.

Sahr has written extensively about the consumer cloud and Google. In 2014, Sahr wrote, “Google is now the master of the consumer cloud. The knockout punch was Google Drive."

In 2019, Sahr released a book titled The Startup Marketing Bible: A Practical Guide To Startup Marketing.

=== School Sucks ===
On 17 May 1996, Sahr launched the Internet's first free homework and term paper website - School Sucks. The website took a tongue-in-cheek approach to the media while claiming that a lot of the papers were garbage. Sahr also claimed that School Sucks could help students by giving them the opportunity to see how other students have approached various topics in their college papers.

School Sucks was a library of free term papers, though many of the site's advertisers were companies that sold term papers on a per-page basis.

In 1997, Turnitin.com was launched as a way to prevent online plagiarism. The founders of Turnitin.com and School Sucks made their cases as part of a 60 Minutes investigation.

School Sucks was one of the first websites to earn revenues from ad banners. As the site's founder, Sahr was among the first to introduce interactive ad banners, landing pages, email campaigns and monthly subscriptions.
