= Yulianna Karaulova =

Russian singer (born 1988)

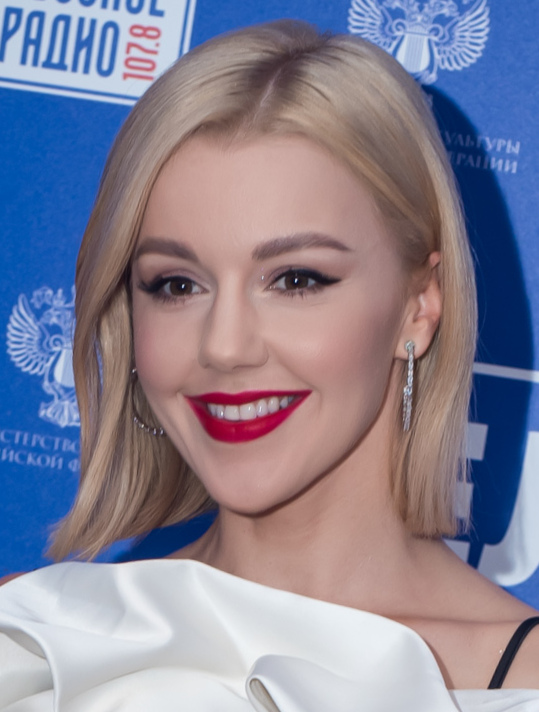
- Karaulova in 2023

Background information
- Born: Yulianna Yurievna Karaulova; 24 April 1988 (age 38); Moscow, RSFSR, Soviet Union
- Genres: Russian pop
- Occupation: Singer
- Years active: 2003–present
- Label: Zion Music

Yulianna Yurievna Karaulova (Russian: Юлианна Юрьевна Караулова; born 24 April 1988 in Moscow) is a Russian singer, television presenter and former lead singer of 5sta Family, and a former finalist of Fabrika Zvyozd 5.

== Biography ==
Karaulova was born in Moscow on 24 April 1988. When she was four years old, her father was sent to the diplomatic service in Bulgaria, so she and her family moved to the country's capital, Sofia. She studied at the School of the Russian Embassy in Bulgaria. At the age of 11, she returned to Moscow and finished school there.

In 2003, Karaulova placed second in the "Person of the Year" competition organized by a local teen magazine Yes!. She eventually became one of the singers of the Yes! musical group.

In 2004, she became a member of the Channel One Russia "Fabrika Zvyozd 5" under the direction of Alla Pugacheva, and reached the finals. By the end of the project, Karaulova joined a new group of Maxim Fadeev's Netsuke.

After the "Fabrika Zvyozd", she studied in London for six months, while occasionally working as an editor for the Yes! magazine.

In 2011, Karaulova became a soloist of the group "5sta Family". During 4 years of staying there, the band recorded several hits and won a number of nominations and awards, including Golden Gramophone Award 2013.

In 2014, Karaulova graduated from the producer faculty Gnessin State Musical College, having previously graduated from the faculty of pop-jazz vocal academy.

On 20 September 2015 Karaulova announced her departure from "5sta Family" to begin a solo career.

She appeared in the sixth season of ice show contest Ice Age.

In April 2023, Karaulova became the current host of the Russian version of Who Wants To Be A Millionaire?, known as Kto khochet stat' millionerom?.

== Personal life ==
Karaulova is in a relationship with sound producer Andrey Cherny. On 29 May 2021 Yulianna gave birth to a son, Alexander.

== Discography ==
=== Solo studio albums ===
- 2016: Чувство Ю / Chuvstvo Yu / Sense Of Yu
- 2017: Феномены / Fenomeny / Phenomena
- 2019: Быть сильными / Byt' Sil'nymi / To Be Strong

=== Singles ===
- 2015: Ты не такой / Ty Ne Takoy / You're Not Like That
- 2015: Хьюстон / Khyuston / Houston
- 2016: Внеорбитные / Vneorbitnye / Extra-Orbital
- 2016: Море / More / Sea
- 2016: Разбитая любовь / Razbitaya Lyubov' / Broken Love (cover version of a song by Lx24)
- 2017: Не верю / Ne Veryu / I Don't Believe
- 2017: Просто так / Prosto Tak / Just So
- 2019: Лучший враг / Luchshiy Vrag / Best Enemy
