= Sergey Milnichenko =

Russian composer

Sergei Milnichenko
- Born: July 13, 1966 (age 59); Tomsk, Russian SFSR, USSR
- Occupations: Composer, songwriter, guitarist, record producer
- Years active: 1981–present
- Known for: Record producer of group Ranetkigroup “Pudra (Powder)”, Dmitriy Prianov, group “Kroliki (Rabbits) ”, group “Vorobyi (Sparrows).”
- Spouse(s): Larisa Alina (divorced; 1 child); Natalya Milnichenko (m.2009-present)
- Children: Rassveta Milnichenko

Sergei Grigoryevich Milnichenko (Russian: Серге́й Григо́рьевич Мильниче́нко; born on July 13, 1966, in Tomsk, Russian SFSR, USSR) is a Russian composer, songwriter, guitarist and record producer. His career began in the Soviet era.

== Personal life ==
At 15 years of age, Sergey became interested in playing the bass guitar in a band called “Paradox” with a guitarist “Igor Jirinov.” After several years of playing at different venues, his interests shifted into music arrangements. He studied in Tomsk’s music school and finished three courses in Kreml’s institute of art. He worked as an arranger and sound producer in the group “Na-Na”. He was the co-producer of Andrey Gubin, and took part in the recording of Jasmine “Rewrite Love” in 2001. He participated as the producer, lyricist and music arranger of the band “Fantasy”. Since 2005, he has been the producer of the group “Ranetki”, which he brought together by the means of issuing an internet ad that searched for young and talented boys and girls, aged 14–17. He worked with artists such as Vladimir Asmolov, Mihail Mihailov, Philip Kirkorov, Vladimir Kuzmin, Matalia Moskvina, as well as writing music for the television series “Kadetsvo.”, “Ranetki”, “I’m flying”, “The last chord,” and writing music for programs on channels such as “CTC”, “NTV”, “Russia”. Further, he produced musical shows: “CTC Ignites a Super Star 2”,”School of music on U-TV”, and is currently producing: group “Ranetki”, group “Pudra (Powder)”, Dmitriy Prianov, group “Kroliki (Rabbits) ”, group “Vorobyi (Sparrows).”
