= Lena Tretyakova =

Russian singer (born 1988)

- Born: 23 December 1988 (age 37); Legnica, Poland
- Genres: pop-rock, pop
- Instruments: vocals, bass guitar, acoustic guitar, keyboards
- Years active: 2005–рresent
- Website: lenatretyakova.ru

Elena Nikolaevna Tretyakova (Russian: Елена Николаевна Третьякова; born 23 December 1988, Legnica, Poland) is a Russian singer, bassist, and a former member of the Russian girls pop-rock group Ranetki (in 2005 to 2013).

== Career ==
Since February 2012 to November 2015, she was a solo singer. From November 2015 she was soloist of the Sea Band.

Tretyakova graduated from Moscow State Art and Cultural University. In the spring of 2021, she came out as a bisexual, stating that she had relationships with girls. She is fond of and teaches kundalini yoga.

=== Studio albums ===
The group Ranetki:

- Ranetki (2006)
- Our Time Has Come (2009)
- Do Not Ever Forget (2010)
- Bring Back the Rock-n-roll (2011)

Solo albums:

- Point B (2014)
- The Dozen (2015)

=== Filmography ===
- 2008–2009 Ranetki (TV series) as Elena Kulemina
- 2009–2010 Ranetki Live – Revelation teens
- 2010 Once in Babene-Babene (TV)
- 2010 Winx Club: The Secret of the Lost Kingdom as Layla (Russian voice)
- 2016 Alexander Peresvet – Kulikovo Echo as Anya
- 2017 Detained (short) as Extra
- 2019 Lethalz (short) as Young Lindsay
