= 5sta Family =

Russian music group

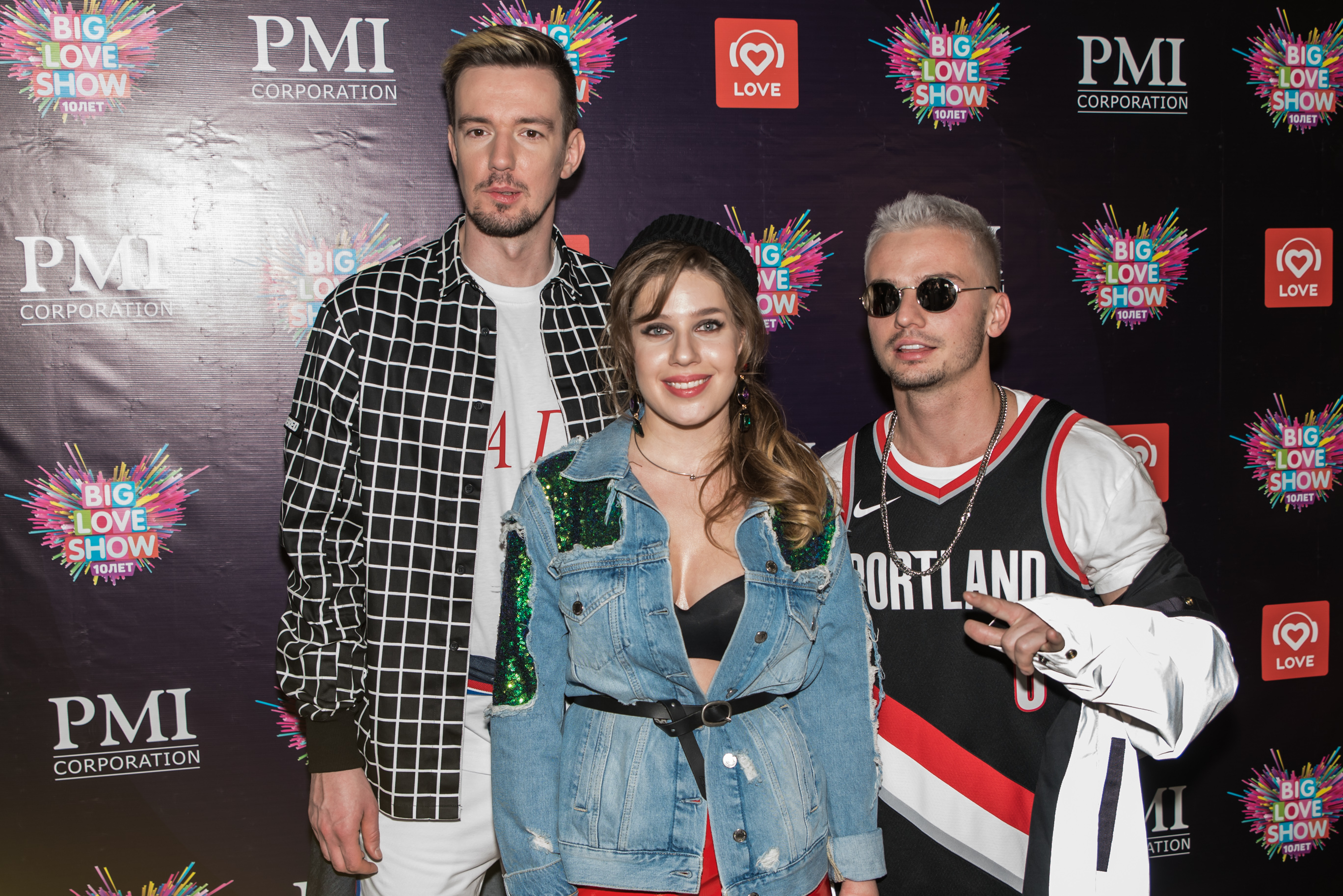

Background information
- Origin: Moscow
- Genres: Pop; Pop rap; R&B; Hip-Hop
- Years active: 2004–present
- Label: Zion Music
- Members: Olga Zasulskaya; Valery Efremov; Vasily Kosinsky
- Past members: Yulianna Karaulova; Anton Radaev; Valeriya Kozlova

5sta Family (until 2011 known as «5ivesta Family») is a Russian pop group from Moscow.

== History ==
In May 2009 5sta Family with the group «23:45» released the single «Я буду». The song became one of the most popular on the radio, lasting ten weeks on the Russian radiocharts. According to the results of 2009, it was the fourth most downloaded single in Russia. The single achieved platinum status in Russia, selling over 200,000 copies.

The group's next single, — «Зачем?», released in 2010, became a number one hit on Russian radio.

In March 2011 Loya left the group and in her place signed Yulianna Karaulova, a member on the show «Fabrika Zvyozd». In autumn of that year was the launch of the music video for the song «Тук-тук».

On 21 January 2016 the group released a new single «Стирая границы». In May they released the single «Футболка», for which in the same month the group filmed a music video.

On 26 January 2017 the group released the single «Везувий». On 28 April that same year was the release of the song «Многоэтажки». In May 2017 the group was banned from entering Ukraine for seven years by a decision from the Verkhovna Rada. On 27 November it was announced that former soloist Loya returned to the group. On 5 December, the group premiered the single «Снова вместе», and on 2 April 2018, the music video for the song was released.

On 9 December 2019 the group premiered the composition «Первый снег».

== Discography ==
=== Studio albums ===
Year	Russian title	Translation	Information
2012	Зачем? (Zachem?)	What For?	Release: 15 January 2012; Label: Zion Music; Format: CD, Digital

=== Singles ===
Year	Russian title	Translation	Album
2008	Ночной город (Nochnoy Gorod)	Night City	Зачем? (Zachem?)
2009	Я буду (Ya Budu)	I'll Be	Зачем? (Zachem?)
2010	Зачем? (Zachem?)	What For?	Зачем? (Zachem?)
2010	На расстоянии звонка (Na Rasstoyaniyi Zvonka)	One Call Away	Зачем? (Zachem?)
2011	Просыпайся (Prosypaysya)	Wake Up	Зачем? (Zachem?)
2011	Тук-тук (Tuk-Tuk)	Knock Knock	Зачем? (Zachem?)
2012	Вместе мы (Vmeste My)	Together We Are	Зачем? (Zachem?)
2013	Буду с тобой (Budu S Toboy)	I'll Be With You	—N/a
2014	Моя мелодия (Moya Melodiya)	My Melody	—N/a
2015	Метко (Metko)	Accurately	—N/a
2016	Футболка (Futbolka)	T-Shirt	—N/a
2017	Многоэтажки (Mnogoetazhki)	Multi-Storey Buildings	—N/a
2017	Снова вместе (Snova Vmeste)	Together Again	—N/a
2019	Один на один (Odin Na Odin)	One On One	—N/a
2020	Эгоистка (Egoistka)	Egoist	—N/a
2021	Аллилуйя (Alliluya)	Hallelujah	—N/a
2022	Неважно (Nevazhno)	Doesn't Matter	—N/a
2022	Войсы (Voisy)	Voice Messages	—N/a
2024	В июле (V Iyule)	In July	—N/a
