= Welt Yang =

Character in the Honkai video game series

- Honkai character
- Official artwork of Welt as he appears in Honkai: Star Rail
- First appearance: Sakura Remembrance chapter 7: "Kiana's Greatest Crisis" (2015)
- First game: Honkai Impact 3rd (2019)
- Voiced by: English: Corey Landis (2023–2026); Brian T. Delaney (2026–present); Chinese: Dai Chaohang (HI3); Nuoya (child; HI3); Peng Bo (HSR); Japanese: Yoshimasa Hosoya; Mariya Ise (child); Korean: Han-shin

In-universe information
- Full name: Joachim Nokianvirtanen
- Type: Imaginary
- Paths: Nihility (combat), Trailblaze (lore)

Welt Yang (Chinese: 瓦尔特·杨; pinyin: Wǎ'ěrtè Yáng), real name Joachim Nokianvirtanen (/ˈjoʊɑːxɪm/ YOH-ah-kheem; 约阿希姆·诺基安维塔宁; Yuē'āxīmǔ Nuòjī'ānwéitǎníng), is a character from the Honkai video game series developed by miHoYo. The character first appeared in version 2.9 of Honkai Impact 3rd in 2019, where he serves as the leader of an anti-cataclysmic organization known as Anti-Entropy. The character also appears as one of the main characters in Honkai: Star Rail, in which he is a member of the fictional organization known as the Astral Express crew.

Welt was generally received positively for his connections to both games and for his high damage output in Honkai: Star Rail.

== Design and voice acting ==
Welt Yang is the only character in the Honkai series to appear in multiple games. Prior to his first in-game appearance, he debuted in the Honkai Impact 3rd manhua Sakura Remembrance and subsequently appeared in other related works, such as the web visual novel Anti-Entropy and the manhua Second Eruption. For Welt's character design in Honkai Impact 3rd, the development team initially had Welt wear a black jacket and scarf, but later added a Western-style inner layer. The final design included a much lighter gray coat, dark pants, and a scarf loosely worn across the chest. In his character illustration in Honkai: Star Rail, the background also features several characters from the prior game. His Light Cone (weapon equivalent) in Honkai: Star Rail is called "In the Name of the World", which tells the story of how he came to inherit the name "Welt" (German for "world"), as well as his connection with the Honkai Impact 3rd character Welt Joyce. As part of the promotion effort, Honkai: Star Rail released a video discussing his combat capabilities on April 30, 2023.

In Honkai Impact 3rd, Welt Yang appears as a non-playable character midway through the game, whereas in Honkai: Star Rail, he has been a playable character since the game's launch. He also appeared in the game's first gameplay reveal trailer, released by miHoYo on October 7, 2021.

The normal and adult version of Welt Yang is voiced in Chinese in Honkai Impact 3rd by Dai Chaohang, and in Japanese by Yoshimasa Hosoya. His child form is voiced in Chinese by Nuoya and in Japanese by Mariya Ise. (Note: Honkai Impact 3rd does not offer dubs in English or Korean.) In Honkai: Star Rail, his Chinese voice is provided by Peng Bo. Hosoya remained his Japanese voice actor, while Han-shin voiced Welt in Korean, and Corey Landis voiced him in English up until March 2026, when the latter was replaced by Brian T. Delaney.

== Appearances ==
=== Honkai Impact 3rd ===
Welt Yang, originally born Joachim Nokianvirtanen, grows up around the scientists of Laboratory 42, a research center tied to Schicksal, the powerful but ruthless organization fighting the supernatural phenomenon known as the Honkai. His childhood is shaped in part by Welt Joyce, the first Herrscher of Reason. Herrschers are superhumans who wield Herrscher cores, sources of immense power tied to the Honkai. Joachim's life is shattered when Otto Apocalypse, Schicksal's manipulative Overseer, forces his father to indirectly cause a catastrophic Honkai disaster in New York City and kills him. During that battle, Welt Joyce and Reanna Brigantia, an elite Valkyrie, (Note: In Honkai Impact 3rd, Valkyries are female warriors trained to fight the Honkai.) both die protecting others, and Joyce passes his Herrscher core, title and mission to Joachim. Taking the name "Welt" after his mentor, Joachim becomes the second Herrscher of Reason. He also adopted his mother's maiden name, Yang. He helps found Anti-Entropy, a faction opposed to Schicksal, and begins a life defined by sacrifice and unescapable responsibility.

As Anti‑Entropy's leader, Welt becomes one of humanity’s strongest defenders, battling threats like Sirin, the Second Herrscher whose power nearly ends the world. He fights alongside major figures such as Cecilia Schariac, Schicksal's greatest Valkyrie, and Siegfried Kaslana, a warrior from a family renowned for resisting the Honkai. Though he loses his body during the Second Eruption and survives only by hiding his consciousness in the Core of Reason, he later rebuilds his body, mentors future heroes like Murata Himeko, and uncovers the cosmic threat of the Sky People, an alien civilization that destroys worlds. His later years take him into the Sea of Quanta, a chaotic multiverse where he confronts Kevin Kaslana, the ruthless leader of World Serpent, and sacrifices himself again, leaving behind a younger self‑image who guides Bronya Zaychik, one of the game's protagonists, into becoming the next Herrscher of Reason. Eventually, Earth is threatened with an alien invasion. Welt and Void Archives, an entity formed from a group of sentient weapons, infiltrate one of the alien ships, which eventually leads to them being stranded in outer space and finding out that the Sky People are targeting the Himeko from Honkai: Star Rail. Welt thus was brought into the alternate reality of Honkai: Star Rail so he could save her.

=== Honkai: Star Rail ===
==== Story ====
Welt and Void Archives are rescued by the Astral Express, which happened to be passing by while they were stranded. Both subsequently board the train, with Welt becoming one of its crew members, while Void Archives later departs before the beginning of the game. In the Companion Mission "A Knight Stranger", Welt and March 7th assist the Divination Commission of the Xianzhou Luofu in identifying suspicious individuals on the Xianzhou. Upon seeing Luocha, Welt recognizes his appearance and remarks that he has encountered at least two of his "counterparts" in other universes, referring to Otto Apocalypse.

==== Gameplay ====
Welt is a 5-star Imaginary damage dealer who walks the Path of the Nihility. His Basic Attack deals Imaginary damage to a single enemy. His Skill slashes a random enemy three times and has a chance to reduce the target's speed. His ultimate deals Imaginary damage to all enemies and imprisons them all. The actions of an enemy who is imprisoned are delayed and their speed is reduced.

== Reception ==
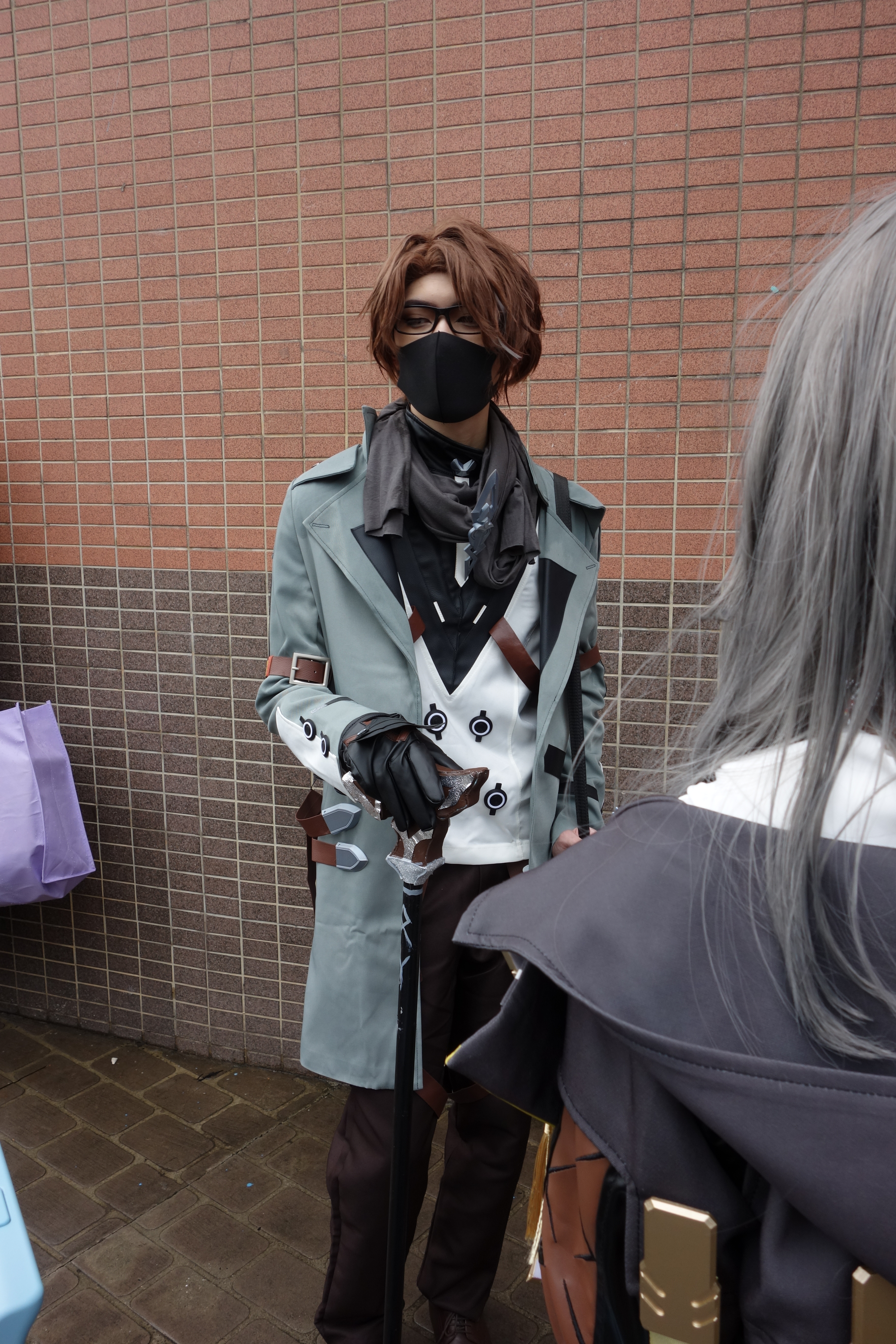
Cosplay of Welt as he appears in Honkai: Star Rail

There were some differences between Welt's outfits in Honkai Impact 3rd as compared to Honkai: Star Rail. In a review of the insight offered by miHoYo of the character's clothes, Siliconera editor Jenni Lada described his early designs in Honkai Impact 3rd as formal and simplistic. The editorial department for 4Gamer described the changes in outfit between games, speculating that Welt was the same person in both games, but adding that there was a stark difference between his outfits. Writer Jisuroma of Denfaminico Gamer said that the character's outfit in Star Rail looked different to him after playing the game as compared to before, and added that there were characters from the prior game in Welt's character art. They described their reaction as being captivated by the idea that the art, which they had originally thought was ordinary, took on a new context upon learning about Welt's past.

Welt's characterization was generally received well. When writing a build guide for him, Tilly Lawton of Pocket Tactics described the character as smart and calm, adding that he was a cornerstone other characters could lean on when needed. Jisuroma meanwhile described Welt as a grandfather- or uncle-like figure, but said his background was so difficult to explain that they did not know where to begin. They compared the complexity of his background to that of the Japanese samurai Tokugawa Yoshinobu, writing that accurately describing his background in detail would take a great amount of time. Yan Ku of Yahoo News concurred, describing the idea of condensing Welt's past (which she described as complicated) as a herculean task. She also said that Welt had no more reason to become humanity's protector after discovering that the Himeko that was being targeted by the Sky People was the Star Rail Himeko and not the one Welt was familiar with, but chose to protect her anyway. She finished her article by saying that miHoYo has used the idea of parallel universes in their games before, and that they were taking advantage of it with Welt, writing that "it [was] confirmed that all their games so far exist within the same World Tree as its branches". Jisuroma also wrote that Welt's voice line in Honkai: Star Rail that activates when he uses his ultimate had a different emotional impact on them after playing Honkai Impact 3rd than before.

Jess Reyes of Inverse described Welt's past as mysterious, and expressed said that there was sufficient evidence to prove that the Welt in Honkai Impact 3rd was the same person as the Welt in Star Rail. Writing for The Loadout, Aaron Down speculated that Welt traveled to the Star Rail universe after discovering the antagonists of the Honkai Impact 3rd quest "A Post-Honkai Odyssey" wanted to invade the Star Rail universe, intending to protect Himeko. He also theorized that the two Himekos were alternate versions of one another, but added that this information was not confirmed. Yan Ku suggested that Star Rail players interested in learning more about Welt's past before the events of the game should play Honkai Impact 3rd as well as read the latter's official manhua, but clarified that she did not believe it was necessary for everyone to have played Honkai Impact 3rd in order to fully understand Star Rail because the stories are independent of each other. She and Jisuroma argued that Welt is one of several "expies", or characters exported from one game to another, that were present in Star Rail, but conversely Raddie Perez of TheGamer wrote that Welt is the only character confirmed to have traveled between the two games' universes. A writer for AppBank described Welt's reaction to seeing the character Luocha in Star Rail as Welt being suspicious of him because of Luocha's resemblance to Otto Apocalypse and speculated that this could be a reference to Honkai Impact 3rd.

Regarding a crossover event between the two games in November 2024, Lada mentioned that a promotional video for the event featured Star Rail writer Shaoji and Honkai Impact 3rd artist RJ joking that Welt would likely have an important role in the event due to his status as a Herrscher in Honkai Impact 3rd. Daz Skubich commented that the crossover event would have significant implications regarding Welt's lore because of the part he played in Honkai Impact 3rd, and mentioned a line in the event's promotional trailer which said "You can go home now". Skubich said that it would be interesting to watch how he interacted with the other characters from both games in the event. In the promotional video, Shaoji jokingly rejected the idea that Welt would decide to return to the universe of Honkai Impact 3rd because it would leave the Star Rail story incomplete. In a summary of the promotional video, the proposed battle between Welt and Bronya was described by the staff of 4Gamer as "a clash of old and new Herrschers". That author went on to say that their expectations for the crossover event were that it would be about Welt returning to the world of Honkai Impact 3rd, but they expressed confusion when Welt was shown "throwing the Void Manifestation around" instead. A writer for Inside said they had high expectations for Welt during the crossover, and wondered what role he would play in the plot. An editor for Famitsu stated that the quest indeed focused on Welt and that it had a serious atmosphere, but that there was also humor that they believed would make players who were aware of Welt's past laugh.

Welt's gameplay in Honkai: Star Rail was generally received positively, and he has been described as a powerful character to use in combat. Lawton indicated that Welt "excels at immobilizing the enemy", applying debuffs against enemies to win battles. Elara Leclair of Game Rant described him as one of Star Rail's most anticipated characters, and theorized that players liked him because of his high potential for damage and debuffs. Marco Wutz wrote that Welt was one of the few characters available upon the game's launch that dealt Imaginary damage. Danielle Rose of PCGamesN concurred, describing him as powerful; Harry Alston and Sanyam Jain of TheGamer described Welt as one of the best characters for players who are starting out in Star Rail, and said that Welt can become powerful if he is equipped with the correct Light Cone. Bruno Yonezawa of Screen Rant had a slightly less positive view of Welt's gameplay, writing that while he did not consider Welt as a top-tier character at launch, he was still impressed by Welt's performance in combat. He argued that Welt's abilities not only debuff enemies but also damage them severely, making Welt a strong contributor to a party's overall damage output if he has his signature Light Cone equipped.
