= Nodusfall =

Upcoming video game

- Developer: miHoYo
- Publishers: CHN: miHoYo; WW: HoYoverse
- Engine: Unreal Engine 5
- Release: TBA
- Genres: Action, Role-playing
- Modes: Multiplayer, Co-op

Nodusfall (Chinese: 源初之结; pinyin: Yuánchū zhījié; lit. 'The Knot of the Beginning') is an upcoming co-op action game developed and published by miHoYo. The game is the second title miHoYo has developed using Unreal Engine 5 after Varsapura. Its planned platforms have yet to be announced.

== Gameplay ==
Nodusfall is a co-op action game where players form squads to fight large mythical beasts. Its combat emphasizes tactical coordination and sustained offensive pressure to expose and exploit enemy vulnerabilities for decisive attacks. Characters can be customized with varied combat styles and skill combinations. Defeating enemies rewards players with resources used to unlock new weapons and abilities, enabling further character progression and playstyle adaptation.

== Premise ==
Set on a mythic fantasy continent where divine authority has dissolved, Nodusfall takes place in a fractured world plagued by the emergence of the "Dreadnodi"—mysterious entities that spread corruption and warp legendary beasts into destructive threats. The setting draws heavily from diverse global mythologies, blending creatures and traditions ranging from Eastern folklore beasts to Western dragons across distinct ecological, cultural, and historical regions.

The story follows the "Weavers," divinely created beings tasked with altering the world's fate. Their mission is to confront corrupted creatures, eradicate the Dreadnodi threat at its source, and reclaim the world's remaining remnants of divinity to stabilize the world again, alongside other companions.

== Announcement and development ==
Nodusfall is developed and locally published by Chinese developer miHoYo, with global publishing by HoYoverse. During 2024, miHoYo was engaged in research and development for five unreleased titles. Among them, the game was mentioned in a recruitment concept video posted to RedNote. In April 2026, HoYoVerse began filing trademarks and launching global social media accounts under the title "Nodusfall". The game has been visually compared to Elden Ring, due to its dark fantasy aspects, and pseudo-realistic graphics.

The game was officially announced live at Gamescom on August 25, 2026. miHoYo CEO Liu Wei commented after the presentation that the development of Nodusfall felt very "un-miHoYo". Liu noted various challenges in producing a large-scale, "realistic fantasy" multiplayer title. Since the studio was founded in 2011, miHoYo has gained a following and development experience creating primarily anime-styled gacha games, making Nodusfall's departure in scope and art direction notable. Liu stated that he hopes to "surprise" fans of their previous works with this new project.

Regarding the game's monetization system, miHoYo stated while speaking with PC Gamer that a model based on "cosmetic monetization" was one that they were "considering". Though still free-to-play, this marks a shift from their previous games, as characters in Nodusfall are said to "not be obtained from random draws, but through continued play". In hands-on preview coverage, journalist Fraser Brown noted that the game's monetization model is intended to focus on optional cosmetic items, such as customizable outfits, hairstyles, and accessories.

Pre-registration for Nodusfall became available after the announcement on August 25, 2026.
