= Shandong Experimental High School =

Public school in Shandong, China

Coordinates: 36.6639°N 117.0114°E

- 山东省实验中学
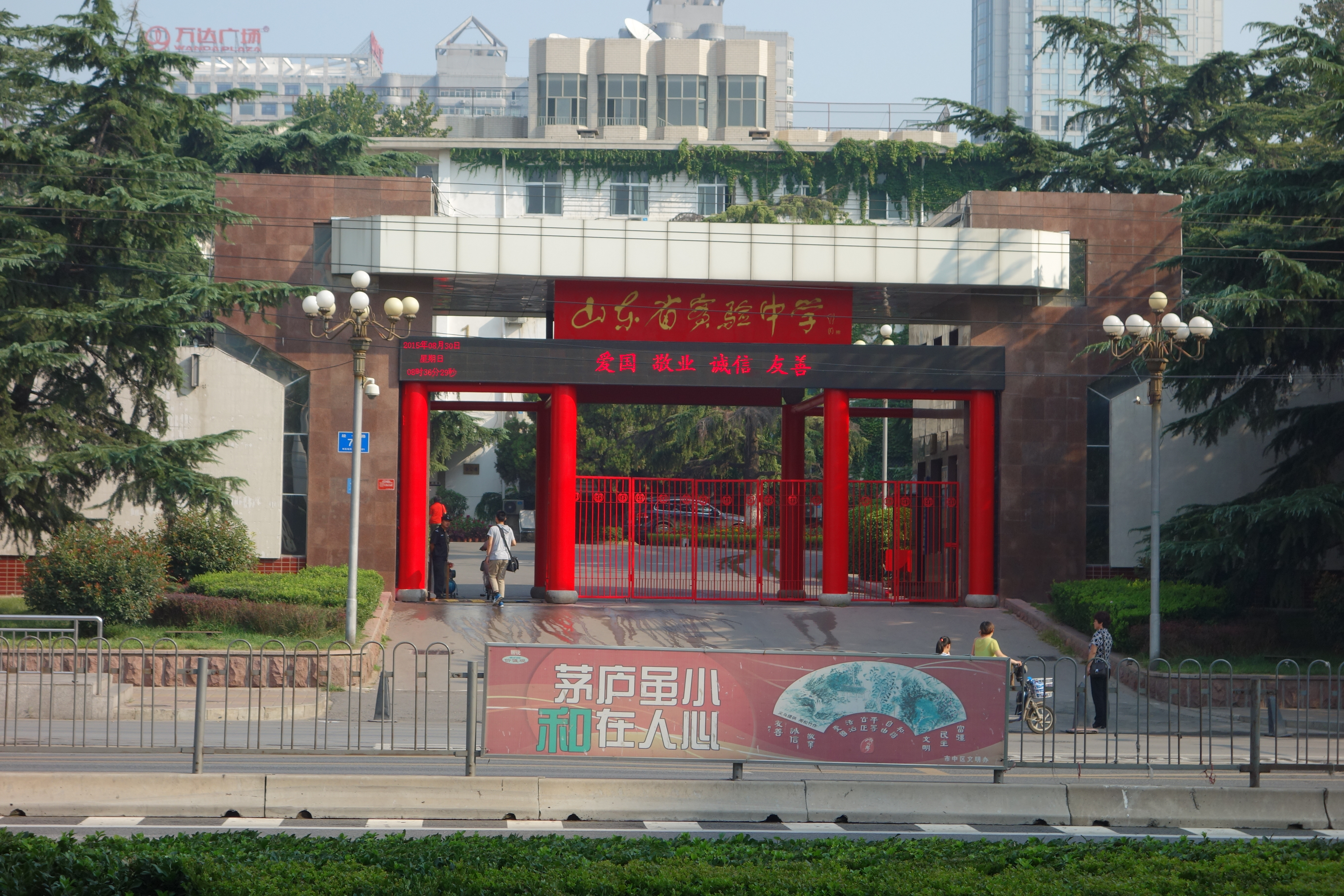
- The Main Gate of SEHS
- Location of the school Shizhong, Jinan, Shandong, 250100

Information
- Other name: 山东省实验中学
- Type: Public
- Motto: 博学日新，德行天下 (Be knowledgeable and virtuous)
- Established: 1948
- Principal: Fang Kuiming
- Staff: 570
- Grades: 10-12
- Enrollment: 5700
- Student Union/Association: 山东省实验中学学生会
- Color: Green Yellow
- Athletics: yes
- Website: sdshiyan.jinan.cn

Shandong Experimental High School (abbreviation: SEHS, Chinese: 山东省实验中学; pinyin: Shāndōngshěng Shíyàn Zhōngxué; Zhuyin Fuhao: ㄕㄢㄉㄨㄥㄕㄥˇㄕˊㄧㄢˋㄓㄨㄥㄒㄩㄝˊ) is a high school in Jinan, Shandong Province, China. Shandong Experimental High School is a provincial key high school, the first experimental high school, and founded in October 1948 in Jinan, the capital of Shandong. Since its foundation, it has carried out research on educational systems, curricula, teaching methodology, and educational administration. It has been ranked No.1 in the province and No. 14 nationally. Its students have won 16 gold medals, eight silver medals and three bronze medals in International Olympiads in math, physics, chemistry, and informatics etc. At present, the president of the school is Kuiming Fang (方奎明).

== Basics ==
Shandong Experimental Senior High School is one of the key provincial senior high schools and the first batch of standardized schools of Shandong Province. It was founded in October 1948 and now has four campuses, covering an area of 226 mu, with a total building area of more than 110,000 square meters. The school has more than 5,600 students and a staff of over 520. It possesses teaching buildings, laboratory buildings, office buildings, libraries, a stadium, an art building, an auditorium, dining halls and an athletic ground.

The school has one expert who receives an allowance from the State Council, two middle-aged and young experts who have contributed prominently to Shandong province, ten "teachers of special grade," six nationwide "excellent teachers," two famous teachers within Shandong province, eleven provincial teaching master-hands, nine municipal outstanding teachers, five well-known teachers in Jinan, and six teachers who have won first or second prize in the national high-quality class teaching competition, as well as over 40 teachers who have won first prize in the provincial high-quality competition. During the selection of "Ten Educational innovation figures", Shandong Experimental Senior High School is the only one in Shandong province to win all the three of headmaster, head teacher and teacher.

Shandong Experimental Senior High School educates its students in Chinese culture through activities such as bringing cross talk and Beijing Opera to the school, popularizing tai chi, and organizing Beijing Opera get-togethers. It has more than 30 associations and has expanded the students' international view through international exchange activities. The school has organized study tours all over the world and encourages the students to carry out public service work. The school's students have won sixteen gold medals, eight silver medals and three bronze medals in international course Olympiads and other sports and art competitions.

The school has been awarded advanced collective of the national educational system, the national green school, national school with traditional physical education events, provincial civilized unit, advanced primary Party organization of Shandong province, advanced unit of teachers' morality construction in Shandong Province, advanced unit of popularizing the knowledge of law in Shandong educational system, and sample school of management in accordance with law in Shandong Province.

== Teaching ==
The school encourages students to take part in competitions, such as International Olympic competitions in physics, chemistry, mathematics, geography, and biology as well as sports and games. Most of the students gain entry to universities, and many students gain entry to Chinese top universities every year. In 2000, experimental classes were set up with the purpose of enhancing high-level personal teaching of the most able students. There are now 10 experimental classes. Since 2001, special classes for the artistically talented have been incorporated into the syllabus. In 2001, eligibility for enrollment into the school was extended from citywide to province-wide.

The school has exchange visits with high schools in the United States, Britain, France, Japan, Australia, Hungary, South Korea, Singapore, Taiwan, and Germany.

== Timeline ==
- On October 10, 1948, the Ministry of Education and Education approved the establishment of the Jinan Special Municipal Second High School, which was formed by the merger of the former Jinan No. 1 and No. 2 Provincial High School.
- On October 18, 1948, Jinan Special Municipal Second Middle School (the predecessor of Shandong Provincial Experimental High School) officially opened for classes. The school is located at Xiaowei 4th Road, Jingliu Road.
- In November 1948, the former East China University (the predecessor of Shandong University) moved to Jinan from Linyi, and the school became the High School Affiliated to East China University.
- In November 1949, the former School of Education of East China University was designated as Shandong Normal University, and the affiliated middle school was handed over to the leaders of Jinan City, and was renamed Shandong Provincial Experimental High School.
- 1950–1956, "New China learns from the Soviet Union and takes the Soviet road". Since the school is the first experimental middle school in the country that uses new teaching materials and new methods, it is officially named "Shandong Experimental High School".
- In 1960, the school exchanged with the original No. 3 Middle School and moved to the current location, and later the No. 3 Middle School moved to Tai'an.
- From 1966 to 1976, due to the influence of Cultural Revolution, the Experimental Highschool was repudiated as "cultivating the seedlings of the bourgeoisie", so it was renamed "Jinan No. 22 High School".
- In 1976, the name of the school was restored as Shandong Experimental High School.
- In 2013, the West Campus (Jinan Xicheng Experimental High School) was established.
- In 2018, Jinan University Town Experimental Senior High School was incorporated into the Education Group.
- In 2019, Jinan Experimental Foreign Language School was incorporated into the Education Group and began to recruit students.
- In 2022, a subject teacher, Wang Lijun died suddenly largely attributed to the heavy mental pressure of teaching.
- In 2022, strict regulations targeting students in the school were implemented by the new presidents, Kuiming Fang, Chenglin Han, Haojun Yang, Tianyou Xu and Xiangyu Bao.
- In 2025, a chemical subject teacher, Yu Fengjuan, committed suicide by jumping off a teaching building in Main Campus. No official statement has been made by the university official so far.

== Campuses ==
=== Main campus ===
The gate of the main campus

It is situated on Jingshi Road in downtown Jinan. It's the oldest campus of the four campuses. It has 1-5# teaching buildings, a school library, a laboratory building, a gym and international department building; two basketball courts and a playground. The oldest using building is 1# teaching building, it's now used as an office for the important departments of school. The newest building is 5# teaching building, it has been used since September 2018. There are two gardens in the school, the eastern one called Qin Garden (沁园), the western has an Ascension Monument (登攀碑), names of the students who got international prize. Student have to go home every night for the little land.

=== Eastern campus ===
Eastern campus is in Guodian Third Block. It was set up in May 2001, covering a total area of 235 mu (15.7 ha [39 acres]) with a construction area of some 110,000 m^{2} (1,200,000 sq ft). There are 105 classes, and 502 teachers and staff in the school. Among the teaching staff are five special-class teachers, 144 senior teachers, 10 with master's degrees, 10 with M.Ed. certification, and 149 who have undertaken postgraduate courses. The school is equipped with playgrounds, gardens (including a zoology garden) and buildings for teaching, offices, a library, performance and display art, gyms, apartments, halls, and cafes. Eastern campus is moved to a new location in 2025.

=== Other campuses ===
West campus one is on Dezhou Road; Changqing campus is on Wate Road.

Quehua campus is constructed in the north across the Yellow River.

== Presidents ==
Name		Term	
Wang Datong	王大彤	1948.10	1951.9
Ninghange	寧漢戈	1951.9	1954.4
Han Yang	韓陽	1954.4	1959.3
Wang Ming	王明	1959.3	1960.5
Du Lizhou	杜黎州	1960.8	1968.10
Cui Weilin	崔惟琳	1975.6	1981.10
Li Yong	李墉	1979.5	1980.12
Li Li	李力	1980.12	1986.12
Han Chang	韓常	1986.12	1999
Liu Kun	劉堃	1999	2010
Wang Pinmu	王品木	2010	2016
Han Xianghe	韓相河	2016	2022
Fang Kuiming	方奎明	2022	

== Notable alumni ==
- Li Guoan, deputy to the 11th National People's Congress, researcher of the Institute of New Materials of Shandong Academy of Sciences, former deputy to the 10th National People's Congress, member of the Standing Committee of the 8th Provincial Committee of the Chinese People's Political Consultative Conference, class of 1960
- Cong Rigang Deputy Director of the Military Science and Technology Committee of the General Armament Department, Lieutenant General, class of 1965
- Yin Li, Communist Party Secretary of Beijing, member of the Politburo of CCP, former head of Fujian and Sichuan, class of 1980
- Zhang Lu, deputy director of the English Division of the Translation Office of the Ministry of Foreign Affairs, Chief Translator of Hu Jintao and Wen Jiabao, class of 1996
- Zhang Yueran, writer, class of 2001
- Du Jiang, actor, class of 2004
- Cai Haoyu, CEO and co-founder of MiHoYo, class of 2005
- Wang Jingyao, model and beauty pageant titleholder, class of 2008
- Zhang Ziyu, basketball player

== Sister Schools ==
- Holbein-Gymnasium, Augsburg, Germany
- Naga Senior High School, Iwade, Japan
- Daeyoung High School, Seoul, South Korea
- Chung-Hsin High School, Hsinchu, Taiwan
- Housatonic Valley Regional High School, Falls Village, Connecticut, United States
