= Honkai: Nexus Anima =

Upcoming video game

- Developer: miHoYo
- Publishers: CHN: miHoYo; WW: HoYoverse
- Series: Honkai
- Platforms: Android; iOS; Windows
- Release: Spring 2027
- Genres: Auto battler, Adventure, Role-playing
- Mode: Single-player

Honkai: Nexus Anima (Chinese: 崩坏：因缘精灵; pinyin: Bēnghuài: Yīnyuán Jīnglíng) is an upcoming creature-collector adventure strategy game developed and published by miHoYo. The fifth installment in the Honkai series, it utilizes some characters from Honkai Impact 3rd and Honkai: Star Rail, and is planned to release on Android, iOS and PC.

== Premise ==
The game is set in a world managed by the balance of Nexus, unseen bonds woven between paired concepts such as love and hate. When these bonds are severed, they scatter their power in the form of creatures named Anima. Players control a traveler embarking on an adventure to forge bonds with Anima.

== Development and release ==
Honkai: Nexus Anima is developed and published by Chinese company miHoYo. The game's existence was first confirmed in 2024 as one of the five prototypes in process of research and development. Trademark application and media account registration for Honkai: Nexus Anima were discovered in April 2025. The game was later revealed through an easter egg trailer in Star Rail LIVE 2025, an event celebrating the anniversary of Honkai: Star Rail. The game was officially announced in August 2025.

The first closed beta test opened for application in August 2025, dubbed as the "Nexus Bond Test". The second closed beta test, dubbed the "Evolution Test", began on July 9, 2026, for Android, iOS and PC. The last beta test will began on November 25, 2026. The game is set to be released in spring 2027.

== Reception ==
Pre-release reception of the game largely compared it to Pokémon. Siliconera editor Jenni Lada praised the game's combat and character personalization. She also complimented the fact that players can change their avatar's attributes via an allocation system, saying that it "isn't common in this genre."
