= SEHS =

SEHS may refer to:

- St. Edmond High School (Fort Dodge, Iowa), United States
- St. Edmund High School (Eunice, Louisiana), United States
- St. Edward High School (Lakewood, Ohio), United States
- St. Edward's High School, Austin, Texas, United States
- St. Elizabeth High School (Oakland, California), United States
- St. Elizabeth High School (Wilmington, Delaware), United States
- Sachem East High School, Farmingville, New York, United States
- Salisbury East High School, Salisbury East, South Australia, Australia
- Seneca East High School, Attica, Ohio, United States
- Sherburne-Earlville High School, part of the Sherburne-Earlville Central School, Sherburne, New York, United States
- South-Eastern High speed
- South Effingham High School, Guyton, Georgia, United States
- South Elgin High School, South Elgin, Illinois, United States
- South End Historical Society, Boston, Massachusetts, United States
- South Eugene High School, Eugene, Oregon, United States
- Southeast Guilford High School, Greensboro, North Carolina, United States
- Stanhope Elmore High School, Millbrook, Alabama
- Southeast High School, Wichita, Kansas
- Shandong Experimental High School, Jinan, China
