= Liu Wei (businessman, born 1987) =

Chinese entrepreneur and video game producer (born 1987)

- 刘伟
- Born: 8 March 1987 (age 39); Ningxiang, Changsha, Hunan, China
- Other names: Forrest Liu; Da Wei
- Education: Shanghai Jiao Tong University (BSc., MSc.); Georgia Tech (MSc.)
- Occupations: President & Chairman of miHoYo

Chinese name
- Traditional Chinese: 劉偉
- Simplified Chinese: 刘伟
Transcriptions
Standard Mandarin
- Hanyu Pinyin: Liú Wěi
Yue: Cantonese
- Jyutping: Lau^{4} Wai^{5}

Liu Wei (Chinese: 刘伟; pinyin: Liú Wěi; born 8 March 1987), also known as Forrest Liu, as well as Da Wei within the gaming community, is a Chinese businessman and video game producer. He is best known as the co-founder and president of the video game company miHoYo.

== Early life ==
Liu was born in Ningxiang, Changsha, Hunan in 1987. Liu attended Ningxiang No. 1 High School for his secondary education. He completed his undergraduate studies at Shanghai Jiao Tong University, where he later pursued a master's degree in electronic engineering. Additionally, he obtained a master's degree in electrical and computer engineering from Georgia Tech. During his university years, Liu was introverted, but his personality changed after he became the student council president. His experience in the student council also helped him in his future entrepreneurial and managerial roles. While in graduate school, Liu and three other students from the same university developed an open-source literary community project focused on free writing, which won an award at the Chinese Academy of Sciences' Science and Technology Innovation Competition. The team later developed the game engine "Misato."

== Career ==
After graduation, Liu, together with his college roommates Cai Haoyu and Luo Yuhao, decided to start a game company and founded miHoYo. The team's original goal was to fill the gap in the domestic anime culture and create a doujin game brand. In the early days, the company received almost no external financing until 2014, when it developed thanks to the success of Guns Girl Z. Liu currently owns a 22.6 percent stake of miHoYo, and is the company's second-largest shareholder.

In December 2020, Liu was appointed as a non-executive director and a member of the Strategic Development Committee of XD Inc. In July 2022, Liu took on the role of part-time vice president of the Shanghai Federation of Industry and Commerce. In 2023, Liu was awarded the "National May 1st Labor Medal" by the All-China Federation of Trade Unions. In September of the same year, Cai Haoyu stepped down as the legal representative and chairman of miHoYo, and Liu took over the positions. At the same time, Liu resigned as the chairman and legal representative of several miHoYo subsidiaries. In December 2023, Liu resigned from his positions at XD Inc.

== Depictions in media ==
In the early days of entrepreneurship of miHoYo, Liu had to wear many hats and tried all kinds of work except for art designer. Among these roles, his work in customer service allowed him to interact and engage with players in the gaming community, earning him the nickname "Da Wei" (Chinese: 大伟哥; lit. 'Brother Big Wei') from players. Back then, the miHoYo team did not spend much effort on formal marketing but promoted their games through interactions with fans. During community events, the most popular design created by fans for him was a bald character with no distinct features and the character "Wei" written on his face. Liu later appeared in various media activities as the character Da Wei and even appeared as a game character in Guns Girl Z. In Genshin Impact, he appeared as a character named "Unusual Hilichurl," which was based on the game's monster class "Hilichurl."
