= HomDGCat =

Chinese game creator (born 2004)

- Born: 周佳诺 (Zhou Jianuo); May 2004 (age 22)
- Other name: 妮可少女 (Níkě Shaònǚ)
- Education: University of Science and Technology of China (B.S.); Georgia Institute of Technology (Doctoral candidate)

Zhou Jianuo (Chinese: 周佳诺; pinyin: Zhōu Jiānuò), known online as HomDGCat, is a miHoYo game content creator and the webmaster of game database Yuheng Cup.

In February 2026, Zhou was sued by miHoYo in a court in the U.S. state of Georgia, alleging that he has engaged in a sustained, coordinated campaign to steal and publicly disseminate miHoYo's confidential, trade secret information and copyrighted materials related to Genshin Impact and Honkai: Star Rail. In the same month, Zhou was arrested in Shanghai for suspected copyright infringement.

== Education ==
Jianuo Zhou was born in May 2004. His father, who held a master's degree from Tsinghua University, came from Dazhou Village (大周村) in Leizhou City, Zhanjiang Prefecture, Guangdong. Jianuo Zhou was raised in Russia while his father was stationed in the country as a diplomat. While in Russia, Zhou self-studied Chinese and returned to China in 2018 at the age of 14. He was later admitted to the Special Class for the Gifted Young in the University of Science and Technology of China. After finishing his undergraduate degree, Zhou moved to the United States in 2022 to pursue his PhD in mathematics at the Georgia Institute of Technology. At the time of his arrest in February 2026, he had not yet completed the degree.

== Yuheng Cup database and leaking ==
In April 2022, Zhou started the Yuheng Cup, which initially was a speed contest for Genshin Impact. While in the U.S., Zhou created the Yuheng Cup website which contains databases of miHoYo games including Genshin Impact and Honkai: Star Rail. In addition to the website, Zhou also leaked unrevealed content of the miHoYo games through the HomDGCat Telegram channel. Media described HomDGCat as "a famous leaker" of the games.

In February 2026, Zhou was sued by miHoYo via its global publishing brand Cognosphere in the United States District Court for the Northern District of Georgia. According to the lawsuit, miHoYo alleged that Zhou published and disseminated thousands of entries of unreleased content from the Cognosphere games. In the same month, police in Shanghai announced they have arrested 3 suspects, including Zhou, for copyright violations and soliciting donations by cracking miHoYo game files and distributing the information through platforms. "We were just enthusiasts. We thought it would be fine as long as we deleted the files after warning", Zhou was quoted by media in response to the arrest.

Zhou was able to obtain unreleased content by asking participants in miHoYo's beta testing program to breach their non-disclosure agreement and confidentiality obligations by giving access to the beta packages to Zhou. It was reported that miHoYo issued multiple takedown requests to Zhou regarding the leaked material, but Zhou disagreed with the claims.
