= Honkai =

Chinese video game franchise

- Genres: Platform, (FlyMe2TheMoon) Role-playing
- Developer: miHoYo
- Publishers: CHN: miHoYo; WW: HoYoverse
- Creators: David Jiang; Cai Haoyu; CiCi (Zhang Qinghua)
- Writers: Ling Yi (Guns Girl Z); Manager Zhou (Guns Girl Z); Egg (Guns Girl Z); Ai Er (Guns Girl Z); Shaoji (Honkai Impact 3rd and Honkai: Star Rail); Fanchuan (Honkai Impact 3rd and Honkai: Star Rail)
- Composer: HOYO-MiX
- Platforms: iOS; Android; PC; PlayStation 4; PlayStation 5
- First release: FlyMe2theMoon; 28 September 2011
- Latest release: Honkai: Star Rail; 26 April 2023

Honkai (/ˈhɔːnˌkaɪ/, Chinese: 崩坏; pinyin: Bēnghuài; lit. 'Collapse', 'Deteriorate') is a video game series and media franchise developed by miHoYo, published by miHoYo in mainland China and worldwide by Cognosphere (trading as HoYoverse). Initially led by Cai Haoyu, David Jiang took over as the series producer as of present.

The series originates with FlyMe2theMoon, a paid mobile game for iOS released in 2011, which was developed by the five-person "miHoYo studio" startup team. (Note: The "miHoYo studio" startup team consisted of Cai Haoyu, Liu Wei, Luo Yuhao, Jin Zhicheng, and Zhang Qinghua. Jin Zhicheng left "miHoYo studio" afterward, before the founding of miHoYo as a company.) The first installment of the Honkai series was Zombiegal Kawaii released in 2012. The series has seen several more games since, with the most recent main entry being 2023's Honkai: Star Rail.

The Honkai series is set in a universe called the "Imaginary Tree" and follows the adventures of characters such as Kiana, Mei, and Bronya. While the series features recurring characters such as Kiana, each installment has different backgrounds and character settings and can be considered as stories that take place in different worlds in the same universe without absolute connectivity. The series primarily revolves around the theme of "rebellion against the end and saving the world" and features "Honkai" disasters as the core setting.

== Common elements ==
=== Plot and themes ===
The "Honkai," a term coined within the Honkai series, is the core concept and foundation of the Honkai universe. It is an interdimensional alien force with a certain level of intelligence and various emanations whose goal is to assimilate developed civilizations through any means. The Honkai can be spread as energy, through beasts and humans, causing them various symptoms, and can also trigger viruses, natural disasters, world wars, or any other form of damage to civilisation. The highest manifestation of the Honkai is a "Herrscher," which are emanations of the Honkai with powerful specialized abilities and will. Whenever civilization arises, the Honkai will appear, and the strength of the Honkai is always proportional to the degree of human civilisation in that region. Worlds devoured by the Honkai will fall from the Imaginary Tree and enter the Sea of Quanta, becoming "bubble universes" that gradually disappear. The English term "Honkai" is a coined word that specifically refers to the "Honkai" disaster, which intentionally avoids using Hepburn (Hōkai) or kana spelling (Houkai) of the Japanese word 崩壊 due to proprietary naming considerations.

In order to connect multiple Honkai games to build one "Honkai Universe," the "Imaginary Tree" and "Sea of Quanta" are brought up by Honkai Impact 3rd as the multiple universe settings in the Honkai series. The maximum scale of the Honkai universe is the Sea of Quanta, in which the Imaginary Tree is located and multiple worlds are born. The worlds on the Imaginary Tree are stable and follow the rules of history and time, developing in chronological order, with a linear structure of history. On the other hand, the Sea of Quanta can form "bubble universes" during natural fluctuations, which are unstable and lack complete history, only having fragments of time periods in specific regions. In this multiverse, the Imaginary Tree and the Sea of Quanta have a long-standing rivalry. The Imaginary Tree seeks to absorb the Sea, while the Sea seeks to drown the Tree. To facilitate this cycle, worlds are like leaves growing on the Tree, and when they fail to persist, they fall from the Tree into the Sea and become fragmented versions of themselves, known as bubble universes, some of which have more stability than others. This multiple universe setting is followed in all the Honkai series games. Genshin Impact is also often considered as one of the parallel worlds on the Imaginary Tree and shares the same universe as the Honkai series. Besides Genshin Impact, Tears of Themis's universe is also hinted to be connected via Imaginary Tree.

=== Characters ===
Kiana Kaslana, who first appeared in FlyMe2theMoon, is the first and foremost character designed by miHoYo and the protagonist of multiple works in the Honkai series. Mei and Bronya, who first appeared in Zombiegal Kawaii, formed the trio protagonists with Kiana and are the core characters of the Honkai series. The plot of Guns Girl Z continues the story of Zombiegal Kawaii, and after the conclusion of the "Retrace" arc, the new chapters "Inheritance" and "Rebirth" begin to use a parallel world setting to tell new stories with existing characters. Honkai Impact 3rd continues the approach of Guns Girl Z by introducing the main characters of the previous game with new personalities and designs. Honkai: Star Rail also follows this tradition and features well-known characters from the Honkai series, such as Bronya, Himeko, and Welt Yang.

While every game in the Honkai series is considered a "spiritual sequel" of its predecessor, many share similar characters within the series. The practice of miHoYo adopting the character designs but endowing them with entirely new personalities and character settings is often referred to as "expy" (unofficial term) (Japanese: 同位体, "isotope"). In an interview with Den Fami Nico Gamer, the writing team explains that the concept of "expy" is the most effective way to demonstrate connections within the series. Through this technique, fans can observe how a single character can explore different possibilities across parallel worlds while each work maintains its own independent identity. Genshin Impact, another game developed by miHoYo, also heavily borrows the character designs of the Honkai series, and is thus considered by fans to be a spin-off of the Honkai series. This was confirmed by CEO Cai Haoyu in 2021, who named the Honkai Universe as one of the primary reasons for Genshin Impact's development. Some character names in Genshin Impact are similar to those in the Honkai series but not exactly the same, and the Chinese and Japanese voice actors are the same as in the Honkai series. For example, the character Raiden Shogun in Genshin Impact mirrors Raiden Mei in the Honkai series, though their personalities differ significantly. Both the Chinese and Japanese voice actors for the two characters are the same: Juhuahua for Chinese and Miyuki Sawashiro for Japanese.

=== Gameplay ===
Apart from many elements present in games that emphasize on elemental strengths and weaknesses, two unique elements are shared in the Honkai series, namely Imaginary and Quantum.

Like most RPGs, the Honkai series use an experience level system for character advancement, in which experience points are accumulated by killing enemies. Certain materials can be used to speed up the character advancement. Level caps on certain levels for each character are placed, and players need to do ascension quests or submit materials to ascend further.

== History ==
Release timeline Main titles in bold
2011	FlyMe2theMoon
2012	**Zombiegal Kawaii**
2013
2014	**Guns Girl Z**
2015
2016	**Honkai Impact 3rd**
2017
2018
2019
2020
2021
2022
2023	Honkai: Star Rail
2024
2025
TBA	Honkai: Nexus Anima

=== Origin ===
The Honkai series began with the release of FlyMe2theMoon, a 2D side-scrolling paid game. FlyMe2theMoon is the first-ever game in the Honkai series, developed and released as an independent game by "miHoYo Studio" before the establishment of miHoYo company. On 28 September 2011, miHoYo released FlyMe2theMoon, a paid game priced at 18 Chinese yuan, on the App Store as an independent developer. FlyMe2theMoon is a 2D side-scrolling game with 60 levels across four game modes, including exploration, puzzle solving, racing, and survival. The game's story follows Kiana Kaslana, a genius witch, as she travels to the Lunar Ruins to uncover the truth about her past after completing the Mage's brutal trials. The game's title and theme are inspired by the anime Neon Genesis Evangelion's ending song "Fly Me to the Moon." FlyMe2theMoon was developed using the Cocos2d software and the Box2D physics engine. The game's main theme song, Moon Trip, was composed by Yu Jianliu, with lyrics by Lemonjolly and performed by the VOCALOID software Hatsune Miku.

=== Main series ===
Zombiegal Kawaii, also localised as Houkai Gakuen, is the first installment of the Honkai series. Although the miHoYo startup team received little financial success on FlyMe2theMoon, they eventually got an angel investment of 1 million yuan from Skye. To spend the investment funds, miHoYo began developing Zombiegal Kawaii in December 2011, releasing on the iOS platform in December 2012 as a paid single-player game. Influenced by the 2D side-scrolling shooter game Zombie Town and the Japanese anime Highschool of the Dead, the game is set in a world undergoing a zombie invasion, known as "Houkai," which later became the name of the series. The game's protagonist, Kiana Kaslana, was directly borrowed from FlyMe2theMoon, and she eventually became one of the core character of the Honkai series. The project began in December 2011 and underwent four to five iterations within three months. The game was developed using the Unity engine and Maya graphic software, and the values were fine-tuned and the systems improved for eight months. The game was released in version 1.0 in November 2012 and entered public testing in December of that year. Zombiegal Kawaii is an action game set in a school campus in the near future. The protagonist, Kiana, fights against zombies using various weapons in the besieged campus.

Guns Girl Z, also localised as Houkai Gakuen 2, is the second installment of the Honkai series, inheriting data, code, and art design from Zombiegal Kawaii. Guns Girl Z was initiated in June 2013. Comparing with Zombiegal Kawaii, the biggest change was from a paid game to a free-to-play game with live service business model. The game's core gameplay is inspired by Puzzle & Dragons. Guns Girl Z adds new characters, weapons, and costumes that were not present in Zombiegal Kawaii. miHoYo started designing the server architecture in August and began the art design and system development in November. The development was faster than the original due to inheriting a large amount of data, code, and art assets from Zombiegal Kawaii. The game released on 26 January 2014, becoming miHoYo's first successful commercial game. On 6 July, Cai Haoyu shared his experience in developing and promoting Guns Girl Z at the GameLook Open Day in Shanghai. The concept of the "Honkai Universe" was also proposed during this period.

Honkai Impact 3rd is an action role-playing game developed by miHoYo, based on the manga spin-off Honkai Impact 3rd. Honkai Impact 3rd was initiated in June 2014. Starting in March 2015, miHoYo began developing the 3D game engine for Honkai Impact 3rd. They developed a physics-based animation system that could simulate different materials using physical calculations, presenting more realistic character movements and destructive scene effects. It can also correct abrupt transitions between animations, making the animations smoother and more natural. In addition, miHoYo developed its technologies for 3D modeling, light mapping, and real-time and pre-rendering systems. Content production for the game began in October of the same year. During the development process, since no member on the team knew how to do 3D projects, transitioning from 2D to 3D was a challenge. Creating the artwork, model, and animation of Kiana Kaslana took six months. After a test run, the team discarded the work and restarted from scratch to establish the current system. It was first released for iOS in March 2016 and entered open beta in September of the same year. The game was released in October 2016.

Honkai Impact 3rd is set in a post-apocalyptic world, where players can take on the role of various Valkyries and fight against enemies using a variety of weapons and skills. The game features characters from the previous game, including Kiana Kaslana, Raiden Mei, and Bronya Zaychik. In addition to the game itself, Honkai Impact 3rd also has an anime series, visual novels, manga, and live-action promotional materials. It has gained a following worldwide since its release. After being released in mainland China for several months, the game was launched in Japan on 22 February 2017, Taiwan on 18 May 2017, Southeast Asia on 1 November 2017, and North America and Europe on 28 March 2018. A PC version was released on 26 December 2019.

=== Spin-offs ===
On 15 February 2017, miHoYo filed for an initial public offering (IPO) to the China Securities Regulatory Commission when the company was planning to raise over a billion CNY. During the process, several concerns were under attention, including the company's dependence on a single intellectual property, the Honkai series. The main source of miHoYo's revenue was Guns Girl Z, accounting for 96.34%. The risk is that the company may not be able to continue to launch new products to meet the needs of players or update the content of their games, and they could face the loss of users. Another issue is that the company might fail to grasp changes in preferences, and the Honkai series loses appeal. On 19 December, miHoYo submitted an updated prospectus that included Honkai Impact 3rd in its revenue, accounting for 98.82% with Guns Girl Z, which did not help much in the situation. Instead, miHoYo renamed the project Honkai 4th, also named Honkai: Chronicles and initialized in January 2017, (Note: There were two upcoming game projects listed in the IPO prospectus, and one of which was named Honkai: Chronicles (崩坏-编年史). Later, miHoYo registered several trademarks under the name of Honkai: Chronicles, including the "Knights of Schicksal" that are rumored to be the prototype of the Knights of Favonius in Genshin Impact.) to Genshin Impact, which is no longer a title in the Honkai series. miHoYo withdrew its IPO application in 2020. Although not part of the Honkai series, Genshin Impact is often considered a spin-off of the series, with similar character design and was confirmed to be set in the same multiverse as the Honkai series.

In November 2018, another Honkai 4th project, originally named Honkai 4th: Galaxy, was initiated. Later, the game was reinitiated in 2019 as Honkai: Star Rail, with the plan being a lighter live service game, intending to run for at least six years after launch. Since the setting of the previous game Honkai Impact 3rd was Earth, and other planets were mentioned in the storyline, the production team decided to set Honkai: Star Rail in the "universe." Honkai: Star Rail is a turn-based role-playing game set in a galaxy of the Honkai universe. Players play as the Trailblazer, a mysterious amnesiac possessing within them a Stellaron, a world-ending catalyst given by the Aeon Nanook. To find their purpose, the Trailblazer joins the crew of the "Astral Express" to follow the path of the deceased Aeon Akivili, and to help and connect the worlds raptured by the Stellaron incidents by Nanook, while encountering various friendly and opposing factions, including the Stellaron Hunters, who has an interest in the Trailblazer's journey. Due to player feedback about the high difficulty of Honkai Impact 3rd, the team decided to focus more on strategy for Honkai: Star Rail, lowering the difficulty and barrier to entry, creating a "playable anime." Honkai: Star Rail was globally launched on 26 April 2023.

=== Sequels and expansions ===
After the completion of Guns Girl Z's main story "Retrospect Chapter," the game continued to update with new storylines in the form of side story chapters such as "Reborn Chapter."

A massive expansion of Honkai Impact 3rd, titled "Honkai Impact 3rd Part 2" was released on 29 February 2024. Built upon the existing game, the update marks the start of the second major story arc of the game, with new characters, reworked UI, an updated engine, and a shift from a mission-based structure to a limited open-world structure similar to Honkai: Star Rail.

== Development ==
=== Writing ===
Currently, the writing team for the Honkai series consists of dozens of people. Rather than having each project create independently, the conceptualization, setting, and creation of the entire Honkai series is carried out within a higher-level "IP team."

Shaoji is the main writer for Honkai Impact 3rd's main story chapters including "Final Lesson," "Elysian Realm," and "Everlasting Flames." During the preview livestream of Honkai: Star Rail version 2.0, Shaoji appeared as a program guest and revealed his new role as a narrative designer for the entire Honkai series, and he is also the main writer for the Penacony chapter in Honkai: Star Rail's main story. In an interview with Den Fami Nico Gamer, Shaoji stated that the Honkai series' storylines are built around modern pop culture. Therefore, they first consider "what problems and difficulties people face in reality today," assign these issues to various characters, and show different characters' understanding of these problems through the story. Based on this foundation, the story ultimately reaches a conclusion that is more romantic, positive, and idealistic than reality, allowing players to resonate with the story. Shaoji expressed that his creative starting point is to share a feeling of "shared experiences and mutual companionship" with players through stories, hoping that players can gain beautiful and valuable memories after playing. He stated that the theme of the Honkai series is "humanistic care," where through various "anthems of humanity" stories, players can discover the beauty of life and find courage and warmth. The writing team hopes to pass on this "flame of human civilization" to more people.

=== Art design ===
The lead artist for the Honkai series is CiCi (Zhang Qinghua), who is also the art director at miHoYo. During the development of FlyMe2theMoon, miHoYo discovered CiCi, then a senior student majoring in animation at Guangdong University of Technology, through social media. He was invited to join miHoYo and became the lead artist. CiCi's first character design was for the protagonist Kiana in FlyMe2theMoon, who is the prototype for the main character Kiana Kaslana in the Honkai series. As the only artist in the startup team, he designed almost all of miHoYo's early art.

In terms of character design, Game Daily summarizes the art design of the Honkai series as "amplifying character traits," which means strengthening the characteristics of characters through various forms of expression, such as character portraits, skill effects, and trailers, to make a lasting impression on players about the characters' appearances. The goal is to make all kinds of characters seem "as if they truly live in the game world," in harmony with other materials including the plot and lore bits. Regarding scene art, the art designers of Honkai: Star Rail stated that industrializing the game's sticker work is part of miHoYo's "industrialization" goal, and the pursuit of perfection in art effects and performance is to provide the best gaming experience for players. As for the design of promotional videos, miHoYo's trailer designers said that in addition to the pursuit of beauty in art design itself, promotional videos also need to "convey information and share emotions" to create an appropriate and immersive worldview.

=== Music ===
The music for the Honkai series is composed by several composers from HOYO-MiX. In 2011, miHoYo acquired the rights to Gradually Collapsing Hatsune Miku (Note: Also known as Honkai World Diva) and subsequently, composers Cai Jinhan, Zheng Xiaoyu, and Xia Yihan joined miHoYo and co-founded the HOYO-MiX studio to create soundtracks for miHoYo's games. Cai Jinhan serves as the principal of HOYO-MiX and also as the music director at miHoYo. Later, HOYO-MiX recruited composers such as Gong Qi, Wen Chi, and Lin Yifan to create original soundtrack music for all works in the Honkai series. The first original soundtrack album of the Honkai series, Honkai World Diva - Guns Girl Z OST, was released on 11 November 2014. Since 2017, HOYO-MiX has continued to collaborate with several well-known singers, with the first collaboration being with Japanese pianist and singer Mika Kobayashi to release singles such as Girl Inside and Honkai World Diva. Just half a month after release, Girl Inside entered the NetEase Cloud Music chart at top 6, and Honkai World Diva also entered the top 10.

=== Localisation ===
In an interview by Play magazine, HoYoverse explained the unique challenges encountered in the English localisation of Honkai: Star Rail. The localisation process involves creatively translating cultural and pop culture references, especially those deeply rooted in Chinese society and language. To make the game accessible to English-speaking players, HoYoverse adapts Chinese idioms, memes, and references. For instance, an in-game achievement paying tribute to a Jay Chou song All the Way North was renamed "Sweet Pom-Pom O'Mine" as a nod to Guns N' Roses. The game also features Classical Chinese elements, which are meticulously translated to maintain their essence.

== Reception ==
Aggregate review scores
Game	Year	Metacritic
Honkai: Star Rail	2023	80/100

The Honkai series of games has received recognition from both the market and players. Guns Girl Z won awards such as the "2014 Best 2D Online Game Golden Peng Award" and the "Most Popular Online Mobile Game Award." As of 30 June 2017, Guns Girl Z's cumulative revenue from in-game purchases exceeded 1 billion yuan. Honkai Impact 3rd received Apple's homepage recommendation on the App Store the next day after release. Honkai Impact 3rd also garnered accolades from China's Mobile Hardcore Alliance, winning the "Top 10 Popular Games" and the "2016 Best 2D Online Game Golden Peng Award." As of 30 June 2017, Honkai Impact 3rd had over 22 million registered accounts and accumulated revenue exceeding 1.1 billion yuan.

Honkai: Star Rail had 22.98 million pre-registered players in mainland China and 10 million outside China during its pre-release period. On 23 April 2023, Honkai: Star Rail topped the free charts in over 113 countries and regions on the App Store, and topped the grossing charts in mainland China, the United States, Japan, and South Korea. After its global launch on 26 April, the game reached the top spot on the App Store bestseller list in mainland China within 5 hours, and it ranked in the top ten in other 42 countries. miHoYo announced that the game's downloads had exceeded 20 million by 28 April. GameLook estimates that Honkai: Star Rail's global revenue on its launch day likely exceeded 100 million yuan. According to Sensor Tower, the mobile version of Honkai: Star Rail generated over 100 million USD in global revenue within 10 days, with China accounting for 44%, Japan for 22%, and the United States for 12%. DataEye statistics show that within 15 days of its launch, the iOS version and the Android version (downloaded via Google Play) had already generated at least US$65 million in revenue, with Japanese revenue reaching 120 million yuan.

According to the review aggregator website Metacritic, Honkai: Star Rail has received predominantly positive reviews. Another review aggregator, OpenCritic, compiled 20 review articles, with 88% being positive. Jess Reyes from IGN referred to it as the best free-to-play game of 2023.
