= Varsapura =

Upcoming video game

- Developer: miHoYo
- Publishers: CHN: miHoYo; WW: HoYoverse
- Producer: Cai Haoyu
- Engine: Unreal Engine 5
- Release: TBA
- Genres: Open world, role-playing
- Mode: Single-player

Varsapura (Note: Chinese: 雨雾之都; pinyin: Yǔwù zhī Dū; lit. 'City of Rain and Mist') is an upcoming open-world role-playing video game developed and published by miHoYo. Set in a metropolis infused with supernatural elements, the game is produced by miHoYo co-founder Cai Haoyu.

== Setting ==
Varsapura is an open-world role-playing video game set in a city characterized by supernatural phenomena. Varsapura translates to "Rain City" from the Sanskrit words varṣā (rain) and pura (city or town). The name is a linguistic blend on singa (lion) and pura, the Sanskrit root for Singapore meaning "Lion City."

The gameplay trailer shows the protagonist, "Hollowone," completing an assessment to join a mysterious organization known as the Supernatural Enforcement and Administration League (SEAL), driving through the city with another character, Sayuki, and entering an “inner world” to battle monstrous enemies. In the trailer, the protagonist wields an umbrella-shaped weapon while Sayuki fights using stacks of documents. Players can switch between characters and employ stealth mechanics to assassinate enemies. The trailer's description also notes that the protagonist's appearance will vary based on each player's preferences.

== Development and release ==
The game is produced by miHoYo co-founder Cai Haoyu, with development contributions from teams in Shanghai, Singapore, Los Angeles, Montreal, and other regions. Unlike previous miHoYo titles, Varsapura adopts a more realistic visual style, though character faces retain anime-inspired features. The city environments are primarily modeled on Singapore's city streets as well as some skyscrapers of Shanghai, while the character designs take inspiration not from miHoYo's typical cel-shaded aesthetic but from the visual style of the company's virtual streamer Lumi. Varsapura is also miHoYo's first game developed using Unreal Engine 5.

On 21 November 2025, miHoYo published a 31-minute gameplay video, showing its exploration and battle system with three playable characters. A specific release date has not yet been announced.

== Reception ==
=== Pre-release ===
Kotaku's Ethan Gach described the game as resembling a psychological thriller more than a traditional fantasy or science-fiction title. Austin Wood of GamesRadar+ wrote that although the game maintains an anime-influenced look, it is "smoother and more subdued," and that compared with the "sprawling chaos" of Ananta, Varsapura presents a more "focused" gameplay experience. PC Gamer's Mollie Taylor praised the combat system and supernatural mystery elements but criticized the character faces as "cheap" and "plasticky," arguing that giving a realistically proportioned female character "a pair of giant twinkling eyes" creates a weird juxtaposition. All three reviewers noted visual similarities between Varsapura and Control.
