= Petit Planet =

Upcoming video game

- Developer: miHoYo
- Publishers: CN: miHoYo; WW: HoYoverse
- Platforms: Android; iOS; Nintendo Switch 2; Windows
- Release: Android, iOS, Windows; December 4, 2026; Nintendo Switch 2; 2027
- Genres: Cozy game Life simulation

Petit Planet (Note: Chinese: 星布谷地; pinyin: Xīngbù Gǔdì; lit. 'Star-Scattered Valley') is an upcoming life simulation game by miHoYo.

== Story ==
Petit Planet involves the player, who works for Loomi Co., accompanied by three anthropomorphic animals, with the objective of developing a small planetoid and traversing the galaxy around it.

== Gameplay ==
Petit Planet has full character customization. It involves completing tasks to unlock more customization options. The game takes place in real time, and certain goals need multiple days to complete.

== Development ==
Petit Planet was first announced on September 25, 2025. The game held its first closed beta test, known as the "Coziness Test", on November 7, 2025. A second closed beta test, known as the "Stardrift Test", was held on April 21, 2026. On August 25, 2026, during the annual Gamescom event, a new trailer for Petit Planet revealed that the game will be releasing in winter that same year. Petit Planet would also announce its final beta test, which was held on September 20. The game will be released for PC, iOS and Android, with a Nintendo Switch 2 version releasing in 2027 and additional platforms in development.
