= Honkai Impact 3rd =

2016 action role-playing game

- Developer: miHoYo
- Publishers: CHN: miHoYo; TWN/HKG/MAC: Nijigen Games; VNM: Funtap; WW: HoYoverse
- Producers: Cai Haoyu (2014–2017); David Jiang (?–present)
- Composers: HOYO-MiX: Cai Jinhan; Chen Yonghui; Cui Wei; Gong Qi; Jiang Peng; Li Jinghao; Lin Yifan; Wen Chi; Zheng Yujie
- Series: Honkai
- Engine: Unity
- Platforms: iOS; Android; Windows; macOS
- Release: October 14, 2016: iOS, Android; CHN: October 14, 2016; JP: February 22, 2017; TW: May 18, 2017; KR: October 17, 2017; SEA: November 1, 2017; WW: March 28, 2018; Windows; WW: December 26, 2019; macOS; WW: April 25, 2024
- Genres: Action role-playing, hack and slash
- Modes: Single-player, multiplayer

Honkai Impact 3rd (/ˈhɔːnˌkaɪ/, Chinese: 崩坏3; pinyin: Bēnghuài 3; lit. 'Collapse 3rd') is a 2016 free-to-play action role-playing game developed and published by miHoYo (with publishing outside mainland China under HoYoverse). It is the third installment in the science fantasy Honkai series and the spiritual successor to Guns Girl Z, using many characters from the previous title in a separate story. The game is notable for incorporating a variety of genres, from hack and slash and social simulation, to elements of bullet hell, platforming, shoot 'em up and dungeon crawling across multiple single and multiplayer modes. It features gacha mechanics. It was first released on mobile devices and later ported to Windows.

In addition to the game, the storyline of Honkai Impact 3rd spans multiple supplementary media including a series of animated shorts, multiple manhua series, and promotional videos.

== Gameplay ==
Honkai Impact 3rd is an action role-playing game where players control a team of up to three characters, known as Valkyries (previously localized as Valkyrja), in real-time battles. The combat follows a rock-paper-scissors-style system in which the game's three main combat types, Biologic, Psychic, and Mecha, are each effective against one of the other two, while two further types, Quantum and Imaginary, are largely unaffected by the rest. Players can swap characters mid-battle to chain attacks for greater effect, and can dodge incoming attacks by timing an evade button press, with a perfectly timed dodge briefly freezing time to allow a powerful counterattack.

Valkyries gain new skills as they level up, primarily through completing story quests, and can be further strengthened with weapons and Stigmata. Stigmata are equippable items represented as non-playable characters that grant buffs, such as attack or health. Players can gain extra bonuses by having a set of two or three Stigmata. However, having at least one Stigma with a higher star rating will be generally more valuable than completing a set. New Valkyries, weapons, and Stigmata are primarily obtained through Supply, the game's gacha system.

Player progress is tracked through a Captain Level, which rises through story progress and daily activities and unlocks features such as joining a guild, known as Armada, at level 30, and separate Valkyrie levels, which rise through battle experience or can be raised directly by spending gold and materials. Gold and Crystals are the game's two primary currencies, both earned through story progress, missions, and daily tasks, with Crystals, the premium currency, also purchasable with real money through microtransactions.

Outside combat, players can personalize the rooms of their Valkyries using the Dorm feature. The Valkyries appear as chibi versions of themselves, move freely around their rooms, use the furniture, and can be interacted with directly by the player.

== Story ==
=== Setting ===
Honkai Impact 3rd takes place in an alternate world where Earth has been ravaged by disasters caused by the Honkai. The Honkai is generally portrayed as a destructive force originating from a mysterious entity called the Will of Honkai. The Honkai can cause corruption to humans, create different monsters and give certain individuals superhuman abilities known as Authorities, making them Herrschers. Humans of the Previous Era created weapons called Divine Keys, which used the cores of Herrschers to give their wielders a fraction of a Herrscher’s power to fight the Honkai. The creation of a Herrscher can cause a large Honkai disaster, known as an Eruption. The Honkai is a recurring phenomenon that threatens civilizations as they advance.

The main story of the game takes place in the Current Era, in 2016. The Previous Era, which was more technologically advanced, was destroyed by the Honkai around 50,000 years ago. Various factions across the globe seek either to fight the Honkai or to utilize its power, including Schicksal, Anti-Entropy and World Serpent.

Three Eruptions occurred in the Current Era before the game's main story begins. The First Eruption occurred in 1952 and resulted in the birth of the Herrscher of Reason. The Second Eruption occurred in 2000, and the Herrscher of the Void was defeated by Schicksal and Anti-Entropy. The Third Eruption occurred in 2014, and the artificial awakening of the Herrscher of Thunder was suppressed. The Herrscher's host was then sent to Schicksal's St. Freya High School to train as a Valkyrie, a female warrior, to fight against the Honkai.

=== Plot ===
The game's three main characters, Kiana Kaslana, Raiden Mei, and Bronya Zaychik begin as Valkyrie students at St. Freya High School fighting Honkai outbreaks, but their lives change when Kiana becomes the vessel of Sirin, the Herrscher of the Void, through Schicksal leader Otto Apocalypse's schemes. St. Freya teacher Himeko sacrifices herself to save Kiana, who later learns to control her Herrscher powers with the help of the surviving consciousness of Fu Hua, a former member of the Flame-Chasers, a Previous Era group that fought the Honkai. As Kevin Kaslana, leader of World Serpent, enacts extreme plans to "save" humanity, Mei becomes the Herrscher of Thunder to save Kiana, joining Kevin and leaving Kiana behind.

The conflict picks up with the awakening of multiple Herrschers, the discovery of the Flame-Chasers and Otto's plan to change the timeline to bring back his childhood friend Kallen. Otto succeeds, at the cost of his life. Mei discovers that Elysia, the first Herrscher to fight for humanity, made it possible for later Herrschers such as Kiana, Mei, and Bronya to resist the Honkai's will.

Kevin states that he is the final test for mankind. Kiana, Mei and Bronya fight him on the Moon and defeat him together. Kiana is then recognized by the Cocoon of Finality, the entity associated with the Honkai's cycles of destruction, and becomes the Herrscher of Finality. She chooses to remain on the Moon to watch over Earth and humanity, entrusting Earth's future to her friends.

== Characters ==
=== St. Freya High School ===
St. Freya High School (圣芙蕾雅学园; Shèng Fúlěiyǎ Xuéyuán; 'Saint Freya Academy') is an educational institution founded by Theresa Apocalypse to train students to become Valkyries. It is located on a reclaimed island in the Far East region.

Kiana Kaslana (K423) (琪亚娜·卡斯兰娜; Qíyànà Kǎsīlánnà)
Voiced by: Tao Dian (Chinese); Rie Kugimiya (Japanese)
Kiana is the game's main protagonist, serving as a homage to the protagonist of the same name from miHoYo's first three games. Designated K423, she is a clone of the original Kiana Kaslana, now referred to as Durandal. She was created using genes from the Herrscher of the Void.
Raiden Mei (雷电芽衣; Léidiàn Yáyī)
Voiced by: Juhuahua (Chinese); Miyuki Sawashiro (Japanese)
Mei is one of the game's three main characters, serving as a homage to the character of the same name in Guns Girl Z. Her initial awakening as the Herrscher of Thunder triggers the Third Eruption in the city of Nagazora. The awakening is suppressed by Schicksal, and she is subsequently taken in by St. Freya to train as a Valkyrie student. She later re-awakens as the Herrscher of Thunder to join World Serpent and save a self-destructive Kiana from dying of Honkai corruption.
Bronya Zaychik (布洛妮娅·扎伊切克; Bùluònīyà Zhāyīqièkè)

Voiced by: Hanser (Chinese); Kana Asumi (Japanese)
Bronya is one of the game's three main characters, serving as a homage to the character of the same name in Guns Girl Z. She is a Russian orphan who lost her family during the Second Eruption. She was later raised as a child soldier and trained as an assassin. She initially infiltrated St. Freya under her adoptive mother Cocolia's orders, driven by the hope of finding a way to save her lost friend, Seele.
Fu Hua (符华; Fú Huá)
Voiced by: Mace (Chinese); Minami Takayama (Japanese)
Hua is a survivor of the Previous Era and a member of the Flame-Chasers ranked 12th, codenamed "Vicissitude". Tasked with guiding survivors of the Previous Era into the Current Era, she spends millennia protecting humanity, which leads to her being deified as a legendary sage in the country of Shenzhou. She later forms a partnership with Otto Apocalypse and serves as his agent. Following her betrayal by Otto, her body is temporarily taken over by the newborn consciousness of the Herrscher of Sentience.
Theresa Apocalypse (德丽莎·阿波卡利斯; Délìshā Ābōkǎlìsī)
Voiced by: Hualing (Chinese); Yukari Tamura (Japanese)
Theresa is the founder and principal of St. Freya and a clone created by Otto from the genes of his childhood friend Kallen. Despite this origin, she defies his methods to resurrect Kallen, though she remains closely tied to him. She was close friends with Kiana's parents, especially her mother, Cecilia Schariac, who died during the Second Eruption. She can be considered functionally similar to a MANTIS, a Previous Era human whose genes were fused with those of a Honkai Beast. Her own genes contain parts of the Honkai Beast Vishnu.
Murata Himeko (无量塔姬子; Wúliàngtǎ Jīzǐ)

Voiced by: Lin Su (Chinese); Rie Tanaka (Japanese)
Himeko is a teacher at St. Freya, leader of Schicksal's Squad V, and captain of the flying battleship Hyperion. She is originally deployed to rescue Kiana, Mei and Bronya from Nagazora and later acts as their squad leader and mentor after their enrollment at St. Freya. She is acquainted with fellow Valkyries Rita and Durandal through their former mentor, Ragna Lothbrok. She later sacrifices herself to save Kiana from the corruption of the Herrscher of the Void.

=== Schicksal ===
Schicksal (天命组织; Tiānmìng Zǔzhī; 'Destiny Organization') is the oldest anti-Honkai organization of the Current Era. It was founded in Europe during the Middle Ages as a religious organization. Schicksal deploys female human warriors known as Valkyries to combat the Honkai. The organization is usually ruled by a member of the Apocalypse family, which founded Schicksal, under the title of Overseer. It is currently led by Theresa Apocalypse, who succeeded Otto after his death.

Otto Apocalypse (奥托·阿波卡利斯; Àotuō Ābōkǎlìsī)
Voiced by: Zhao Lu (Chinese); Akira Ishida (Japanese)
Otto is a genius who has ruled Schicksal for roughly 500 years by transferring his consciousness across different bodies. He is the main antagonist in the first part of the story, driven by his obsessive goal to resurrect Kallen Kaslana.
Durandal (幽兰黛尔; Yōulándài'ěr)
Voiced by: Miao Jiang (Chinese); Mamiko Noto (Japanese)
Durandal is the strongest Valkyrie and the protagonist of the Durandal supplementary visual novel. She is later revealed to be the original Kiana Kaslana, from whom the game's main protagonist, K423, was cloned. She has since adopted the name Bianka Ataegina (比安卡·阿塔吉娜; Bǐ'ānkǎ Ātǎjínà).
Rita Rossweisse (丽塔·洛丝薇瑟; Lìtǎ Luòsīwēisè)
Voiced by: Xiao N (Chinese); Aoi Yūki (Japanese)
Rita is a Valkyrie who serves as Durandal's primary assistant and the second-in-command of the Immortal Blades squad.
Cecilia Schariac (塞西莉亚·沙尼亚特; Sāixīlìyà Shāníyàtè)
Voiced by: Fumeng Ruowei (Chinese); Yū Kobayashi (Japanese)
Cecilia is one of the most powerful Valkyries and the mother of Kiana. She plays a significant role during the Second Eruption and serves as a major character in the manhua series of the same name.
Shigure Kira (时雨绮罗; Shíyǔ Qǐluó)
Voiced by: Song Yuanyuan (Chinese); Ibuki Kido (Japanese)
Kira is a Valkyrie who arrived at a training camp expecting to join a talent training show, only to discover it had already ended and that she had unknowingly enrolled in Valkyrie training instead.
Susannah Mannatt (苏莎娜·玛纳特; Sūshānà Mǎnàtè)
Voiced by: Lin Su (Chinese); Chinatsu Hirose (Japanese)
Susannah is a Valkyrie and a member of the Phosdjinns Squad.
Ana Schariac (安娜·沙尼亚特; Ānnà Shāníyàtè)
Voiced by: Chen Tingting (Chinese); Aki Toyosaki (Japanese)
Ana is a Valkyrie and member of the Snow Lotus Squad. During the events at Coral Island, she becomes the Herrscher of Ice. After merging with the core of the Herrscher of Stars, the physical source of a Herrscher's power, previously held by World Serpent officer Owl, she transforms into the Herrscher of Rimestar.
Carole Pepper (卡萝尔·佩珀; Kǎluó'ěr Pèipò)
Voiced by: Wang Xiaotong (Chinese); Junko Iwao (Japanese)
Carole is a Valkyrie from the futuristic open-world game mode A Post-Honkai Odyssey (APHO). She is the daughter of Lewis Pepper, a former Valkyrie who fought in the Second Eruption. She is usually seen as an energetic troublemaker with a tendency to go AWOL. Despite this, she values her place as a Valkyrie.
Siegfried Kaslana (齐格飞·卡斯兰娜; Qígéfēi Kǎsīlánnà)
Voiced by: Peng Bo (Chinese); Tomokazu Seki (Japanese)
Siegfried is a Schicksal-trained knight and the father of Kiana. After the events of the Second Eruption, which killed his wife Cecilia, he goes rogue and later opposes both Schicksal and World Serpent. He is eventually captured by World Serpent and imprisoned within the Kaslana Stigma Space, a section in the higher-dimensional plane known as the Imaginary Space that houses the Kaslana family heritage.
Kallen Kaslana (卡莲·卡斯兰娜; Kǎlián Kǎsīlánnà)
Voiced by: Chen Yiwen (Chinese); Nana Mizuki (Japanese)
Kallen is a medieval Kaslana family member and the childhood friend of Otto Apocalypse. Known as the most legendary Valkyrie in Schicksal's history, she was ultimately executed after defying the organization over her bond with miko Yae Sakura. Her death drove Otto to embark on a centuries-long quest to resurrect her.
Li Sushang (李素裳; Lǐ Sùshang)
Voiced by: Chen Tingting (Chinese); Misato Fukuen (Japanese)
Sushang is one of the protagonists of the Saga of the Shattered Swords supplementary visual novel. Her mother, Qin Suyi, is one of the seven disciples from Fu Hua's School of Taixuan.

=== Anti-Entropy ===
Anti-Entropy (逆熵; Nì-Shāng) is an anti-Honkai organization founded by former members of Schicksal's North American branch. In 1955, these members broke from Schicksal after becoming dissatisfied with Otto's leadership, and Schicksal labelled them a rebel organization as a result. The organization was formally established the following year and favors technological and mechanized weapons in its fight against the Honkai.

Welt Yang (瓦尔特·杨; Wǎ'ěrtè Yáng)

Voiced by: Dai Chaohang, Nuo Ya (young) (Chinese); Yoshimasa Hosoya, Mariya Ise (young) (Japanese)
Welt Yang, whose real name is Joachim Nokianvirtanen (约阿希姆·诺基安维塔宁; Yuē'āxīmǔ Nuòjī'ānwéitǎníng), is the second Herrscher of Reason and the current head of Anti-Entropy. He inherits his name and core from the first Herrscher of the Current Era, Welt Joyce. He plays a critical role in confronting the Herrscher of the Void during the Second Eruption. The events that occur in the aftermath of APHO and the Alien Space supplementary manhua series eventually lead to his appearance in Honkai: Star Rail.
Frederica Nikola Tesla (芙蕾德莉卡·尼古拉·特斯拉; Fúlěidélìkǎ Nígǔlā Tèsīlā) and Lieserl Albert Einstein (丽瑟尔·阿尔伯特·爱因斯坦; Lìsè'ěr Ā'ěrbótè Àiyīnsītǎn)
Voiced by: Le Xiaotong (Chinese); Ayana Taketatsu (Japanese) (Tesla)
Voiced by: Qin Ziyi (Chinese); Mitsuki Saiga (Japanese) (Einstein)
Tesla and Einstein are Anti-Entropy scientists who frequently help the main cast. They conduct advanced research on Honkai energy and technology. Their biological ageing has significantly slowed down as a side-effect of being healed and revived by the Divine Key Abyss Flower during a past crisis.
Seele Vollerei (希儿·芙乐艾; Xī'ér Fúlè'ài)
Voiced by: Tang Yajing (Chinese); Mai Nakahara (Japanese)
Seele is an orphan raised at Cocolia's Orphanage alongside Bronya. She is a stigma-awakened individual, someone who has naturally activated tattoo-like genetic markings that channel Honkai energy, a power originating from the Imaginary Space. She shares her body with her stigma persona, commonly referred to as "the other Seele" or "Seele" (in quotation marks).
Liliya Olenyeva (莉莉娅·阿琳; Lìlìyà Ālín)
Voiced by: Yanning (Chinese); Yū Serizawa (Japanese)
The twin sister of Rozaliya. Unlike Rozaliya, Liliya is much more serious and level-headed. She grew up at Cocolia's Orphanage alongside her sister, joining other notable residents like Bronya and Seele.
Rozaliya Olenyeva (萝莎莉娅·阿琳; Luóshālìyà Ālín)
Voiced by: Duoduo Poi (Chinese); Aoi Koga (Japanese)
The twin sister of Liliya. Rozaliya is often seen as a very noisy and disruptive Valkyrie, but she shows her mature side when she looks after Liliya. She grew up at Cocolia's orphanage alongside her sister, joining other notable residents like Bronya and Seele.

=== World Serpent ===
World Serpent (世界蛇; Shìjiè Shé) is a secretive anti-Honkai organization led by Kevin Kaslana that seeks to defeat the Honkai through Project STIGMA, a Previous Era contingency plan originally authored by Dr. MEI, which aims to flood Earth with Honkai energy to sacrifice a massive portion of humanity so that a small fraction could evolve to survive.

Kevin Kaslana (凯文·卡斯兰娜; Kǎiwén Kǎsīlánnà)
Voiced by: Qin Qiege (Chinese); Satoshi Hino (Japanese)
The leader of the Flame-Chasers, currently ranked 1st and codenamed "Deliverance". Kevin is also the current head of World Serpent and the first member of the Kaslana family. His strength allowed him to eliminate many of the Previous Era's Herrschers. He acts as an antagonist throughout the majority of the story.
Misteln Schariac (米丝忒琳·沙尼亚特; Mǐsītèlín Shāníyàtè)
Voiced by: Fumeng Ruowei (Chinese); Yū Kobayashi (Japanese)
Misteln, also known by her World Serpent alias Hare (羽兔; Yǔtù), is the physical manifestation of the Schariac Stigma Space.
Chen Tianwu (陈天武; Chén Tiānwǔ)
Voiced by: Li Chunyin (Chinese); Sōichirō Hoshi (Japanese)
Chen, also known by his World Serpent alias Owl (夜枭; Yèxiāo), is a survivor of a major Honkai Eruption in Manila and was rescued by Ana Schariac.
Natasha Cioara (娜塔莎·希奥拉; Nàtǎshā Xī'àolā)
Voiced by: Xie Ying (Chinese); Sanae Kobayashi (Japanese)
Natasha, also known by her World Serpent alias Raven (渡鸦; Dùyā), is a highly skilled mercenary who runs an orphanage in Nagazora called the Roost. She is also a survivor of the Second Eruption.

=== MOTH ===
The MOTH, also known by its official name The Moth Who Chases the Flames (逐火之蛾; Zhú Huǒ zhī É; 'Moth Chasing the Fire'), is a global anti-Honkai organization from the Previous Era. MOTH stands for Myrmidons of Taskforce Honkai.

Dr. MEI (梅博士; Méi Bóshì)
Voiced by: Juhuahua (Chinese); Miyuki Sawashiro (Japanese)
Dr. MEI was a Previous Era scientist who led humanity's effort against the Honkai, creating various projects, such as stigmata, to combat the phenomenon. She resembled the Current Era's Raiden Mei but was otherwise unrelated. She had a romantic relationship with Kevin Kaslana.
PROMETHEUS (普罗米修斯; Pǔluómǐxiūsī)
Voiced by: Hanser (Chinese); Kana Asumi (Japanese)
PROMETHEUS is a super-advanced AI created by Dr. MEI to forecast Honkai attacks and assist in her research. She is later revealed to have hacked into the Cocoon of Finality shortly before the end of the Previous Era, becoming the Current Era's Will of Honkai and ensuring that its Herrschers would closely resemble those of the past, allowing humanity to counter them using existing knowledge.
Elysia (爱莉希雅; Àilìxīyǎ)
Voiced by: Yanning (Chinese); Marina Inoue (Japanese)
Elysia is the founder of the Flame-Chasers, currently ranked 2nd and codenamed "Ego". She was born as the very first Herrscher, the Herrscher of Origin in the Previous Era, and serves as the host of the simulated world Elysian Realm. She later sacrificed herself to allow future Herrschers to retain their humanity, and her profound love for humanity earned her the title of Herrscher of Human.
Eden (伊甸; Yīdiàn)
Voiced by: Zhang Anqi (Chinese); Juri Kimura (Japanese)
Eden is a member of the Flame-Chasers ranked 4th, codenamed "Gold". She was a well-known singer in the Previous Era who lived in extravagant luxury.
Su (苏; Sū)
Voiced by: Yang Chaoran (Chinese); Takahiro Sakurai (Japanese)
Su is a member of the Flame-Chasers ranked 7th, codenamed "Bodhi". He is the main protagonist of the Second Key supplementary manhua.
Mobius (梅比乌斯; Méibǐwūsī)
Voiced by: Cai Shujin (Chinese); Rumi Okubo (Japanese)
Mobius is a member of the Flame-Chasers ranked 10th, codenamed "Infinity". She is a scientist who collaborated on the creation of stigmata and assisted in the development of other projects.
Kalpas (千劫; Qiānjié)
Voiced by: Kinsen (Chinese); Yūsuke Kobayashi (Japanese)
Kalpas is a member of the Flame-Chasers ranked 6th, codenamed "Decimation". He is a MANTIS whose genes have been fused with the Honkai Beast Asura.
Aponia (阿波尼亚; Ābōníyà)
Voiced by: Yang Menglu (Chinese); Haruka Shiraishi (Japanese)
Aponia is a member of the Flame-Chasers ranked 3rd, codenamed "Discipline". A psychic with the power to see into the future and perceive people's fates, she was forcibly fused with the genes of the Honkai Beast Midoro by the MOTHs.
Griseo (格蕾修; Gélěixiū)
Voiced by: Zisu Jiuyue (Chinese); Hina Kino (Japanese)
Griseo is a member of the Flame-Chasers ranked 11th, codenamed "Stars". She is a painter who uses colors and art to express her perceptions of the world around her.
Kosma (科斯魔; Kēsīmó)
Voiced by: Chu Huazheng (Chinese); Chiaki Kobayashi (Japanese)
Kosma is a member of the Flame-Chasers ranked 9th, codenamed "Daybreak". He is a MANTIS whose genes have been fused with the Honkai Beast Vishnu.
Pardofelis (帕朵菲莉丝; Pàduǒfēilìsī)
Voiced by: Jin Na (Chinese); Nozomi Yamamoto (Japanese)
Pardofelis is a member of the Flame-Chasers ranked 13th, codenamed "Reverie". She acts as a merchant in the Elysian Realm along with her cat companion Can. She has the ability to utilize "invisible shortcuts", which refers to dimensional portals, to instantly traverse locations.
Vill-V (维尔薇; Wéi'ěr Wēi)
Voiced by: Ruan Congqing (Chinese); Hisako Kanemoto (Japanese)
Vill-V is a member of the Flame-Chasers ranked 5th, codenamed "Helix". Her ability to partition her mind into eight distinct personas allows her to take on a range of roles. She created multiple Divine Keys using the cores of the Previous Era's Herrschers. She also created numerous "Kevin Killer" contingency devices designed to counter Kevin Kaslana.

=== Major Herrschers ===
Wendy (温蒂; Wēndì)
Voiced by: Nuo Ya (Chinese); Ryoko Maekawa (Japanese)
Wendy is a former Valkyrie who suffered a severe psychological breakdown after Otto Apocalypse implanted a Herrscher core known as the Gem of Desire into her, transforming her into the Herrscher of Wind.
Sirin (西琳; Xīlín)
Voiced by: Wang Xiaotong (Chinese); Sakura Tange (Japanese)
Sirin is a Belarusian girl who became the Current Era's Herrscher of the Void after suffering abuse as a subject of Schicksal's research. She is the main antagonist in the Second Eruption supplementary manhua. During the game's events, her residual malice resurfaces through Kiana, becoming a major antagonist that drives another crisis for the Valkyries.
Herrscher of Dominance (支配之律者; Zhīpèi zhī Lǜzhě)
Voiced by: Xu Xiang (Chinese); Ryōsuke Higa (Japanese) (Minion)
Voiced by: Mufei (Chinese); Atsumi Tanezaki (Japanese) (Puppet)
The Herrscher of Dominance is a collective entity formed when a thousand human consciousnesses were absorbed into a single hive mind.

=== Others ===
Yae Sakura (八重樱; Bāchóng Yīng)
Voiced by: Du Mingya (Chinese); Ayane Sakura (Japanese)
Sakura is a miko from Yae village. She met Kallen after Kallen fled from Schicksal forces to the Far East, and the two formed a bond. She shares a resemblance with the Previous Era's SAKURA, a member of the Flame-Chasers ranked 8th, codenamed "Setsuna", but the two are otherwise unrelated. SAKURA's younger sister, RIN, became the Herrscher of Corruption.
Ai Hyperion Λ (爱衣·休伯利安Λ; Àiyī Xiūbólì'ān Λ)
Voiced by: Wang Yaxin (Chinese); Yui Horie (Japanese)
Ai is a character who bridges the game world and the players.
Vita (薇塔; Wēitǎ)
Voiced by: Yan Yeqiao (Chinese); Yoko Hikasa (Japanese)
Vita is a native of the Salt Snow Holy City who acts as a guide for Seele, Susannah, and Shigure Kira in their search for Seele's other personality. During the collaboration event between the game and Honkai: Star Rail, she accepts Sparkle's invitation to join the Masked Fools.

=== Crossovers ===
Asuka Shikinami Langley (式波·明日香·蘭格雷; Shìbō Míngrìxiāng Lángéléi)

Voiced by: Yūko Miyamura (Japanese)
Asuka is a pilot of a mecha called an Evangelion. She appears in the game following a mysterious event and later assists Anti-Entropy and other Valkyries in fighting off Angels and Honkai Beasts before the limited-time crossover event concluded.
Fischl (菲谢尔; Fēixiè'ěr)

Voiced by: Mace (Chinese); Maaya Uchida (Japanese)
Fischl is an investigator from the Adventurers' Guild of the fictional nation Mondstadt. In the event's story, Otto Apocalypse observes her from the fictional planet Teyvat via the Imaginary Tree, a cosmic framework connecting every Honkai universe and other miHoYo games, and encodes her data into a game proposal. The proposal is co-developed by E.T. Studio, a video game company founded by Welt Yang and Bronya, and Schicksal Entertainment, Schicksal's entertainment subsidiary. She is then developed into a playable character for E.T. Studio's internal alpha test.
Sparkle (花火; Huāhuǒ)

Voiced by: Zhao Shuang (Chinese); Reina Ueda (Japanese)
Sparkle is a member of the Masked Fools, a group that travels across the cosmos engaging in chaotic acts for amusement. She later invites Vita to join the faction.

== Development ==
The production team for Honkai Impact 3rd grew from a 7-person start to employing over 200 employees in 2018. miHoYo offers small amounts of in-game currency to users that fill out surveys about their experience in the game, allowing the game's developers to adjust future events and tweak the game. As a result, Honkai Impact 3rd is under a continuous-update system, patching bug fixes and changing or adding content multiple times per year. The game has had many significant changes since launch, including rewriting the entire first two chapters of the story in a December 2018 update. The developers stated that their decision to make Honkai Impact 3rd be in the free-to-play monetization system (rather than a premium, or paid, game) with the purpose of making the game more available to players. Devil May Cry and Bayonetta significantly affected the game makers' ideas for the fight system of Honkai Impact 3rd.

== Related media ==
=== Manhua ===
Honkai Impact 3rd features a serialized manhua series of the same name in Chinese and in English. The series begins before Chapter 1 of the main game story arc that aims to supplement and flesh out the in-game plot, and often includes character origins. Several in-game battlesuits worn by the Valkyries are illustrated in the series as well. The series has three prequel titles and one main title.

=== Donghua ===
Cooking with Valkyries (女武神的餐桌; Nǚ Wǔshén de Cānzhuō), a non-canon slice of life cooking television donghua series of Honkai Impact 3rd featuring 19 short episodes, was released from July to September 2020. The bilibili releases are available in Mandarin Chinese, while the Japanese broadcast versions are in Japanese.

ELF Academy (人偶学园; Rén'ǒu Xuéyuán), another non-canon donghua of Honkai Impact 3rd with 10 episodes, was released from July to September 2021, and also contains Mandarin Chinese and Japanese voice acting. This series is about ELFs (Equipment: Living Form), which are autonomous weapons created to replace living soldiers, going to school and interacting with each other.

== Release and reception ==
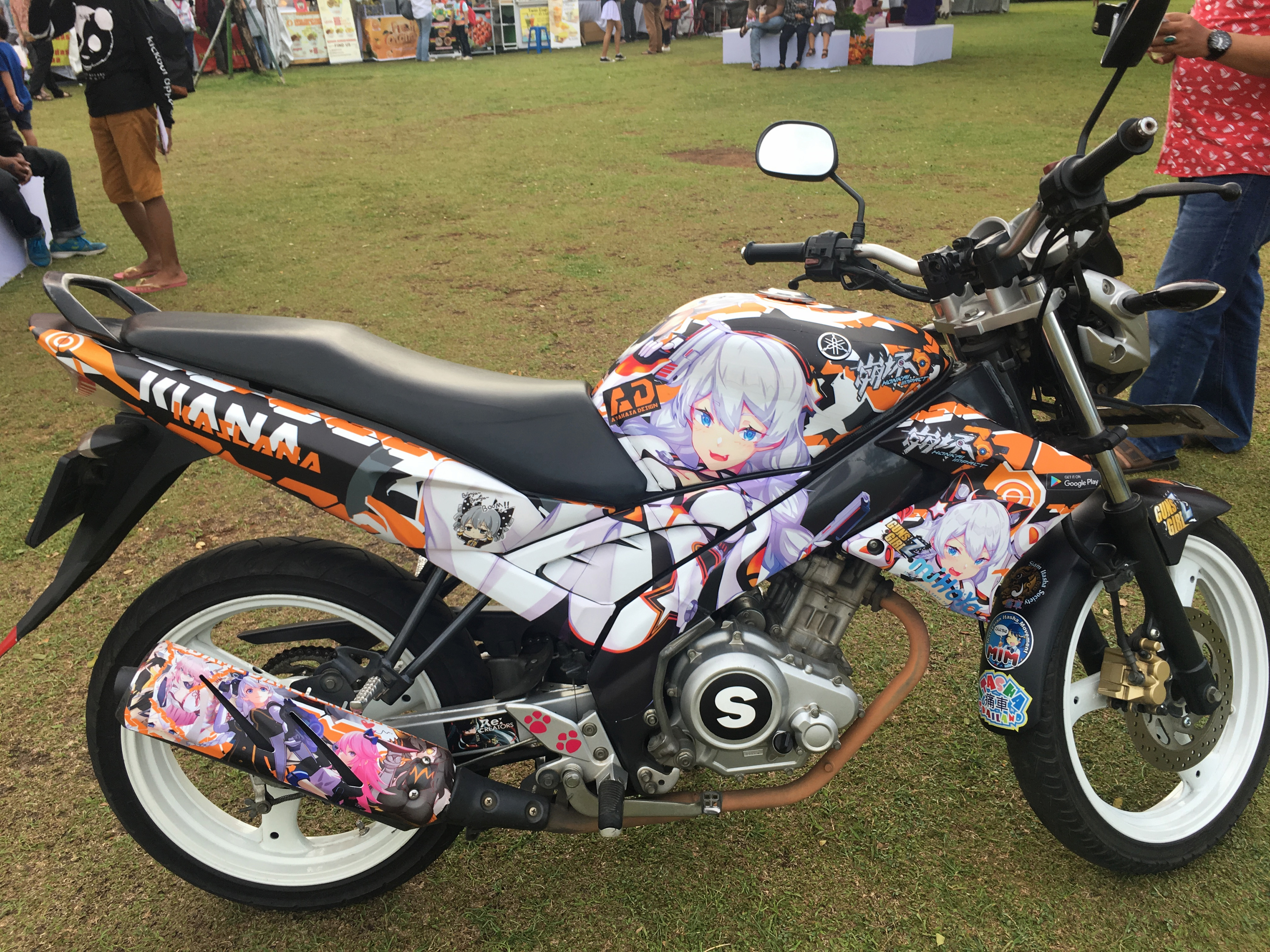
A Honkai Impact 3rd-themed itasha in Indonesia

The game first attracted a large fanbase in Asia before spreading globally. First released for iOS and Android in China on October 14, 2016, it reached 1 million downloads in Japan 11 days after its release there on February 22, 2017, and IGN reported that Honkai Impact 3rd had gathered a total of 35 million downloads worldwide as of March 28, 2018. The game was released in Taiwan on May 18, 2017, South Korea on October 17, 2017, and Southeast Asia on November 1, 2017, followed by North America and Europe on March 28, 2018. The Windows version was released on December 26, 2019, while a macOS version for the Mac App Store was announced for release on April 25, 2024. It supports multiple languages, including simplified and traditional Chinese, English, Japanese, Korean, Vietnamese, Thai, and French, with voices in Chinese and Japanese.

A major update, informally referred to as Honkai Impact 3rd Part 2, was released on February 29, 2024. It began the game's second major story arc, adding new characters, a reworked user interface, an updated engine, and a shift from a mission-based structure to a limited open-world structure.

In an article from 2017, Ungeek.com says that the game has some later-game systems that are unintuitive, and cites the large download size for a mobile game as a negative. The review praised the game's visual quality and the ease of learning to play the game, as well as the overall quality of the game, and positively recommended it. The article mentioned that the quality of the game was comparable to console games.

=== 2021 anniversary incident ===
To celebrate the third anniversary of the game's global version, developer miHoYo introduced promotional character skins and content themed around casino-style bunny suits. The controversy stemmed from either Chinese server players being dissatisfied over missing out on the regional treatment or the content acting as a tipping point for long-standing community frustrations. In response to the severe backlash, miHoYo issued a public apology, removed or adjusted the anniversary celebration content, and distributed compensations to both global and Chinese players. The situation escalated sharply on April 24, 2021, when an armed assailant attempted an assassination against miHoYo's founders at the company's headquarters in Shanghai before being arrested on-site without causing injury. While the promotional video was pulled down by the developers, it remained accessible online through third-party reuploads.
