= Zhang Lu (interpreter) =

Chinese diplomat

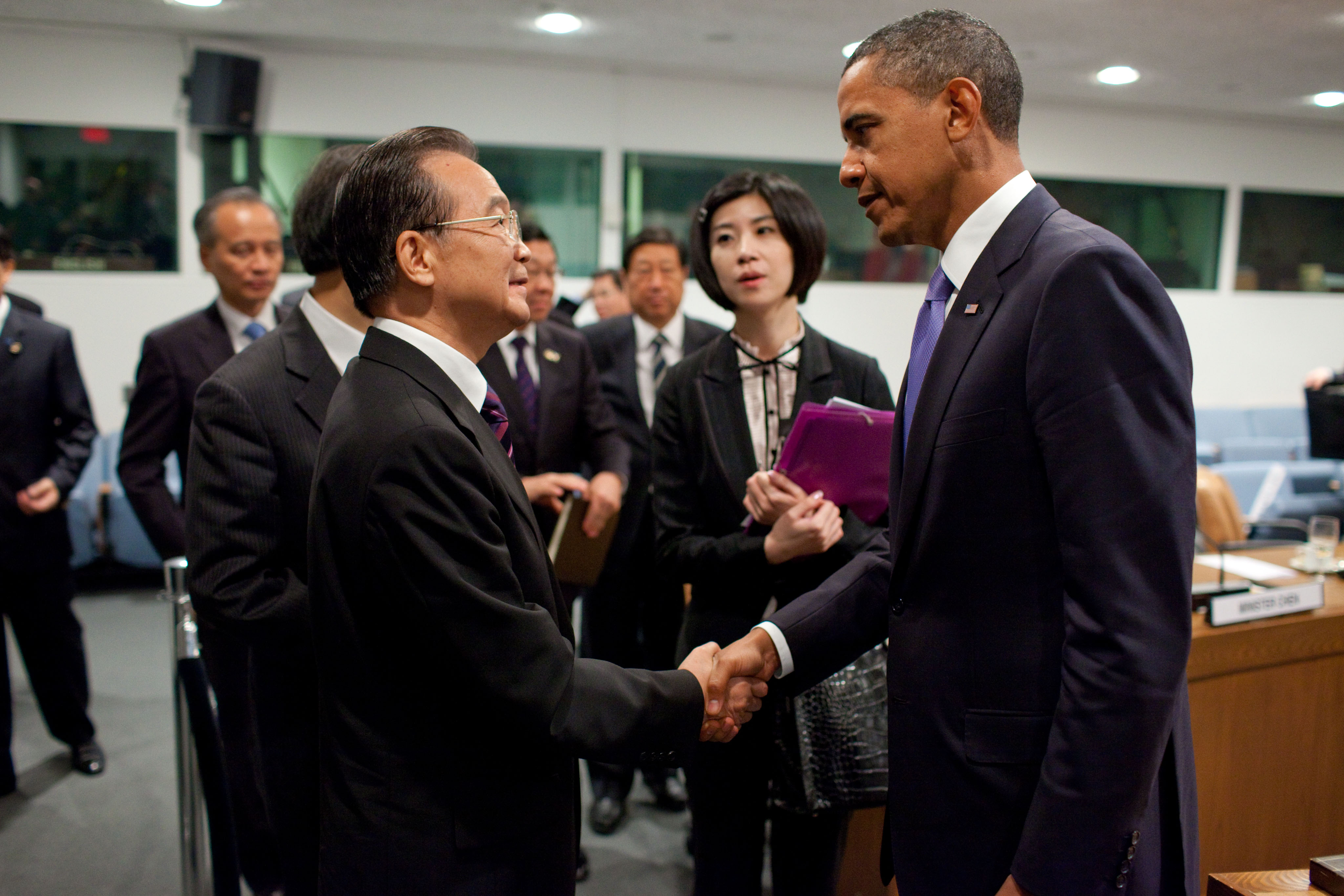
- Zhang seen in between Premier Wen and President Obama
- Born: 1977 (age 48–49); Jinan, Shandong, China
- Education: China Foreign Affairs University; University of Westminster
- Occupation: Interpreter
- Known for: The interpreter of Hu Jintao and Wen Jiabao
- Political party: Chinese Communist Party

Zhang Lu (simplified Chinese: 张璐; traditional Chinese: 張璐; born in 1977) is a Chinese diplomatic language interpreter for senior officials. Her translation skills and beauty made her a celebrity in China.

Zhang was born and grew up in Jinan. She graduated from the China Foreign Affairs University in 2000. Zhang gained public attention in 2010 by translating quotations from Classical Chinese literature used by Premier Wen Jiabao at the 2010 National People's Congress. In 2016, she was a division chief in the Ministry of Foreign Affairs's Department of Translation and Interpretation.
