= Cai Haoyu =

Chinese entrepreneur and video game producer (born 1987)

- 蔡浩宇
- Born: July 29, 1987 (age 39); Jinan, Shandong, China
- Other name: Hugh Tsai
- Education: Shanghai Jiao Tong University (BSc., MSc.)
- Occupations: Co-founder and CEO of miHoYo; CEO of Cognosphere

Chinese name
- Chinese: 蔡浩宇
Transcriptions
Standard Mandarin
- Hanyu Pinyin: Cài Hàoyǔ
Yue: Cantonese
- Jyutping: Coi^{3} Hou^{6}jyu^{5}

Cai Haoyu (Chinese: 蔡浩宇; pinyin: Cài Hàoyǔ; born July 29, 1987), also known as Hugh Tsai, is a Chinese businessman, investor, and video game producer. He is best known as the co-founder and CEO of the video game company miHoYo. The Chinese magazine New Fortune ranked Cai in 73rd place on the "2022 New Fortune 500 Rich List" that ranks the 500 richest people in China.

== Early life ==
Cai was born in Jinan, Shandong, in 1987. His parents, Cai Zhili and Lu Zizhen, who both work as computer subject-related instructors of Shandong Jiaotong University, began teaching him about computers after noticing his interest for it beginning when he was five years old and exhibiting his aptitude for it.

Cai attended Jinan Baliqiao Primary School (Chinese: 济南八里桥小学), Jinan Foreign Language School, and Shandong Experimental High School. In 1995, Cai received second place in the animation category in the youth division of the National Computer Competition. In 1996, he received the "Top Ten Teenagers in Tianqiao District, Jinan City" award. In 1998, his "Alien Envoy" (Chinese: 外星使者) and "Blue-Eared Spaceship" (Chinese: 蓝耳朵飞船) submissions received second place in the animation category in the youth division of the National Computer Competition. In February 1999 when he was 12 years old, he was elected to the Chinese Youth Academy of Sciences in the first group of junior academicians chosen. He said in an interview, "The computer is not a dead thing. It changes all the time. I have to keep learning to keep up with it." He matriculated at Shanghai Jiao Tong University when the institution admitted him as a student in 2005. He majored in computer science and also went on to earn a master's degree from the same university.

Also at an early age, the young Cai exhibited entrepreneurial proclivities, which also influenced him as a youth to "conduct business." One of his first business ventures as a teenager was when he bought Xiaolingtong cordless telephones for cheap and sold them for a profit. As a junior in high school, he sold watches as a side venture. By the time Cai reached college, he became an active stock investor, where in one instance, his speculative success in stocks allowed him to earn a windfall profit over CN¥300,000 (US$46,511.63) in a single month.

== Career ==
At SJTU, Cai became roommates with Liu Wei and Luo Yuhao. He and his roommates became drawn to the ACG subculture of animation, comics, and games. In 2009, they made video games with ACG as the theme including as their graduation project. Cai started making his first game FlyMe2theMoon in 2010. Two years later, it received its first and only angel investment worth 1 million RMB. After that, he started to work on Zombiegal Kawaii as the production director.

Cai and his roommates secured a CN¥100,000 (US$15,504) grant from the Shanghai Technology Innovation Center's Eagle Program. In January 2011, using the grant, they established miHoYo in a university dormitory while they were second-year graduate students. It began as a literary open source community. Cai is the chairman of miHoYo, which by 2021, made over ¥10 billion (US$1.4 billion) in revenue. Chinese Business Strategy, a media company that profiles businesspeople, said Cai "tends to think intuitively, is responsible for business strategy decisions, and is meticulous about affairs management".

On February 14, 2022, miHoYo announced the launch of a new brand HoYoverse for markets outside of Greater China, with Cai as the CEO.

In May 2022, New Fortune, a Chinese magazine, published the "2022 New Fortune 500 Rich List" ranking the 500 richest people in China. Cai made his first appearance on the list in 73rd place at ¥56 billion (US$8.7 billion). Among the first 100 people on the list, Cai was the only person who made his fortune in the Chinese video game industry. He is the richest person in Jinan.

In September 2023, the board of directors of miHoYo passed a resolution that Cai would no longer serve as the legal representative and chairman of miHoYo, and his position would be taken over by Liu Wei. Several media reported that Cai would move to North America, and has been interested in the large language models. miHoYo responded to the press that Cai would "continue to devote himself to the research and application of cutting-edge technology, the development of new projects, and the connection of domestic and overseas R&D resources." In late 2023, Cai announced the formation of Anuttacon, a California-based startup company, which would later announce its first game, titled Whispers from the Star, in 2025.

== Family ==
Cai Haoyu is based in Shanghai after graduating from Jiaotong University, but his parents and relatives still stay in Shandong, and he goes back to his hometown of Jinan every Spring Festival to visit his parents. Cai still has some close friends in Shandong and continues to maintain contacts and business contacts.
