= MiHoYo =

Chinese video game developer

miHoYo Co., Ltd.

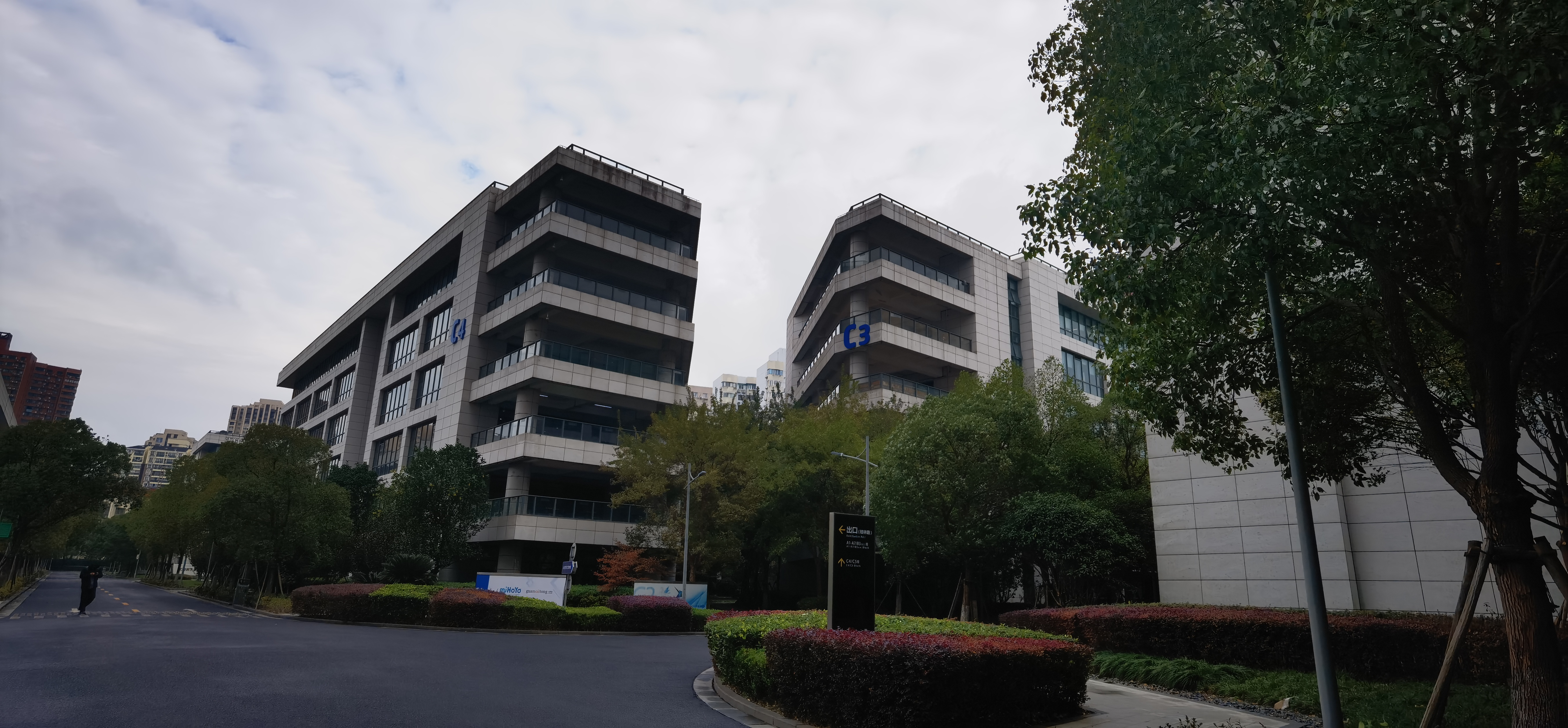
- Headquarters in Shanghai, China
- Native name: 上海米哈游网络科技股份有限公司
- Industry: Video games
- Founded: January 2011; 15 years ago (as miHoYo Studio); 13 February 2012; 14 years ago (Company)
- Founders: Cai Haoyu; Liu Wei (president, chairman of the board); Luo Yuhao (vice president)
- Headquarters: Shanghai, China
- Number of locations: 9
- Area served: Worldwide
- Key people: Zhang Qinghua (art director); Cai Jinhan (music director)
- Products: Honkai series; Tears of Themis; Genshin Impact; Zenless Zone Zero
- Services: Miyoushe; HoYoLAB
- Total assets: $7 billion
- Number of employees: 5000 (2022)
- Divisions: HoYoverse; HOYO-MiX
- Website: mihoyo.com

Shanghai Mihoyo Network Technology Co., Ltd.
- Simplified Chinese: 上海米哈游网络科技股份有限公司
- Traditional Chinese: 上海米哈遊網絡科技股份有限公司
Transcriptions
Standard Mandarin
- Hanyu Pinyin: Shànghǎi Mǐhāyóu Wǎngluò Kējì Gǔfèn Yǒuxiàn Gōngsī
- Wade–Giles: Shang^{4}-hai^{3} Mi^{3}-ha^{1}-yu^{2} Wang^{3}-lo^{4} K'o^{1}-chi^{4} Ku^{3}-fen^{4} Yu^{3}-hsien^{4} Kung^{1}-ssu^{1}
- IPA: [ʂâŋ.xàɪ mì.xá.iǒʊ uàŋ.lwô kʰɤ́.tɕî kù.fə̂n iôʊ.ɕjɛ̂n kʊ́ŋ.sí]
Wu
- Romanization: ^{6}zaon-he_{5} ^{6}mi-ha-yeu ^{6}maon-loq ^{1}khu-ji_{6} ^{5}ku-ven_{6} ^{6}yeu-ye ^{1}kon-sy_{1}
Yue: Cantonese
- Yale Romanization: Seúhng-hói Máih-hā-yàuh Móhng-lok Fō-geih Gú-fahn Yáuh-haahn Gūng-sī
- Jyutping: Soeng^{5}-hoi^{2} Mai^{5}-haa^{1}-jau^{4} Mong^{5}-lok^{3} Fo^{1}-gei^{6} Gu^{2}-fan^{6} Jau^{5}-haan^{6} Gung^{1}-si^{1}
- IPA: [sœŋ˩˧.hɔj˧˥ mɐj˩˧.ha˥.jɐw˩ mɔŋ˩˧.lɔk̚˧ fɔ˥.kej˨ ku˧˥.fɐn˨ jɐw˩˧.han˨ kʊŋ˥.si˥]

miHoYo Co., Ltd. (Note: /miˈhoʊ.joʊ/; Chinese: 米哈游; pinyin: Mǐhāyóu) is a Chinese video game developer founded in 2012 and headquartered in Shanghai. The company is best known for developing popular gacha games, including the Honkai series, Tears of Themis, Genshin Impact, and Zenless Zone Zero. Beyond video games, miHoYo has diversified its output, creating various products including animated series, novels, comics, music, and merchandise.

Following the global success of Genshin Impact, which became one of the highest-grossing mobile games of 2021, miHoYo launched its global publishing brand named Cognosphere (trading as HoYoverse) in 2022. HoYoverse was established to manage and expand miHoYo's content production and global publishing outside of China. HoYoverse, miHoYo's international division, operates in Singapore and handles global operations under the brand, with additional offices in Montreal, Los Angeles, Tokyo, and Seoul.

== Etymology ==
The letters "H" and "Y" in miHoYo's name are derived from the names of two of the three founders, Cai Haoyu and Luo Yuhao. The letter "O" was then added because famous companies like Facebook, Google and Microsoft contain that letter. Since the combination "HoYo" was already registered, the prefix "mi" was prepended to the name. The prefix "mi" was inspired by the VOCALOID software Hatsune Miku, who was chosen due to her widespread popularity among the otaku community.

== History ==
=== 2011–2012: Founding years and first game ===
miHoYo was founded by three Shanghai Jiao Tong University computer science students- Cai Haoyu, Liu Wei, and Luo Yuhao (罗宇皓), who shared a passion for technology and ACG (anime, comics, and games) culture. Before formally establishing miHoYo, the team collaborated on several projects. Their first project, an open-source literature community, earned them scholarships worth CNY 200,000 at a competition.

In 2010, the students developed an isometric tile-based game engine called the "Misato Engine" or "Misato2D" using Adobe Flash Player. The name was inspired by Katsuragi Misato, a character from the Japanese franchise Neon Genesis Evangelion. Using an upgraded version of the engine, they developed a game called Legend of Saha (娑婆物语) for a Flash game development competition held during the second China Game Developers Conference (CGDC) in July of that year. The team won a CNY 30,000 cash prize provided by Shanda Games. Shanda Games subsequently outsourced it to develop a mini-game called Bubble Hero (泡泡英雄).

==== Studio business ====
In January 2011, the three students established the miHoYo studio in the D32 university dormitory on their campus. Later that year, Liu Wei, representing the group, participated in the New Entrepreneur Talents (新新创业达人) competition and won third place. As a result, miHoYo was awarded a 50-square-meter office, located at No. 100 Qinzhou Road, along with a six-month term and a CNY 100,000 interest-free loan from the Eaglet Program (雏鹰计划) of the Shanghai Technology Entrepreneurship Foundation for Graduates (上海市大学生科技创业基金会). They moved from the dormitory to the office in December. In the new space, each founder had a desk against the wall, while a large table was dedicated to comics and light novels.

Since none of the founding students possessed artistic ability, they contracted Zhang Qinghua (张庆华), also known as CiCi, via Tencent social media. At the time, Zhang was an undergraduate student in the Department of Animation at the School of Art and Design at Guangdong University of Technology. He was in the second half of his senior year when he met miHoYo's founders during his internship. The first character he was commissioned to design was Kiana Kaslana, the main character of its game FlyMe2theMoon. As the only artist on the team, he created all the artwork for its early titles. Zhang recounted his experience of working at their dormitory:

I stayed in Wei's dormitory for some time. When I went out or fetched water, I had to secretly avoid the dormitory supervisor. When I finished my art work and was about to return to Guangzhou to graduate, the day I walked out of the dormitory with my luggage, the supervisor took the initiative to say goodbye to me. In fact, she knew that I was not a student here, but she did not chase me away. This [was] my first impression of Shanghai, [which was] very good.

当时还在大伟哥宿舍借宿过一段时间，出门或者打水都要偷偷避开宿管。等我做完美术工作要回广州毕业时，提着行李走出宿舍的那天，宿管主动和我打招呼道别，其实她知道我不是这里的学生但也并没有赶我。这是我对上海的最初印象，挺好的。

==== FlyMe2theMoon ====
miHoYo launched FlyMe2theMoon on the App Store on 28 September 2011, operating as an independent developer. The game's concept was based on "Fly me to the moon", the ending theme of the Neon Genesis Evangelion anime series. The song inspired the team to create a puzzle game centered on a "magical girl flying [to] the moon." The game was developed using the Cocos2D software and the Box2D physics engine. The game's song, titled "Moon Trip", featured music composed by VOCALOID music producer Yu Jianliu (裕剑流) and lyrics written by Lemonjolly. Yu utilised the Hatsune Miku voicebank for the song.

FlyMe2theMoon achieved little financial success, leaving the three founders with a monthly income of only CNY 4,000. In search of an investor, Liu Wei represented the team in various university startup contests. Securing funding was challenging due to two factors: the non-mainstream status of anime and gaming culture in China at the time, and the fact that the group consisted solely of recent university graduates. After being rejected in these competitions, they eventually secured an angel investment of CNY 1,000,000 from Hangzhou Skye Network Technology Co., Ltd. (杭州斯凯网络科技有限公司). This proved to be miHoYo's only outside funding.

=== 2012–2016: Company formation and first Honkai titles ===
Shanghai Mihoyo Network Technology Co., Ltd. (上海米哈游网络科技股份有限公司) was officially established on 13 February 2012. A member of the FlyMe2theMoon development team, Jin Zhicheng (靳志成), left in March to accept a job offer at Cisco Systems (China) Research & Development Co., Ltd. (思科系统（中国）研发有限公司). He transferred his equity shares to Liu Wei and Luo Yuhao. Jin had primarily performed a small amount of program development work and did not participate in company management.

Zhang Qinghua, who had worked as an artist at 4399 Network Co., Ltd. (4399网络股份有限公司) joined miHoYo Co., Ltd. in February 2012 as an art director and supervisor.

Cai Haoyu legally represents the company and serves as its chairman and general manager; he is also the controlling shareholder and the actual controller. Liu Wei and Luo Yuhao serve as directors. Cai is the largest shareholder of miHoYo, controlling 41% of miHoYo's shares. Liu and Luo control 22.6% and 21.4%, of the shares respectively. The remaining 15% of the shares belong to Miyi Investment Co., Ltd. (杭州米艺投资有限公司).

==== Zombiegal Kawaii ====
Moving on from FlyMe2theMoon, the miHoYo team aimed to create a more successful game. Inspired by the side-scrolling shooter game Zombie Town and their shared interest in the Japanese anime-manga series Highschool of the Dead, it created its first game since the company's formal founding: Zombiegal Kawaii, also known as Houkai Gakuen.

The project began in December 2011. It took the team three months just to create four or five demos for the game. The game was developed using the Unity engine (specifically versions 3.2 to 3.5) and the Autodesk Maya computer graphics software. Over the next eight months, they expanded the gameplay, adjusted values, and added various game systems. The game's first version was released in November 2012, and the first public testing occurred in December of that year.

==== Guns Girl Z ====
There are many reasons why we made Guns Girl Z. When making this type of game, there was not much thought into the details. We wanted to make a game we want to play so we did it. We discovered that the top-ranking games at the App Store didn't have the types of games we wanted to play, so we made our own. The reason is that simple.

为什么要做《崩坏学园》这款游戏，有很多的理由。做这款游戏当时没有想游戏细分的问题，没有想太多，我们就想做一款自己喜欢玩的游戏，所以我们就做了。我们自己想玩游戏的时候，发现AppStore畅销榜上的游戏没有一款是我们想玩的，于是做款自己想玩的游戏，理由就是这么简单。

— Cai Haoyu, 2014

Guns Girl Z, also known as Houkai Gakuen 2, a pick-up-and-play arcade action game, was launched in June 2013. Later in August, the team began working on server architecture design and generation. Work on the peripheral system and game graphics followed in November. Compared to Zombiegal Kawaii, the development time of Guns Girl Z was shorter because it utilised the underlying data, art assets, and core gameplay of the previous game, thus reducing the needed research and development. The core gameplay was further developed by copying and then converting the system of the game Puzzle and Dragons (智龙迷城) into an action game, a process that took three months. The content taken from Zombiegal Kawaii was expanded with the addition of new characters, weapons, and clothing sets. Testing started on 26 January 2014, and the game was released in March on the Bilibili platform.

Though the game achieved some financial success, it suffered from many technical problems, such as top-up failure and server downtime, which were difficult for a team composed of only seven people to manage. Consequently, the company began employing its players as staff. Within the same year, the Honkai Impact 3rd project began, concurrent with the company's vision of creating the "Honkai universe".

=== 2016–2020: Breakthrough with Honkai Impact 3rd ===
The Honkai Impact 3rd project began in June 2014. On 6 July of that year, Cai Haoyu attended the GameLook Game Open Day conference in Shanghai, where he spoke on the development and promotion of Guns Girl Z. In his speech, he mentioned that the team was already working on the third Honkai game and that its core gameplay was currently in progress.

In March 2015, miHoYo started developing its proprietary engines for the game. They created a physics-based animation system that could simulate the performance of various bodies based on physical formulas, resulting in more realistic character movements and destructive scene effects. This system also corrected abrupt transitions between animations, making them smoother and more natural. In addition, miHoYo developed its technologies for 3D modeling, light mapping, and real-time and pre-rendering systems. Content production for the game began in October 2015.

The combat gameplay drew creative influences from game series Bayonetta and Devil May Cry. The development team also studied games like Guilty Gear Xrd, which utilized 3D cel-shading. Since no team member had prior experience with 3D projects, transitioning from 2D development presented a significant challenge. Creating the initial artwork, model, and animation Kiana Kaslana took six months. However, after a test run, the team decided to discard that work and restarted from scratch to establish the games' current system.

Honkai Impact 3rd had its internal iOS beta in March 2016. It launched in September, underwent public testing, and was then officially released in October. Recurring characters such as Kiana Kaslana, Raiden Mei, and Bronya Zaychik appear in a story that differs from previous games in the franchise. The gameplay involves role playing and hack-and-slash action, and it also incorporates gacha mechanics. In addition to the game, it was followed by multiple supplementary media, including an anime series, graphic novels, comics, and promotional videos. Though miHoYo's earlier titles achieved success within Asia, the company did not reach global success until the release of Honkai Impact 3rd.

Following its release in Mainland China, subsequent international servers were opened: 22 February 2017, for Japan; 18 May 2017, for Taiwan; 17 October 2017, for South Korea; 1 November 2017, for Southeast Asia; and 28 March 2018, for North America and Europe. After initially being a mobile-exclusive game, Honkai Impact 3rd was made available for PC on 26 December 2019.

==== Company growth and risks ====
Within two years after the release of Honkai Impact 3rd, the company rapidly expanded from seven-people to approximately 200 employees. Over 100 of these employees were involved in research and development. The team was notably young, with an average age of 29 years old. Employees under the age of thirty accounted for 84% of the total staff. Four years later, the employee count continued its rapid increase, surpassing 1,000.

On 15 February 2017, miHoYo filed for an initial public offering (IPO) with the China Securities Regulatory Commission, planning to raise over one billion Yuan. During the filing process, several concerns were highlighted regarding the company's financial stability. A prime concern was the company's significant dependent on a single intellectual property (IP), the Honkai series. At the time on the initial filing, the main source of miHoYo's revenue was Guns Girl Z, accounting for 96.34% of its income. The risk was that the company might not successfully launch new products or update existing game content, potentially leading to a loss of users. Another major issue raised was the possibility that the company could fail to keep up with changing player preferences, causing the Honkai series to lose its appeal. On 19 December, miHoYo submitted an updated prospectus that included Honkai Impact 3rd in its revenue calculation, showing that the Honkai titles combined accounted for 98.82% of the total revenue. Due to unknown reasons, miHoYo ultimately withdrew its IPO application in 2020.

==== Official gamer forums ====
HoYoLAB wordmark

In November 2018, miHoYo launched its official gamer community Miyoushe (米游社), also known as miHoYo BBS. While used to disseminate official game information and event peripherals, it also features practical tools for players, such as calculators and character-building simulations. Crucially, it serves as a content creation platform for players.

The global counterpart, initially called miHoYo Forums, launched on 16 January 2020. It was announced as the official forum for Genshin Impact. Later, it got rebranded as "HoYoLAB." The HoYoLAB app had begun closed beta testing on 1 June 2021 and officially launched on 15 July.

In Chinese forums, the mascot Miyouji (米游姬) was revealed on 30 April 2020. Miyouji has different themed costumes following miHoYo's games, such as Guns Girl Z, Honkai Impact 3rd, Tears of Themis, and Genshin Impact. Miyouji is accompanied by a rabbit that appears in the forum's logo. HoYoLAB's mascot is Mimo, who also appears as the logo.

==== Tears of Themis ====
Tears of Themis is an adventure visual novel game developed and published by miHoYo that combines romance and detective elements. The game released its first PV on 29 July 2019. It started its pre-registration on 29 July 2020, and officially went live on 30 July 2020. The game had a closed beta test for its international version in April and May 2021, and opened its pre-registration in June, reaching over 650,000 pre-registrations. The game received the Pocket Gamer People's Choice Award in 2022. The game takes place in the year 2030, in a sci-fi setting of the fictional city of Stellis. The player plays as a female defense lawyer who works with four male love interests to solve cases.

=== 2020–2022: Rise to global prominence with Genshin Impact ===
When Honkai Impact 3rd went online and achieved a measure of results in September 2016, we began to think—and continued to think for around half a year—about what our next product was going to look like. For most of the first half of 2017, we were very anxious. What sort of product would we find "exciting" and "out of imagination?" So we returned to the beginning, to the question of "what sort of game would we want to play?" During that period, the thing we were playing most was open-world games, and these games all featured huge worlds and exploration experiences that surpassed our expectations. So, since we want to play these games, and are willing to make this sort of game, why don't we just do it? It was with this simple feeling that we began working on this project in 2017. But we realized later on that we had greatly underestimated the difficulty of creating an open world.

2016年9月，《崩坏3》上线並取得一定成绩之后。在接下来半年里，我们一直在思考下一款产品应该做成什么样子。整个 2017 年上半年我们都非常地焦灼，到底做什么样的产品才会让我们自己觉得 exciting、觉得 out of imagination。这又回到了我们的初心，就是我们自己想玩什么东西。那段时间，我们玩最多的是主机的开放世界游戏，这些游戏所带来的都是非常宏大的世界观和超出预期的探索体验。那么既然我们自己想玩这样的游戏，而且又愿意去做这样的游戏，我们就去做吧。就是抱著这样一个非常简单的想法，我们从 2017 年开始做这个项目。但后来我们才发现，我们大大低估了开放世界的制作难度。

— Liu Wei, 2020

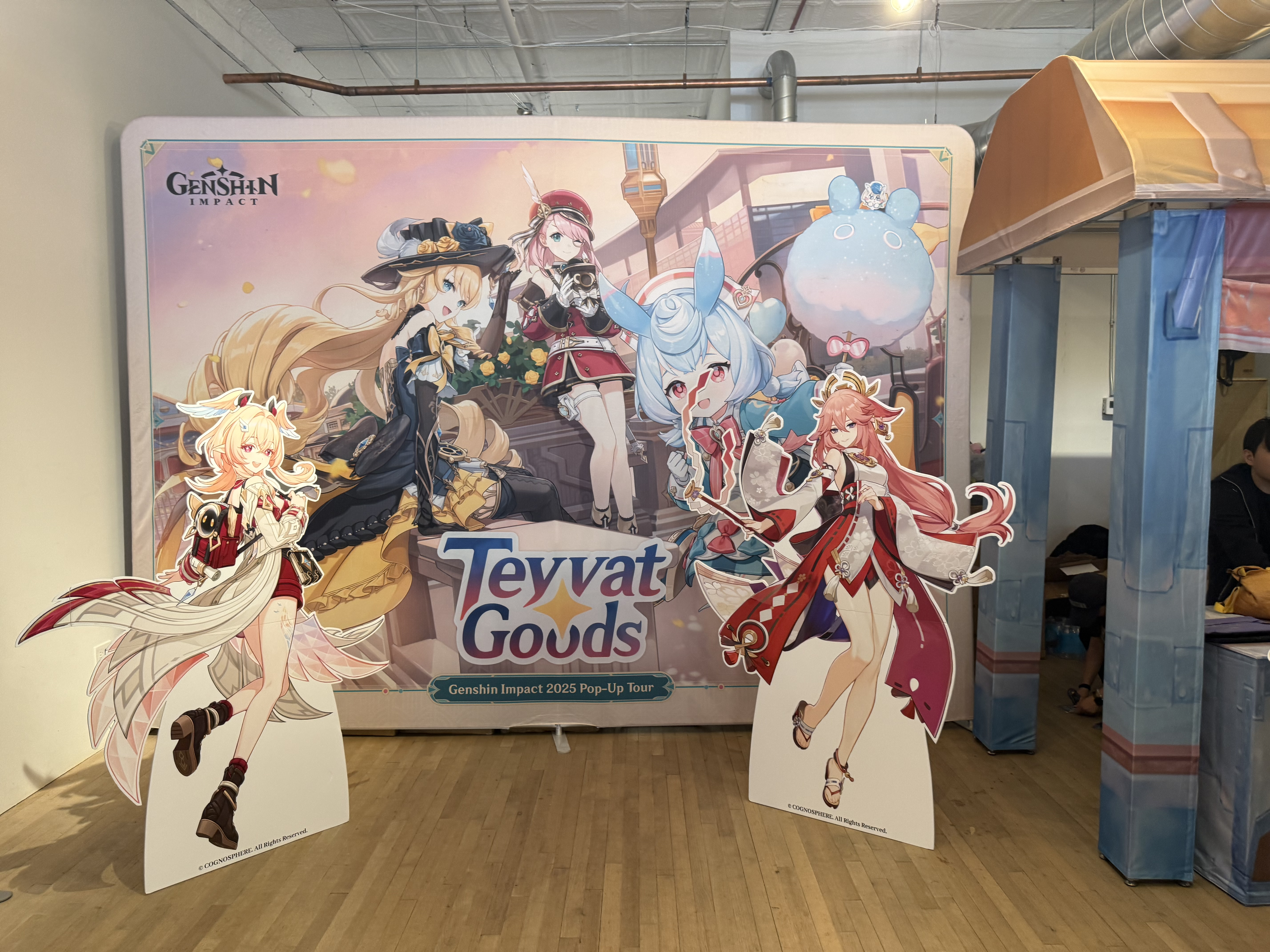
The inside of the Genshin Impact Teyvat Goods pop-up store in Chicago in 2026

Genshin Impact began its development in January 2017 with the working title "崩坏4" (pinyin: Bēnghuài 4; "Honkai 4th"). At that time, producer Cai Haoyu considered creating a new project to enhance miHoYo's core research and development capabilities and present products with significant quality improvement to players in the future. The idea of creating an open-world game came out of that. During the next seven months, the team tried several prototypes. After Cai played Nintendo's The Legend of Zelda: Breath of the Wild, the team took inspiration from the game's world exploration experience. Other inspirations came from the random events of Grand Theft Auto, the strategy in Divinity: Original Sin, and game developer Naughty Dog.

The production team initially had 150 people. They underestimated the difficulty of creating an open world, so it grew to 300 people by mid-2019, then 500 by April 2020, and then 700 by February 2021. The research and development cost of the project began with 25 million USD and then exceeded 100 million, which was recouped two weeks after the game's release. Much of the game's budget was invested in music production. Yu-Peng Chen joined the project as a music producer and composed the scores for the Mondstadt and Liyue regions. Zhang Qinghua served as the senior art director.

Genshin Impact had its first beta testing in June 2019, focused on core gameplay mechanisms and the Mondstadt region. In early 2020, the overseas promotion of the game was affected by the COVID-19 pandemic. Development also got delayed by a month as working from home was almost impossible, and employees could not access office equipment. The second beta testing came in March and featured Liyue, and then the third beta testing came in July. The game was released on 28 September 2020.

==== Lumi and N0va Desktop ====
Lumi (stylized as YoYo Lumi) is a virtual actress and YouTuber created by miHoYo, and is an attempt by miHoYo in another field of anime culture. Lumi uses Unreal Engine and motion capture technology to achieve high-quality cell-shading and rendering, as well as realistic movements, facial expressions, and skin texture. On 14 May 2020, the bilibili account "VAN0va" uploaded the first dance video "N0va LookDev Test", which was not initially announced as a miHoYo work. Later, miHoYo officially revealed its identity with Lumi on 4 August 2020, when it released the dynamic desktop wallpaper software "N0va Desktop". On 15 July 2022, Lumi launched her first live stream on bilibili, which immediately topped the bilibili live stream popularity list. The half-hour live stream attracted a total of 6.6 million viewers. Lumi is part of miHoYo's N0va Desktop project, which allows users to interact with Lumi on their desktop or mobile devices. The N0va Desktop app was released for PC in August 2020, and for Android devices in December 2020. As of mid-2024, N0va Desktop appears to have been discontinued. Its official website has been taken offline, and its X (formerly Twitter) account has shown no recent activity. Products related to HoYoverse website were removed. The associated virtual character, Lumi, also appears inactive, with her last known social media post being a YouTube video uploaded on 30 December 2024.

=== 2022–present: HoYoverse era and expansion ===
On 14 February 2022, the launch of HoYoverse, miHoYo's international division for markets outside Greater China was announced, which would be operated by a Singaporean company Cognosphere Pte., Ltd. established in 2021. Cai Haoyu served as the company's CEO. The official statement said that HoYoverse's goal is "to create and deliver immersive virtual world experiences for global players", including technology research in areas such as artificial intelligence, cloud computing, and industrial capability building. On 18 July 2022, HoYoverse announced the opening of its new headquarters in Jurong East, Singapore, which would serve as the base for its metaverse-related operations announced earlier this year. HoYoverse would build a team of hundreds of people at its Jurong East office. HoYoverse has also set up studios in Montreal, Los Angeles, Singapore, Tokyo, Seoul and other places. However, starting from 2022, some of HoYoverse's collaboration events and merchandises outside China in some regional markets still mention miHoYo, or jointly refer to "miHoYo / HoYoverse".

In September 2023, the board of directors of miHoYo passed a resolution that Cai Haoyu would no longer serve as the legal representative and chairman of miHoYo, and his position would be taken over by Liu Wei. Several media reported that Cai would move to North America, and has been interested in the large language models. miHoYo responded to the press that Cai would "continue to devote himself to the research and application of cutting-edge technology, the development of new projects, and the connection of domestic and overseas R&D resources."

==== Honkai: Star Rail ====
Honkai: Star Rail is a turn-based role-playing video game developed and published by miHoYo as part of its Honkai series. The game is set in a space fantasy universe, where the player assumes the role of a Trailblazer who follows the guidance of Akivili, the Aeon of Trailblaze, and travels across various planets using a train called the Astral Express. The game features fantasy elements with myths and legends integrated into a space sci-fi story. The game was first announced on social media on 5 October 2021, and began its "Origin Test" phase on 8 October. The game entered its "Jump Test" phase on 10 February 2023, for PC, Android and iOS platforms, and launched on 26 April 2023. The game was then ported to PlayStation 5 on 11 October 2023, with the PlayStation 4 version still yet to be announced.

==== Zenless Zone Zero ====
Zenless Zone Zero is an urban fantasy action role-playing game developed and published by miHoYo, set in a futuristic world where a strange natural disaster called the Hollows has taken place. Only one metropolis, New Eridu, managed to withstand the disaster. It leverages vital technology and resources to combat the Hollow threat. Within New Eridu, players assume the role of a Proxy, an expert adept in navigating the perilous Hollow terrains, offering guidance to those who have to enter these dangerous zones. The game released its first trailer on 13 May 2022, and opened for pre-registration and closed beta recruitment. The game had its first closed beta test, known as the "Tuning Test", on 5 August 2022. A second closed beta, known as the "Equalizing Test", was held on 24 November 2023. A third closed beta, known as the "Amplifying Test", was held on 18 April 2024. A technical test for the PS5 was announced on 9 April and was held on 25 April 2024. The game was launched simultaneously on 4 July 2024 for PC, mobile, and PS5 platforms.

==== Leaker lawsuits ====
===== Cognosphere Pte. Ltd. v. Alfredo Lopez =====
In June 2025, miHoYo sued a leaker named Alfredo Lopez in the United States District Court for the Central District of California after he allegedly streamed pre-release footage of the Honkai: Star Rail character Castorice to a Discord server with more than 12,000 members. miHoYo claimed Lopez had committed copyright infringement by distributing the unpublished game content, as Castorice had yet to be released officially at the time. miHoYo typically gives some players access to test accounts for beta testing, but generally requires them to sign non-disclosure agreements preventing them from revealing the information contained therein. The lawsuit asked for $150,000 in damages, and did not state how Lopez actually obtained the unpublished content or whether the stream occurred before the beta version was released. The company condemned him for "unauthorized dissemination of unpublished game update information" and claimed that this undermined ordinary players' expectations and gaming experience. Chinese website 4Gamers summarized miHoYo's future comments as saying that this would "negatively impact the overall gaming ecosystem". It was ruled that Lopez would only have to pay $16,500. Lopez did not appear in court, so it was unclear how the money would be obtained from him. Lopez never responded to the suit, but did comment on it on Discord saying that he was not bothered by it, saying: "They got like 3 screenshots on me". Judge André Birotte, Jr., in his ruling, criticized Lopez's lack of response to the lawsuit, but did acknowledge that Lopez removed the stream in question.

In 2025, HoYoverse made an estimated $5.38 million in damages and settlement fees from anti-leaker lawsuits.

===== Cognosphere Pte. Ltd. v. Zhou =====
In February 2026, miHoYo launched a lawsuit in the U.S. state of Georgia against a prominent leaker named "HomDGCat" for hosting a wiki containing exploited information on unpublished versions of their games between September 2023 and December 2025. Specifically, they accused HomDGCat of illegally obtaining and leaking unpublished beta content for games including Genshin Impact and Honkai: Star Rail, and demanded the closure of the wiki's website and social media accounts. The complaint stated that HomDGCat induced players bound by non-disclosure agreements to provide unpublished assets from the games, including art, dialogue and gameplay details. They also accused HomDGCat of copyright infringement and stealing trade secrets. The complaint stated that miHoYo had previously issued them warnings under the Digital Millennium Copyright Act to no avail. HomDGCat is alleged to have responded to a cease-and-desist letter, stating that they would follow "some" demands. HomDGCat later updated the wiki to state that it would only update live game data in the future.

== Games and products ==
Title	Original release date
FlyMe2theMoon	WW: 28 September 2011
Zombiegal Kawaii	CN: 14 December 2012
Guns Girl Z (Houkai Gakuen 2)	CN: 26 January 2014
Honkai Impact 3rd	CN: 14 October 2016
miHoYo BBS	CN: November 2018
HoYoLAB	WW: 16 January 2020
Tears of Themis	CN: 30 July 2020
N0va Desktop	CN: 4 August 2020
Genshin Impact	WW: 28 September 2020
Honkai: Star Rail	WW: 26 April 2023
Zenless Zone Zero	WW: 4 July 2024
Petit Planet	WW: 4 December 2026
Honkai: Nexus Anima	WW: early 2027
Nodusfall	TBD
Varsapura	TBD

== Company activities ==
=== Cultural promotion ===
In September 2020, miHoYo established strategic cooperation with Zhangjiajie to promote cultural tourism in the city with the help of Genshin Impact. The topography of Zhangjiajie's karst landscapes inspired the level designs of Jueyun Karst and Mt. Tianheng. After the agreement, two life-size Teleport Waypoints were installed at the Zhangjiajie National Forest Park and Huangshi Village (黄石寨). Next, miHoYo cooperated with Huanglong for ecological environment protection. Huanglong's multicolored pools served as the inspiration for the level design of Luhua Pool in Liyue.

=== Charity and aid ===
In November 2020, miHoYo and the China Social Welfare Foundation (中国社会福利基金会) jointly launched the Yiqi Shouhu (弈起守护) charity program. During the event, all profits from Tears of Themis charity gift packs were donated to the foundation as relief for children with autism.

On 12 July 2021, the Xinhuo Charity Program (薪火公益计划) was jointly launched by the China Youth Development Foundation and Shanghai Mihoyo Network Technology Co., Ltd. The project is committed to paying attention to and supporting the development of youth education. The first phase involved Tongzi Primary School (桐梓小学) in Yunnan Province, which got support from various aspects such as hardware conditions, educational facilities, teacher training, etc. The project also aims to provide school uniforms for all students and launch a teacher training program for seventeen primary schools in Yanjin County.

On 23 July 2021, miHoYo delivered disaster relief supplies to Xinmi County in Henan Province. Henan Province experienced flooding due to heavy rainfall, affecting hundreds of people.

In February 2022, Shanghai experienced a COVID-19 outbreak that led to a city-wide lockdown until June. In March, miHoYo responded to the critical stage of the epidemic control by purchasing batches of supplies and donating them to the Caohejing (漕河泾) and Hongmei (虹梅) communities in Xuhui District. In April, the second batch of supplies included 10,000 sets of protective equipment, 10,000 bottles of hand sanitizer gel, 40,000 N95 masks, and 100,000 pieces of disinfection wipes. miHoYo also donated pillows and peripheral products for children at a makeshift hospital at Shilong Road (石龙路). In response to employees' needs, the company distributed food packages and epidemic prevention supplies to employees affected by the lockdown. The packages included fruits, vegetables, and disinfection and protection materials. Also provided were mental health counseling services.

On 15 August 2022, miHoYo released a video about the second phase of the Xinhuo Charity Program, which showed the completed construction of Tongzi Primary School's new building from the first phase. Students can study in the multimedia classrooms of the building with upgraded hardware. Furthermore, new street lamps were installed on the campus for the safety of the students at night. The second phase also included the construction of a waterway, flush toilet, bathroom, and solar-powered water stations for the student and staff dormitory in Bazha Village Central Primary School (巴扎乡中心学校) in Qinghai Province. The construction expects completion in the second half of 2022.

In November 2022, miHoYo collaborated with the Taofen Foundation (韬奋基金会) to jointly launch the Yuejian Weiming (阅见未名) charity project. More than 37,000 books worth 2 million Yuan were donated to a number of primary schools in Dali Bai Autonomous Prefecture and Lancang Lahu Autonomous County of Yunnan Province. Aside from books, postcards written by Tears of Themis players were also given to students.

=== Investments ===
On 4 March 2021, miHoYo signed an agreement of strategic cooperation with Ruijin Hospital to build the miHoYo Joint Laboratory of Encephalopathy Center of Ruijin Hospital (瑞金医院脑病中心米哈游联合实验室), also called the Ruijin-miHoYo Laboratory. The two parties would combine their respective advantages in medical research and information technology to jointly develop brain-computer interface technology research. Lü Baoliang (吕宝粮), a professor from the Department of Computer Science and Engineering of Shanghai Jiao Tong University, heads the laboratory; he was also the supervisor of miHoYo co-founder Cai Haoyu's master's thesis. The laboratory began with the research project "Clinical Research on Brain-Computer Interface Neuromodulation and Treatment of Refractory Depression."

In early 2022, miHoYo and NIO Capital led the first funding round for Energy Singularity, raising nearly CNY 400 million. Energy Singularity was established in 2021 in Shanghai, China. The company focuses on the research and development of HTS (High-Temperature Superconductor) magnets, plasma physics, and artificial intelligence technologies to commercialize fusion energy. Using the funded capital, the company developed an experimental tokamak device, HH70, operational since 2024.

On 20 May 2022, miHoYo participated in a funding round for Oriental Space Technology (Shandong) Co., Ltd., which raised CNY 400 million. The company focuses on aerospace technology and would develop a launch vehicle and a reusable liquid oxygen and kerosene rocket engine using the raised funds. The plan was for the rocket to launch in mid-2023.

=== Committees ===
In May 2021, miHoYo established the Communist Youth League Committee under Shanghai Mihoyo Network Technology Co., Ltd. The committee aims to integrate youth into company development and partake in the innovation and publicization of traditional Chinese culture. The committee created comics and travel maps with the help of Genshin Impact material to promote Xuhui District cultural tourism landmarks. The character Paimon was formally named "Xuhui Youth Culture Star Promoter."

In September 2021, Shanghai Mihoyo Network Technology Co., Ltd. got promoted from a party branch to a party committee under the Chinese Communist Party (CCP).

On 8 July 2022, Shanghai Mihoyo Network Technology Co., Ltd. had its first trade union congress. miHoYo vice president Yin Chunbo was elected as the chairman of the first session of miHoYo's trade union committee. The meeting stated MiHoYo's establishment of a trade union not only helps safeguard the legitimate rights and interests of employees, promotes the high-quality development of enterprises and industries, but also serves the economic development of trade union organizations.

=== Rankings and certification ===
In August 2021, miHoYo Technology (Shanghai) Co., Ltd. was selected as a "Key National Cultural Export Enterprise" along with Genshin Impact as a "Key National Cultural Export Project" for the 2021–2022 period. Previously, the company and Honkai Impact 3rd was selected for those titles in 2019. The annual List of National Cultural Export Key Enterprises and Key Projects is organized by the offices of the Ministry of Commerce, Ministry of Finance, Ministry of Culture and Tourism, and the Central Propaganda Department.

In August 2022, miHoYo obtained information security certifications for ISO/IEC 27001 and ISO/IEC 27701 issued by the British Standards Institution (BSI). According to miHoYo's official announcement published in October 2022, the company had "undergone a comprehensive assessment, including strict on-site audits."

On 26 November 2021, the Internet Society of China released the China Internet Enterprise Comprehensive Strength Index (中国互联网企业综合实力指数) for 2021. miHoYo was listed as one of "China's Top 100 Internet Enterprises with Comprehensive Strength"; miHoYo ranked 23rd on the list, 1st among Shanghai game companies, and 3rd among Shanghai internet companies. It was also the fifth consecutive time miHoYo was included in the list.

On 24 November 2022, the Shanghai Cultural and Creative Industry Promotion Association (上海市文化创意产业促进会) and Shanghai First Financial Media Co., Ltd. (上海第一财经传媒有限公司)—under the guidance of the Shanghai Municipal Committee Propaganda Department—announced Shanghai Mihoyo Yingtie Technology Co., Ltd. as one of the Top Ten Cultural Enterprises, company co-founder Liu Wei as one of the Top Ten People of the Year, and Genshin Impact as one of the Top Ten Cultural Brands of Shanghai.

On 28 December 2022, Guangming Daily and Economic Daily jointly announced the "Top 30 National Cultural Enterprises" with Shanghai Mihoyo Network Technology Co., Ltd. included in the list. miHoYo was praised by Guangming Daily as "a representative scientific and technological innovation enterprise driven by Shanghai's innovation and entrepreneurship policies."

In February 2023, during the 2022 China Game Industry Annual Conference (2022年度中国游戏产业年会), hosted by the China Audio-Video and Digital Publishing Association and sponsored by the National Press and Publication Administration (NPPA), announced miHoYo as a recipient of two awards. The company was selected as one of the Top Ten "Going Global" Game Enterprises, and the game Genshin Impact as one of the Top Ten Outstanding Mobile Games. miHoYo and Genshin Impact were also nominated for several other awards.

== HoYoverse ==
Cognosphere Pte., Ltd.
- Trade name: HoYoverse
- Native name: 识隙之城私人有限公司
- Type: Division
- Industry: Video games
- Founded: 2021; 5 years ago
- Headquarters: Singapore
- Number of locations: 5
- Area served: Worldwide
- Products: HoYoLab; HoYoFair
- Parent: miHoYo
- Website: hoyoverse.com

Cognosphere Pte., Ltd. (Chinese: 识隙之城私人有限公司) stylized as COGNOSPHERE, and doing business as HoYoverse, is a publishing company based in Singapore. Established in 2021, HoYoverse handles international distribution of miHoYo's games as well as the operation of community platform HoYoLAB. The company has set up offices in Los Angeles, Montreal, Tokyo, and Seoul.

miHoYo promotes its merchandise in part by organizing pop-up retail stores in various cities around the world, including London and Chicago.

=== HoYoFair ===
HoYoverse also hosts the HoYoFair program since 2021, a semiannual online event that showcases fan made works based on Genshin Impact, Honkai: Star Rail, and Zenless Zone Zero. Some of the works that were featured on HoYoFair became popular internet memes due to their virality across multiple social media platforms because those works that were featured have millions of views. In addition, a large number of notable, well-known animators and musical artists have also had their works featured on HoYoFair.
