= ACG (subculture) =

"Anime, Comics, and Games", an Asian subculture term

ACG ("Animation, Comics, and Games") is a term used to describe some subcultures of China and East Asia. Because there is a strong economic and cultural interlinkage that exists between anime, manga, and games in Japanese and East Asian culture at large, the term ACG is an exonym used to describe this phenomenon across the different subcultures. The term refers in particular to Japanese anime, manga, and video games. The most commonly used endonym translates to "two-dimensional space" (Japanese: 2次元, romanized: nijigen); Chinese: 二次元, Pinyin: Èrcìyuán).

== Etymology ==
In 1995, a Taiwanese fan of animation and comics using the name "AIplus" established a board at National Sun Yat-sen University's BBS; the board was named the "ACG_Review Board", referring to animation, comics, and games. It is considered the first appearance of the term "ACG". Popularizing by Taiwanese anime and comics critique group Shuffle Alliance, the arrangement of the three letters was stabilized, and the term became popular in Mainland China, Hong Kong, Macau, and Taiwan.

After light novels, which are often adapted into anime, comics, and video games, became more popular, the term "ACGN" was coined, but the term ACG is still used in the majority of situations and is generally thought to include light novels even without "N".

== In other regions ==
Japanese do not use the term ACG, though a similar concept is "MAG", meaning "Manga, Anime, and Games". Japanese speakers usually use nijigen (2次元; lit. "two-dimensional space") to refer to a series of anime and manga culture (containing light novels and garage kits). The otaku culture (オタク文化, otaku bunka) refers to the related subculture, while otaku industry (オタク産業, otaku sangyō) refers to related industries.

In India, "AVGC" is used instead, meaning "Animation, Visual Effects, Gaming, and Comics".

Though the term is common in Chinese-speaking areas and East Asia, it is not prevalent in the Anglosphere.

== See also ==
- Anime and manga fandom
- Cosplay
- Doujin
- Glossary of anime and manga
- Otaku
