= Phainon (Honkai: Star Rail) =

Video game character

- Honkai character
- Official artwork
- First game: Honkai: Star Rail (2025)
- Voiced by: English: Joshua Waters; Justine Huxley (young); Chinese: Qin Qiege; Mi Yang (young); Japanese: Satoshi Hino; Kotomi Aihara (young); Korean: Yoon Yong-shik; Park Ha-jin (young)

In-universe information
- Full name: Khaslana
- Alias: NeiKos496
- Weapon: Sword
- Home: Amphoreus
- Type: Physical
- Path: Destruction

Phainon (/ˈfaɪˌnən/, FY-nin, Chinese: 白厄; pinyin: Bái'è), real name Khaslana (卡厄斯兰那; Kǎ'èsīlánnà), is a fictional character in the video game Honkai: Star Rail, developed by miHoYo. He serves as a pivotal figure in the game's Amphoreus story arc and is a member of the heroic group known as the Chrysos Heirs. Within the story, he is regarded as a savior tasked with recreating the world. Later in the narrative, it is revealed that Amphoreus has undergone thirty million repeated cycles, and that Phainon has continually borne the responsibility of preventing the birth of the Lord Ravager and Emanator of Destruction, Irontomb, repeatedly sacrificing himself in the process. Phainon first appeared in the main story in version 3.0 in January 2025, and became a playable character in version 3.4 in July.

Phainon's design is inspired by Kevin Kaslana from Honkai Impact 3rd. Phainon received positive critical reception for his tragic characterization, particularly his solitary endurance of thirty million cycles. His combat design was also described as one of the strongest in the game.

== Design and voice acting ==
Phainon first appeared in the main story as a non-player character in version 3.0 of the game in January 2025, and is one of the main characters in the Amphoreus story arc. On May 6, miHoYo released Phainon's character illustration and other basic information on their social media accounts, indicating that he would become a playable character and revealing his rarity, combat role and damage type. On June 17, the game's developers announced that the promotional livestream for version 3.4 would introduce Phainon's character details and upcoming story developments. During the livestream on June 23, further information was revealed about his combat style. Subsequently, on June 29, miHoYo released his character trailer "Coronal Radiance", using the solar corona as a metaphor to depict Phainon's solitary sacrifices across countless cycles of destruction. Phainon was officially released as a playable character on July 2 in version 3.4. On the same day, an animated short titled "Hark! There's Revelry Atop the Divine Mountain" was released, featuring the theme song "Flares of the Blazing Sun" performed by the singer YMIR. In addition, the Japanese women's magazine An An featured Phainon on the cover of a special-edition issue in June 2025. The issue included a long-form interview and Q&A, as well as a feature detailing his daily routine from waking to bedtime; official cover wallpapers were also released alongside it.

Adult Phainon is voiced in English by Joshua Waters, in Chinese by Qin Qiege, in Japanese by Satoshi Hino, and in Korean by Yoon Yong-shik. The character is voiced as a child in English by Justine Huxley, in Chinese by Mi Yang, in Japanese by Kotomi Aihara, and in Korean by Park Ha-jin. In an interview, Hino described Phainon as a young man who combines a sense of maturity with a gentle and accommodating nature. He said that Phainon seems dependable due to his role as a Chrysos Heir and savior, while also carrying a complex past shaped by the loss of his homeland. Hino specifically mentioned that shortly after meeting the protagonist Trailblazer, Phainon naturally assumes the role of a guide, introducing them to the city of Okhema. Hino argued that Phainon's willingness to help others without expecting anything in return is an important part of the character's appeal. He also said that beneath his composed demeanor lies a surprisingly competitive side. Scenes such as his contest with his friend Mydei over the number of enemies defeated or his endurance challenge in a high-temperature bathhouse reveal a contrasting facet beneath an otherwise mature exterior. When discussing his approach to performance, Hino stated that voicing Phainon was particularly demanding. Although the character is mature, gentle, calm and resolute, Hino's delivery needed to convey the weight of his past and the burden of his mission. Also, Phainon's manner of speech often carries subtle implications, appearing straightforward while carrying a hidden meaning, so Hino deliberately infused his tone with gentleness, caution and attentiveness, gradually intensifying Phainon's resolve and dramatic tension as the story progressed. He also mentioned that the wheat fields of Aedes Elysiae, Phainon's homeland, were a recurring image he envisioned during recording to enrich the character's emotional depth.

== Appearances ==
=== Story ===
Phainon is one of the central characters in the Amphoreus story arc of the game's main storyline. Amphoreus is a simulated world inspired by Ancient Greece, made of both Data and Memoria, which is enclosed within a computer system, where numerous characters establish city-states and belief systems. Its ultimate trajectory leads toward a destructive ending in which the Lord Ravager known as Irontomb is born. (Note: In the game's lore, the title "Lord Ravager" refers to those chosen by Nanook, the Aeon of Destruction, to bring destruction to the universe.) Originally created as an experimental entity, the electrical signal called NeiKos496, Phainon was born in the city of Aedes Elysiae and, a thousand years prior, joined a Titan-subjugation campaign known as the Flame-Chase Journey, led by Aglaea. He is a member of the heroic group known as the Chrysos Heirs. A prophecy foretells that he would become a savior tasked with recreating Amphoreus, as well as the final survivor who will reconstruct it on behalf of all. Recreating, in this case, refers to the process by which the Chrysos Heirs collect the necessary Coreflames to reconstruct Amphoreus; Phainon later learns that this simultaneously marks the completion of the Scepter of Irontomb.

After the Trailblazer and Dan Heng crash-land on Amphoreus, they encounter Phainon while he is rescuing refugees. They then follow him back to the sacred city of Okhema, thus becoming involved in the Flame-Chase Journey. After defeating Nikador, the Titan of Strife, Phainon's friend Mydei gives him the opportunity to inherit his Coreflame. (Note: Coreflames are the core of the Titans' power; when acquired by the Chrysos Heirs, they grant the ability to inherit said power.) However, Phainon becomes trapped within a trial while attempting to acquire the Coreflame due to his inability to overcome his inner fears, and is later rescued. Following Aglaea's death, Phainon succeeds her as the leader of the Flame-Chase Journey, and together with Hyacine, the Trailblazer and Dan Heng, defeats Aquila the Sky Titan.

When a prophecy that states "all shall bid farewell to one, and that person alone will witness the miracle" comes to pass, Phainon (having obtained the Coreflame of the World-Bearing Titan) arrives at the Vortex of Genesis, where he encounters the Flame-Reaver. He learns the truth of Amphoreus: the world is in fact in a simulated reality within the Scepter. The Scepter is a massive apparatus designed to simulate the development of civilizations and Amphoreus is the simulated world operating within it. Once the world's reconstruction is complete, an inorganic lifeform known as Irontomb, created for the purpose of destruction, will be born. Phainon and his companions are merely the "twelve factors", the core samples used by the Scepter to simulate the world's trajectory. The current Flame-Chase Journey is already the 33,550,336th recursive loop of the cycle involving Phainon's generation. Before this loop known as the "Eternal Recurrence" began, the original lifetimes of Phainon, born Khaslana, and Cyrene, after uncovering deception by a being known as Lygus, forged a closed time loop to prevent Irontomb's birth, more precisely by provoking a recursive feedback loop of their specific cycle. They agreed that Khaslana would kill Cyrene in order to draw the attention of Fuli, the Aeon of Remembrance, thereby ensuring the cycle would repeat indefinitely. In each subsequent cycle, Phainon is forced to kill Cyrene, while gathering as many Coreflames as possible and storing them within himself to prevent the world's destruction, all while waiting for an external force to enter Amphoreus. He would also confront his own new cyclical lifetimes, ending up with the Phainon who dies coming back to life as his surviving self, who would in turn recover the entirety of his memories and powers, thanks to this process of self-iteration. Eventually, Khaslana's longest lasting body collapses under the immense burden, and he chooses to reveal the truth to his subsequent lifetimes, each of whom makes the same choice after recovering the entirety of their memories. In the 33,550,336th cycle, Phainon was meant to trigger a new recursive loop as the Flame-Reaver after killing him and recovering his memories, and reach for his future self to continue the cycle; however, the Trailblazer's arrival in Amphoreus becomes the variable that disrupts this predetermined course of fate. Phainon therefore sends them back to the beginning of the cycle after triggering the loop, to search for a way to defeat Irontomb. Afterward, Phainon unleashes the power accumulated across countless cycles to confront Nanook, the Aeon of Destruction, and his followers. He loses the fight and is absorbed by Irontomb, but in the course of battle, he earns Nanook's gaze. As a result of throwing himself out of the cycle, a new lifetime of his is not born in the following loop, and he slows down the Black Tide's progress from the outside instead.

In the conclusion of the Amphoreus story arc in version 3.7, Irontomb is destroyed, the Scepter is shattered, and Amphoreus is reduced to stardust. The memories of Phainon and the other Chrysos Heirs are preserved in their entirety in the book "As I've Written". Herta confirms that Amphoreus and the Chrysos Heirs are currently being reborn as real entities in the universe based on the book, emerging from the Memory Zone, but that when exactly this process will finish remains uncertain.

=== Gameplay ===
Phainon using his ultimate to transform into his enhanced state.

Phainon is a five-star Physical character following the Path of Destruction, serving as a main DPS in gameplay. In combat, he can accumulate a resource called "Coreflame" through various means, mainly by damaging enemies or receiving buffs from allies; upon reaching a certain threshold he can activate his ultimate to enter a transformed state and deploy a special combat domain. While transformed, his teammates temporarily leave the battlefield and all enemies become more susceptible to Physical damage. Phainon switches to an alternate moveset and gains immunity to crowd control effects and cannot be killed. While in the transformed state, he gains and consumes "Scourge" to unleash high-damage skills such as "Foundation: Stardeath Verdict". Additionally, when Phainon is in the party, the maximum number of Technique Points available during exploration is increased. His Technique can instantly eliminate normal enemies within a given range on the map without triggering combat.

== Promotion ==
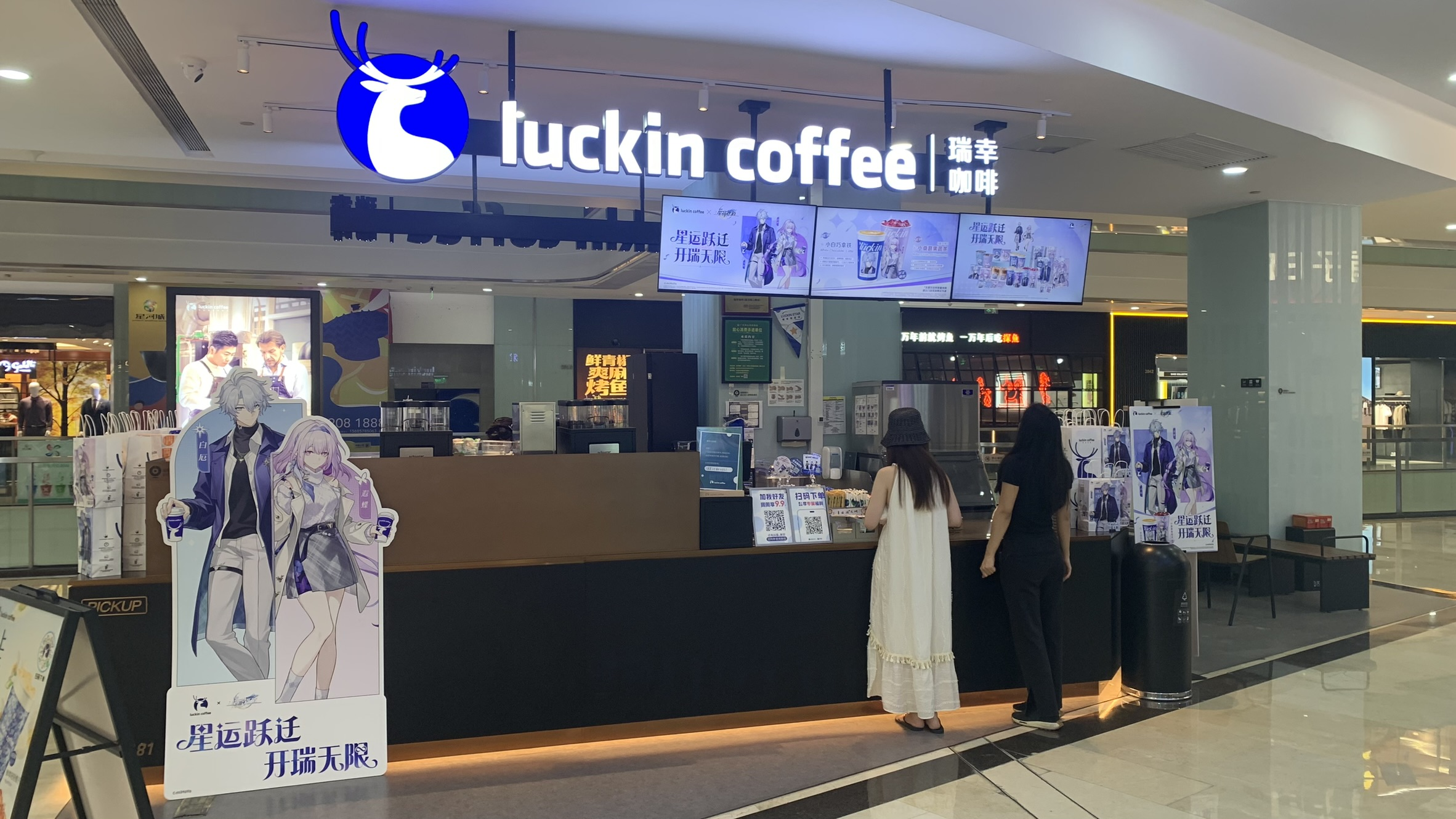
People ordering in line at a Luckin Coffee branch during a Honkai: Star Rail collaboration event.

In July 2025, Good Smile Company unveiled a nendoroid figure of Phainon which came with three accessories: wings, a sword and a mobile phone. It is scheduled to be released in China in May 2026 and in other territories at a later date. That September, he and fellow Chrysos Heir Castorice were used as part of a collaboration between the game and the Chinese chain coffee brand Luckin Coffee. In November of the same year, the music video for Japanese voice actor Mamoru Miyano's song "Zero Light" was released, with Phainon and the other Chrysos Heirs as the theme. In the visual feed, Phainon can be seen facing a threat, while Tribbie and the other Chrysos Heirs stand behind him in support.

== Reception ==
Phainon's character banner performed strongly commercially. According to data from Sensor Tower, his initial banner generated approximately ¥1,800,000,000 on the Japanese App Store alone, and topped app charts in both China and Japan. Pocket Tactics reviewer Holly Alice suggested that he may be one of the game's most successful banners to date, and said she was excited by Phainon's success in particular because of the idea that male character banners tend to do worse than those for female characters in gacha games, and that a lot of players tend to collect waifu characters. A TapTap review further noted that, despite releasing in a transitional version following the game's anniversary and before a collaboration with Fate/stay night, Phainon still propelled version 3.4 to the top of the iOS sales charts on its first day. The article attributed this success to long-term narrative buildup, his highly distinctive transformation visuals, and the synergistic promotional impact between his banner and the climax of the story. Meanwhile, reviewer Qian Hongyan of Jinghe, in a retrospective analysis of Honkai: Star Rail's continued use of "expies" (characters exported from other games) within the wider Honkai series, identified Phainon alongside Acheron as version-defining characters who simultaneously carry major narrative weight and commercial appeal, arguing that such characters constitute, to an extent, one of the game's "winning formulas".

Phainon's portrayal in the narrative received positive critical reception. Pocket Tactics reviewer Daz Skubich described the story as the game's best until that point, writing that the arc fundamentally concerns Phainon and Cyrene, with the Trailblazer functioning more as a witness and supporter who guides Phainon at key moments. Skubich added that he initially distrusted Phainon and even found him somewhat bland early on; however, his view changed completely once it was revealed that, in order to prevent Irontomb's creation, Phainon absorbed all twelve Coreflames into himself and repeatedly reset the timeline across many cycles. He also argued that Cyrene serves as a narrative counterbalance to Phainon's heroic complex; her gentle and comforting presence tempering his tendency to shoulder excessive burdens. DBLTAP reviewer Marco Wutz characterized the first half of the Amphoreus story arc as a heroic narrative framed within the traditions of classical tragedy and myths. He noted that while version 3.4 lacked the scale of version 3.3, it instead focused more closely on the intimate drama between Phainon, Cyrene, Lygus, and the Trailblazer. Wutz further observed that, over thirty-three million cycles, Phainon repeatedly gathered the Coreflames to prevent the Chrysos Heirs from inadventently triggering the end of the world, gradually shifting from initially attempting to obtain them peacefully to increasingly ruthless methods. This prolonged erosion forced Phainon to repeatedly murder his companions and strip away his own humanity, creating what Wutz described as a powerful irony in that a character seeking to be a hero instead had to play the villain to secure a victory. Wutz concluded that version 3.4 successfully established Phainon's status as a central character while providing a necessary and hopeful foundation for the latter half of the Amphoreus arc. Dengeki Online reviewer Enbato Roku focused on the sense of immersion enabled by the game medium, arguing that version 3.4 allows players to directly control a story-scale version of Phainon (Khaslana) within the main narrative — advancing forward, enduring damage, and continuing to fight — thereby creating a contradictory experience in which players want to progress the story but can't bear pressing forward, which makes the character's tragedy more palpable. She also noted that the gameplay flow, which makes Phainon keep moving forward with no option to stop or turn back more vividly conveys the pain of the burden of salvation with no possibility of release. Other fan theories indicate that Phainon was a friend of Cyrene's as shown in one of the game's cutscenes.

Sina Esports also discussed Phainon from the perspective of the long-term narrative buildup of the Amphoreus story arc. Sina Esports, meanwhile, argued that the strong reception Phainon received in version 3.4 was largely due to the developers' sustained characterization of his growth from an inexperienced youth to a composed leader over the course of four versions, allowing the eventual revelation of the truth and his sacrificial choice to carry substantial emotional burdens.

Kevin Kaslana from Honkai Impact 3rd, pictured above for reference

In terms of character design, Phainon's appearance is inspired by Kevin Kaslana from Honkai Impact 3rd. Pocket Tactics reviewer Daz Skubich saw a clear visual connection between the two, and wrote that the five-letter name censored in his initial reveal artwork further hinted at the relation. Game Rant reviewer Paolo Josiel Arias likewise stated that developments in the version 3.4 storyline confirmed this speculation. At an educational presentation in China, HoYoverse also revealed that Phainon throwing meteors while transformed in combat was inspired by the Marvel Cinematic Universe's Thanos using the Infinity Gauntlet to throw pieces of the moon at his enemies, wrote Marco Wutz.

Screen Rant reviewer Hannah Diffey said that released concept materials indicate Phainon's creation not only draws from the character Himmel in the manga and anime series Frieren: Beyond Journey's End, but also incorporates elements of Satoru Gojo from Jujutsu Kaisen. She argued that, like Himmel, Phainon is not a savior chosen by fate, but rather someone who chose to become a hero through empathy and effort. Both characters share a humble temperament that is shaped by loss and resilience beneath an outward layer of charisma. By contrast, she observed that Gojo's influence on Phainon is primarily reflected in visual and emotional aspects, namely, overwhelming power, a strong sense of isolation, and the paradox of being admired by others while also constrained by one's own potential. This combination gives Phainon a dual identity as both an idealistic hero and a tragic, godlike figure that unites thematic tensions of fate versus defiance and power versus loneliness in one character.

Following the release of his trailer, The Times of India also analyzed Phainon's tragedy from a symbolic perspective, describing him as layered, warm, and deeply tragic. The article interprets the number 33,550,336 as a record of his suffering, accumulated through countless cycles, suggesting that Amphoreus' repeated resets have gradually eroded Phainon's humanity and will. Additionally, elements in the trailer, like the golden liquid flowing from his hand while wielding the Flame-Reaver's weapon, his gradual transformation into a form with clawlike limbs and fractured light effects and the collapsing, distorted backdrop are read as visualizations of his descent from a "savior" to Irontomb, depicting his internal shift from responsibility to collapse.

Phainon's gameplay design received positive critical reception. Siliconera reviewer Jenni Lada described him as the game's strongest damage dealer, writing that his combat kit makes him ideal for a wide range of players. Skubich similarly remarked that Phainon felt unfair to use in battle, suggesting that he has the potential to surpass Acheron in terms of popularity. According to Sina Esports, Phainon's transformation, greatsword attacks, and full-screen meteor effects quickly became a major topic of discussion among players; many described him as an "army of one" due to his solo-combat design. Real Sound reviwer Mitsuhiro Katamura observed that, although Phainon's design was highly specialized due to his solo-combat phase of eight additional actions, he did not feel overly clunky in practice because of his immunity to action restrictions and his inability to be defeated when his hit points reach zero while transformed. Katamura also said that Phainon's combat presentation stands out even among the game's other characters. Enbato Ruku likewise commented that controlling Phainon in his transformed state felt akin to directly playing as a boss character. She further argued that Phainon retains previously gained buffs even when he is the only character on the field, giving him a degree of team flexibility for players with more limited characters at their disposal. GameSpace reviewer Catherine Daro described Phainon as representing the peak of single-carry gameplay and praised his accessibility for free-to-play players, while also arguing that his fixed eight-turn transformation cycle can feel repetitive due to lack of strategic variation. Kakuchopurei reviewer Jonathan Toyad also characterized Phainon as a powerful offensive unit and complimented his accessibility for newer and free-to-play players.
