= Castorice =

Fictional character in Honkai: Star Rail

- Honkai character
- Official artwork
- First game: Honkai: Star Rail (2025)
- Voiced by: EN: Melody Muze; ZH: Ruan Congqing; JA: Chiwa Saitō; KO: Serena Lee

In-universe information
- Alias: EpieiKeia216
- Weapon: Scythe
- Home: Amphoreus
- Type: Quantum
- Combat Path: Remembrance

Castorice (/ˈkæsˌtərəs/, CAST-er-iss, Chinese: 遐蝶; pinyin: Xiádié; lit. 'distant butterfly') is a character in the video game Honkai: Star Rail, developed by miHoYo. In the game, she is the demigod of death and one of the key figures in the story arc that takes place on the fictional planet called Amphoreus. She is afflicted with a curse that kills any living thing that comes into contact with her, and serves as an executioner because of this. She was released in version 3.2 of the game in April 2025.

The character has received generally positive reviews from players and critics; commentators praised her character development centered around death and the tragic tone of her promotional videos, and also discussed her storyline involving the "dead dragon" Pollux. Her gameplay design, which sacrifices the entire team's health to maximize damage output and prevent teammates from dying, has also been well-received.

== Design and voice acting ==
Castorice made her first appearance ingame in version 3.0, which was released on January 15, 2025, with the release of the Greek mythology-inspired planet of Amphoreus. On March 31, miHoYo released a 2D hand-drawn short film titled The Long Night of Serenity which featured Castorice and explained her backstory. She was released in version 3.2 of the game on April 8 alongside her signature Light Cone, "Make Farewells More Beautiful". Her English name is derived from Castor, one of the stars of the Gemini constellation in Greek mythology, and is a feminine version of that name.

Castorice is voiced in Japanese by Chiwa Saitō. In an interview, Saitō stated that Castorice is one of the heroes of Amphoreus, and that she appears quite delicate, however in battle she wields a giant scythe and summons a dragon to fight alongside her. She said that the curse, known as the touch of death, profoundly affects her way of life; when Castorice first appears, she asks others to keep their distance not out of coldness but to prevent others from being harmed by it. Saitō believes that Castorice, seemingly cold on the outside, actually cares about those around her, and that this concern for others despite being unable to control the curse is part of her charm. She also mentioned that Castorice enjoys reading, writing, and arts and crafts; these hobbies fit the character's fragile image and reflect her inability to deeply connect with life due to the curse. During recording sessions, Saitō deliberately avoided portraying Castorice with large emotional fluctuations, instead expressing emotions via pauses, breathing, and variations in tone; for example, adding a brief silence when someone tries to approach her, and slightly emphasizing her tone when stating her goal. She also mentioned that the scene in the main story where Castorice walks and takes pictures with the protagonist, the Trailblazer, is impressive. Castorice's preference for black-and-white photography allows people to see her values in the details of daily life, as well as her enjoyment of life outside of her duties.

Melody Muze provides Castorice's voice in English. In an interview, Muze described Castorice as reserved, soft-spoken, and nervous, but stressed that she does not lack emotion. Beneath her association with death, Muze argued that Castorice is in fact full of life; her excitement about photography shows that she has much more of a personality than she initially shows. Muze characterized Castorice as someone who wants connections, but is prevented from getting too close to people for fear of hurting them. She related personally to Castorice because serious health problems once left her isolated and unable to fully experience life. She uses those memories to understand the character's loneliness and insecurity. Portraying Castorice required small fluctuations of fear, excitement and vulnerability to show at times while also making sure Castorice appeared outwardly restrained. Muze cried when recording certain intense scenes. She indicated that she views Castorice's relationship with Phainon, her fellow Chrysos Heir, as sibling-like, with Phainon acting like a teasing older brother, and she said she appreciated that the characters from Amphoreus treat her with respect despite knowing about the curse. Muze hoped that Castorice would eventually accept herself and her connection to death, leave Amphoreus, explore the wider universe, and learn to live life to the fullest. Overall, Muze considered Castorice a nuanced, well-written character whose central contradiction is that she embodies death while possessing a profound love for life. Castorice is voiced in Chinese by Ruan Congqing, and in Korean by Serena Lee.

== Appearances ==
=== Story ===
Castorice was originally designed as an experimental entity called "EpieiKeia216". Amphoreus is a world caught in a cycle of recurrence; the Chrysos Heirs are an organization whose mission is to seize the authority of the Twelve Titans, become demigods, save Amphoreus, and complete its "re-creation". (Note: In the setting of Amphoreus, Titans are divine beings who hold various authorities; demigods are people who acquire a Titan’s authority and inherit their power.) In a previous life, Castorice was the twin sister of Polyxia, the demigod of Death. In order for Polyxia to pass her trial, Castorice chose to sacrifice herself, leading Polyxia to revive her sister in the next life. At the beginning of the present cycle, Polyxia, who had reincarnated as Thanatos, the Titan of Death, used alchemy taught to her by Calypso, the former demigod of Reason, to resurrect Castorice at the cost of her own life. Because alchemy follows the principle of equivalent exchange, the authority of the Titan of Death was split in two: Thanatos's remains blocked the entrance to the River of Souls, preventing the souls of the dead from entering the nether realm for thousands of years, while Castorice gained the power to "grant death", causing any living being she touched to die. After her rebirth, Castorice, who had no memories of her previous life, eventually arrived in Aidonia, a city-state that worshiped the Titan of Death, where she was revered as a goddess. The curse caused her long-term suffering, but also made her a respected executioner and saint in Aidonia. Because she could not touch others without killing them, she lost many of the ordinary joys of life that most people take for granted, and this caused her personality to appear shy. Later, Castorice went to the holy city of Okhema and joined the Chrysos Heirs, who were tasked with saving Amphoreus, setting out on the Flame-Chase Journey. (Note: "Coreflame" refers to a power containing a Titan's authority; the journey in which the Chrysos Heirs obtain Coreflames and inherit the Titans' authorities is known as the "Flame-Chase Journey.")

In the main story, after the Trailblazer and Dan Heng arrive in Amphoreus, Aglaea, leader of the Chrysos Heirs, treats them as dangerous outsiders and orders Castorice to execute them if they lie during questioning. Castorice outwardly obeys, but Phainon, another Chrysos Heir, soon intervenes and argues that the two had helped defend the city, which was enough to prove they were not a threat. Castorice therefore argues that they should be spared; the story later reveals that she had sent someone to bring Phainon before the interrogation began, outwardly obeying Aglaea's order while actually trying to prevent the execution; she later apologized to the Trailblazer and Dan Heng for this. Castorice later travels to the nether realm at the urging of another Chrysos Heir, Anaxa. In the River of Souls, she encounters lingering souls and learns that the curse of death did not come from the "Dead Dragon" Pollux as she had originally thought, but from the split authority of Death. She later frees Thanatos's remains, meets Polyxia's soul, and learns the full truth of their past and present lives. Polyxia gives the Coreflame of Death to Castorice, making her the new demigod of death. To atone for the mistake Polyxia made earlier and watch over the River of Souls, Castorice decides to remain in the nether realm and ferry the souls that had been barred from entering it for thousands of years.

=== Gameplay ===
Castorice is a five-star rarity Quantum damage dealer who walks the Path of the Remembrance. Her Basic Attack deals Quantum damage to a single enemy. One of her Talents, "Sanctuary of Mooncocoon", takes effect immediately after obtaining Castorice regardless of whether she is on the team; once per battle, when a fatal blow is received by an ally, all allied characters who would otherwise be downed enter the "Mooncocoon" state and take actions normally, delaying becoming downed. Before the start of the next turn, if their current hit points increase or if they gain a shield, the "Mooncocoon" state is removed; they will otherwise be downed immediately. Her Skill consumes a percentage of all allies' current hit points and deals a significant amount of damage to an enemy proportional to Castorice's maximum hit points; If her memosprite is on the field, they jointly attack the target instead. (Note: Memosprites are a type of familiar or summon belonging to characters who follow the Path of Remembrance.) Her ultimate summons her memosprite, Netherwing (a dragon), and advances its action.

== Promotion ==
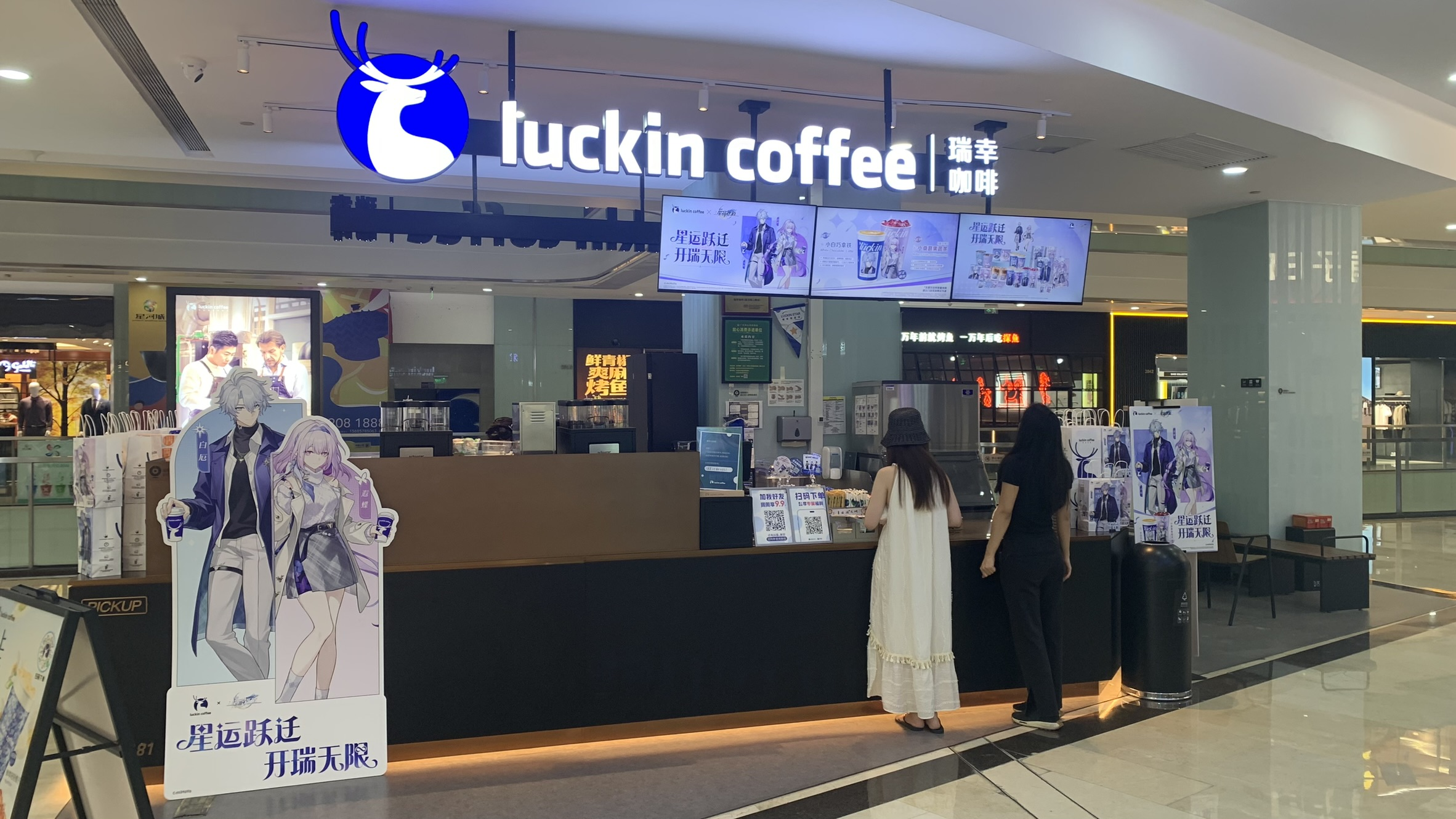
People ordering in line at a Luckin Coffee branch during a Honkai: Star Rail collaboration event.

In April 2025, miHoYo launched a collaboration with the Japanese convenience store chain Lawson, in which clear files and stickers centered around Castorice and other Chrysos Heirs were released, and Castorice also made in-store announcements. miHoYo released a figure of Castorice playing the harp in July 2025, after a concert in May which featured music from the game and for which Castorice was displayed on promotional materials. The Chinese coffee brand Luckin Coffee released merchandise including gift bags and drinkware with Castorice and Phainon on them in autumn 2025. The two characters received modern outfits in the promotional art for the collaboration, and Castorice received a handbag, sweater and skirt, the former of which writer Holly Alice of Pocket Tactics characterized as cute. She doubted the collaboration would be available outside of China, and hoped that miHoYo would release the designs as skins in the game.

== Reception and impact ==
Castorice was generally received well by players and critics. Fans have expressed their appreciation by cosplaying as her. The game saw a significant increase in sales revenue following her release, and by April 14 it occupied the top slot in the Google Play Store sales list, according to data from Sensor Tower; Gamebiz speculated that this success was due to Castorice's release.

=== Characterization and story ===
Writer Jisuroma of Denfaminico Gamer wrote that, despite Castorice receiving heavy promotion, they initially found it hard to understand what kind of character she was meant to be. Once Chiwa Saitō was revealed as her Japanese voice actress, however, they felt the intended character image immediately became clear. Jisuroma wrote that pairing Saitō's voice with Castorice's appearance made the character's direction instantly legible, calling miHoYo's casting choice "just too otaku" and saying that Saitō's voice alone made Castorice feel charged with dramatic potential.

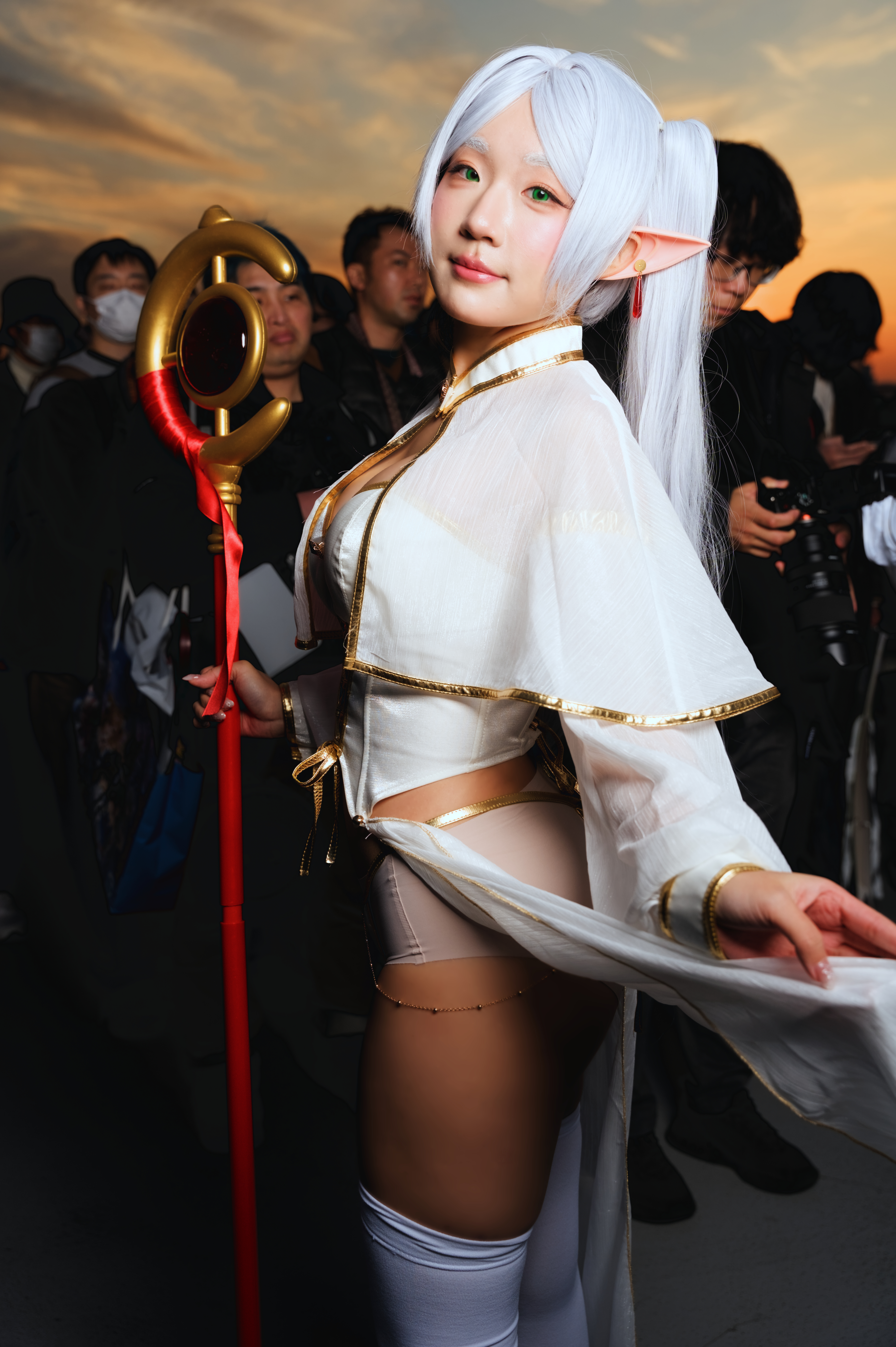
Cosplays of Castorice (left) and of Frieren (right), to whom Castorice was compared due to their similar appearance

Bruno Yonezawa of Screen Rant criticized Castorice's design as too similar to that of another character, Fu Xuan, because both characters have pink hair, head garments, and pink-and-white dresses with long white sleeves. He said it was as if Fu Xuan had an alternative outfit instead of a separate character. He also correctly speculated that Castorice's memosprite would be a dragon. Fu Xuan was not the only character to whom Castorice was compared, as according to INSIDE, when Castorice was implemented in version 3.2 of the game, she also appeared in issue 19 of Weekly Shonen Sunday, released on the same day. The magazine's official Twitter account therefore posted that she was similar to the titular protagonist from Frieren, while the official Honkai: Star Rail account replied that both characters are powerful women who have lived for over a thousand years and have distinctive long ears. The official account for Frieren later posted a Venn diagram listing similarities between the two, including longevity, strength, long ears, death-related titles, and a love of reading; the differences were that Frieren fights or runs away from dragons while Castorice summons them to fight. Dengeki Online reported that the interaction between the official accounts caused the term "Frieren collaboration" to trend on Twitter, and wrote that it would be amusing to see the characters from Frieren appear in Honkai: Star Rail's "beautiful graphics".

Castorice's story was received mostly positively. After her trailer was released, many players worried that her story would be too tragic for their expectations. Yonezawa praised Pollux's design as one of the game's best so far for an NPC, and for bringing representation to the game because the character uses a wheelchair. He theorized that it was possible that Pollux may be Castorice's memosprite in humanoid form.

Castorice's promotional trailers and other videos were generally well-received. Editor MrSun of Yahoo News Taiwan praised the animation quality of her trailer and stated that people were asking when miHoYo would release a feature-length animation based on it. The character's English name "Castorice" was originally supposed to be a female version of "Castor", but players broke it down into "castor" and "rice", resulting in memes which involve her cooking or eating rice. This can even be seen in collaborations and videos; one April Fools' Day video posted by miHoYo even had her in a chef's uniform. One Sohu author interpreted the fact that her name possibly referred to castor oil in English as Castorice preferring to use it to fry rice. Castor oil is generally used for medicinal or industrial purposes, so commentors pointed out that they were not surprised that rice fried thusly would taste strange.

=== Gameplay ===
Castorice's gameplay was received very well by reviewers and critics. Yonezawa called her "the most controversial character yet" because of a leaked mechanic that would boost Castorice's power the lower her hit points were. X.C. Enriquez of Esports wrote that Castorice was "broken" due to the Sanctuary of Mooncocoon, which he characterized as negating death for the entire team. Similarly, Daz Skubich of Pocket Tactics called Castorice an "incredibly valuable character to have" due to her ability to revive characters, which he classified as "ridiculously strong".
