= Acheron (Honkai: Star Rail) =

Video game character

- Honkai character
- Official artwork
- First game: Honkai: Star Rail (2024)
- Voiced by: EN: Allegra Clark; ZH: Juhuahua; JA: Miyuki Sawashiro; KO: Park Ji-yoon

In-universe information
- Full name: Raiden Bosenmori Mei
- Weapon: Sword
- Home: Izumo
- Type: Lightning
- Path: Nihility

Acheron (/ˈæˌkər.ɔːn/, ACK-er-on; Chinese: 黄泉; pinyin: Huángquán), real name Raiden Bosenmori Mei (雷电忘川守芽衣; Léidiàn Wàngchuānshǒu Yáyī), is a character in the video game Honkai: Star Rail, developed by miHoYo. She was released as a playable character in version 2.1 of the game on March 27, 2024. In the game, she is a drifter who claims to be a Galaxy Ranger, a vigilante who fights for justice and to protect the innocent. She is later revealed to be an "Emanator of Nihility": a person granted extraordinary powers by an Aeon, a godlike being that embodies the belief that existence has no inherent meaning.

She was received well by players and critics, who praised her storytelling and characterization. Commentary on Acheron focused on her mysterious identity, the production of her promotional trailers, and her similarities to characters from earlier miHoYo games.

== Characterization ==
Acheron has a somewhat pessimistic view of the world. She has issues with forgetfulness; she also experiences time in a not necessarily linear fashion. She carries a long sword reminiscent of an ōdachi , a large Japanese sword. Acheron is voiced in English by Allegra Clark, in Chinese by Juhuahua, in Japanese by Miyuki Sawashiro, and in Korean by Park Ji-yoon. Sawashiro said that Acheron reveals little about herself, although the reason for her reticence was not yet clear. She also described the character as having a lighter side, reflected in her fondness for peaches. The development team characterized her as cold, reserved, and powerful.

== Appearances ==
=== Story ===
On Acheron’s home planet, Izumo, its inhabitants repeatedly forged weapons to fight monsters, trapping the world in a cycle of destruction and rebirth. Concluding that the struggle was futile, Acheron forged a final blade and used it to end the cycle. In doing so, she unknowingly became an Emanator of Nihility — someone able to draw extraordinary power from a godlike being, known as an Aeon, associated with nothingness and the belief that existence has no inherent meaning.

In the game's main story, Acheron meets the protagonist, the Trailblazer, in the dream world on the planet Penacony and guides them toward an exit. She claims to be a member of the Galaxy Rangers, a group of interstellar vigilantes, but this is later revealed to be false. She tells the Trailblazer that they remind her of someone from her past. Acheron later helps investigate the hidden layers of Penacony's dreamscape and expresses regret when she is unable to prevent the apparent death of Firefly, one of the Trailblazer's allies. During a confrontation engineered by the corporate executive Aventurine, she reveals the extent of her power by cutting through the dreamscape and defeating him with a single sword strike.

=== Gameplay ===
In gameplay, Acheron is designed as a DPS who uses lightning-based sword attacks. Her attacks mark enemies and build charges. After accumulating nine charges, she can strike all enemies at once, dealing greater damage to targets carrying more marks.

== Promotion and release ==
miHoYo first introduced Acheron during winter 2023–2024 as a galactic traveler and drifter. More information about Acheron was released on March 18, 2024, when miHoYo released her character trailer. In it, the character Black Swan muses about Acheron's identity and motives and speculates on who she really is. miHoYo released another trailer on March 22, in which hints of her mysterious past were revealed. On March 25, her combat trailer, "Your Color", was released. Acheron was released as a playable character in version 2.1 of the game on March 27, 2024.

In April 2024, miHoYo collaborated with the eyewear brand Zoff to launch a series of co-branded eyewear for Aventurine, Kafka, Dan Heng and Acheron. In October, the company's flagship store on the Chinese platform TMall released apparel inspired by Acheron that included bracelets, chokers, jackets, keycaps and umbrellas.

== Reception ==
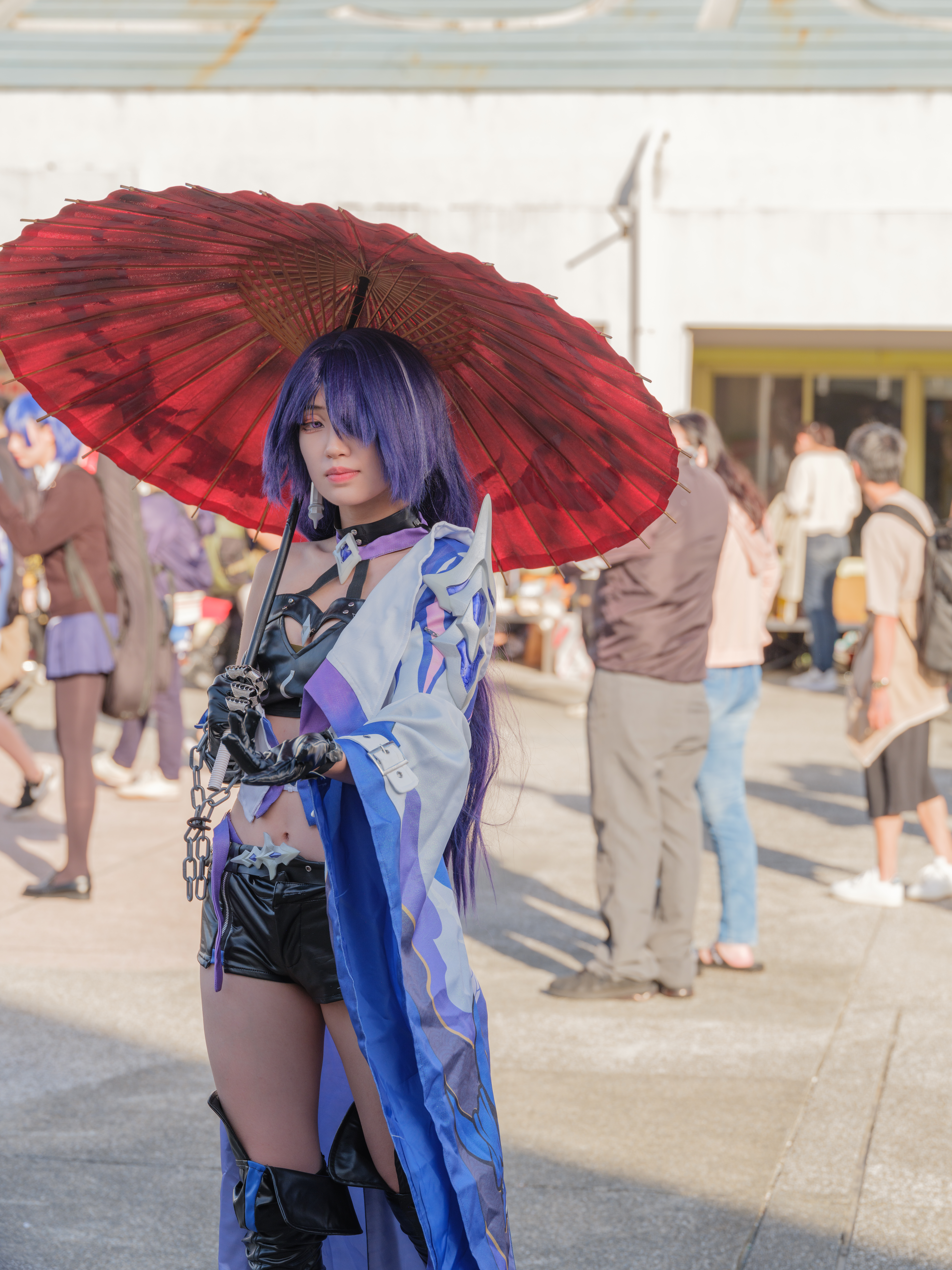
An Acheron cosplayer at the 2024 Asian Animation Creation Exhibition

Acheron was generally received positively. Commentary on Acheron focused on the production of her trailers, the clues surrounding her identity, and her similarities to characters from earlier miHoYo games. Fans have expressed their appreciation by cosplaying as her. Sensor Tower data reported that the game's revenue increased from February to March 2024, the month in which Acheron became playable.

Acheron's trailers were received well. Hilo of United Daily News described "Your Color" as an unusually elaborate character trailer for the game and praised its production quality. They praised the quality of the trailer, stating that it allowed players to appreciate Acheron better. Stephanie Liu of Siliconera identified casting and visual references to Honkai Impact 3rd and Guns Girl Z, including similarities between Acheron's appearance and imagery from the earlier games.

Acheron has been viewed as cryptic and mysterious by critics. Writer Marco Wutz said that there appeared to be crying heard in Acheron's ultimate, writing that players had taken to giving her the nickname "the developers' favorite child", and they had been theorizing about her identity as an Emanator of Nihility since version 2.0 of the game. Wutz speculated that Acheron became so depressed that she stepped on the Path of Nihility, despite hating the idea of nothingness. Wutz speculated that Acheron behaves as if she already knows what will come to pass in the future; in other words, that she experiences a time loop. Her actions, he wrote, suggest precognition but a limited ability to change the future. Before the game confirmed Acheron's connection to Nihility, Yan Ku argued for that interpretation based on her behavior and a symbol in her promotional artwork.

Several writers discussed Acheron as a counterpart to recurring Raiden characters in miHoYo's other games. Writer Willa Rowe of Kotaku called it a "doozy of a reveal" and compared Raiden Mei to characters with the name "Raiden" in other miHoYo games, such as the Raiden Shogun in Genshin Impact. She wrote that the "Raiden" characters were all "some version of each other" and indicated that the dialogue between Acheron and the Trailblazer hinted heavily at the events of Honkai Impact 3rd. She said that Acheron is not the same Raiden Mei that appears in that game, but rather an alternate-universe version of her. Fans had already begun theorizing about her identity prior to the reveal due to the similarities between Acheron, Raiden Mei and the Raiden Shogun. Rowe went further, comparing one of the game's cutscenes showing Acheron reaching out to the Trailblazer as they fall through the air to a similar shot from Honkai Impact 3rd in which Raiden Mei did the same to that game's protagonist, Kiana Kaslana. One writer for Game Grape concurred, saying that miHoYo frequently copies characters between games to evoke a sense of déjà vu. PCGamesN writer Whitney Meers speculated that Acheron was Raiden Mei's counterpart, or an expy, in Honkai: Star Rail. She added that Acheron is not the first character from the wider Honkai series to be included in Honkai: Star Rail, as the characters Himeko and Luocha both have counterparts in the game as well. Liu said she saw Raiden Mei appear in "Your Color", before it was revealed that it was actually Robin.
