= Joshua Waters (voice actor) =

American voice actor (born 2001)

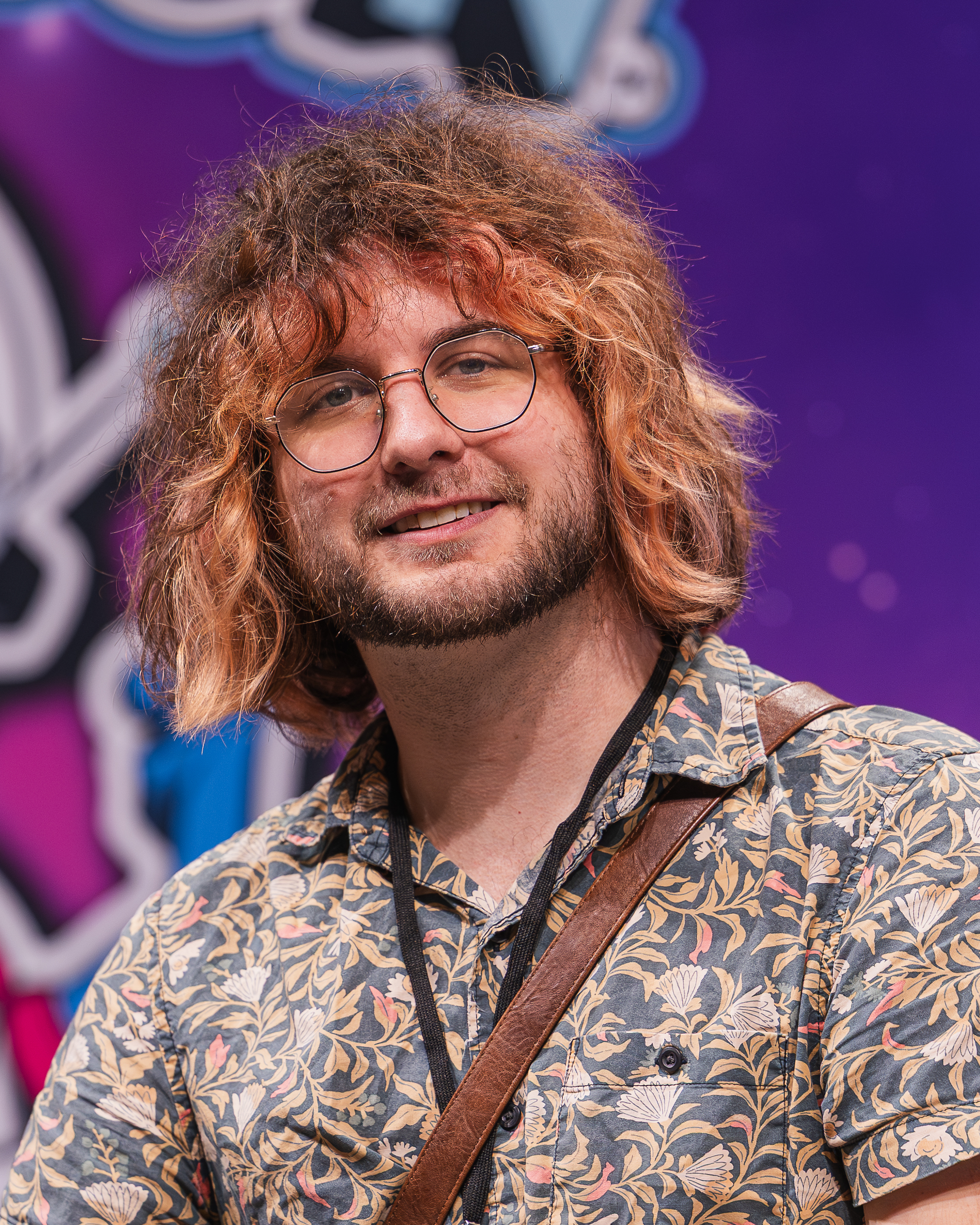
- Waters at GalaxyCon Oklahoma City in 2026
- Born: October 6, 2001 (age 24); Ohio, U.S.
- Occupation: Voice actor
- Years active: 2017–present
- Notable credits: Honkai: Star Rail as Phainon; Lord of Mysteries as Klein Moretti; Sentenced to Be a Hero as Dotta Luzulas; Witch Hat Atelier as Qifrey
- Spouse: Minh Ton (m. 2026)
- Website: www.joshawatersvoices.com

Joshua A. Waters (born October 6, 2001) is an American voice actor known for their work in anime and video games.

== Biography ==
Joshua A. Waters was born in Ohio on October 6, 2001. Waters is non-binary. They reside in Texas.

Waters won the Best Voice Acting in a Mobile Game award at the 2025 GaminginPhone Awards. Vamsi Krishna of FandomWire praised their casting as Klein Moretti in Lord of Mysteries, arguing that Waters was well-suited for the role. They voiced various characters such as Steve Cobs in Inanimate Insanity, Shuto Sendo from Blue Lock, and Mullan Sero from Pass the Monster Meat, Milady!. At 6th Astra TV Awards in 2026, Waters was nominated in the Best Supporting Voice-Over Performance category for their role as Qifrey in Witch Hat Atelier.

As of June 2026, Waters is married to fellow voice actor Minh Ton.

== Filmography ==
=== Anime ===
Year	Title	Role	Notes	Ref
2021	Ishida & Asakura	Mitsunori Ishida		
2022	Tribe Nine	The Quadruplets		
2022	Sasaki and Miyano	Yoshikazu Miyano		
2022	The Prince of Tennis II	Kuranosuke Shiraishi		
2022	Given	Yagi Shizusumi		
2022	Blue Lock	Shuto Sendo		
2024	Twilight Out of Focus	Hisashi Otomo		
2024	Alya Sometimes Hides Her Feelings in Russian	Hikaru Kiyomiya		
2024	Nina the Starry Bride	Bidoh		
2025	Medalist	Rintaro Chiwa		
2025	Zenshu	Soldiers, animator		
2025	Headhunted to Another World	Dennosuke Uchimura		
2025	The Ossan Newbie Adventurer	Raster Diarmuit		
2025	My Hero Academia: Vigilantes	Soga Kugisaki		
2025	Gachiakuta	Tribesfolk		
2025	May I Ask for One Final Thing?	Dios Westwood		
2025	Pass the Monster Meat, Milady!	Mullan Sero		
2025	Gnosia	Raqio		
2026	Sentenced to Be a Hero	Dotta Luzulas		
2026	Hana-Kimi	Minami Nanba		
2026	In the Clear Moonlit Dusk	Kohaku Ichimura		
2026	Witch Hat Atelier	Qifrey		
2026	Go For It, Nakamura!	Kōsei Matsumura		

=== Films ===
Year	Title	Role	Notes	Ref
2022	Inu-Oh	Inu-Oh		
2024	Sasaki and Miyano: Graduation	Yoshikazu Miyano		

=== Animation ===
Year	Title	Role	Notes	Ref
2020	Death Battle	Wally West		
2024	Inanimate Insanity	Steve Cobs, Goo, Bookcasey, Poppy		
2024	Chikn Nuggit	Onyn Ring		
2024	Ramshackle	Stone		
2025	Lord of Mysteries	Klein Moretti		

=== Video games ===
Year	Title	Role	Notes	Ref
2017	Fire Emblem Heroes	Edward		
2020	Eternal Return	Arda, Plague Dr. Daniel		
2020	Genshin Impact	Fujing, Aarav		
2020	Blush Blush	Scale		
2021	Smash Legends	Victor		
2023	Honkai: Star Rail	Phainon		
2023	Astral Ascent	Gemini		
2024	Unicorn Overlord	Gilbert		
2026	Fire Emblem: Fortune's Weave	Eshmel (male)		
