= March 7th (Honkai: Star Rail) =

Video game mascot

- Honkai character
- Official artwork
- First game: Honkai: Star Rail (2023) (Note: Evernight was released as a playable character in 2025. However, she made her first appearance in 2023 bearing a striking resemblance to March 7th. She was initially referred to as "March 7th (?)".)
- Voiced by: EN: Skyler Davenport; ZH: Nuoya; JA: Yui Ogura; KO: Jung Hye-won

In-universe information
- Species: Human (March 7th); Memetic entity (Evernight)
- Types: Ice (March 7th and Evernight); Imaginary (March 7th)
- Paths: Preservation, The Hunt (March 7th); Remembrance (Evernight), Trailblaze (lore)

March 7th (Chinese: 三月七; pinyin: Sān Yuè Qī) is a character in the video game Honkai: Star Rail, developed by miHoYo. In the game, she is one of the members of the fictional organization known as the Astral Express crew, and frequently accompanies the protagonist Trailblazer on adventures. She is also the game's mascot and is featured on the game's app icons. She was released in version 1.0 of the game in 2023.

In 2025, an alternate version of her called Evernight (长夜月; Chángyè Yuè; 'Long Night Moon') was released. March 7th has generally received positive reviews due to her cute personality.

== Design and voice acting ==
March 7th is the mascot for Honkai: Star Rail. The game's app icon and official social media account icons both feature a portrait of her winking and smiling. She made her first appearance in miHoYo's first gameplay reveal trailer for the game, which was released on October 8, 2021. miHoYo released a character trailer for her called "Come On, Let's Take a Photo!" on April 21, 2022, which showcased her love for photography. Information about her amnesia was also revealed in the character trailer.

March 7th was released alongside the game itself on April 26, 2023, the seventh day of the third month in the traditional Chinese calendar in 2023. Other than the main protagonist Trailblazer, she is the first character that players can unlock; she automatically joins the player's character roster shortly after the game begins. March 7th is also the first character in the game for whom miHoYo released a second outfit.

In version 3.6 of the game in 2025, Evernight was released as an alternate form of March 7th. Evernight is considered a separate playable character to March 7th, as her personality and combat abilities are both different from those of March 7th. March 7th herself says Evernight is more mysterious and elegant than she is, and Dan Heng remarks that Evernight is less forgetful than March 7th. Evernight is a DPS and support character, whereas March 7th focuses on shielding.

Both March 7th and Evernight share the same voice actresses. They are voiced in Chinese by Nuoya, in English by Skyler Davenport, in Japanese by Yui Ogura, and in Korean by Jung Hye-won.

== Appearances ==
=== Story ===
==== March 7th ====
March 7th is a mysterious amnesiac girl who was sealed inside a block of everlasting ice drifting through space. She was discovered and rescued by the crew of the Astral Express, an interstellar train led by Murata Himeko that travels between planets, eventually becoming one of its passengers. She knows nothing about her past or true identity, so she named herself after the date on which she was rescued. Her main hobby is photography, as she uses them to preserve her memories of her adventures. She believes that preserving her memories through photographs may eventually help her uncover clues about her lost identity. Although she does not remember who she was before being rescued, she never stopped searching for answers.

In the character-focused story quest "Total Recall", March 7th attempts to investigate her origins with the help of Fu Xuan, a diviner who operates the Matrix of Prescience, which is a device capable of reconstructing lost memories, aboard the starship the Xianzhou Luofu. Using it, they encounter a reconstructed simulation, or "memory space", generated from fragments of March 7th's past. However, the recreated world is unstable, and an agent of the Garden of Recollection—a faction devoted to preserving memories and aligned with the cosmic Path of Remembrance—intervenes to stop the process. The Path of Remembrance is a cosmic force in the game's lore associated with memory itself. The Garden of Recollection agent forcibly halts the Matrix's operation, preventing March 7th from recovering her memories. Although the attempt fails, March briefly glimpses an image of herself sealed within the mysterious "Six-Phased Ice" – the mysterious, otherworldly ice in which she was originally found. This glimpse confirms that her amnesia is tied to something far larger than a simple accident.

==== Evernight ====
Official portrait of Evernight

After leaving the dream planet of Penacony, the next stop for the Astral Express was to visit the planet Amphoreus, a world inspired by Ancient Greece. She had initially prepared to go with Dan Heng and the Trailblazer, but had to stay back due to a sudden illness. After some time, the Six-Phased Ice reappears and entraps her in a coma, worsening her medical state. She eventually wakes up and attempts to find her friends on Amphoreus, but is advised against doing so by Cyrene, an ally native to Amphoreus. March 7th enters Amphoreus anyway. As the effects of the Six-Phased Ice worsened, eventually a protective alter ego, Evernight, emerged and seized control of March 7th's body. At first she appears to be one of the Trailblazer's allies; however, her goals are starkly different from those of the Astral Express crew. Evernight wants to use the power of the Path of Remembrance to reshape cause and effect, preserve memories, and push what she thinks is a "necessary" event timeline – even if it means overriding others' agency and memories. She believes the future can be improved by controlling memories and events, even if doing so requires altering or erasing people's memories. At one point, Evernight kidnaps the Trailblazer, triggering a major confrontation. She defends her logic fiercely by stating that illusions, manipulation of memory, and the obliteration of painful but true memories are legitimate sacrifices to ensure a future she deems worth living. Eventually, through the intervention of March 7th's original consciousness, control over March 7th's body is restored to her, and Evernight voluntarily enters a state of slumber. Afterwards, March 7th exhibits an increased desire to protect her friends.

=== Gameplay ===
March 7th has three different playable forms in the game: the Path of Preservation, the Path of The Hunt, and Evernight. Her Preservation form is the version that players get at the start of the game. The Hunt form was implemented in version 2.4 and can be obtained for free by progressing through the story. Evernight was implemented in version 3.6 of the game and, as a limited character, must be obtained via the game's gacha system.

March 7th (Preservation) is a 4-star character on the Path of Preservation. She uses the "Six-Phased Ice" in combat. Her Basic Attack deals Ice damage to a single enemy target. Her Skill removes one debuff from a single ally and provides them a shield based on a percentage of her defense. When that ally's current hit points are above 30% of their maximum, the shield also has a taunting effect. Her ultimate deals Ice damage to all enemies and has a certain chance to freeze them in place. When a shielded ally is attacked, March 7th will also perform a counterattack against the enemy.

March 7th (The Hunt) is a 4-star character on the Path of The Hunt. Her Basic Attack and Enhanced Basic Attack deal Imaginary damage to a single enemy. Her Skill increases a single ally's speed and Break Effect statistics while providing additional buffs. When the ally uses their Skill on attacks, she will gain stacks of Charge; at maximum Charge, she will immediately act and enhance her Basic Attack. Her ultimate deals high damage to enemies.

Evernight is a 5-star character on the Path of Remembrance. She can summon a memosprite named Evey to participate in battle. Her Basic Attack deals a certain percentage of Evernight's hit points as Ice damage to a single enemy. Her Skill consumes 10% of her current hit points to summon Evey and increases allies' damage when they perform a critical hit. Her ultimate also summons Evey and deals an increased amount of Ice damage to all enemies on the field, based on her maximum hit points. It also causes her to enter a state known as "Darkest Riddle", during which enemies take 30% more damage. In this state, both Evernight and Evey are immune to crowd control debuffs.

== Collaborations and promotion ==
After the public launch of Honkai: Star Rail, miHoYo released an AI-generated content tool called the "Meme Resonance Machine" through an in-game web event. By uploading an image, players could transform the person in the photo into the likeness of March 7th. The event sparked widespread participation and discussion across the internet; related topics trended on multiple platforms, and nearly 10 million images were generated within the first week of the event. Some of the most popular characters that were turned into March 7th included Paimon from Genshin Impact, Anya Forger from Spy × Family, and Ai Hoshino from Oshi no Ko.

On April 26, 2023, Honkai: Star Rail announced a collaboration with the navigation app Waze in the US, offering a voice pack for March 7th. That fall, the game launched a collaboration with KFC in mainland China. In Taiwan, the game collaborated with Qijia Chicken starting on October 18, 2023, and in Hong Kong, it began a collaboration with KFC on November 9. Purchasing the themed meal in these regions also included a holographic ticket printed with March 7th and Dan Heng. In May 2024, KFC held an event featuring the two characters in Shanghai. In celebration of the game's first anniversary, promotional artwork was set up at several Seibu Railway stations across Tokyo and Saitama Prefecture in Japan starting from April 8 to May 10, 2024. The interior of the trains was decorated with artwork featuring various characters from the game, with March 7th occupying a prominent spot. Additionally, players could tweet the official Honkai: Star Rail Japanese Twitter account with certain hashtags related to the character in order for a chance to win prizes.

== Reception ==
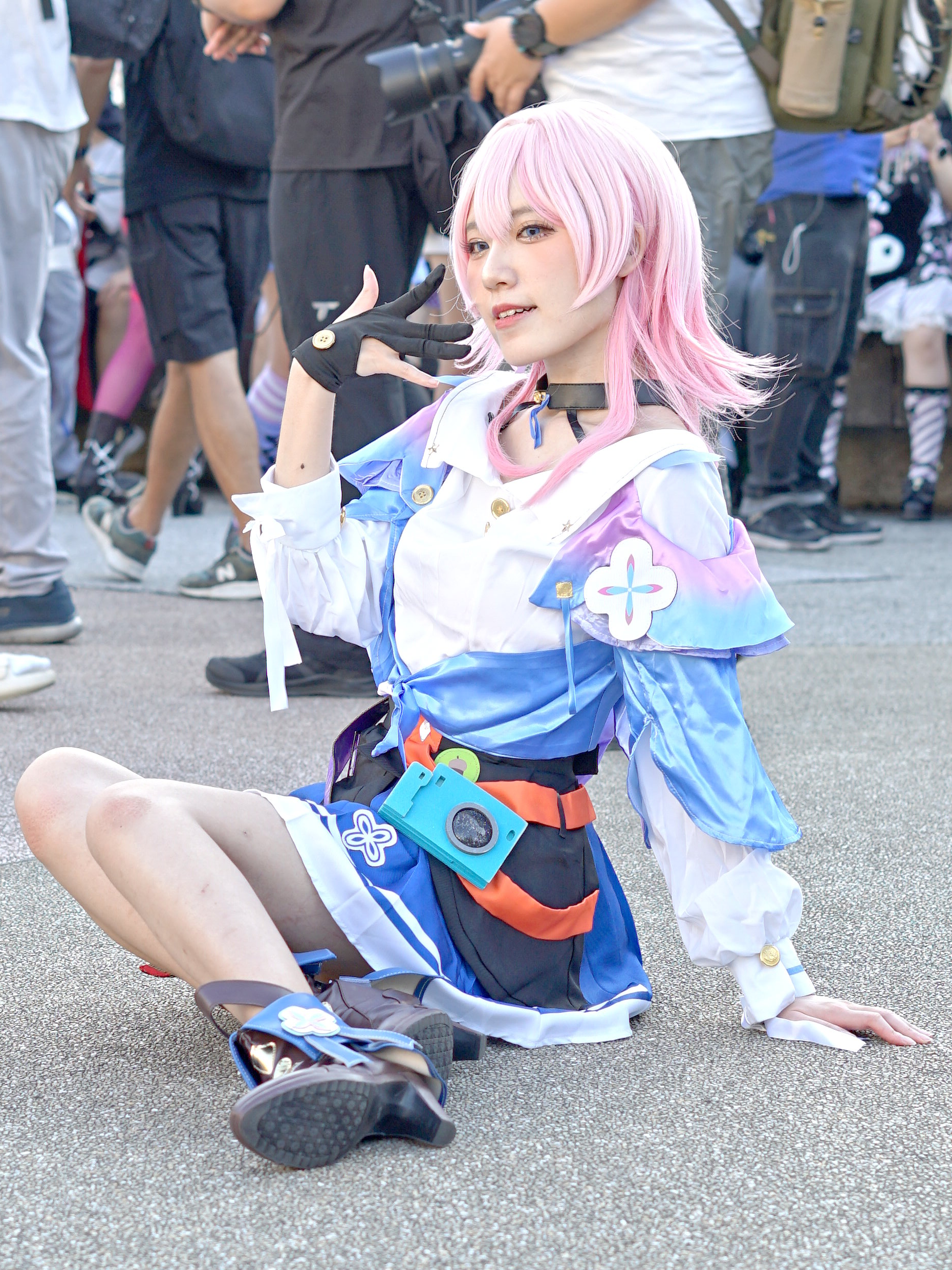
A cosplayer dressed as March 7th

Since the game's public release, March 7th has been widely loved by players. Many fans have expressed their affection for her through cosplay; according to HK01, at one festival in Hong Kong in 2023, there were more than a dozen people cosplaying as her at once.

March 7th's personality and dialogue were received well by critics and players. Editor Dong Hangye wrote for Chuapp that she seemed "poised to become a signature character" for the game and that she gave off a sense of familiarity. One anonymous editor for Chinese gaming site Game Corner likened her to the "cutest [thing] in the universe" when reporting about the AI-generated content event surrounding her. Seth Parmer of TheGamer praised March 7th's personality as intoxicating and her dialogue as humorous, saying that they make her especially endearing to players. Giovanna De Ita of The Nerd Stash similarly commended her, writing that since the game's launch, her lively personality and adorably naive charm have won over many fans. Regarding March 7th's cell phone design, (Note: Every character in Honkai: Star Rail has their own cell phone with a unique case that symbolizes that character. Players can see the cell phone of the character they are currently using by simply pausing the game.) Parmer remarked that March 7th has one of the best-designed phone cases in the game. He highlighted its light-blue and pink tones accented with yellow, calling it stylish and perfectly reflective of her bright and energetic personality, showcasing what seems to be her boundless vitality. Game Me, an editor writing for AUTOMATON, said that they "fell in love" with March 7th, calling her bright, noisy, cute and innocent. He quipped that even though at the time of writing he had only finished one part of the game's story, he could write five entire articles on the things he liked about her. Similar to other critics, Game Me also called her cute, and he even extended this to her combat animations. He went even further to say that she is a character that can be relied on for both funny and tsukkomi parts of the story, the latter term referring to an aspect of Japanese comedy; Game Me highlighted the use of March 7th for comic relief. Rebecca Jones of VG247 praised how, despite the many hardships faced by March 7th and her friends in the story, she remains cheerful, lively and full of optimism. Jones concluded her article by writing, "March 7th is the best of us, and we don't deserve her."

Regarding her gameplay, commentators from TheGamer, Game Rant and VG247 all believe that March 7th is a good shield-type support character. GameRant commentator Hajrudin Krdzic wrote that her support ability is a good choice for new players. Her skills can create one of the most powerful shields in the game. Krdzic also praised her ability to deal damage to opponents. Before Evernight's release, Yahoo News commentator Yan Ku believes that March 7th should be upgraded from four stars to five and indicated that they were looking forward to March 7th's performance in the future. Screen Rant commentator Bruno Yonezawa said that Evernight was an overall powerful character, but wrote that since she performs best in teams with other Remembrance characters, the team compositions she can be used in are limited. Gaming Age commentator Braden Czerwinski said that Evernight was an indespensable character in a Remembrance team, and described her and Evey as powerful. Czerwinski concurred that Evernight performed well with other Remembrance characters.
