= Herta (Honkai: Star Rail) =

Video game character

- Honkai character
- Official artwork of The Herta
- First game: Honkai: Star Rail (2023)
- Voiced by: EN: PJ Mattson; ZH: Hou Xiaofei; JA: Haruka Yamazaki; KO: Kim Seo-yeong

In-universe information
- Species: Puppet (Herta); Human (The Herta)
- Weapon: Hammer (Herta); Magic (The Herta)
- Home: The Blue
- Type: Ice
- Path: Erudition

Herta (Chinese: 黑塔; pinyin: Hēitǎ) is a character in the video game Honkai: Star Rail, developed by miHoYo. In the game, she is member #83 of the Genius Society and the owner of a space station, which she named after herself. In the story, she initially appears as a puppet remotely controlled by her true self.

In January 2025, her true form was released as a separate playable character named The Herta (大黑塔; Dà Hēitǎ; 'Big Herta'). Critics often discussed her status as a member of the Genius Society, the relationship between her and her puppets, her dialogue and character design. Herta's Japanese battle voice lines have also become a meme on social media platforms.

== Design and voice acting ==
Herta's puppet

Herta first appeared as a remotely controlled puppet in version 1.0 of the game at the beginning of the main storyline. The puppet Herta physically resembles a young girl, while the real Herta's appearance was not revealed until the later versions of the game. Multiple offline puppets can be seen throughout the Herta Space Station, and her outfit also exposes the spherical joints at her shoulders, wrists and knees, allowing players to recognize her as a puppet. When fighting as a playable character, the puppet wields a large hammer disproportionate to her body size. The image of the real Herta was first teased in an official artwork for an event in version 2.6. miHoYo revealed information on the implementation of the real Herta as a playable character; unlike the Herta puppet players had previously encountered, this form is named in English as "The Herta". In the lore, this name originates from Herta disliking a suggestion for "Herta Prime", a name that was given to her by the Intelligentsia Guild, because that title implied a distinction between her and her puppets. On January 7, 2025, miHoYo released a trailer for The Herta called "Stars, Silent as Enigmas"; the trailer begins with the omnipotence paradox, introducing Herta's academic achievements as well as the origins and function of her puppets, and also teases the subsequent storyline in which Herta meets Nous, the Aeon of Erudition. On January 10, an animated short titled "The Herta's Magic Kitchen" was released, themed around Herta's everyday cooking. On January 14, a character trailer called "Geniuses in the Universe" was released; the video shows many Herta puppets with different appearances. "The Herta" was implemented in version 3.0 of the game the next day.

Herta and The Herta are both voiced in English by PJ Mattson, in Chinese by Hou Xiaofei, in Japanese by Haruka Yamazaki, and in Korean by Kim Seo-yeong. In an interview, Yamazaki said that although the intelligent Herta has a strong sense of confidence, she does not come across as unpleasant, because Herta's powerful charisma can make others frankly admit that they do not understand things, which in turn gives rise to admiration and a sense of wanting to follow her. In addition, Herta has a mysterious quality which makes her inner thoughts difficult to see through, a one-of-a-kind presence, and a witch-like aura. Mattson, meanwhile, believed that Herta's most appealing core trait lies in her detached, aloof attitude, which makes Herta both interesting and full of a unique sense of humor. She admitted that her own real personality is completely different from Herta's, but she does appreciate Herta's pragmatic value system where "as long as the result meets the standard, the process does not matter". Yamazaki said of her performance that because players were already familiar with Herta's puppet form, in order to provide the voice of the real Herta she needed to respond to players' imaginations of what Herta would sound like growing up while also avoiding disrupting their existing impressions of her. In her view, as a member of the Genius Society, Herta already has lines in which she regards herself as perfect and calls herself young and beautiful, so Yamazaki made The Herta more confident and forceful, but not to an extent that would make her unpleasant. Mattson revealed that during her audition she had referred to the Chinese voice acting, working to capture the pitch and feeling of the character's Chinese dialogue. She sincerely praised Hou's performance as cute; on that basis, Mattson herself tried to approximate that. Once she entered the recording studio, her goal was to completely satisfy the imaginations of the writers and director; no matter how Herta's setting changed, even if she became as important as an Emanator of Erudition, she focused on faithfully presenting the emotions and tone needed for the story.

== Appearances ==
In her youth, Herta already displayed genius-level intelligence. She solved multiple scientific problems, published a paper on age reversal, and also captured and sealed a Stellaron. A Stellaron is a mysterious object in the game that possesses powerful and destructive magic, and is called the "Cancer of All Worlds" because it can bring disaster to civilizations. She also saved her home planet, named the Blue, nineteen times and paid two visits to Nous, the Aeon of Erudition. In order to preserve the Stellaron and various curios (valuable subjects of research for the space station staff, and some of Herta's most prized possessions), she built a space station and named it after herself.

The opening of the main storyline in Honkai: Star Rail is set against the backdrop of the antagonist Antimatter Legion invading the space station. The Stellaron Hunters, a group of criminals led by Elio, took advantage of the situation and set their sights on the Stellaron preserved in the space station; after stealing it, they placed it inside the body of the Trailblazer, the game's protagonist. After the crisis ended, because the Stellaron was unexpectedly able to exist stably inside the Trailblazer's body, and because of their trait of being able to attract the gaze of Aeons, Herta invited the Trailblazer to join her "Simulated Universe" project, as well as to remain at the space station for her to study. In an optional branch of the game's prologue, if the protagonist decides to remain at the space station rather than join the Astral Express, they initially become Herta's research subject, but she quickly loses interest in them; afterward, under the arrangements of lead researcher Asta, they spend the rest of their life as a researcher.

In one arc of the main storyline, Herta is asked by Himeko, the navigator of the Astral Express, to investigate the mysterious planet known as Amphoreus. After paying a visit to Nous in search of answers without success, Astral Express members Welt Yang and Sunday ask her for help because the Trailblazer and Dan Heng lose contact with them after entering Amphoreus; Herta then aids the Astral Express in investigating Amphoreus. Herta initially tries to enter Amphoreus directly, but is blocked by its administrator, Lygus. She later cooperates with fellow Genius Society member, Screwllum, to force her way into Amphoreus, confirming that the planet is essentially a computer called the "Emperor's Scepter" which simulates the rise and fall of civilizations. Herta subsequently participates in the simulation, engages in combat with Lygus, and assists the Trailblazer's group in finding a way to break the simulation. When the virus program known as "Irontomb" within the simulation breaks out, she connects her consciousness to Nous and takes over Nous's calculations, successfully resisting Irontomb's attack on the cosmos. After the scepter is ultimately destroyed, Herta and Screwllum recover most of Amphoreus' data from it, helping to rebuild its civilization.

=== Gameplay ===
The character was released in two forms: "Herta" (the puppet) and "The Herta" (the real Herta). The former is an Ice-type damage dealer who walks the Path of Erudition. Players can obtain her for free in the game's early stages. Her main mechanic is follow-up attacks, which are automatically launched after when their ally teammates damages half of the enemies' maximum health (which can be consecutively stacked) on their turn. Players can also obtain Herta by playing the game's "Simulated Universe" mode. The latter was released as a five-star character who walks the same Path and deals the same type of damage as the former, and her combat design centers on special marks that can be accumulated when teammates launch attacks; the more frequently her teammates attack, the higher The Herta's attack damage becomes. When exploring the game's map, her skill can also mark the locations of treasure chests. The permanent game mode "Simulated Universe" was developed by Herta in the game, and players can choose from multiple "Blessings" to strengthen themselves in combat.

== Reception ==
Herta received positive evaluations from players and critics. Fans expressed their love for the character through means such as cosplay. Regarding Herta's character design, Game Rant commentator Aditi Jeyanathan stated that Herta appears from the beginning of the story as the behind-the-scenes leader of the Herta Space Station, and is also a member of the Genius Society. They wrote that what makes her special is that she does not act through her real body, but instead appears through several puppets made in the likeness of her childhood appearance; at the same time, she is an Emanator of Erudition, with power derived from Nous, the Aeon of Erudition. Herta is also deeply researching the Path of Erudition, trying to understand what "divinity" truly is; this also echoes the trait of geniuses valuing the asking of questions more than answers. TheGamer reviewer Sacha Boast, meanwhile, believed that the game mainly introduces cosmic-level power through Herta; as an Emanator of Erudition who studies the universe's deep secrets, Herta possesses great power and intellect, and is one of the cosmic-level powerhouses in the game's universe.

Denfaminico Gamer reviewer Jisuromakku believed that Herta's appeal comes from the contrast between her young-girl-like appearance and her puppet body. Herta's clothing exposes the spherical joints at her shoulders, wrists and knees, letting players recognize her identity as a puppet at a glance; this visual guidance makes Herta not merely a cute-looking girl, but a character with both mechanical qualities and a puppet-like feel. Herta also uses a large hammer disproportionate to her body in combat, and this exaggerated weapon adds intuitive appeal to her design. AUTOMATON editor-in-chief Ayuo Kawase stated that as the owner of the Herta Space Station and a genius scientist, Herta gives players the impression of someone who lacks empathy and whose words and actions are unconventional. Kawase believed that Herta's puppet appearance is cute, but that her words and actions are unpredictable. This contrast gives the voice lines for her follow-up attacks a distinctive memorability, and became the basis for fan creations and memeification. FandomWire reviewer Laveena Joshi praised Herta for her beautiful appearance and strong presence in the trailer "Geniuses in the Universe"; she said that the trailer shows many different appearances of Herta, and that some scenes in the video reminded players of the Junji Ito manga Tomie, the Edvard Munch painting The Scream, scenes similar to the Danganronpa series, and an eyepatch design close to that of Kurumi Tokisaki from Date A Live. She thought that these pop-culture references made the trailer appeal not only to Honkai: Star Rail players but also sparked discussion among fans of Junji Ito and anime viewers.

Regarding Herta's portrayal in the story, Game Rant reviewer Jackie Arias believed that Herta had appeared since the game's opening, but for a long time mostly appeared in the space station, "Simulated Universe" and related side-story content in puppet form; after the Amphoreus arc began, Honkai: Star Rail started devoting more writing to the Genius Society and Herta herself, rather than treating her as solely a background figure. DBLTAP reviewer Marco Wutz also mentioned that version 3.3 of the game places part of Herta's story in collectibles on the Herta Space Station, while these contents, which are quite helpful in completing the setting, could have been placed in the dialogue of the main story. Siliconera editor Jenni Lada, meanwhile, mentioned that such trailers usually place more emphasis on a character's personality and background rather than their moves and uses in the game; she therefore viewed "Stars, Silent as Enigmas" as a trailer which introduced Herta's personality and background.

In Japanese, Herta's follow-up attack voice lines, kurukuru~ (くるくる～) and kururin~ (くるりん～) repeatedly use Japanese mimetic words describing turning or spinning, with a light and cute tone. Because the voice lines are short, have a distinctive rhythm, and directly correspond to the character's spinning motion, players created a large amount of fan work based on these lines, and the lines consequently became popular in the player community. According to Denfaminico Gamer, this voice line was made into otoMADs and alarm sound effects on platforms like YouTube, becoming an internet meme. This meme later no longer circulated only within the Honkai: Star Rail player community, but also spread to groups outside player circles, such as Japanese high school girls. According to AUTOMATON, the related trend originated from a post by a TikTok creator. That post used an audio source composed of the ending theme of Super Mario World, Herta's line "Ever see a diamond this big? It's all yours~" (Note: In Japanese, the line translates to Konna ookina diamondo mita koto nai desho? Ageru ne~ (こんな大きなダイアモンド見たことないでしょ？あげるね～).) and the spinning segment, and paired it with footage of a girl in Splatoon 3 with a weapon; this footage went viral on TikTok and was used in over 15,000 videos. Some videos still retained the theme of Herta spinning, while others mainly used the audio as background music for videos of pets.
