= Amphoreus =

Fictional location in Honkai: Star Rail

- Honkai location
- Okhema, Amphoreus' holy city and de facto capital
- Created by: miHoYo
- Based on: Ancient Greece and Ancient Rome

In-universe information
- Type: Simulated planet
- Ruled by: Chrysos Heirs; Cerydra (formerly)
- Characters: List
- Path: Remembrance

Amphoreus (Chinese: 翁法罗斯; pinyin: Wēngfǎluósī; lit. 'Omphalos') is a fictional location in the video game Honkai: Star Rail, developed by miHoYo. In the game, Amphoreus is initially presented as a world threatened by corrupted deities which is also trapped in repeated cycles of destruction and rebirth. Introduced into the game in version 3.0 in January 2025, Amphoreus serves as the principal setting of one of the game's story arcs.

Critics generally praised Amphoreus' narrative, influences from Ancient Greece and Ancient Rome, setting and character development, but initial responses to its year-long structure for updates and dense philosophical style of writing were divided.

== Design ==
In Honkai: Star Rail, Amphoreus is described as a mysterious world heavily based on Ancient Greece and Ancient Rome. The planet's name references the amphora, an ancient Greek unit of measurement, and its worldbuilding draws upon classical elements such as Roman bathhouses, also called "thermae". To some, Amphoreus represented a departure from previous worlds, most of which resembled science fiction worlds; Amphoreus gave the impression of pure fantasy instead. Gameplay and design features in Amphoreus center around intricate manipulation of space and time. This allows players to shift objects in the environment using special abilities or travel between two distinct map timelines through the power of memory-based magic. The concept of Memosprites, a type of familiar or summon belonging to characters who follow the Path of Remembrance, were added to the game as a combat mechanic.

== Lore ==
Amphoreus was originally believed to have been shaped by twelve Titans, powerful deities who were divided among those governing fate, the physical world, life, and calamity. Amphoreus initially flourished as a society until one day, when a mysterious phenomenon called the Black Tide drove the Titans mad and plunged Amphoreus into a war. A prophecy foretold the rise of the Chrysos Heirs, a group of heroes who would defeat the corrupted Titans, claim their Coreflames which gave them their powers, and bring about a new beginning to Amphoreus. However, Amphoreus was actually a simulated world running within a scepter named δ-me13 as part of an experiment intended to produce Irontomb, a very dangerous Lord Ravager of Destruction. Before the game's events, Phainon and Cyrene uncovered this truth and devised the 'Eternal Recurrence': Cyrene established a closed time loop, while Phainon repeatedly gathered the Coreflames to prevent Irontomb's birth. In each cycle, Phainon gathered Coreflames while Cyrene repeatedly uploaded Amphoreus' accumulated memories before the world was reset. Those memories eventually filled the empty core of Demiurge, Amphoreus' core consciousness, which later inherited Cyrene's identity.

After the Astral Express, a train used for interstellar travel, runs low on fuel, a woman named Black Swan proposes traveling to Amphoreus to pick up fuel. The game's protagonist, the Trailblazer and their friend Dan Heng are attacked while arriving on Amphoreus, and eventually meet Phainon and fellow Chrysos Heir Tribbie. They then reach Okhema, the planet's de facto capital, where they become involved in the Chrysos Heirs' campaign against the Titans and the prophesied end of the world. During the current recurrence, the Phainon accompanying the Trailblazer eventually learns the truth behind Amphoreus and confronts the Flame Reaver, who is revealed to be Khaslana, the original Phainon who had carried the Flame-Chase across the preceding cycles. After defeating him, Phainon inherits his accumulated memories and Coreflames. By the current cycle, the world has already been reset over thirty-three million times, with successive versions of Phainon inheriting the memories and burden of those before him.

It is revealed that the Trailblazer's arrival is the variable needed to break the cycle. Phainon entrusts Amphoreus' fate to the Trailblazer and sacrifices himself, allowing one final recurrence to begin in which the Trailblazer takes his place. He then uses the power accumulated over countless lifetimes to confront the antagonistic forces of Destruction. Although Phainon is defeated and absorbed by Irontomb, he destroys his own data before his assimilation, removing himself from subsequent recurrences; from within Irontomb, his resistance suppresses the Black Tide and slows its completion. In the final battle against Irontomb, the Trailblazer and Cyrene destroy Irontomb. Cyrene then travels back in time, setting into motion the prophecies and other events that shaped Amphoreus' history; as she loses her memories and power, she completes Amphoreus' causal loop. The Scepter is ultimately shattered and the simulated Amphoreus collapses into stardust, but the memories of Amphoreus and its inhabitants are preserved in a book called "As I've Written." Outside Amphoreus, a genius named Herta later states that Amphoreus and its inhabitants are being reborn as real entities in the universe instead of as the electrical signals they were, although it is unclear when that process will be completed.

== Promotion and release ==
Amphoreus was released in version 3.0 of the game, which was released on January 15, 2025. miHoYo released a promotional video about Amphoreus, called "The Allegory of the Cave", which hinted at its story on January 18. Every new update during the Amphoreus story arc introduced new areas of the map for players to explore. The Amphoreus story arc concluded with version 3.7, which was released on November 5, 2025.

miHoYo also announced several promotional efforts for Amphoreus in April 2025, including with companies such as the Japanese convenience store chain Lawson, and several television commercials. The Lawson campaign used several Amphoreus characters including Castorice, whose Japanese voice actress made in-character announcements in stores. The Chinese coffee brand Luckin Coffee released merchandise including gift bags and drinkware with Castorice and Phainon on them in autumn 2025. Both characters received modern outfits in the promotional art for the collaboration. Holly Alice of Pocket Tactics doubted the collaboration would be made available outside of China, and hoped that miHoYo would release the designs as skins in the game. In November of the same year, the music video for Japanese voice actor Mamoru Miyano's song "Zero Light" was released, with Phainon and the other Chrysos Heirs as the theme. In the visual feed, Phainon can be seen facing a threat, while Tribbie and the other Chrysos Heirs stand behind him in support.

== Reception and impact ==
Amphoreus was generally well received by players and critics. It inspired an unusually large amount of fan creations, which culminated in an organized event called "Farewell, Amphoreus" in Chengdu, China, which grew from a month-long collaborative art relay into a convention featuring fan-made exhibits. One writer for Game Grape indicated that topics on Douyin accumulated hundreds of millions of views, which they presented as evidence of the Amphoreus story's strong influence on the Honkai: Star Rail fan community. They described it as a "feat unprecedented in the entire history of gacha games." A writer for Jinghe praised the Amphoreus story arc in general, calling it a well-fought but crucial battle on the part of miHoYo.

The story of the Amphoreus arc initially drew attention for its scale and departures from the game's previous settings. Writing for 4gamer, Rune described it as large in scale for Honkai: Star Rail, while also arguing that Amphoreus' ancient Greek- and Roman-inspired setting differentiated it from the previously released level, Penacony, by a significant amount. SIGH of Real Sound similarly saw that, despite the setting's initially familiar fantasy elements, the opening portions of the Amphoreus moved at a fast pace. They praised the mysteriousness of the world, writing that it gave players substantial material about which to speculate between updates. Critics developed extensive theories about Amphoreus' nature before and shortly after its release; Abu Yamazaki of Famitsu speculated about the identities of the Aeons influencing Amphoreus and about the relationship between the Chrysos Heirs and Titans. SIGH compared the EP "The Allegory of the Cave" to one of the allegories used by Plato, suggesting that the Trailblazer may cause Amphoreus' inhabitants to discover that the reality they lived in was false. Game Rant writer Jackie Arias praised the developers' decision to take inspiration from lesser-known characters in Greek mythology in terms of character creation. She also connected the Chrysos Heirs the Flame-Chasers from Honkai Impact 3rd, a group of genetically modified soldiers fighting to save their world from an infection. The decision to tell the Amphoreus story continuously across eight updates rather than take breaks initially received some skepticism. Chinese outlet Jinghe reported that certain players considered version 3.0 comparatively uneventful and questioned why miHoYo was devoting so much of the game's production capacity to Amphoreus. However, by version 3.4, the outlet argued that these doubts had largely been addressed as players increasingly anticipated each update, which Jinghe compared to episodes of a television series.

Retrospective assessments after the story's conclusion were more divided. In an article for ENCOUNT, SIGH observed that reactions tended to fall between players who appreciated the substantial year-long narrative and those who thought it was overly protracted. They said that the frequent philosophical voice lines could make the story difficult to follow. Nevertheless, they praised the story's fusion of mythology and science fiction and argued that its central strength was in allowing emotion and action to define the outcome, rather than the setting. The recurring struggles of Phainon and Cyrene were interpreted as expressing the idea that repetition which appears to be futile at first can eventually produce change. Jinghe likewise described the story's structure as a risky experiment on miHoYo's part and considered version 3.7 a comparatively safe conclusion, but praised the change in characterization of the Chrysos Heirs at the end, writing that they appeared somewhat more mature. They wrote that the ending was more open than what some players had been expecting, but concluded that the game had successfully handled the conclusion of an important story arc.

Amphoreus' gameplay was generally received well, but it was initially criticized. According to miHoYo CEO Liu Wei, Amphoreus "contained a lot of redundancy and needed reflection and optimization" in regards to the large amount of puzzles it contained. miHoYo had first focused on creating puzzles, but after player backlash due to the puzzles' density, they reduced puzzle content in future updates and shifted more on the presentation of the story. Megan Lorich of Game Rant praised the time-bending mechanic, however, viewing it as a reference to "thermae". She argued that using Greek and Roman words for Amphoreus' terminology showed miHoYo's dedication to the theme. Jinghe praised the finale battle against the Irontomb boss, writing that the enemy's abilities and big body increased the spectacle of the battle. However, they also mentioned that there were other problems with combat design in Amphoreus.

Amphoreus' external appearance, above, resembles a Möbius strip.

Amphoreus' setting and cultural aesthetic received praise for their identity and use of classical influences. Critics argued that its world and characters drew heavily from Greek mythology, while 4gamer praised the degree of craftsmanship throughout the setting. SIGH interpreted Amphoreus' visual form as resembling a Möbius strip, associating its circular shape with the recurring cycles underlying Amphoreus. The region's terminology and characters also attracted attention and praise. Yamazaki highlighted how the Chrysos Heirs were distinguished through individual epithets, Coreflames, city-states from which they came, and divine powers; he singled out Aglaea's possession of a Coreflame as an intriguing clue to the relationship between Coreflames and Titans. Real Sound similarly anticipated that the Chrysos Heirs would remain closely associated with Amphoreus rather than becoming broadly-recurring characters elsewhere in the game. Later, Jinghe argued that from version 3.2 on, miHoYo had obviously increased its investment in characters important to Amphoreus such as Castorice and Phainon.
