= Trailblazer (Honkai: Star Rail) =

Video game protagonist

- Honkai character
- Official artwork of Caelus (left) and Stelle (right)
- First game: Honkai: Star Rail (2023)
- Voiced by: English: Male: Caleb Yen (2023–2025); Shaun Mendum (2025–present); Female: Rachel Chau (2023–2025); Chloe Eves (2025–present); Chinese: Male: Qin Qiege; Female: Chen Tingting; Japanese: Male: Junya Enoki; Female: Yui Ishikawa; Korean: Male: Kim Myung-jun; Female: Kim Ha-ru

In-universe information
- Full name: Caelus (male) or Stelle (female)
- Species: Artificial body
- Weapon: Baseball bat (primary)
- Home: Astral Express
- Types: Physical, Fire, Imaginary, Ice, Lightning
- Paths: List: Destruction, Preservation, Harmony, Remembrance, Elation (combat); Trailblaze (lore)

The Trailblazer, (Note: Chinese: 开拓者; pinyin: Kāituòzhě; lit. 'pioneer') alternatively known by their canonical names Caelus (Note: 穹; Qióng; 'vault' (male Trailblazer)) or Stelle, (Note: 星; Xīng; 'star' (female Trailblazer)) is the main protagonist of the video game Honkai: Star Rail, developed by miHoYo. In the game, the Trailblazer is part of an interstellar group known as the Astral Express, who travel to the various worlds in the universe in an effort to connect them. Along the way, they solve the problems faced by each of those worlds and befriend the people thereof.

The Trailblazer was one of the first characters to be released in the game, having been in the game since launch in late April 2023. With each new world, the Trailblazer unlocks a new Path, or role in combat. The Trailblazer's gameplay was widely compared to that of one of miHoYo's other main characters, the Traveler from Genshin Impact, and their personality was seen as eccentric but charming. Critics took notice of their appreciation for trash cans.

== Design and release ==
The Trailblazer appeared alongside several other characters in the game's closed beta trailer released in April 2022. The Trailblazer also appeared in another closed beta trailer released in January 2023. In the trailer, the female Trailblazer, Stelle, was seen with fellow Nameless, March 7th and Dan Heng, walking around the planet of Jarilo-VI, but not much else was revealed about them. They are described as a "special traveler". Players can also select a male Trailblazer named Caelus instead of Stelle. They are also free to input the name that the Trailblazer will use in most of the game. Once a gender is chosen for a Trailblazer, the player is unable to change their decision. The developers stated that they wanted the Trailblazer to be more than a simple voiceless character who leads the plot. They instead wanted to "breathe life" into the Trailblazer. They felt that a sense of humor naturally emanates from the Trailblazer, and expressed hope that players' images of them would be influenced by their own choices. Their personality is heavily influenced by the player and their choices. Honkai: Star Rail's combat system consists of different Paths a character can take, which dictate the role they play in a party; a different version of the Trailblazer is released for each Path, and they operate differently from one another. The first edition of the Trailblazer was released on April 26, 2023, alongside the game itself.

Caelus is voiced in Chinese by Qin Qiege, in Japanese by Junya Enoki, and in Korean by Kim Myung-jun. Stelle is voiced in those languages by Chen Tingting, Yui Ishikawa, and Kim Ha-ru, respectively. In English, they were originally voiced by Caleb Yen and Rachael Chau; however, they were replaced by Shaun Mendum and Chloe Eves, respectively, in 2025. In an interview in 2026, Chau stated that she believed the Trailblazer to be "a little dumb" but capable in a fight.

== Appearances ==
Before the events of the game, the Trailblazer was a member of a group of criminals called the Stellaron Hunters, with the goal of neutralizing the danger posed by Stellarons, very powerful objects which are known as the Cancer of All Worlds. Not much else is known about their lives before the game takes place, other than that they had been raised by Kafka during their infancy. In the game's first mission, the Trailblazer and the receptacle where they were kept were teleported inside a space station owned by Herta, a researcher and genius. The space station is infiltrated by members of the antagonistic Antimatter Legion, and several Stellaron Hunters also arrive including Kafka, taking advantage of the chaos. Kafka releases the Trailblazer from their receptacle, puts a Stellaron inside their body, and subsequently wipes their memories. She then escapes. The Trailblazer wakes up and befriends March 7th and Dan Heng, who help them escape the space station and board the Astral Express, a spacefaring train which travels between planets. The Trailblazer meets other members of the train's crew, including Welt Yang and the crew's navigator, Himeko.

The group's first major stop is Jarilo-VI, a planet frozen by a Stellaron. The Trailblazer and their allies defeat a corrupt political leader there, Cocolia, using the power of the Preservation, and subsequently transfer the planet's leadership over to her daughter who promises reform. The group next travels to the Xianzhou Luofu, a starship, which they save from being threatened by the Antimatter Legion and gain the recognition of the Aeon of The Hunt. After this, the Xianzhou forms an alliance with the Astral Express. In Penacony, the crew enters a vast shared dream called the Dreamscape, and what begins as a sort of glamorous festival spirals into conspiracy when people are seemingly killed by a mysterious entity. The still-amnesiac Trailblazer meets Firefly, who reveals herself to be a Stellaron Hunter and who hints that they have a past together, but cannot go into detail about it. The Trailblazer restores reality with help from allies, in part due to the power of the Harmony.

After Penacony is Amphoreus, a hidden world which is eventually revealed to be a simulated universe created by a sentient supercomputer. The Trailblazer joins a campaign to break the loop with the power of the Remembrance, and they learn that the planet incubates a Lord Ravager of the Antimatter Legion to attack the Aeon of Erudition. The Trailblazer gains the assistance of the Xianzhou Alliance, the Interastral Peace Corporation (IPC) and Herta's forces to defeat the Lord Ravager. Cyrene, a divine intelligence tied to the world's origin, sacrifices herself to stabilize the timeline and entrusts the Trailblazer with the memories of Amphoreus. After Amphoreus, the Astral Express heads to a planet called Planarcadia, and the Trailblazer participates in the Phantasmoon Games, a spectacle where contestants compete to become the Aeon of Elation.

=== Gameplay ===
As of 2026, five different versions of the Trailblazer have been released, each one corresponding to a different world, Path, (Note: In Honkai: Star Rail's lore, Paths are manifestations of universal philosophical concepts. A person is considered to be "on" a Path when their will overlaps with the characteristics of that Path. For example, characters on the Path of Remembrance often have something to do with memory. Only certain Paths are available for use in combat; characters who use other Paths in the lore are assigned alternative Paths that they use in combat instead. In combat, a Path defines a character's combat role and design philosophy.) and function in combat. In the lore, they are known for using a baseball bat as their primary weapon. The Destruction Trailblazer is the first version of the Trailblazer to be unlocked, and generally has an attacking role in combat. Their Basic Attack and Skill both deal Physical damage to one or three enemies respectively, and their ultimate deals more Physical damage to enemies. The Preservation version of the Trailblazer deals Fire damage, and their Basic Attack shields the party while also attacking the enemy. Their Skill creates another shield for the party, and their ultimate also triggers a team-wide shield and deals Fire damage to all enemies. When aligned with the Path of Harmony, the Trailblazer's Skill deals Imaginary damage, and their ultimate increases allies' Break Effect. Break Effect is a stat which affects enemy weaknesses. The Remembrance Trailblazer's Skill summons a creature called Mem and advances the turn of a designated ally. Their ultimate enables Mem to deal Ice damage to all enemies. The Trailblazer on the Path of Elation can use a glow stick as a weapon. When using their skill, it transforms into a lightsaber, dealing damage to all enemies and granting 'Certified Banger.' The glow stick can also turn into nunchucks, unleashing a series of rapid attacks against surrounding enemies, dealing multiple instances of damage. When using their ultimate, the Trailblazer can cheer for an ally, granting that ally 'Certified Banger' while also causing them to immediately unleash their Elation skill.

== Reception ==
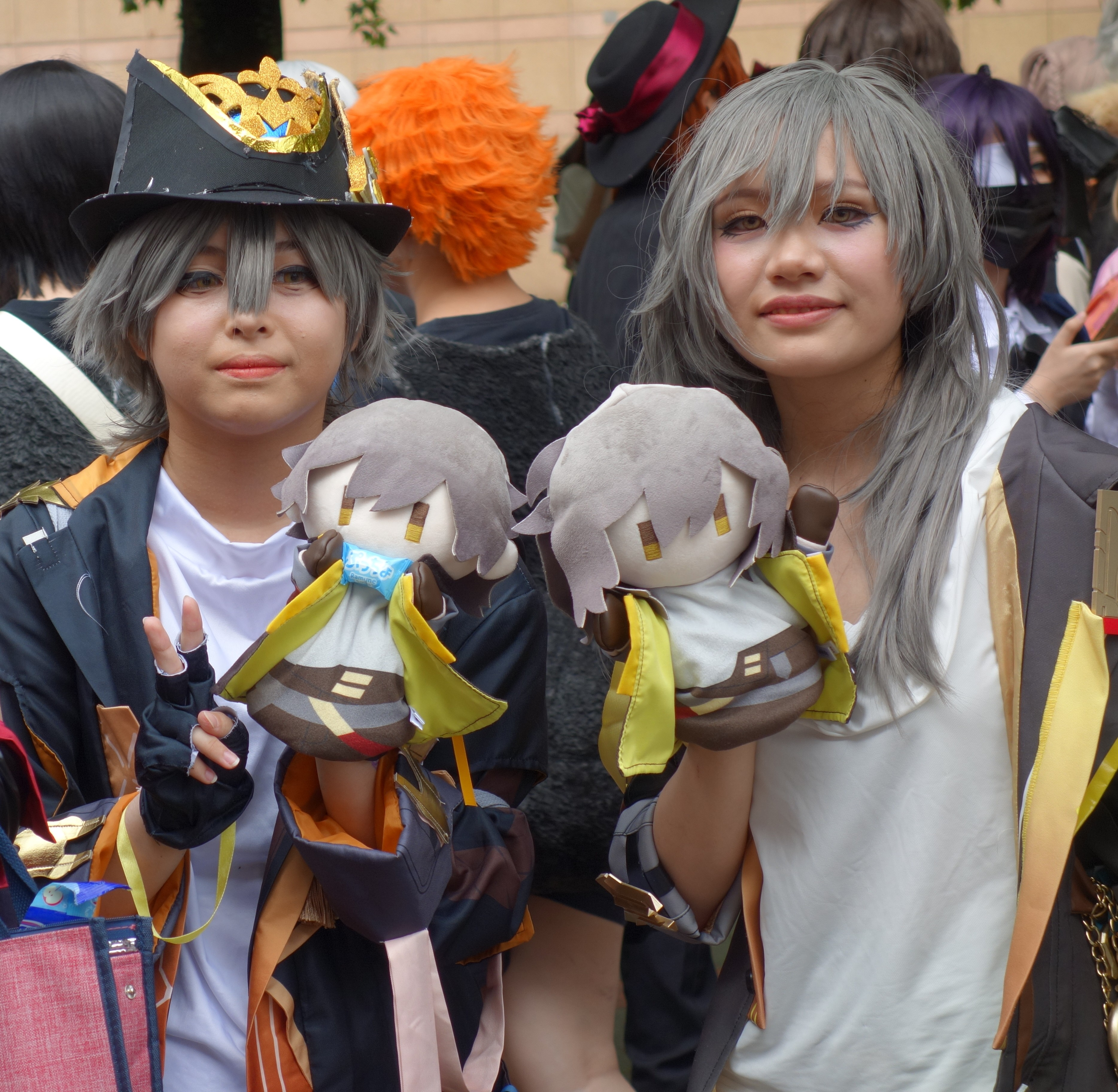
Cosplayers of Caelus (left) and Stelle (right)

The Trailblazer has been received well by critics. One of the other characters they are most frequently compared to is the Traveler, the main protagonist from one of miHoYo's other games, Genshin Impact, and they are considered the Honkai: Star Rail equivalent to them. GamesRadar+ commentator Austin Wood praised the Trailblazer and called them "head and shoulders above" the Traveler and saying that it was nice to have a protagonist that talked for themselves instead of having another character, such as Genshin Impact's Paimon, do the talking for them. Ben Brosofsky of Screen Rant said that the Trailblazer's gameplay is generally stronger than that of the Traveler and that they were more viable in combat. Destructoid writer Eric Van Allen said that the Trailblazer had more life to them than the Traveler because they exist as a character that actually interacts with others, and not as a "window for the player to peer through." In the past, miHoYo's main protagonists were generally kind people according to Siliconera editor Jenni Lada; Kiana Kaslana of Honkai Impact 3rd was seen as kind and dedicated, and the Traveler was willing to go out of their way to help others in need. Lada argues that comparatively speaking, the Trailblazer is more sarcastic and pessimistic, which she argued was refreshing to see. Van Allen also compared the Trailblazer's status as the main character to other games, writing that once a player picks either the male or female Trailblazer, that character becomes not only the player, but the main character in the game, and he compared this to other games where the main character may be unseen such as in Fire Emblem Heroes. He argued that this distinction was important because it allowed the Trailblazer to take on a life of their own.

=== Characterization ===
The Trailblazer's characterization has also been generally praised. Writer Kotomegu of Dengeki Online wrote that in most other role-playing games the main character is either silent or strong-willed. By comparison, she called the Trailblazer's behavior eccentric, and wrote that some of the dialogue choices the player can make were funny to her. Wood cited one Reddit user as saying that watching them being sassy and silly made the various interactions between characters more enjoyable for them. Lada wrote that there was a freedom given to players in that they could have their Trailblazers be lazy or greedy, comparing them to an "exasperated 30 year old". At the same time, she said it was nice to see them interact well with children such as Hook, which she said exemplifies the Trailblazer's silliness even though they are, at the same time, lazy and snarky. Lada pointed to the game's text-messaging system as an opportunity to see this aspect of them on full display, and compared their personality to that of a gremlin or goblin. Van Allen also said the Trailblazer had "a lot of life to them", citing the texting system as well as dialogue and side quests. Van Allen characterized the Trailblazer as "an absolute mess", adding that they can choose to express sarcasm towards certain characters or even flirt with them. He praised the familiar way in which they interacted with fellow members of the Astral Express as heartwarming. He said there was a chaotic aura to the Trailblazer that resonated with him, and that Caelus specifically did not come off as smart, but that still "he does shine"; he argued that the Trailblazer forms an anchor for the whole crew, though did not specify if by "crew" he meant the Astral Express crew or the current party. Writer Kataoka, also of Dengeki Online, complimented the Trailblazer's sense of humor, saying that it exceeded expectations and that their bizarre behavior was a part of their charm. A writer for 4Gamer wrote that Stelle had a deadpan look and goofy aura, which they said gave her character.

Particularly of interest to critics was the Trailblazer's fascination with trash cans. The reasoning behind why the Trailblazer likes them so much is not explained in game, but nevertheless Lada mentions that the Trailblazer is seen investigating every trash can they find, to the point where they even receive an optional trash can avatar icon, which she jokingly implied was "to show they are a trash person". She also mentions that Dan Heng and March 7th have accepted this fact about the Trailblazer, writing that this is treated as a sort of running gag or personality trait. Seeing the Trailblazer rummaging through the trash surprised Kotomegu when she first saw it. While the trash cans themselves were Polygon writer Ana Diaz's favorite thing about Belobog (the city on Jarilo-VI where the Trailblaze Mission there takes place), she did say that the Trailblazer's obsession with them was "a bit ridiculous", and that the Trailblazer's obsession with trash cans was their favorite example of this. This trait did not go unnoticed by the game's players and fanbase either, as there was fan art of the Trailblazer in and around dumpsters, particularly dumpster diving. PCGamesN's Lauren Bergin said of the trash cans that "these waste disposal units have won the hearts of Trailblazers from across the cosmos".

A study conducted by the University of Tokyo argued that the character design of the Trailblazer fundamentally subverts the traditional binary opposition in RPG protagonists between the "default hero" and the "blank-slate avatar." By systematically embedding "meta-awareness," the Trailblazer is transformed into the player's "epistemological co-conspirator" within the virtual world. Its dialogue system employs a dual-coding mechanism, allowing the player's choices to function simultaneously as in-character speech within the story and as out-of-character commentary from the player. When a player selects a meta-option (a choice in a game that breaks the fourth wall), they signal their familiarity with the medium and their awareness of its formulas while still choosing to participate. This turns what might otherwise feel like cynicism or frustration into a more playful, conspiratorial form of enjoyment. The study interpreted the interaction with trash cans as a profound meta-critique of open-world player behavior. Through a five-stage psychological shift (from compliance, awareness, challenge, and acceptance to absurd reward), the player's compulsive behavior is ritualized into a confirmation of the co-conspiratorial relationship. The Trailblazer's dialogue frequently cites cultural knowledge from "Earth", such as the Turing test and 42, yet the game deliberately offers no in-story explanation. This ambiguity creates a state of "double dwelling"—where the Trailblazer and player share a single voice, making self-awareness a core mechanic. The study concluded that the Trailblazer is the central embodiment of Honkai: Star Rail's "reflexive world-building," transforming the fourth wall from a flaw to be hidden into a seam connecting fiction and real-life experience. The unspoken contract between player and game shifts away from convincing the player that the world is real and toward a shared awareness of the game's constructed nature. This redefines immersion, moving it from belief in the fictional world to the sensation of being recognized by it.

=== Appearance and lore ===
Both Caelus and Stelle received praise for their appearance in general. Lada called them both "delightfully disheveled", theorizing that this could be due to their mysterious past. Their messy hair, sleepy-looking eyes and untucked shirts, she argued, make them appear as if they had just woken up and want people's gratitude for helping them solve their problems. She characterized their outfits as looking great due to an approach she called "organized chaos". Bergin stated that fans also tended to compare them to raccoons due to their unkempt hair and yellow, hooded eyes. The Nerd Stash writers Patrick Armstrong and August praised Caelus's outfit as stylish and consisting of a mix of cyberpunk and science fiction elements, but also wrote that Stelle was more elegant because she wears a skirt and high heels instead of the slacks and sneakers Caelus wears.

The lore behind the Trailblazer was also heavily analyzed and critiqued. Lada believes that their mysterious past identity could be important to the game and that they could even perhaps be the Aeon of the Trailblaze, Akivili, who disappeared before the game's events. She also speculated that the Stellaron Hunters may know more than they let on, and that they may have been trying to resurrect Akivili using the Stellaron placed inside the Trailblazer, saying that a Stellaron could potentially revive a deceased Aeon. After leaving Amphoreus to be recreated in reality in the future, the Trailblazer tells the planet's story to accelerate its rebirth; not long after they leave, there is a cutscene in which a quick shot of both Caelus and Stelle is seen. Lian Po of 3DM said that in Amphoreus, unlike previous quests, the heroic Chrysos Heirs may appear in the plot almost as frequently as the Trailblazer and, if so, they raised the question of what role the Trailblazer would play in the battle between the Chrysos Heirs and Titans. Many people speculated that a line in one of the trailers for Amphoreus foreshadowed that the Trailblazer would become a Chrysos Heir and save Amphoreus from danger.
