= Honkai: Star Rail =

2023 video game

- Developer: miHoYo
- Publisher: miHoYo (China); HoYoverse (Global); 3T Online (Vietnam); Nijigen Games (Taiwan, Hong Kong, Macau)
- Producer: David Jiang
- Composers: HOYO-MiX: Cui Hanpu; Cui Wei; Lin Yifan; Gong Qi; Wang Kexin; Wang Yujue; Wen Chi
- Series: Honkai
- Engine: Unity
- Platforms: Windows; iOS; Android; PlayStation 5
- Release: Windows, iOS, Android; April 26, 2023; PS5; October 11, 2023
- Genre: Role-playing
- Mode: Single-player

Honkai: Star Rail (/ˈhɔːnˌkaɪ/, Chinese: 崩坏: 星穹铁道; pinyin: Bēnghuài: Xīngqióng Tiědào; lit. 'Collapse: Starry Sky Railway') is a 2023 free-to-play turn-based role-playing gacha video game developed and published by miHoYo (with publishing outside mainland China under Cognosphere, d/b/a HoYoverse). It is the fourth installment in the Honkai series and the spiritual successor to Honkai Impact 3rd, featuring alternative versions of characters from earlier titles in the series, as well as gameplay elements from miHoYo's previous game Genshin Impact. The game features the main character, who is referred to as the Trailblazer, traveling across the universe on a train called the Astral Express to help and connect the worlds while involved in resolving various disasters.

The first closed beta test was launched on October 27, 2021. It was publicly released internationally for Windows and mobile devices on April 26, 2023, and for PlayStation 5 on October 11, 2023.

Partially due to the popularity of Genshin Impact, the game was widely anticipated before its launch. It was received generally positively by critics, who praised its story, characters and combat system. However, opinions were mixed on its character progression system and gacha monetization strategy.

== Gameplay ==
A battle in Honkai: Star Rail's turn-based combat system. The player has assembled a party consisting of the characters Gepard, the female Trailblazer, Tribbie and Castorice, as shown in the bottom left corner.

Honkai: Star Rail follows the gameplay style of classic Japanese role-playing games where players build up a lineup of characters and control a team of up to four in turn-based combat. In addition to various stats that affect characters' strength, each character has a combat type that affects the kind of damage dealt to targets, a character class referred to as a Path that defines their combat role, and a set of unique abilities called Traces used in combat. Each character can equip a weapon known as a Light Cone, that has various effects that activate if the Paths of both the character and Light Cone match. Characters can also equip various Relics, similar to Artifacts in Genshin Impact.

A screenshot of out-of-combat gameplay in Honkai: Star Rail, showing the currently-active character in the center of the screen and the party on the right.

Elements of open-world and dungeon exploration are present, with multiple mechanics including the gacha system, carried over (with slight differences) from Genshin Impact. Instead of exploring one large map, players explore smaller, self-contained areas on each world, which contain treasure chests, puzzles, and other interactable elements. Both games have mechanics of gacha games, in which players spend in-game currency that can be earned in-game or purchased with real money through microtransactions to receive new characters and weapons. Additional gameplay features include an auto-battle system, fast-forward options during combat, and cross-save support between platforms.

The game's premium currency, Stellar Jade, is primarily used to purchase Star Rail Passes to obtain characters and Light Cones through a mechanic called "warping", and can be earned through gameplay progression, events, and achievements.

== Story ==
=== Setting and characters ===
The game is set in a science-fantasy universe in which humanity and sapient non-human beings are aligned with specific universal concepts known as Paths. Each Path is associated with an Aeon, godlike higher-dimensional beings that preside over aspects of existence across the universe. Those who follow Paths are known as Pathstriders, which align closely with a respective Path based on their wills, while those who are directly blessed with divine powers by the Aeons are known as Emanators. They are typically enforcers of Aeons' wills often incomparably more powerful than mere mortals.

Each Path espouses an ideal: for example, the Abundance is based on the view that immortality is a blessing and that healing and altruism should be valued as a top priority. The Destruction believes that civilization is cancerous to the universe, and seeks to eradicate all of civilization through the spreading of various disasters, such as the Stellaron, an object known as the Cancer of All Worlds, which brings destruction to any planet it is placed on.

Some Paths were led by Aeons who are now deceased, but continue to exist without the influence of their Aeons. The main character of the game known as the Trailblazer, a mysterious amnesiac possessing a Stellaron, follows the Path of Trailblaze, a Path created by the missing Akivili. Pathstriders of Trailblaze, also known as the "Nameless", seek to "explore, establish, and connect" among different worlds.

Different Paths are portrayed as antagonistic, protagonistic, or neutral. The primary antagonist of the game is Nanook, who controls the Path of Destruction, along with Antimatter Legion led by Lord Ravagers, the Emanators of Destruction. Other Paths, such as the Path of Abundance, are not necessarily seen as antagonistic, but are involved in rivalries with The Hunt and other Paths, who view the immortality granted by the Path of Abundance as a curse.

Aside from the Path of Destruction, the Stellaron Hunters are a somewhat antagonistic antihero group throughout the game, who search for and collect Stellarons across the universe and claim to be able to see the future. The main characters are often in conflict with the Stellaron Hunters, though they more or less end up aiding each other on their journeys.

=== Plot ===
The Herta Space Station is attacked by the Antimatter Legion, followers of the Destruction. During the chaos, the Stellaron Hunters, Kafka and Silver Wolf, steal a powerful object called a Stellaron and implant it into an artificial body. That body awakens as the player character, the Trailblazer, but Kafka wipes their memories before leaving. The amnesiac Trailblazer is rescued by March 7th and Dan Heng, who are passengers of the Astral Express, a train that travels across worlds. The Trailblazer joins them as part of the Nameless.

Their first major stop is Jarilo-VI, a planet frozen by a Stellaron's influence. After being declared fugitives by Cocolia, the crew discovers that she has been corrupted by the Stellaron and intends to sacrifice Jarilo-VI to reshape it. With help from the Aeon Qlipoth, the Trailblazer gains the power of Preservation and defeats her. Leadership over Jarilo-VI passes to Cocolia's daughter Bronya, who promises reform.

The crew next travels to the Xianzhou Luofu, a colossal starship aligned with the Path of The Hunt. Political intrigue, interference by the Stellaron Hunters, and manipulation by the Antimatter Legion lead to a major battle. Dan Heng reveals he is the reincarnation of a disgraced dragon-like being, Dan Feng, and helps defeat the Legion's agent Phantylia. The Luofu forms an alliance with the Astral Express.

At Penacony, the "Planet of Festivities", the crew enters a vast shared dream called the Dreamscape. What begins as a glamorous festival spirals into conspiracy: people are seemingly "killed" by a mysterious entity, and the ruling Family is secretly manipulating a Stellaron to control reality. Sunday, one of Penacony's leaders, is exposed as a follower of the Aeon of Order who seeks to trap everyone in a false utopia. The Trailblazer gains the power of Harmony, and with help from allies, the crew restores reality.

The crew's next stop is Amphoreus, a hidden world revealed to be a looping simulated universe created by a sentient supercomputer. The Trailblazer joins a prophetic campaign to break the cycle with the power of Remembrance, while March 7th becomes entangled first with illness and then with an alternate version of herself, known as "Evernight", possessing her body. They learn that the planet is tasked with incubating a Lord Ravager – an Emanator of Destruction – to attack Nous, the Aeon of Erudition. With the assistance of the Xianzhou Alliance, the Interastral Peace Corporation (IPC), and Herta's forces, the Lord Ravager is ultimately defeated. Cyrene, a divine intelligence tied to the world's origin, sacrifices herself to stabilize the timeline and entrusts the Trailblazer with the memories of Amphoreus.

After Amphoreus, the Astral Express heads to the world of Planarcadia, the home planet of Astral Express navigator Himeko, and participates in the Phantasmoon Games, a spectacle where contestants compete for the Aeon of Elation Aha's power. The planet is eventually revealed to be in a tenuous balance between the hidden remains of Oroboros, the Aeon of Voracity, and the Abundance sealing it away in the World in Canvas. The Lord Ravager Asat Pramad tricks the Trailblazer into granting him access to the World in Canvas and attempts to unleash the Voracity onto the planet. In the ensuing fight, Himeko is nearly killed, but the Trailblazer – encouraged by a future version of themself – makes a wish to the Stellaron inside them to protect the Astral Express crew. The crew defeats Asat Pramad, but not before he awakens the Voracity. With the help of the IPC, the Phantasmoon Games' participants, and Aha's successor Nihilux, the crew defeats the Voracity. Nihilux reveals that the Trailblazer is the successor to the deceased Akivili. She fends off an ambush attack from the future Trailblazer, who also kills the Lord Ravager Luxbane.

== Development ==
...we felt that the turn-based combat system is something we have not done before in the company yet, in all our previous games. It's still a viable genre to base the game on, and we felt that it's something that we would really like to give it a try, and our players are really feeling for it, and that's why we developed something like that.

And for sci-fi, in reality, our developers felt that it's something that provides hope, and it's very inspiring for younger generations to really look forward to. Sci-fi represents something that is classic, and sci-fi plus turn-based RPG is something that we would like to give a try. Yeah, that's how the game came to be.

— Michael Lin, HoYoverse Global Business Development team member

Honkai: Star Rail began development in 2019 with the goal of "exploring new directions for the Honkai series". The production team has about 500 people, most of whom are fans of science fiction works and turn-based role-playing games. This project is miHoYo's first attempt at a turn-based combat mechanism game. The team has stated that this genre is very popular in the game market and can lower the difficulty threshold for players to get started. In previous surveys conducted by HoYoverse, many players expressed that they enjoy this type of game. There were concerns about whether this type of game is too retro, but the production team believes that as long as the quality of the game is enjoyable, it can attract players.

Like other works in the Honkai series, it is in no way "too hard-core science fiction". The setting of Honkai Impact 3rd is Earth, but the plot mentions other planets in this worldview. Therefore, the production team of Honkai: Star Rail decided to develop a cosmological theme around its game's lore and worldbuilding to expand on this concept of "a universe". The setting revolves around taking a train which draws inspiration from the idea of a steam train running through the stars in the novel Night on the Galactic Railroad by Kenji Miyazawa and Leiji Matsumoto's famous manga, Galaxy Express 999. The production sequence of each planet in the game takes around one year to first determine the worldview and theme of the planet, then create the characters and detailed setting information, and then finally write the plot.

The overall artistic vision of each planet is based on elements from real-world cultures and aesthetics:

- Belobog, which was named after eponymous Slavic deity, is the name of the blizzard-stricken town in the first planet, Jarilo-VI, which design was inspired by Russian architecture.
- The design of the space-faring fleet "Xianzhou Luofu" is based on Chinese culture and East Asian fantasy, which has been described as "silkpunk".
- Penacony's design was inspired by a blend of Jazz Age, Roaring Twenties, Classical Hollywood, and Western modernist culture, which re-imagines through luxurious dream-like fantasy, forming twelve dream worlds that provide different forms of entertainment.
- The concept of "Amphoreus" takes inspiration from Greco-Roman mythology with its design and aesthetic for its architecture incorporating artistic styles such as Hellenistic, Renaissance, and Neoclassicism.
- Planarcadia, which is described as an immersive amusement world renowned for its pop culture and entertainment, blends urban fantasy with some elements of metaverse and internet aesthetic where the borderline between vivid imagination and virtual reality co-exists.

The game runs on the Unity game engine and is produced by David Jiang. In terms of combat mechanisms, Jiang said that this game adopts "command-based combat." He said that Honkai Impact 3rd and Genshin Impact were heavy on the role-playing aspect, but they did not include command-based and turn-based combat. In addition, some players reported that Honkai Impact 3rd was too action-oriented and too difficult to operate. Therefore, Honkai: Star Rail pays more attention to strategy than the player's operational skills. The development team cited Persona 5 and Trails Series as the team's inspiration.

Producer David Jiang hopes that Honkai: Star Rail can achieve the immersive feeling of "as if you are in the world of the work", and create a "playable animated series". In order to enhance player immersion, the production team integrated artificial intelligence technology into the behavioral patterns of non-player characters. This approach aimed to make traditionally scripted NPC behavior appear more natural, thereby providing players with a stronger sense of being part of the game world.

=== Localization ===
In an interview by Play magazine, HoYoverse explained the unique challenges encountered in the English localization of Honkai: Star Rail. The localization process involves creatively translating cultural and pop culture references, especially those deeply rooted in Chinese society and language. To make the game accessible to English-speaking players, HoYoverse adapts Chinese idioms, memes, and references. For instance, an in-game achievement paying tribute to a Jay Chou song All the Way North was renamed "Sweet Pom-Pom O'Mine" as a nod to Guns N' Roses. The game also features Classical Chinese elements, which are meticulously translated to maintain their essence.

== Distribution and promotion ==
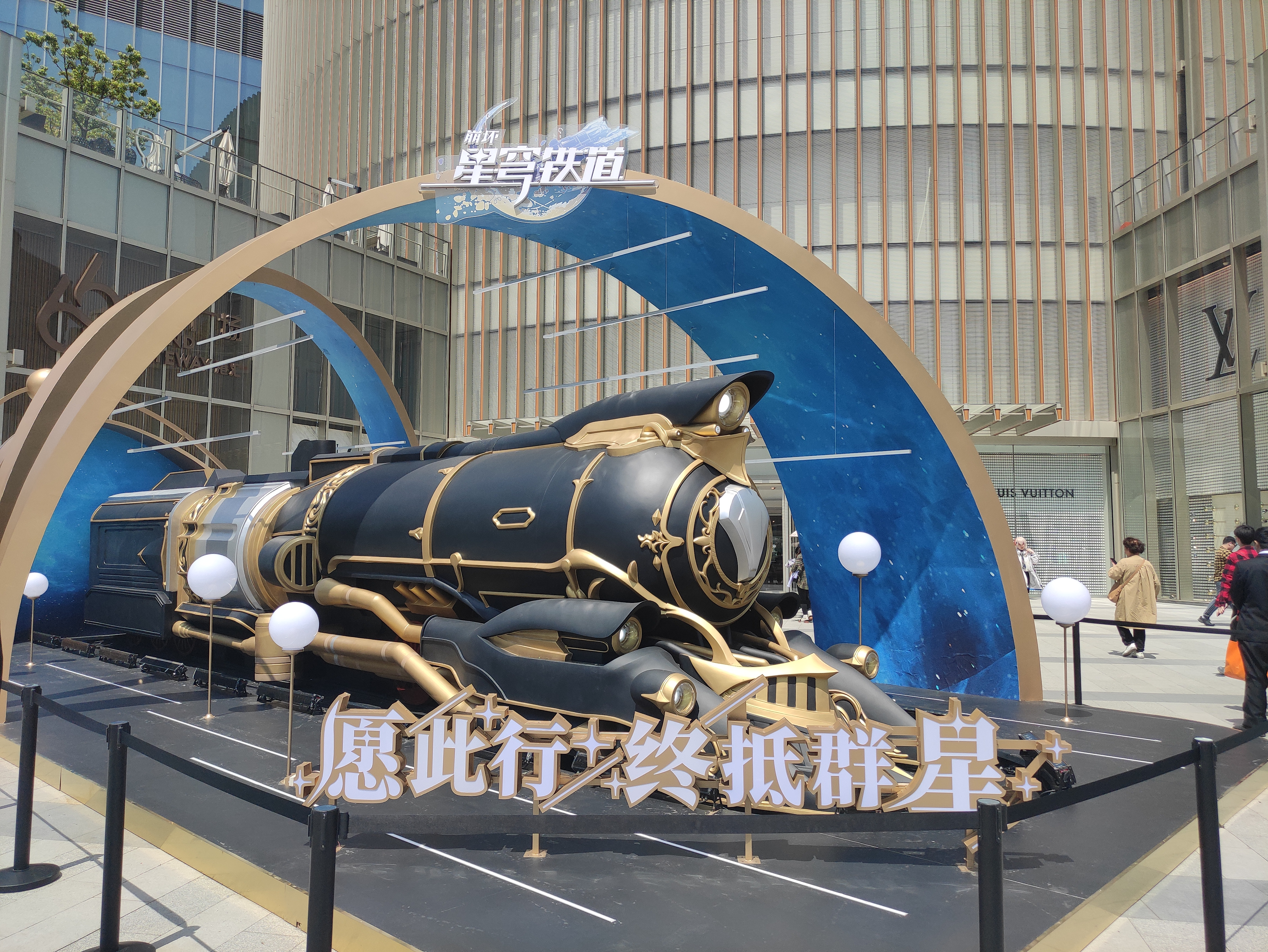
Astral Express model in Xujiahui, Shanghai

The game was revealed in October 2021 at the end of the Honkai Impact 3rd online concert, Starfire Sonorant, then later on the game's official YouTube channel. On October 27, the game launched its first closed test and its second closed beta test on May 25, 2022. On August 15 of the same year, the game received support from the "Special Fund for Cultural Development" issued by the Culture and Tourism Bureau of Xuhui District, Shanghai, where the developer is located. On August 23, 2022, a game story trailer was unveiled on the opening night of Gamescom 2022.

On January 17, 2023, the mobile version of the game received the game version number approved by the National Press and Publication Administration, and the game was approved for distribution in mainland China. On February 10, 2023, the game conducted its third closed test. On the same day, the Apple App Store page revealed that the official launch date of the game was April 26. In the international market, miHoYo launched more than 2,000 sets of ads on Google Play one month before the public beta of the game. The main advertising channel was Google AdMob and the main advertising areas were Japan, Hong Kong, the United States, Vietnam, and Thailand.

On March 24, 2023, versions for PlayStation 5 and PlayStation 4 were announced. The PlayStation 5 version would release on October 11, 2023, but the PlayStation 4 version has since been indefinitely delayed.

On April 25, 2023, miHoYo released the game's opening theme animation "Star Travel". The game was officially launched globally the following day on April 26. On April 28, miHoYo held its first theme exhibition "Galaxy Gathering" in Xujiahui. From April 29 to May 13, miHoYo undertook train advertisements on Xiamen Rail Transit Line 1 and jointly issued NFTs to promote the game. In mid-May, HoYoverse began to put up ads for the game in Japan, which are prominently displayed in Akihabara in Tokyo, as well as collaborating with Chichibu Railway in Saitama Prefecture to launch a special steam train service, which ran for a month. On July 13, miHoYo launched a high-speed train which ran from Shanghai to Wenzhou to promote the game.

In late 2023, the game collaborated internationally with a number of restaurant and cafe franchises, offering game merchandise and specialized meals. In Europe, the game collaborated with Domino's and Miss Millie’s in the UK from October 14 to November 14. In other countries of Asia, except for mainland China, there were collaborations in Japan, Indonesia, Malaysia, the Philippines, Singapore, Thailand, and Vietnam. In Japan, the game collaborated with Wendy's First Kitchen from October 11 to November 8. From October 11 to November 14, the collaboration in Indonesia with Convivium, La Juiceria Superfoods in Malaysia, Mann Hann in the Philippines, Kith in Singapore, Kogoro Katsu & Chicken Club in Thailand, and Piko Coffee in Vietnam. For Taiwan, Hong Kong, and Macau, there were collaborations with Cheogajip from October 18 to November 18, and with KFC from November 9 to November 22 in Hong Kong. In America, the game collaborated with Pelicana from December 1 to December 31. For specifically mainland China, there were countless collaborations with cafes, restaurants, drink shops, and many more.

In July 2025, HoYoverse announced a collaboration with the Japanese anime television series Fate/Stay Night: Unlimited Blade Works, in which the characters Saber and Archer would be added to the game as long-term banners. In October 2025, Crunchyroll, Sony's anime streaming service, announced a global collaboration between it and HoYoverse for an exclusive Honkai: Star Rail collab, starting on November 6, to coincide with the game's Version 3.7 update. As part of the collaboration, the HoYoFair program's Honkai: Star Rail "Chimerric Park" event premiered exclusively on Crunchyroll, making it the first time that the HoYoFair program did an event outside of YouTube.

On February 26, 2026, Epic Games announced a collaboration with Honkai: Star Rail for an exclusive tie-in collab with Fortnite, in which the characters Kafka and Blade would be added to the game.

In May 2026, HoYoverse held offline running events titled "Run to Elation" in Taichung, Taipei, Kaohsiung, and Hong Kong to promote the Planarcadia updates. Participants were given Planarcadia-themed goods for finishing the run.

== Reception ==
Reception

Aggregate scores
Aggregator	Score
Metacritic	PC: 80/100; PS5: 82/100
OpenCritic	90%

Review scores
Publication	Score
Eurogamer	Recommended
GamesRadar	4/5
IGN	9/10
PCGamer	90/100
Polygon	Very positive
RockPaperShotgun	Positive

Honkai: Star Rail received "generally favorable reviews" according to review aggregator Metacritic. Another review aggregator, OpenCritic, compiled 20 review articles, with 88% being positive.

Eurogamer recommended the game for its "delightfully goofy humour, charismatic voice cast, and truly magnificent combat," despite the writers' tendency to "give one sentence explanations for important details, yet spend eight paragraphs over explaining the simplest plot twist." Rock Paper Shotgun called the game "still in its early stages but (...) incredibly good fun to play," comparing it to "Star Ocean, but if everyone was hotter and you could gamble". The reviewer praised the combat system for being deep yet approachable and noted that, like in Genshin, spending money was not necessary to progress, as all content in the game could be cleared with the characters players receive for free. PC Gamer appreciated Star Rail's "impeccable visual style and strategic depth" and its "elastic tone, which fluctuates from the heroic optimism of a space opera, to the dark comedy of a Nier game, with a lot of Final Fantasy 14's soap opera, storytelling mixed in". To the reviewer, the game's main draw was its "sheer creativity" and that it "distills what's most satisfying about turn-based RPGs: tactical, team-based decisions." Jess Reyes from IGN referred to it as the best free-to-play game of 2023.

=== Popularity ===
Before the game's official release, the number of pre-registered players in mainland China reached 22.98 million, with an additional 10 million players outside of mainland China. On April 23, 2023, the day of pre-download, the game topped the free charts on the App Store in over 113 countries and regions, and ranked first overall in mainland China, the United States, Japan, and South Korea. After the game's global launch on April 26, it reached the top spot on the App Store's bestseller list in mainland China within five hours, and ranked within the top 10 on the bestseller lists in 42 countries and regions. On April 28, miHoYo announced that the game had exceeded 20 million downloads.

GameLook estimated that, on the day of its launch, the game's global revenue across all platforms would likely exceed CN¥100 million. According to data from Sensor Tower, within the first 10 days of launch, the mobile version of the game generated over US$100 million globally, with 44% of the revenue coming from China, 22% from Japan, and 12% from the United States. Data from DataEye indicated that within 15 days of launch, the iOS version and the Android version downloaded through Google Play had generated at least US$65 million, with Japan contributing a total of CN¥120 million. On February 6, 2024, with the launch of version 2.0, the game's download count exceeded 100 million. One estimation put the number of active players at 24 million in the month of April 2024.

=== Accolades ===
Year	Award	Category	Result	Ref(s).
2022	Golden Joystick Awards	Most Wanted Award	Nominated	
2023	Google Play Awards	Best Game	Won	
2023	Google Play Awards	Best Story	Won	
2023	Google Play Awards	Best for Tablets	Won	
2023	App Store Awards	iPhone Game of the Year	Won	
2023	The Game Awards 2023	Best Mobile Game	Won	
2023	UCG Game Awards	Mobile Game of the Year	Won	
2024	13th New York Game Awards	A-Train Award for Best Mobile Game	Won	
2024	27th Annual D.I.C.E. Awards	Mobile Game of the Year	Nominated	
2024	Google Play Awards	Best Ongoing Game	Won	
2024	Golden Joystick Awards	Still Playing Award (Mobile)	Won	
2024	Taipei Game Show Game Star Award	Gold Award (Console Game)	Won	
2026	Ultra Game Awards 2025	Mobile Game (Players' Voice)	Won	
