= Dan Heng =

Video game character

- Honkai character
- Official artwork
- First game: Honkai: Star Rail (2023)
- Voiced by: EN: Nicholas Leung; ZH: Li Chunyin; JA: Kent Itō; KO: Kim Hye-sung

In-universe information
- Species: Vidyadhara
- Weapon: Spear
- Origin: The Xianzhou Luofu
- Types: Wind, Imaginary, Physical
- Paths: The Hunt, Destruction, Preservation (combat); Trailblaze, Permanence (lore)

Dan Heng (Chinese: 丹恒; pinyin: Dān Héng) is a fictional character in the video game Honkai: Star Rail, developed by miHoYo. He is a member of a fictional organization called the Astral Express crew in the game, and accompanies the protagonist Trailblazer on missions. He is a Vidyadhara, a dragon-like species with a long lifespan related to the Aeon of Permanence, and is the reincarnation of a criminal known as Dan Feng. Dan Heng was released in version 1.0 of the game in 2023.

As of 2025, two alternative playable forms of Dan Heng have been released in the game. Dan Heng has been received positively by both critics and players, who complimented his role in the game's plot as well as a song used to tell his story.

== Design and voice acting ==
Dan Heng's first appearance was as early as October 7, 2021, in miHoYo's first gameplay demonstration trailer for Honkai: Star Rail, and is one of the first free characters players obtain upon starting the game. The developers say he is reserved and taciturn, wearing dark green Hanfu-style clothing and wielding a spear he calls Cloud-Piercer. His cold and quiet personality is connected to a past he is unwilling to reveal to other characters.

Dan Heng is the first character in Honkai: Star Rail other than the protagonist to have multiple playable versions. The first of these versions was a free 4-star Wind-type character following the Path of The Hunt. (Note: In Honkai: Star Rail, a Path defines a character's combat role and design philosophy. Characters on the Path of Preservation typically have defensive roles in combat such as shielding and damage mitigation. Characters on the Path of The Hunt are generally single-target DPSes, and characters on the Path of the Destruction are generally main DPSes.) After version 1.3 was released, a new form called Dan Heng • Imbibitor Lunae (丹恒·饮月; Dān Héng: Yǐn Yuè) was added as a limited-availability playable character. In the story, this form represents Dan Heng after awakening the power of the Vidyadhara High Elder, revealing him as the reincarnation of Dan Feng, who wielded the title of Imbibitor Lunae. Compared to the original Dan Heng, this version has noticeable differences in appearance and combat style. miHoYo also produced the song "Samudrartha", performed by Yusuf, for a scene in which Dan Heng uses the High Elder's power to split the sea. On October 15, 2025, a new form called Dan Heng • Permansor Terrae (丹恒·腾荒; Dān Héng: Téng Huāng) was released in version 3.6 of the game and made available to all players for free. All forms of Dan Heng are voiced in Chinese by Li Chunyin, in English by Nicholas Leung, in Japanese by Kent Itō, and in Korean by Kim Hye-sung.

== Appearances ==
=== Story ===
In the game, Dan Heng is the reincarnation of Dan Feng, the Vidyadhara High Elder of the starship known as the Xianzhou Luofu, who bore the title "Imbibitor Lunae". Several centuries before the game's events, during an incident known as the "Imbibitor Lunae Rebellion", Dan Feng attempted to free the Vidyadhara from their cycle of rebirth and also to revive a warrior who had died in battle. To do this, he conspired with Yingxing, a blacksmith, attempting to destroy the Luofu's Ambrosial Arbor. (Note: In the game, the Transmutation Arcanum is said to hold a secret that allows the Vidyadhara to escape the cycle of reincarnation and return to normal reproduction. The Ambrosial Arbor is an ancient artifact on the Xianzhou Luofu that has the power to alter life and death at will.) Instead, the Arbor produced a draconic abomination. Although the dragon was eventually slain, the disaster resulted in Dan Feng's imprisonment as the primary culprit, while Yingxing was corrupted by the Abundance and fell victim to a curse that resulted in insanity (referred to in the game as "mara"). Dan Feng avoided execution, but was forcibly reincarnated into Dan Heng and stripped of his horns and tail as punishment. Eventually, Dan Heng was exiled from the Xianzhou Alliance. After wandering the cosmos for some time, Dan Heng was eventually taken in by the Astral Express crew.

In the game's main storyline, Kafka, a wanted criminal, asks the Astral Express crew to stop at the Xianzhou Luofu to resolve a crisis involving a Stellaron (a powerful object which brings destruction to any planet it is placed on). Because of his past experiences, Dan Heng initially refuses to go. However, after learning that Yingxing, now known by the name Blade, is also on the Luofu and sensing that something is wrong, Dan Heng secretly travels there alone. On the Luofu, Dan Heng encounters Sushang of the Xianzhou's military and the traveling merchant Luocha, and the three set off on a journey together. Later, while searching for the Trailblazer and the other Astral Express passengers, Dan Heng follows the guidance of visions from his past life to Scalegorge Waterscape, where he meets Blade, who has been waiting for him. During the ensuing battle, Blade pierces Dan Heng through the chest, forcing him to reveal his Imbibitor Lunae form while on the brink of death. After learning that Dan Heng is actually the exiled Imbibitor Lunae, Yanqing, one of the local knights, attempts to capture both of them but is defeated when Dan Heng and Blade join forces. Upon the arrival of Jing Yuan, a powerful general, he asks Dan Heng for assistance in defeating Phantylia, a Lord Ravager of the Antimatter Legion, at the roots of the Ambrosial Arbor. (Note: The Antimatter Legion is a massive army of intergalactic monsters following the Path of Destruction and one of the game's primary antagonistic forces. Lord Ravagers serve as troop leadership.)

Dan Heng, still recovering from his experiences on the Xianzhou Luofu, decides not to accompany the rest of the Astral Express crew to their next destination, Penacony, and to stay on board the train instead. After that, he, the Trailblazer, and March 7th plan to enter Amphoreus, their next planned destination, together. However, March 7th, she falls unconscious due to unknown circumstances, forcing them to leave her behind on the train. Contact with the Astral Express is lost as the duo enters Amphoreus, and afterwards, the two of them investigate ways to save the planet from Zandar, a rogue robot. The Trailblazer is eventually kidnapped by Evernight, March 7th's alter ego, but Dan Heng rescues them and confronts her.

In Dan Heng's character story "The Dragon Returns Home", he seeks out Bailu, the current Vidyadhara High Elder. Together, they repair the seal on the Ambrosial Arbor, and Dan Heng learns the truth about the Imbibitor Lunae Rebellion, finally coming to understand the events of his previous life. Jing Yuan hopes to persuade Dan Heng to remain on the Xianzhou Luofu, but Dan Heng declines in favor of staying with the Astral Express crew.

=== Gameplay ===
Official portrait of Dan Heng • Imbibitor Lunae (left) and Permansor Terrae (right)

Dan Heng has three different playable forms in the game: Dan Heng, Dan Heng • Imbibitor Lunae, and Dan Heng • Permansor Terrae. The former is a free character available at the start of the game. He is a 4-star Wind-type character who follows the Path of The Hunt. His Basic Attack deals two instances of Wind damage to a single enemy. His Skill does the same, except with one more instance of damage. His ultimate deals a powerful single hit of Wind damage to one enemy.

Dan Heng • Imbibitor Lunae is a 5-star Imaginary-type character who follows the Path of Destruction. His Basic Attack deals Imaginary damage either to up to three enemies, with the damage increasing depending on how many times his attack has been enhanced by his Skill. His Skill enhances his Basic Attack up to three times. His ultimate deals Imaginary damage to a selected enemy and adjacent targets.

Dan Heng • Permansor Terrae is a 5-star Physical damage dealer who follows the Path of Preservation. His Basic Attack deals Physical damage to a single enemy. His Skill designates a single ally as a "Bondmate" and provides all allies with a shield that can offset damage; this shield can stack with other shields. His ultimate deals Physical Damage and provides another shield (also stackable) to all allies.

=== Character song ===
"Samudrartha" is an insert song used to tell Dan Heng's story and performed by Yusuf. Specifically, it mentions his transformation into the Vidyadhara High Elder and his splitting of the sea. It portrays the image of a youth and a dragon breaking through restraints and cutting through obstacles to move ahead. miHoYo released the music video on July 20.

In an interview between the Beijing News and miHoYo's music team, HOYO-MiX, it was explained that the title originates from the name of the traditional Chinese ci poetic tune pattern "Shui Long Yin" (水龙吟; 'Water dragon chant'), but the lyrics themselves do not follow the classical meter structure, instead using vernacular language to convey elements of traditional Chinese culture. The team said they hoped the song would help players become familiar with traditional Chinese music.

== Promotion ==
From late August to early September 2023, miHoYo placed advertisements for Dan Heng • Imbibitor Lunae on large LED screens in commercial districts across eight cities in China, including Shanghai, Beijing, Guangzhou, Shenzhen, Hangzhou, Nanjing, Chongqing and Wuhan. Offline photo check-in events were also held alongside the advertising campaign.

On September 22, 2023, Honkai: Star Rail collaborated with KFC in China, launching a special themed meal set. Customers who purchased the set received a holographic ticket featuring Dan Heng and March 7th. The game later held similar collaborations in other regions; in October and November in Taiwan and Hong Kong, respectively. miHoYo also launched a co-branded pair of glasses with Japanese eyewear brand Zoff.

== Reception ==
Dan Heng was introduced as a playable character in version 1.0 of the game. As a member of the Astral Express, he accompanies the player throughout the main story and has been well-received by players and critics. Some fans have expressed their appreciation through cosplay, as well as creating fan art.

Siliconera editor Jenny Lada praised miHoYo for briefly making Dan Heng the central protagonist during part of the Xianzhou Luofu storyline. She wrote that this reinforced the idea that the Trailblazer (the player) "isn't the most important person in the universe", and that other characters can also be crucial and central to the story. Compared with the side-story format often used in Genshin Impact, she argued that Honkai: Star Rail's approach allows players to better understand how other perspectives and characters shape the game's narrative. Rather than simply presenting text on a black screen explaining events, the game lets players witness the experiences and importance of these characters more directly. Inverse writer Jess Reyes wrote that Dan Heng is "clearly" the most mysterious out of all the characters on the Astral Express, and quoted a Reddit post comparing Dan Heng to Blade, writing that the latter's past is also mysterious and speculating that Dan Heng could have been "the king of Vidyadharas", or that he may have been the one to curse Blade with immortality. PCGamesN writer Lauren Bergin compared Imbibitor Lunae to the original Dan Heng, but said he was "better and prettier". She also agreed that he was the most mysterious out of all the Trailblazer's companions.

Since its release, the song "Samudrartha" has attracted attention and praise from players around the world. The EP video for the song ranked among the top three on Bilibili's sitewide charts on the day it was uploaded. Although the song's lyrics are in Chinese, "Samudrartha" has also been popular in other countries such as Japan and the United States. According to a report from the Beijing News, a player from Chile was inspired by the song and created a Spanish-language cover of it. The player also produced fan art depicting scenes such as Dan Heng as a child; the fan art was well-received by other players, and the video reached 350,000 views.
