= Sparkle (Honkai: Star Rail) =

Video game character

- Honkai character
- Official artwork
- First game: Honkai: Star Rail (2024) (Note: Sparxie was released in 2026.)
- Voiced by: EN: Lizzie Freeman; ZH: Zhao Shuang; JA: Reina Ueda; KO: Seong Ye-won

In-universe information
- Species: Human (Sparkle); Imagenae (Sparxie)
- Home: Unknown (Note: On her character profile her home is listed as "Cosmic", indicating that Sparkle does not have a singular place she calls home. Her planet of origin (birth) has not yet been stated.) (Sparkle); Planarcadia (Sparxie)
- Types: Quantum (Sparkle); Fire (Sparxie)
- Paths: Harmony (Sparkle); Elation (Sparxie)

Sparkle (Chinese: 花火; pinyin: Huāhuǒ; lit. 'fireworks') is a character in the video game Honkai: Star Rail, published by miHoYo. In the game, she is a member of the Masked Fools, an intergalactic organization devoted to elation and fun. She was released in version 2.0 of the game in February 2024, and received favorable reviews for her cute appearance and intrigue.

In 2026, an alternate version of Sparkle called Sparxie (火花; Huǒhuā; 'spark') was released in version 4.0 of the game. In the game, Sparxie is a livestreamer originally created by Sparkle to run her livestream accounts when Sparkle herself was not able to. Sparxie was also praised for her appearance.

== Design and voice acting ==
Sparkle was first mentioned in-game in version 1.4 of the game, which was released on October 11, 2023. Sparkle's character illustration, damage type and Path were first revealed by miHoYo on December 14, 2023. On February 26, miHoYo released another trailer called "Sparkle: Behind the Curtain" which revealed that Sparkle was able to shapeshift in order to assume different identities. The trailer explained that the Masked Fools, of which she is a member, were a group dedicated to pleasure and who followed the Path of Elation. On February 27, 2024, a trailer called Monodrama was released which hinted at Sparkle's ability to take on many identities and her place in the game's lore. A few hours before she was set to be released, miHoYo released a 2D animated video hinting at the role she would play in the game's story, as well as another video discussing her abilities in combat. She was officially released in version 2.0 of the game on February 29, 2024. She is the fourth member of the Masked Fools overall that the protagonist meets in the game, and the second one to be a playable character. On June 20, 2024, a cinematic trailer entitled "The Great Tatalov Salutes You" was released which showed Sparkle explaining the reasoning behind her actions in the game's storyline.

On January 2, 2026, HoYoverse revealed that an alternative form of Sparkle, called Sparxie, would be released as a separate playable character in version 4.0 of the game, having released a trailer revealing Sparxie's appearance and hinting at her profession a day earlier. Sparxie was revealed to be Sparkle's alternate persona, and was a famous livestreamer on her home planet of Planarcadia. She was described by Delle Tribdino of GameDaily as an attention-seeking, fun-loving and mischievous character who likes pranks and who seems to long for the spotlight. Sparxie was released as a playable character on February 14, 2026; she is the third character from the Masked Fools to be a playable character. February 24 saw the release of "Sparxie: Never Gonna Desert You", an analysis of her combat abilities provided by HoYoverse. The company uploaded a full-length trailer called "Ravings" on March 1, 2026, which discussed Sparxie's character and showed her streaming.

Sparkle and Sparxie are voiced in English by Lizzie Freeman, in Chinese by Zhao Shuang, in Japanese by Reina Ueda, and in Korean by Seong Ye-won. In an interview, Ueda said that Sparkle looks innocent, but actually has the temperament of a "little devil" and likes to tease others while smiling mischievously. She also thinks that the way the character speaks in the Japanese dub (that is, by using her name in place of a first-person pronoun) is both cunning and cute. Ueda also mentioned that Sparkle seems to only pursue happiness and fun on the outside, but that there are still things she cares about. In another interview, Ueda said that Sparxie was a popular livestreamer active in Duomension City, a major city in Planarcadia. She prefers improvisation and pranks, and accumulates popularity by creating internet memes and encouraging viewers to leave comments and interact with her stream. Ueda summarized the character's charm as a "combination of innocence and danger".

== Appearances ==
=== Story ===
==== Penacony ====
Sparkle is said to pursue elation in all that she does, and views the world as a joke. She values fun and enjoyment, and lives a carefree life. After the Trailblazer, the game's protagonist, enters the dream planet of Penacony and meets Firefly, the two of them decide to go sightseeing, during which Firefly notices that they are being followed. The Trailblazer recognizes the man as Sampo, a Masked Fool seen earlier in the game. Eventually, Sampo gets the Trailblazer by themselves and tells them that Firefly is suspicious, which causes the Trailblazer to attempt to locate her again. The Trailblazer witnesses a conversation in which Sparkle confronts Aventurine, a senior manager of the Interastral Peace Corporation (IPC) who has been stalking her. She clarifies to him that the Masked Fools are not on good terms with the IPC. Sampo later realizes that the Trailblazer had not heeded his warning that Firefly was suspicious. It is then revealed that "Sampo" was actually Sparkle, who shapeshifted into Sampo, all along. She knocks both Firefly and the Trailblazer unconscious and sends them elsewhere in the dreamscape, where a woman calling herself Black Swan explains that Sparkle's abilities are tied to illusions and hallucinations.

Sparkle later appears disguised as Robin, a famous singer. As the conflict unfolds, Robin's brother Sunday, Penacony's ruler, is revealed to be trying to remake Penacony into an eternal dream under the Path of Order. (Note: In Honkai: Star Rail's lore, Paths are manifestations of universal philosophical concepts. A person is considered to be "on" a Path when their will overlaps with the characteristics of that Path. For example, characters on the Path of Remembrance often have something to do with memory. Only certain Paths are available for use in combat; characters who use other Paths in the lore are assigned alternative Paths that they use in combat instead.) This ideological divide leads to a decisive battle which ended in the Trailblazer's group being defeated and drawn into the dream. In the end, the group defeats Sunday. At a celebratory banquet aboard a cruise ship, Sparkle claims she has planted bombs on board, causing everyone to work together to defuse them. The "bombs" were revealed to be fireworks instead.

It is later revealed that Sparkle has been secretly assisting Firefly at Silver Wolf's request. She previously passed along a warning regarding Penacony's Dreammaster and disguised herself as Sunday so she would be able to approach Robin and send her into the dreamscape. When everyone was trapped within the sweet dream, she detonated bombs she had planted throughout Penacony in advance, allowing the group to break through the layered dream and launch a counterattack against him.

==== Planarcadia ====
Official portrait of Sparxie

The Astral Express later arrives on the technologically advanced planet of Planarcadia, where Sparkle greets them in disguise and claims to be their tour guide. As Sparkle shows the Trailblazer and March 7th around, they learn about the Phantasmoon Games, a major ritual competition tied to the Aeon of Elation. Sparkle eventually reveals that a streamer called Sparxie is competing in the Games. Sparxie is an imagenae, a being born from wishes. Sparxie believes that the IPC intends to initiate a corporate takeover of Planarcadia. After a confrontation, Sparxie traps the Trailblazer and March 7th inside a surreal school scenario where she has taken over as acting dean using her powers. They successfully locate a mask that is needed to participate in the Games, but not before Sparxie outsmarts them by disguising herself and taking the mask for herself, officially becoming a Supplicant (the term for a participant in the Games). After the Trailblazer escapes the school, Sparkle explains that Sparxie is actually an old virtual avatar of hers which gained sentience after enough public attention. Meanwhile, Sparxie publicly announces an upcoming livestream event which stars the Astral Express crew as unwilling participants.

The Trailblazer reunites with Himeko, Sparkle, and the rest of the Astral Express crew, and they investigate Sparxie's larger plan. They discover she has stolen a memetic virus that could turn Planarcadia's people into copies of herself, forcing Sparkle to confront the consequences of the identity she once discarded. In the final confrontation, Sparkle distracts Sparxie while the Astral Express crew regroups, and the Trailblazer defeats her as Himeko suppresses the virus. In the aftermath, Sparxie and Sparkle merge into each other and seem happy to share an identity. Sparxie's livestream got permanently banned by Planarcadia authorities as a result of her antics.

==== Honkai Impact 3rd ====
Sparkle briefly appears as a crossover character in Honkai Impact 3rd, interacting with Vita, a character who appears earlier in the story. She shapeshifts into multiple figures from Vita's accounts and proposes disrupting the governing "system" as a staged spectacle. Sparkle ultimately invites Vita to join the Masked Fools by offering a set of masks, which Vita accepts.

=== Gameplay ===
Sparkle is a 5-star character who deals Quantum damage and who is on the Path of Harmony. (Note: Characters who deal Quantum damage typically delay the actions of enemies in the game's combat turn order after their toughness bar is fully depleted. In Honkai: Star Rail, a Path defines a character's combat role and design philosophy. Characters on the Path of Harmony typically focus on applying buffs to allies.) Her Basic Attack deals a percentage of her Attack statistic to a single enemy. Her Skill can be used on anyone in her team including herself, increasing the target's critical hit damage. If used on another character, that character's turn is advanced forward. Her ultimate recovers four Skill Points for the team. Skill Points are needed for characters to activate their Skills in combat. It also grants all allies the Cipher status effect; when allies with this effect trigger the damage boost effect provided by her Skill, the damage dealt is increased. Sparkle's passive Talent increases the maximum number of Skill Points in the team, and she can increase damage dealt by allies when someone uses a Skill Point. Her Technique, a mechanic which is used outside of combat, allows the party to avoid detection by enemies and recovers Skill Points at the start of the next battle while in effect.

Sparxie is a 5-star character who deals Fire damage and who is on the Path of Elation. Her Basic Attack, called "Cat Got Your Flametongue?", deals Fire damage equal to a percentage of her attack to a single target. Sparxie's Skill starts a livestream in combat and triggers an effect called "Engagement Farming" one time. While her Skill is in effect, "Engagement Farming" can be triggered up to 20 more times. Her Talent enhances her abilities in combat, which deal Fire damage depending on the number of stacks of "Engagement Farming". Her ultimate causes her to gain Punchline points and deals area-of-effect damage to all enemies.

When a character on the Path of Elation is in the team, Aha, the Aeon of Elation, gains a turn in the game's combat turn order. Players gain a stack of Punchline for every Elation character in the party to start with and can gain more stacks of it using those characters. When it is Aha's turn, all stacks of Punchline are consumed, debuffs are removed from allies, and the Skills of all Elation characters are triggered in succession. If there are no Elation characters in the party, Aha himself deals damage to enemies. Aha is not affected by any buffs or debuffs that are applied to allies, and his place in the turn order is affected by how many Elation characters are in the party.

== Promotion ==
miHoYo collaborated with Japanese store chain Lawson to release merchandise for Sparkle, Aventurine and other characters such as Acheron inside Lawson stores in April 2024; three such stores decorated their exteriors with characters from the game. miHoYo released Sparkle as a playable crossover character in version 7.9 of Honkai Impact 3rd in October 2024. Her playstyle remained largely the same as in Honkai: Star Rail, except that she deals Fire damage instead. Her battlesuit was called "Thousand Faced Maestro: Cameo!". miHoYo also launched a collaboration with Ediya Coffee in South Korea from August 19 to September 15, 2025. On April 1, 2026, HoYoverse uploaded an animated short to its HoYoFair YouTube channel as part of the game's April Fools' Day promotion, featuring a cover of the Rick Astley song "Never Gonna Give You Up", a song associated with rickrolling. The video features Sparxie alongside Evanescia, Silver Wolf, and Blade, with English vocals provided by Sparxie's voice actor Lizzie Freeman. In May 2026, Sega announced that they would begin selling a Sparxie plush, which is expected to ship in 2027.

== Reception ==
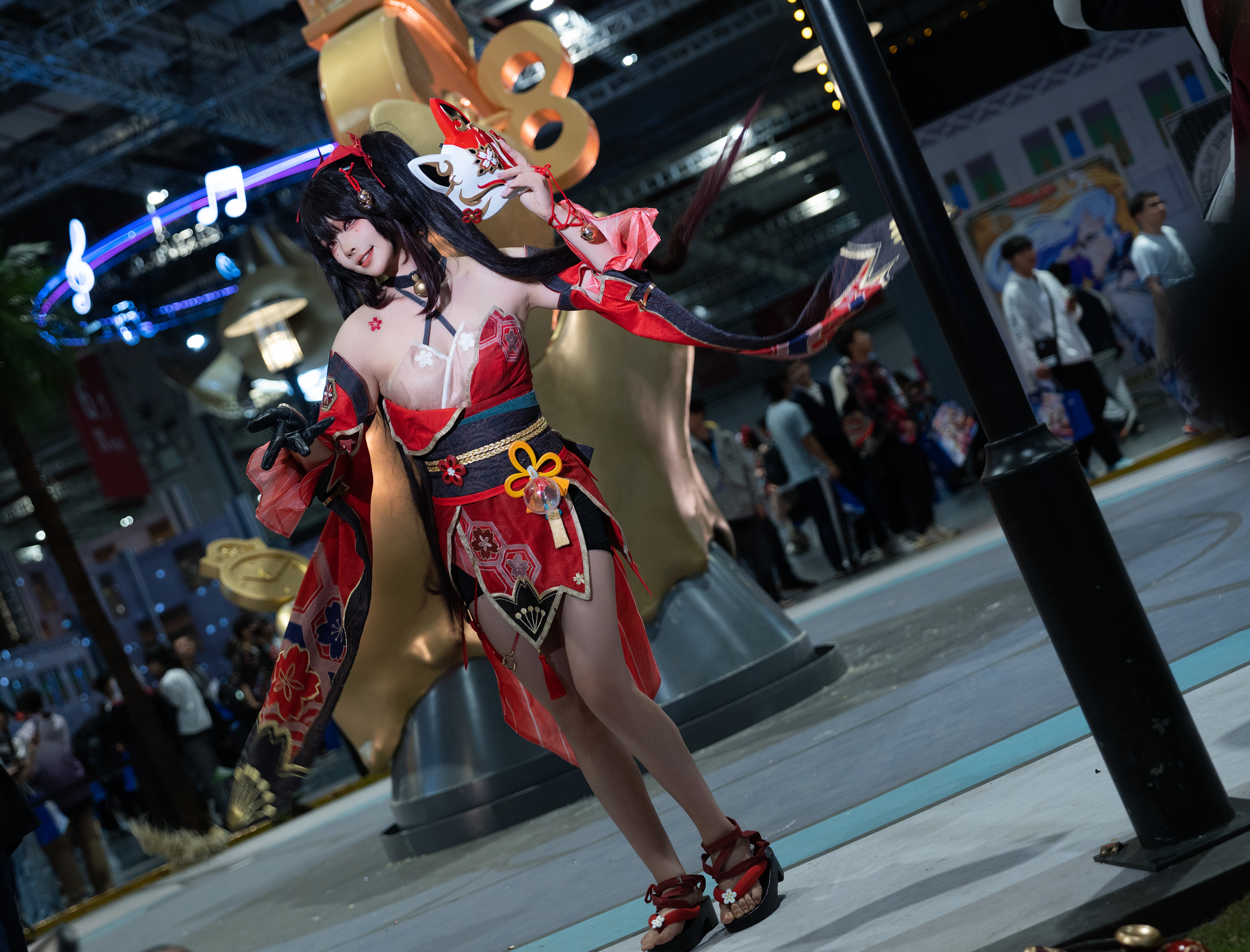
Cosplay of Sparkle

Sparkle has been generally well received by players and critics. Fans have expressed their fondness for the character through cosplay and creating derivative works.

Sparkle's character development and story have garnered praise from critics. Yan Ku of Yahoo News wrote that she expected Sparkle to "cause some chaos" in Penacony. An anonymous writer for Famitsu dubbed her a ruthless "master of dangerous theater" who could play a large number of roles. On January 2, 2026, Delle Tribdino of Game Daily speculated that players would learn more about Sparkle while completing the Planarcadia part of the game's story and wrote that Sparxie was "willing to go to great lengths" to attract attention. GameSpot's Cheri Faulkner wrote in a general review of version 4.0 of the game that Sparkle's character development "really gave [Faulkner] joy", saying that Sparkle was not much more than a background character beforehand and that she felt more relatable than she did before. She attributed this to the Trailblazer learning about Sparkle's inner fears and desires. Writer Jisumarokku of Denfaminico Gamer described both Sparkle and Sparxie as high-energy, so much so that their head started to feel dizzy. They described the fight between Sparkle and Sparxie as "truly ugly" and not something they would expect from a popular livestreamer.

Writing for United Daily News, Hilo called Sparkle's appearance cute and her voice scary. A writer for Famitsu somewhat concurred in calling her cute. Writer Sode Canon of Denfaminico Gamer said the same for Sparxie, and called her visuals great and gestures adorable. He wrote that his brain had been "fried" by Sparxie, who he called beautiful. In the headline analyzing her character, he added, "Whether she's moving or still, she's just overflowing with cuteness, it's unfair!" Hilo additionally wrote in 2023 that Sparkle's twin ponytails and feet caused players to react enthusiastically to her, describing their reaction as going wild. (Note: Her feet are bare in her official artwork, but not in her actual gameplay.) Writer Kotomegu of Dengeki Online described Sparxie as looking like fireworks and said she was "much-talked-about".

Sparkle's trailer, Monodrama, was also well received. Stephanie Liu of Siliconera called it "trippy", but wrote that the trailer features a number of flashing lights, and recommended that certain people exercise caution while watching it. Players felt that the trailer "perfectly captured" both Sparkle's yandere nature and her madness.

Monodrama was found by some viewers to resemble the works of LeaF, a Japanese music producer. In response to the allegation of plagiarism, LeaF was asked to comment and said that neither he nor his producers, Optie and Fiz, were involved in the production of Monodrama. However, he also clarified that he did not take issue with the trailer and hoped to gain more exposure as a result of it, defining the trailer as a tribute to him, Optie, and Fiz. Another reason LeaF had no problem with miHoYo doing this was because the trailer "wasn't a one-to-one recreation" of his works, wrote Stephanie Liu of Siliconera. Many people on the internet sympathized with LeaF but admired his nonchalant attitude toward the situation. The background music in Sparxie's trailer "Ravings" is a remixed version of the music in Monodrama.

Reina Ueda's portrayal of both Sparxie and Sparkle in the Japanese dub drew praise. Writer Jisumarokku of Denfaminico Gamer complimented her "insane concentration" and that he was driven crazy by it. He further added that the confrontation between Sparkle and Sparxie in the story was just Ueda fighting herself the entire time and added, "Can these guys still go crazier"? They added that they had exceeded their tolerance for Reina Ueda's energy because of how prevalent her voice was. Kotomegu concurred in complementing Ueda's voice acting, calling it "slightly sticky, yet incredibly cute and distinctive" and praising her ability to differentiate between the voices she used for Sparkle and Sparxie. They said that it would be tough to decide which of the two they preferred more, but they would pick Sparxie if they had to choose due to a combat animation in which Sparxie's cheeks appearing to press up against the screen leaving a strong impression on them.
