= Silver Wolf (Honkai: Star Rail) =

Video game character

- Honkai character
- Official artwork
- First game: Honkai: Star Rail (2023)
- Voiced by: EN: Melissa Fahn; ZH: Hanser; JA: Kana Asumi; KO: Jang Mi

In-universe information
- Home: Punklorde
- Types: Quantum, Imaginary
- Paths: Nihility (combat), Finality (lore), Elation

Silver Wolf (Chinese: 银狼; pinyin: Yín Láng) is a fictional character from Honkai: Star Rail, a 2023 turn-based role-playing gacha game developed and published by miHoYo. She is a member of the in-game organization known as the Stellaron Hunters. She is known for her love of video games, and is a genius-level hacker who views the universe as a game. Silver Wolf was added to the game's gacha system in version 1.1.

In 2026, a new playable version was released for version 4.2 called Silver Wolf LV.999. Silver Wolf was generally well received, with reviewers praising her gameplay abilities and personality as well-developed.

== Release ==
Official artwork of Silver Wolf LV.999

Honkai: Star Rail was released in April 2023. Silver Wolf first appeared in version 1.0 of the game, in the first mission of the main story where players control her and fellow Stellaron Hunter Kafka. On June 2, 2023, miHoYo released Silver Wolf's character trailer, "Got a Date?", which showcased her combat animations and abilities. The game launched a promotional event for Silver Wolf on June 6, 2023, in which a message indicating that player's systems were about to be hacked appeared on their screens with a pixelated image of Silver Wolf's face. The event asked players if they wanted to contribute their Twitter accounts as part of Silver Wolf's hacking plan. Simply changing their profile icons to the provided avatar qualified the user for official participation; if the number of participants exceeded 50,000 by June 14, the developers would award players with in-game currency. However, only 26,000 players had participated as of June 6. After the version 1.1 update, players could obtain Silver Wolf through the game's gacha system.

On February 3, "Myriad Celestia Trailer: 'Anti-Destruction Alliance'" was released, showing Silver Wolf's new abilities in her LV.999 form and indicating that her hacking abilities in the lore had been increased dramatically by Elio, leader of the Stellaron Hunters. On March 10, 2026, miHoYo revealed that Silver Wolf LV.999 would be a playable character. On April 18, 2026, miHoYo released a trailer for Silver Wolf LV.999 entitled "Solo Maxxing". Silver Wolf LV.999 became playable in version 4.2 of the game on April 21. On April 26, the company released another promotional video focusing on her called "Relax, I'm Just Playing Around".

Both versions of Silver Wolf are voiced in Chinese by Hanser, in English by Melissa Fahn, in Japanese by Kana Asumi, and in Korean by Jang Mi.

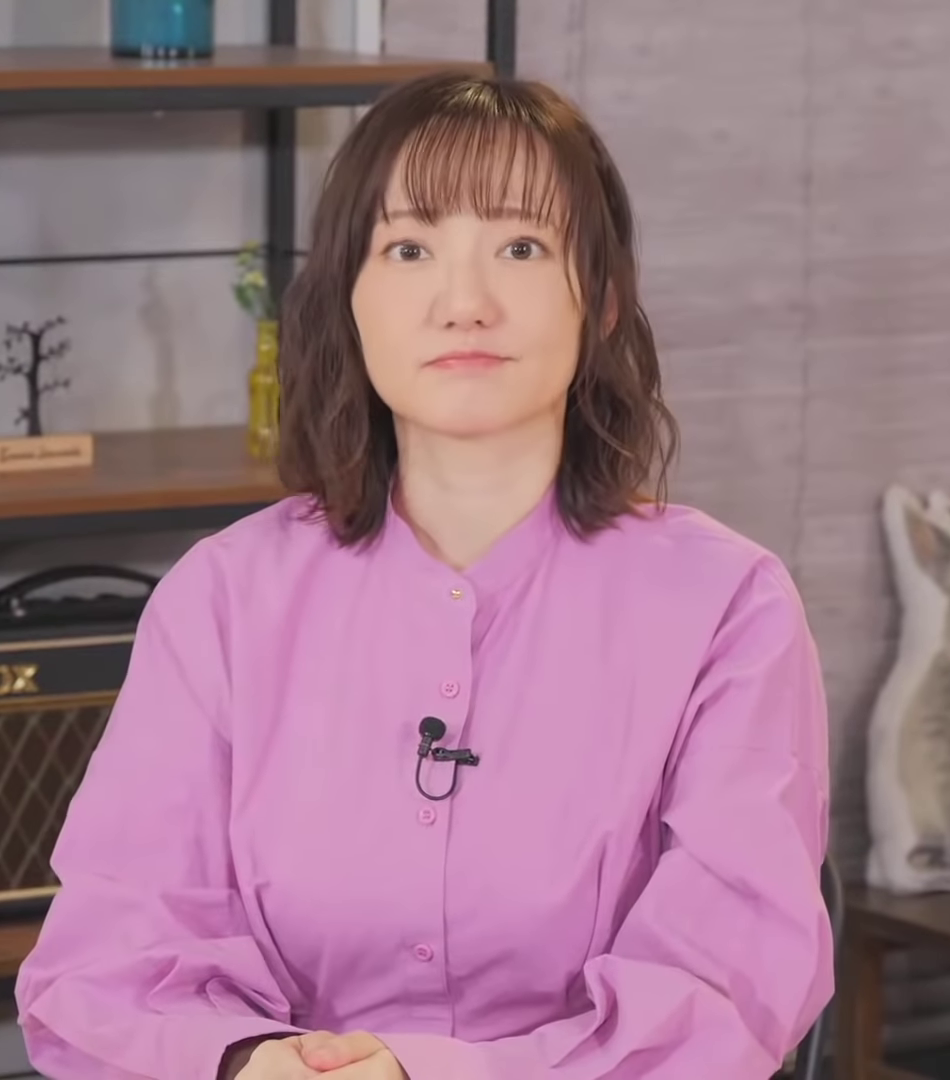
Kana Asumi, Silver Wolf's Japanese voice actress, in 2021

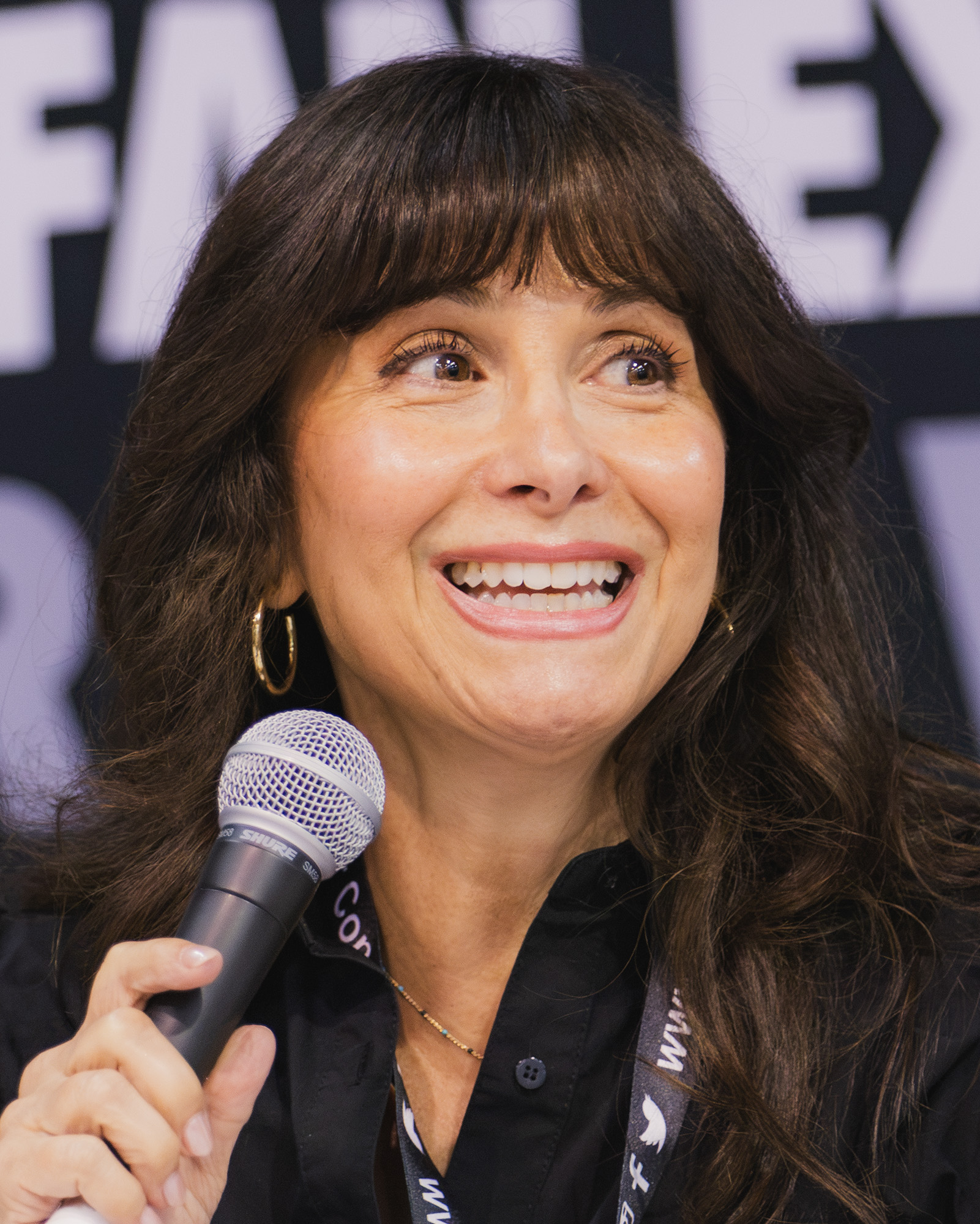
Melissa Fahn, Silver Wolf's English voice actress, in 2026

== Appearances ==
Silver Wolf is a hacker who views the universe as a game, and comes from a planet of hackers known as Punklorde. Silver Wolf has mastered a technique known as "aether editing", which enables her to alter the data of reality itself and hack into various defensive systems. Silver Wolf is the last member to join the Stellaron Hunters, an intergalactic criminal organization dedicated to finding and sealing Stellarons. Stellarons are powerful objects capable of causing a significant amount of destruction. Silver Wolf has a love for video games and is considered a genius. She once engaged in a hacking battle with Screwllum, a member of the Genius Society, but lost.

In the game's opening quest, Silver Wolf lures the antagonistic Antimatter Legion to a space station owned by Herta, another Genius Society member. Kafka, accompanying Silver Wolf, releases the game's protagonist, the Trailblazer, from a receptacle where they had been kept, puts a Stellaron inside their body, and subsequently wipes their memories. Kafka then escapes with Silver Wolf. Silver Wolf is later revealed to have hacked into the defense systems of the Xianzhou Alliance, a group of starships, to allow the Trailblazer and friends to board so they can investigate an incident regarding a Stellaron on the Xianzhou Luofu. On the planet of Penacony, Silver Wolf sends a message to the Trailblazer during an investigation into the planet's Dreamscape, which was supposed to be under renovation.

Later, Silver Wolf enters the planet of Planarcadia looking for a powerful stolen mask which, if worn, would give the wearer a chance to become the Aeon of Elation (Note: In Honkai: Star Rail's lore, Paths are manifestations of universal philosophical concepts. A person is considered to be "on" a Path when their will overlaps with the characteristics of that Path. For example, characters on the Path of Remembrance often have something to do with memory. Only certain Paths are available for use in combat; characters who use other Paths in the lore are assigned alternative Paths that they use in combat instead. In combat, a Path defines a character's combat role and design philosophy. Characters on the Path of Nihility are known for applying debuffs to enemies.) for one minute by winning a competition known as the Phantasmoon Games. Silver Wolf hires Ashveil, a detective, to track it down, then uses hacking and eavesdropping to uncover that Pearl, a powerful member of the Interastral Peace Corporation and the planet's chief executive, has other masks at her disposal. She negotiates with Pearl by offering information and is later commissioned by her to trace the source of the Joy Ascendant outbreak, leading Silver Wolf to uncover an imposter posing as Pearl and the hidden manipulator Asat Pramad, also known as Mr. Meanie. By this time, Silver Wolf has transformed into her LV.999 form, which she says is her final form, and uses her technical skills and reality-altering abilities to support the Trailblazer's group, open a shortcut to Fulwish—the Planarcadian media mogul who fused with the cells of Shuhu—and help compress Shuhu's flesh into the body of Blade, another Stellaron Hunter. Shuhu is an entity whose regenerative flesh is responsible for Blade's immortality. She tries to talk Blade out of sacrificing himself to the Aeon of Voracity, but ultimately recognizes that the decision is not hers to make and stays with him as he prepares, openly afraid that he will not survive. She is relieved to see that he is in fact alive.

In the Companion Mission "Punklorde Mentality" she hacks into the space station once again in an attempt to find a game cartridge of the same name. In the Simulated Universe, she encounters Screwllum and Herta again, and ultimately flees in panic after her game accounts are frozen by Herta.

=== Gameplay ===
Silver Wolf is a 5-star rarity character following the Path of Nihility. She deals Quantum-type damage in battle. Her Basic Attack deals Quantum damage to a single enemy. She uses Bugs to interrupt enemies' lines of attack, which can be triggered with her Basic Attack. This lowers the enemies' attack, speed, and defense statistics. After attacking an enemy with her Skill, Silver Wolf has a chance to implant a Weakness matching an ally's damage type onto the enemy, while also reducing the enemy's resistance to said element. At first, Silver Wolf's ultimate could reduce the defense of a single enemy. However, in version 3.4 of the game, Silver Wolf received a buff in which her ultimate was changed from a single-target attack to an area-of-effect attack. Her ultimate also deals Quantum damage.

Silver Wolf LV.999 is a 5-star rarity Imaginary character following the Path of Elation, and functions as a main DPS. She deals Imaginary-type damage in battle. She can use her Skill to deal Imaginary damage to all enemies. Silver Wolf LV.999 can activate her ultimate in battle by accumulating points of "Hidden MMR" (which is done by using her attacks or via the Elation mechanism), entering the "Godmode Player" state. While in this state, she can activate a state called "Secret Level Maxed", enhancing her Basic Attack and Elation Skill. During this time, allies' actions have a chance to trigger Silver Wolf LV.999's "Top Loot Box", which has three random attack effects. After using three enhanced Basic Attacks, she exits the Godmode Player state. Silver Wolf LV.999 also has a special ability which removes and prevents crowd-control effects from affecting allies.

When a character on the Path of Elation is in the team, Aha, the Aeon of Elation, gains a turn in the game's combat turn order. Punchline is a team-shared stat used to calculate Elation damage. Players gain a stack of Punchline for every Elation character in the party to start with and can gain more stacks of it using those characters. When it is Aha's turn, all stacks of Punchline are consumed, debuffs are removed from allies, and the Skills of all Elation characters are triggered in succession. If there are no Elation characters in the party, Aha himself deals damage to enemies. Aha is not affected by any buffs or debuffs that are applied to allies, and his place in the turn order is affected by how many Elation characters are in the party.

== Promotion ==
In August 2023, Taiwanese tea chain COMEBUY collaborated with miHoYo to release three character-themed drinks: one each for Kafka, Blade, and Silver Wolf. The drinks also came with gifts including in-game item cards featuring Kafka, exclusive character stickers and coasters. On the first day of the campaign, stores were surrounded by fans, with lines continuing for a full twelve hours.

In April 2026, miHoYo collaborated with Hatsune Miku to release a music video featuring Silver Wolf LV.999 and Miku at an arcade together playing a musical video game. Diana Velásquez Vargas of GameRant said that it was "arguably the gacha's biggest collaboration" since an earlier one with Fortnite involving Blade and Kafka. In May, Galleria released a gaming PC based on Silver Wolf LV.999 which came with a controller stand and customized cursor. That same month, arcade chain Round1 collaborated with miHoYo to release merchandise featuring Blade, Silver Wolf, Kafka and Firefly at their locations in the United States.

== Reception ==
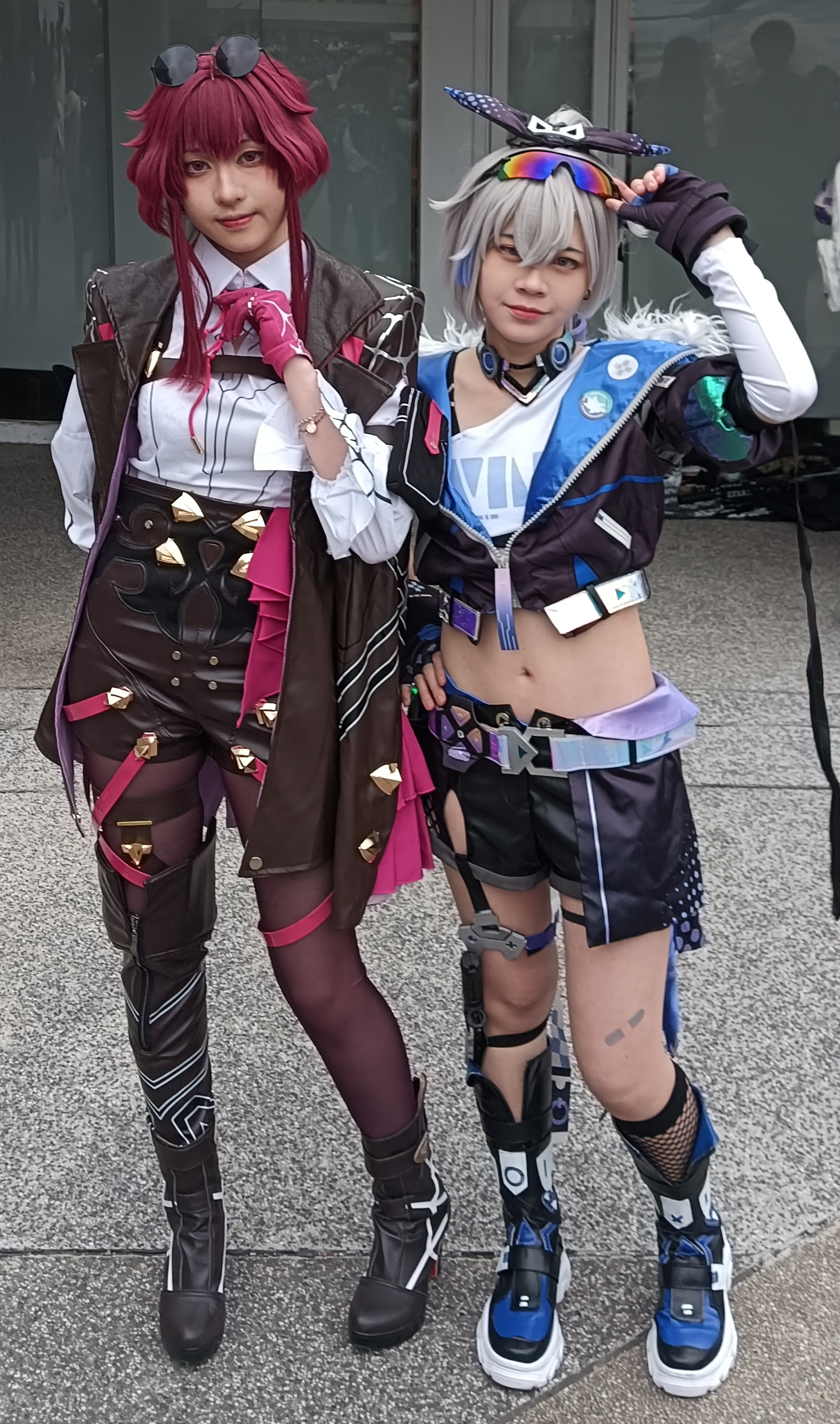
Cosplayers of Kafka (left) and Silver Wolf (right)

Silver Wolf was generally received well. Fans showed appreciation for the character via cosplay. Celine Jaeckel praised her appearance, calling her the "cutest hacker in the entire world" and saying that her sassy personality makes her "ten times more adorable, even if she wouldn't want to hear that". She called her character fascinating, and jokingly advised players against making her their enemy, even if she has a soft heart. Tilly Lawton of Pocket Tactics characterized her as a tsundere due to her general demeanor, and associated her with leet (1337), a system of modified spellings used on the Internet. Jordan Lemons of Prima Games called her a mysterious character, and characterized her personality as "a little sour", but speculated that she can give the Trailblazer some tips if they play video games together.

Daz Skubich of Pocket Tactics said that Silver Wolf was desperate to participate in the Phantasmoon Games on Planarcadia and secure an audience with Aha, but speculated that Silver Wolf was likely not worried about the prize in comparison to the actual Games. He also said that Silver Wolf had become famous for her hacking skills, and that she would likely do anything she could to bend the Phantasmoon Games' rules in her favor. He added, "[a]re the Stellaron Hunters here to cause trouble, or does this gamer just need her fix?" Silver Wolf LV.999 appeared to be invincible according to a writer from 4Gamer, who noted that she had achieved the title "Cosmic Champion" and had "full completion of galactic achievements"; they wondered what Silver Wolf would aim to do next. A writer for AUTOMATON analyzed Silver Wolf's personality by playing Refind Self: The Personality Test Game, in which the player's personality is revealed via gameplay, from Silver Wolf's perspective. Silver Wolf, they said, tends to stand out for her cool and cheeky words and behavior towards others, but that she spent all her time alone on Punklorde before joining the Stellaron Hunters. She seems to worry a lot about her companions, so she may sympathize with the concept of loneliness. In the end, they characterized her as a juvenile delinquent, or banchō, indicating that in Refind Self, the term refers to a powerful character willing to do whatever it takes to solve problems, and that can "achieve goals better than anyone else". Silver Wolf, they said, had to "begin life on hard mode" and aimed to achieve her goals by ignoring rules via hacking, so this designation fits her character well.

Silver Wolf was compared to a character from Honkai Impact 3rd; she was seen as an expy of the character Bronya Zaychik, who first debuted in that game and subsequently received a separate expy (named Bronya Rand) in Honkai: Star Rail. According to Yahoo News writer Yan Ku, Silver Wolf is lifted from an alternate version of Bronya Zaychik called "Haxxor Bunny"; they are both prodigies with technology. Stephanie Liu of Siliconera also made the connection to Honkai Impact 3rd, describing a scene in which Silver Wolf is playing the aforementioned game as Bronie, only for her gaming account to get frozen.

Silver Wolf's trailers were also analyzed by reviewers. Liu characterized the feel of "Got a Date?" as very futuristic and abundant in references to retro video games. Catherine Daro of GameSpace said the same of "Solo Maxxing", writing that there were references to specific games such as Tetris and Pac-Man. In it, she is shown acting like a gamer who prioritizes games over daily life, with fellow Stellaron Hunter Blade urging her to eat; she seemed to be hooked on a dice-based game at the time, according to an analyst from AUTOMATON. Her trailers were not the only place in which there were references to other games; Silver Wolf LV.999's idle animations consist of her playing a game similar to Beat Saber. Additionally, she has made references to action, adventure, and arcade games, and even Honkai: Star Rail itself.

Reviewers gave Silver Wolf's gameplay a positive reception. Marco Wutz of Sports Illustrated felt that her ability to alter enemy weaknesses made the game highly interesting. Jessica Orr of Eurogamer considered Silver Wolf best suited for applying debuffs to enemies and adding Weaknesses to them. Tilly Lawton of Pocket Tactics described Silver Wolf as a character capable of dealing large amounts of single-target damage, and said that her ability to apply debuffs and create weaknesses made her a valuable character. A 4Gamers reviewer praised Silver Wolf's utility as highly flexible and broad, allowing players who focus their resources on building mono-element teams to avoid worrying about being unable to deal damage when they lack the corresponding element. Jordan Lemons of Prima Games described this weakness-applying ability as one of the best parts of her gameplay, and Celine Jaeckel of EarlyGame agreed, saying it was the most useful aspect of her kit and praising her debuffing abilities.
