= Aventurine (Honkai: Star Rail) =

Video game character

- Honkai character
- Official artwork
- First game: Honkai: Star Rail (2023)
- Voiced by: English: Camden Sutkowski; Caitlyn Elizabeth (young); Chinese: Yang Chaoran; Pi Xiugang (young); Japanese: Kengo Kawanishi; Korean: Park Jun-won

In-universe information
- Full name: Kakavasha
- Home: Sigonia-IV
- Types: Imaginary, Quantum
- Paths: Elation (combat), Preservation

Aventurine (Chinese: 砂金; pinyin: Shājīn), real name Kakavasha (/ˌkəˈkɑːˌvəʃɑː/, 卡卡瓦夏; Kǎkǎwǎxià), is a character from the game Honkai: Star Rail, developed by miHoYo. In the game, he is one of the ten senior executives (or Ten Stonehearts) of the fictional organization known as the Interastral Peace Corporation (IPC). In the main storyline, he is tasked with reclaiming the IPC's control over the fictional planet Penacony. Over the course of the conflict, his cunning use of strategies allows him to manipulate the situation and secure leverage in negotiations, ultimately laying the groundwork for the IPC to seize corporate shares in Penacony. Aventurine appears both as a playable character and as an antagonistic leader within the story, and his gameplay mechanic of randomly "betting points" reflects his gambler-like personality. He was released in version 2.1 of the game in March 2024.

In 2026, an alternate playable version of Aventurine named Aventurine • Waveflair (砂金·戏浪; Shājīn: Xìlàng; 'Aventurine: Frolicking in the Waves') was released. Aventurine has received generally positive reviews from critics. Commentators have highlighted his gambler-themed characterization, the character development he displays throughout the story, and the philosophical reflections on existentialism and nihilism suggested by his narrative arc. The multi-line narrative structure used in the storyline surrounding Aventurine has also been praised. The character has likewise become popular among players, even leading aventurine gemstones themselves to become popular pieces of game-related merchandise.

== Combat and voice acting ==
In the game's main storyline, Aventurine appears as a boss character. To emphasize his gambler persona, and to increase the game's difficulty while encouraging players to think strategically, the developers introduced a mechanic similar to blinds in poker. During combat, Aventurine may randomly initiate a "point comparison" minigame with the player; the outcome determines the buffs or debuffs applied in battle depending on whether or not the player scores more points than Aventurine.

Aventurine is voiced in Chinese by Yang Chaoran, in English by Camden Sutkowski, in Japanese by Kengo Kawanishi, and in Korean by Park Jun-won.

== Appearances ==
=== Story ===
Aventurine was born with the name Kakavasha. As the sole survivor of a massacre on his home planet of Sigonia-IV and the last descendant of his clan, he survived through sheer resilience and ambition. As the last descendant of his clan, the hopes and blessings of his mother and sister compelled him to keep on living. Yet, he also struggled for a long time with doubts about the meaning of life, at times believing life might lack any meaning and even being willing to wager his own life. For years, he longed for death as a release from his tragic fate. Because he repeatedly managed to turn desperate situations around through seemingly "lucky" reversals, a slave owner took interest in him and enslaved him. The barcode on Aventurine's neck is the product number assigned to him as a slave. The slave owner forced slaves to kill each other for survival; Kakavasha endured and ultimately killed the slave owner himself. Later, he was arrested by the Interastral Peace Corporation (IPC) for defrauding the company. He was personally investigated by Jade, a senior executive in the IPC's Strategic Investment Department. Impressed by him, Jade arranged for his crimes to be pardoned and invited him to join the department. After undergoing a life-threatening trial, he rose to become one of its senior executives. The head of the Strategic Investment Department, codename Diamond, granted him a gemstone imbued with part of their (Diamond's) authority known as a Cornerstone, and bestowed upon him the codename Aventurine.

In the game's main storyline, Aventurine travels alongside IPC consultant Dr. Ratio to Penacony, a planet famous for its dreamscape and which had formerly been an IPC penal colony. Their mission is to reclaim the company's control over the planet. However, Sunday, Penacony's ruler, has already learned of Aventurine's intentions and refuses to allow anyone from the IPC to enter the dream world. To demonstrate goodwill and gain Sunday's permission, Aventurine is forced to surrender his luggage and Cornerstone to Sunday. Once inside the dreamscape, Aventurine and Dr. Ratio split up. Aventurine attempts to form alliances with other visitors but repeatedly meets resistance. Through these efforts, he learns that Robin, a popular Penaconian singer and member of the planet's leadership, harbors doubts about the current regime. After searching for her, Aventurine finds Robin, only to discover that she has died within the dream. With no other options, he approaches the Trailblazer, the game's main protagonist and, using the information about Robin's death as leverage, forms a temporary alliance with them.

Meanwhile, Dr. Ratio meets with Sunday according to Aventurine's plan. He expresses an intent to betray Aventurine and reveals that the latter has hidden two Cornerstones. Delighted by this information, Sunday requests a meeting with Aventurine. During the meeting, Aventurine attempts to retrieve his Cornerstone through smooth talk, but Sunday exposes his scheme using the information that Dr. Ratio provided him. Sunday humiliates Aventurine, restricts his movements with magic, and forces him to leave with his luggage. Despite this setback, Aventurine's plan proves superior. Sunday fails to realize that Aventurine had secretly hidden a third Cornerstone inside his luggage. Aventurine's apparent humiliation and Dr. Ratio's supposed betrayal were both distractions, allowing Aventurine to act using the third Cornerstone. He later learns that Penacony's leadership hides secrets in deeper layers of the dreamscape. Aventurine searches for a way to enter these deeper layers, hoping to use the hidden truths as leverage to force the planet's leadership to relinquish control. He targets Acheron, an Emanator of Nihility who is traveling with the Trailblazer's group. Using the power of his Cornerstone, Aventurine turns against the group and initiates combat, forcing Acheron to cut open the dreamscape and send him into the deeper layers of the dream. However, the Cornerstone is completely destroyed in the process. Aventurine eventually uncovers the secrets hidden within the deep dream and returns to reality. In the end, Aventurine's colleagues in the Strategic Investment Department recover the first two Cornerstones. Using the truths Aventurine exposed, they pressure Penacony's leadership into selling their shares of the planet, successfully allowing the IPC to regain control over it. Because Aventurine's Cornerstone was destroyed, Diamond convenes a meeting to discuss expelling him from the department. Ultimately, another executive repairs Aventurine's Cornerstone, and he is allowed to remain in the department.

=== Gameplay ===
Aventurine is a 5-star character on the Path of Preservation who deals Imaginary damage. (Note: In Honkai: Star Rail, a Path defines a character's combat role and design philosophy. Characters on the Path of Preservation typically have defensive roles in combat such as shielding and damage mitigation.) His Skill can grant shields to all allies. Aventurine's Basic Attack deals Imaginary damage as a percentage of his Defense stat to a single enemy. His ultimate randomly gains a stack of "Blind Bet", inflicts a status of "Unnerved" onto a single enemy, and inflicts Imaginary damage onto said enemy. When an ally attacks an Unnerved enemy, the critical damage dealt increases by 9%.

Aventurine • Waveflair is a 5-star Quantum-type character on the Path of Elation.

== Promotion ==
Aventurine first appeared in version 1.4 of the game on October 11, 2023, in the main story quest "Winter Dream's Awakening," where he was heard only as an off-screen voice. Prior to this, he had only appeared in the background story of a weapon called "Trend of the Universal Market." Aventurine later made his formal on-screen debut as a non-playable character in version 2.0 of the game, in the main story quest "A Raucuous and Tumultuous Affair." miHoYo released his official character illustration on January 24, 2024, formally announcing that he would become a playable character in version 2.1. In mid-April the company released trailers for both his character backstory and gameplay. They also released a signature Light Cone (weapon) for him titled "Destiny Has Never Been Fair." Outside the game, the Japanese magazines An An and PASH! published character features in April 2024 written in the style of an interview with Aventurine. A new playable version of Aventurine called "Aventurine • Waveflair" was released in version 4.5 of the game on September 12, 2026.

miHoYo collaborated with Japanese toy company Good Smile Company to launch a nendoroid plastic figure for Aventurine in April 2024. In that same month, they also collaborated with the eyewear brand Zoff to launch a series of co-branded eyewear for Aventurine, Kafka, Dan Heng and Acheron, and they further released merchandise for Aventurine, Sparkle, Dan Heng and March 7th in a collaboration with the store chain Lawson in Japan. They also launched a collaboration with China CITIC Bank in August to release debit card designs themed around Aventurine and fellow IPC executive Topaz. Also in August 2024, the nendoroid became available to order outside China. In November, an origami bird resembling Aventurine was launched as well.

== Reception ==
Aventurine has been warmly received by both players and critics. Fans have expressed their appreciation by cosplaying as him, creating fan art and other derivative works. Citing data from the analytics website Sensor Tower, Game Rant reported that in the month Aventurine was released as a playable character, Honkai: Star Rail generated US$109,000,000 in revenue. According to a report by Chinese Communist Party newspaper Jiefang Daily, the version 2.1 main storyline mentions that aventurine gemstones resemble jade in appearance but differ greatly in price. Inspired by this, some players began purchasing aventurine gemstones as game-related merchandise, causing the stones to become popular on online e-commerce platforms. Some sellers even labeled their products with the nickname "Little Peacock" (a nickname given to Aventurine by some players ingame) or included some of his quotes in product descriptions. Jiefang Daily praised the game's portrayal of Aventurine for stimulating consumer demand and giving aventurine gemstones additional cultural value. According to Siliconera, a group of Chinese fans even adopted a blue peacock at a zoo in Dalian and named it after the character to express admiration for him.

=== Characterization ===
Regarding Aventurine's character design, United Daily News commentator Xiluo wrote that although Aventurine was fairly handsome, the open front of his shirt felt somewhat "too deliberate" and did not quite align with mainstream expectations for male playable characters. Lian Po, a commentator for 3DM, likewise argued that Aventurine's visual design is intentionally unlikeable: his extravagant clothing, refined appearance, and bluish-purple eyes all fit players' stereotypical image of a spoiled aristocrat. His inscrutable personality and probing manner of speech and behavior convey a sense of slyness that can make players feel uneasy upon first encountering him.

Yan Ku of Yahoo News wrote that the game's multi-line storytelling structure helps flesh out Aventurine's character. Through first-person segments in the storyline told from Aventurine's point of view, players directly experience and understand his story. Game Rant critic Jackie Arias praised the main storyline's portrayal of Aventurine, stating that the game's exploration of his struggles and motivations adds greater depth to his character. While many players initially view him as a villain, she writes that experiencing the story often shifts their perception from suspicion to sympathy. Siliconera editor-in-chief Jenni Lada compared Aventurine with Acheron, arguing that although Aventurine is positioned as an antagonist he ultimately steals the spotlight, even overshadowing Acheron at times. She described his tragic history as a slave as moving, and said that his conspiratorial maneuvering against characters like Sunday creates tension. She also added that his interactions with Dr. Ratio add a comedic tone that breaks the earlier impression of him as a flat character.

The main storyline in version 2.0 of the game primarily depicts Aventurine's arrival in Penacony, his interactions with other characters, and his investigation into the dreamscape. Lian Po observed that in this portion of the story, Aventurine largely functions as an antagonist. As an IPC executive, he is introduced as a flamboyant, extravagant gambler with the demeanor of a spoiled aristocrat, a setup that makes him difficult to like at first. On one hand, Lian Po writes, Aventurine's darker side is clearly displayed in that he is able to lie without hesitation to enter Penacony or tear up agreements to gain leverage in negotiations. On the other hand, his repeated setbacks and humiliations, argues Lian Po, keep players engaged and curious as to how he will respond. The version 2.1 main storyline centers on the strategic clashes between Aventurine, Sunday, the Astral Express crew (the Trailblazer's group), and Acheron, while also revealing Aventurine's backstory through flashbacks. Yan Ku praised these story developments for reaching what she called an unprecedented emotional peak, and said they completely changed her view of Aventurine. She also praised his trust in his colleagues and how strongly that was portrayed, calling it moving.

=== Gameplay ===
Regarding gameplay design, Lian Po believes Aventurine's skill set reflects two of his defining traits — luck and preservation. His out-of-combat ability is presented as him operating a slot machine; it grants buff effects depending on the outcome. The animation for his ultimate shows him throwing dice on a roulette wheel and gaining "Blind Bet" points. Lian Po argues that these mechanics, which incorporate elements of randomness, strongly emphasize Aventurine's persona as a gambler and his reckless, risk-embracing personality.

In terms of gameplay experience, reviewers including Xu Ke of 4Gamers, the Yahoo Kimo (Taiwan) editorial team and Yan Ku all praised Aventurine for combining strong teamwide protection with the ability to prevent individual allies from being defeated, making him unusually powerful. The shields he provides are extremely strong; if enemies cannot deal enough damage, they are difficult to break. Xu Ke and Lam Cheuk-hang of HK01 also wrote that Aventurine serves as the final piece of the "follow-up attack" team archetype, while still remaining broadly useful in other team compositions. Yan Ku and Jenni Lada further praised Aventurine's offensive capabilities, writing that he can contribute substantial follow-up attack damage.
