= Planarcadia =

Fictional location in Honkai: Star Rail

- Honkai location
- Duomension City, Planarcadia's largest city and de facto capital
- Created by: miHoYo

In-universe information
- Type: Planet
- Ruled by: Pearl
- Races: Humans; Imagenae
- Characters: List
- Path: Elation

Planarcadia (Chinese: 二相乐园; pinyin: Èrxiàng Lèyuán; lit. 'two-phase paradise') is a fictional location in the video game Honkai: Star Rail, developed by miHoYo. It is a planet inspired by numerous elements of popular culture and Internet culture. It was first released in version 4.0 of the game on February 13, 2026, and was generally well received.

== Design ==
Planarcadia's setting is the most modern among the areas featured in the game, and it incorporates elements such as train platforms, sidewalks, traffic lights, cars and billboards. The area includes several built-in mini-games, such as side-scrolling platformers, tabletop games and spatial puzzles. The development team noted that the original world-building for Planarcadia did not originate from a desire to incorporate Internet memes; rather, it stemmed from an observation into how real-world social media, traffic and exposure mechanisms, and emotional expression are increasingly shaping modern communication and public spaces. As a result, the team's intent was to materialize the elusive atmosphere of online spaces into a tangible environment, letting players immerse themselves in the world.

The theme of elation, around which Planarcadia is centered, is dramatic and unpredictable rather than a simple happiness or playful attitude. From the beginning, the developers focused on not simply incorporating randomness and chaos into the area. They instead gave priority to a more fundamental sensation (specifically, shifts and reversals in rhythm) designed to elicit an involuntary smile from the player, while ensuring the game remained easy to play and intuitive.

The core worldview of Planarcadia is that attention is everything; in other words, amusing oneself to death. Its environmental design, non-player character interaction logic, and the way the protagonists advance the story are closely tied to modern concepts such as fandom. Consequently, the game initially positions Sparxie, the most popular online streamer in Planarcadia, as a primary antagonist. In an interview, the developers stated that creating Planarcadia was a long-term process, noting that they typically establish a world's fundamental premise, narrative direction, and overall atmosphere at an early stage. They stated that the decisions they make are "based on a comprehensive assessment of content pacing, production schedules, and experimental goals."

== Lore ==
=== Background ===
Planarcadia began as a real planet that was invaded by the antagonistic Antimatter Legion, led by the Lord Ravager Asat Pramad, a powerful servant of the Aeon of Destruction. A young artist named Graphia, whom he had actually raised as an adopted daughter, eventually turned against him after witnessing the Astral Express and its crew protecting her people. The Phantasmoon Games were celebrated, and are a competition held roughly every fifteen years in which eight contestants, known as Supplicants, compete to accumulate Wishpower from the public. The winner is promised an audience with Aha, the Aeon of Elation—one of the godlike beings who embody fundamental forces of the universe—and the temporary use of Aha's power. In one edition of the Phantasmoon Games, Graphia gathered an enormous amount of Wishpower (the energy generated by hopes, imagination and belief), and used it to encase the surviving civilization inside a gigantic two-dimensional painting called the World in Canvas. The painting became both a sanctuary and prison in that it protected Planarcadia from Asat Pramad and, importantly, sealed away the remains of the Aeon of Voracity, whose corpse lies at the heart of Planarcadia. Graphia herself became bound to the World in Canvas for approximately a thousand years before the game's events.

Modern Planarcadia exists because the Interastral Peace Corporation (IPC) eventually salvaged part of the painting and reconstructed it in the real world. Now, creatures known as imagenae are created from imagination and sustained by Wishpower. The IPC subsequently took control of Planarcadia, turning it into an economically important hub for entertainment and commerce. Even the planet's government and industries operate under the IPC. The Phantasmoon Games remain central on Planarcadia because they generate enormous amounts of Wishpower, although their old role as Planarcadia's political system was replaced by the IPC administration. Beneath this cheerful spectacle, however, Asat Pramad had been working toward reopening the World in Canvas and wreaking havoc.

=== Plot ===
The Astral Express, a train that travels between worlds, arrives at Planarcadia, the homeworld of its navigator Himeko, to resupply. The planet is preparing for the Phantasmoon Games. The Trailblazer, the game's protagonist, becomes caught up in the Games alongside a collection of competing factions and individuals. Among them are Sparkle, a mischievous member of the Masked Fools, a group devoted to Aha; Sparxie, an online streamer and an artificial being created from people's wishes; Pearl, an IPC executive; and several members of the Xianzhou Alliance, an interstellar civilization that has its own reasons for interfering. The situation becomes increasingly dangerous when Fulwish, a former student whose body has been altered by the power of Shuhu, an immensely powerful being associated with the Aeon of Abundance, attempts to use the Games to spread this power across Planarcadia. The Trailblazer defeats Fulwish, while Blade, an immortal warrior from the Stellaron Hunters, absorbs the remaining fragments of Shuhu's power into his own body.

The crisis then takes a much darker turn. The Games are eventually revealed to have a hidden purpose: the accumulated Wishpower has been keeping the remains of Oroboros, the Aeon of Voracity, dormant. Asat Pramad manipulates events to gain access to the sealed remains and unleash their destructive power. He transforms Planarcadia into an apocalyptic wasteland and abducts Himeko, forcing the Trailblazer and the Astral Express crew to confront him. Although the crew defeats Asat Pramad, his actions awaken the remains of Oroboros, threatening to destroy the entire planet. The Astral Express therefore evacuates Planarcadia's population while the survivors seek a way to contain the awakened threat. The solution is to restart the Phantasmoon Games and use Aha's power to seal Oroboros once again. The plan succeeds, saving Planarcadia, but the story ends with a major revelation: Nihilux, an apparently ordinary artist and friend of the Trailblazer who had accompanied the crew during their adventures on Planarcadia, reveals that she is actually Aha, the Aeon whose Games had driven the entire crisis.

== Promotion ==
HoYoverse collaborated with Hatsune Miku on multiple occasions during the Planarcadia update period. The official Hatsune Miku YouTube channel released three songs. On April 23, it released the song "HoYoHoYoにしてあげる♪" (transl. "I'll HoYoHoYo You"), a cover of the 2007 song "I'll MIKUMIKU You"; the music video features Hatsune Miku and the new character Silver Wolf LV.999, who debuted in version 4.2. Diana Velásquez Vargas of GameRant said that it was "arguably the gacha's biggest collaboration" since an earlier one with Fortnite involving Blade and Kafka. On April 26, a special version of the game's third-anniversary song "Side Quest King (KISAI remix)", performed by Hatsune Miku, was released. On September 4, a medley called "Summeretto Medley: Tell Your World × Only by Chasing the Wind" was released. The former is one of Hatsune Miku's signature songs from 2012, while the latter is a song released for the character Robin in version 4.5 and sung by Chevy.

== Reception and impact ==
MMORPG.com editor Steven Weber described Penacony as one of the most bizarre worlds in the game to date. Siliconera editor Jenni Lada expressed particular interest in a board game involving trash cans, comparing it to the minigame Genius Invokation TCG in Genshin Impact while noting that it incorporates more novel elements. GameSpot writer Cheri Faulkner characterized Planarcadia as charming and funny, and she described it as a big city "full of advanced technology". She praised the story as one of the game's easiest to follow, calling it a breath of fresh air. Sammy Barker of Push Square characterized its inspiration as largely inspired by anime, otaku culture and popular culture. They said the gameplay was "fantastic fun", praising the fact that exploration transitions from two-dimensional to three-dimensional. They liked the theme of Planarcadia, and described the planet itself as "the star of the show". In a pre-release review, Braden Czerwinski of Gaming Age described Planarcadia as a "fictional world come to life" and called the first impression fantastic. They praised exploration, in particular the "platforming segments that can either help you navigate across certain parts of the city or find chests within them". Kotomegu of Dengeki Online praised the mini-game segments, calling them "exhilarating and addictive". She and Barker both compared them to other video game franchises such as Super Mario.

Although miHoYo has not explicitly acknowledged it, evidence suggests that the content of Planarcadia was modified at the last minute due to political reasons prior to release. Before the changes, version 4.0 of the game had been set to introduce the region as "Benzaitengoku", a region inspired by Japan which was influenced by cyberpunk. On November 7, 2025, Japanese Prime Minister Sanae Takaichi made a statement in the National Diet that a Chinese attack on Taiwan could potentially constitute an "existential crisis for Japan" which would allow the country to take defensive military action. This caused a diplomatic crisis between the two countries. The Chinese government implemented a series of countermeasures against Japan, including a ban on Japanese culture. In late November, an insider revealed that the team was making changes to the map in response to this, which would result in the update being delayed. Players deemed it unlikely that HoYoverse would recreate the region's entire map in the remaining time, suggesting instead that modifications would be made to existing content. On December 5, 2025, it was announced that version 3.8 would have an abnormal duration of eight weeks rather than the standard six, and that version 4.0 would be released on February 13, 2026. On December 8, the developers issued a statement hinting that they were editing content related to Planarcadia, which stated their intention was to improve the experience for players. Nicolas Dixmier, an editor at Jeuxvideo.com, observed that while the architectural style of Planarcadia's maps that were available at launch were strongly reminiscent of Tokyo, with areas like Duomension City resembling Akihabara, Dovebrook District echoing Kabukichō, and Graphia Academy looking much like a Japanese high school. He said the location names no longer carried clear Japanese connotations, and indicated that some of its contents had become Westernized.
