= Robin (Honkai: Star Rail) =

Video game character

- Honkai character
- Official artwork of Robin
- First game: Honkai: Star Rail (2024)
- Voiced by: English: Alice Himora; Chevy (singing); Chinese: Qian Chen; Chevy (singing); Japanese: Kaori Nazuka; Chevy (singing); Korean: Shin Onyu; Chevy (singing)

In-universe information
- Species: Halovian
- Occupation: Singer
- Relatives: Sunday (brother)
- Home: Penacony
- Types: Physical; Wind (Summeretto)
- Paths: Harmony; Remembrance (Summeretto)

Robin (Chinese: 知更鸟; pinyin: Zhīgēngniǎo; lit. 'mockingbird') is a character from the video game Honkai: Star Rail, developed by miHoYo. In the game, she is a singer from the fictional planet of Penacony. She is a Halovian, an angel-like species with wings on their heads and a halo-like accessory. She was released in version 2.2 of the game on May 8, 2024.

In 2026, an alternate playable version of Robin called Robin • Summeretto (知更鸟·晴歌; Zhīgēngniǎo: Qínggē; 'Mockingbird: Sunny Song') was released. Robin was received warmly by players and critics, who applauded her for her cute appearance and inspiring message. There was a large amount of speculation as to whether or not Robin was alive after she was believed to be a murder victim. miHoYo also produced an EP for her which topped more than ten music charts. miHoYo launched a project to use Robin's music to raise awareness for hearing loss in December 2024.

== Design and voice acting ==
Robin's speaking voice is provided in English by Alice Himora, in Chinese by Qian Chen, in Japanese by Kaori Nazuka and in Korean by Shin Onyu. Her singing voice was provided by Chevy in all languages. Nazuka said in an interview that although Robin was beloved by her people, she was not content with that and wanted as many people as possible to feel happiness through her songs. She added that she was careful not to change the way Robin's attitude sounded when interacting with one character compared to the next, aiming to keep her behavior consistent except for when Robin was talking with Sunday. Nazuka added that Robin was very strong, but that she would not impose that strength on others. Because of this, she made sure to use words that came across as well-refined and gentle.

Regarding the relationship between her and Sunday, Nazuka thinks there is a fundamental difference between Robin and Sunday's understanding of freedom and protection. This was already reflected in their childhood discussion about the happiness of caged birds: Sunday believed that being loved in a safe environment was happiness, while Robin believed that birds should find happiness in free flight, even if they face the unknown. Despite the difference in their views, Robin still deeply loves her brother and she especially cherishes the childhood memory of singing on a cardboard box with Sunday. Nazuka thinks that deep in Robin's heart lies a contradiction in that she sings both for her fans and for her brother and that this complex emotion has become an invisible shackle binding her. In an interview with Famitsu, the development team stated that Sunday pursues a sort of happiness like an eternally shining lone star, while Robin rejects this and believes that the sky should be filled with countless stars and that Sunday does not have to bear his burden alone.

=== Music ===
miHoYo also released an EP of Robin's songs on May 9, 2024, called INSIDE (空气蛹; Kōngqì yǒng; 'air chrysalis'). The EP initially featured three songs, all sung by Chevy as Robin. On June 22, the fourth song, "Had I Not Seen The Sun", was also released. INSIDE topped more than ten music charts. An official documentary revealed that the game's composers sought inspiration from their imagination to create the music.

All tracks are written by HOYO-MiX.

No.	Title	Lyrics	Length
1.	"Sway to My Beat in Cosmos"	Robin, HOYO-MiX, Chevy	2:45
2.	"If I can Stop One Heart From Breaking"	Robin, HOYO-MiX, Chevy	3:22
3.	"Hope Is the Thing With Feathers"	Robin, HOYO-MiX, Chevy	3:50
4.	"Had I Not Seen The Sun"	Robin, HOYO-MiX, Chevy	2:25
5.	"Sway to My Beat in Cosmos (Instrumental)"		2:45
6.	"If I can Stop One Heart From Breaking (Instrumental)"		3:22
7.	"Hope Is the Thing With Feathers (Instrumental)"		3:50
8.	"Had I Not Seen The Sun (Instrumental)"		2:25
Total length:			24:44

In an interview with Famitsu, the development team discussed the creative concept behind the songs. Regarding "Hope Is the Thing With Feathers", the team explained that the song is intended to faithfully portray Robin's life journey. The song portrays her as a bird protected within a cage, lost and uncertain. However, she later broke free from her restraints and flew out from her comfortable nest, becoming a renowned singer. At the end of the Penacony storyline, after defeating Sunday alongside her friends, she resolves to take her brother's place in protecting Penacony, using the power of Harmony to spread her song to all things in the world. As for "Sway to My Beat in Cosmos", the team described it as an emotional and narrative continuation of "Hope Is the Thing With Feathers"; if the latter represents Robin breaking free from her shackles and exploring freedom, then the former depicts her having already embraced that freedom and bravely stepping onto an unknown journey.

== Appearances ==
=== Story ===
Robin and Sunday are Halovians, an ancient species somewhat similar to angels that used to worship Ena, the Aeon of Order, but who changed course after Ena was assimilated by Xipe, the Aeon of Harmony. This caused the Halovians to join the Family, Penacony's ruling party, instead. Aeons are godlike entities that represent a particular school of thought. Robin's childhood took place amidst a war on the planet Epsilon, although she was born in Penacony. When a disaster struck, her mother sacrificed herself to protect Robin and Sunday, leaving them to depend on each other. Her lifelong dream was to sing and she hoped to convey her wishes for others' happiness through music. Eventually, she and Sunday moved to the planet Penacony and were adopted by its Dreammaster, or ruler. Robin's career as a singer was not without its troubles; inaccurate media reports and gossip caused Robin immense distress, leading her to contemplate giving up her role as a singer, though she would ultimately continue singing. In her spare time, she dedicated herself to giving singing lessons to children who had been displaced by war. When the protagonist Trailblazer first meets Robin after landing on Penacony, she is standing by Sunday's side but is not very talkative; she only says a few words here. After she leaves, March 7th indicates that Robin's voice is not how she remembers it and that something is off. Later, when the Trailblazer falls into the planet's Dreamscape, they feel dizzy. Robin uses her Halovian powers, which she calls "harmonizing", to rectify the dizziness.

Later, the Trailblazer tries to enter the Dreamscape again, but finds Robin's body lying in the pool needed to enter the Dreamscape. Robin's body, which has an otherworldly purple slash across it, dissipates into nothingness. Later, the player sees Sunday confront "Robin" (who was really Sparkle in disguise) about the incident and he mentions that Robin is actually only spiritually dead, not physically. He said the same thing that had just happened to Robin would happen to everyone equally across Penacony. Aventurine appears to blame Acheron for the creation of the entity that supposedly killed Robin and Firefly, (Note: In reality, it was Gallagher who created it.) and later tells Sunday that he plans to use Robin's murder to his advantage so the Interastral Peace Corporation, of which he is an executive, can take control over Penacony. However, in a private conversation with Sunday, he reveals he did not blame Acheron at all. Eventually, Sunday accuses Gallagher of the murders, but Gallagher instead alleges that Sunday has betrayed the Harmony. The Trailblazer eventually reaches the inner layers of the Dreamscape, where they are taken to meet Robin, confirming that she was not actually dead. She explains the change in her voice as a result of interference by the Path of Order against the Path of Harmony, on which her power and voice rely.

Gallagher's accusation proves true when Sunday reveals that he has been following Ena the entire time, not Xipe. He is shown putting both Robin and Welt Yang in a deep sleep. It is discovered that Sunday planned to take Robin's place as the central star of the planet's biggest festival. He explains to the group that he believed the Family had led Penacony down the wrong path and vowed to use the Path of Order to fix it. A battle ensues, but Sunday is victorious. With the help of Black Swan, the group learns that they are still trapped in a fake reality and it is revealed that Sunday used the Stellaron to merge reality and the dream to trap Penacony in a shared illusion. A Stellaron is a mysterious yet dangerous object which can cause massive changes to civilizations an ecosystems. After breaking out of the illusion, the Trailblazer, Robin and friends decide to end the crisis for good by disrupting the shared dream and having Robin use her powers to wake people up emotionally. Another battle ensues, in which the Trailblazer and friends are victorious. Robin embraces Sunday as he falls after his defeat. Sunday becomes an outlaw, joining the Trailblazer and friends on future missions.

=== Gameplay ===
Robin is a five-star Physical damage dealer who walks the Path of Harmony. (Note: In Honkai: Star Rail, a Path defines a character's combat role and design philosophy. Characters on the Path of Harmony typically focus on applying buffs to allies.) She largely has a support function in battle, boosting the party's damage. Her Basic Attack deals Physical damage to a single enemy. Her Skill increases the damage dealt by all allies and lasts for a set amount of turns. Her ultimate causes her to enter a state known as Concerto. When activated, all other allies immediately take action and their Attack is increased depending on Robin's stats. In the Concerto state, Robin is immune to crowd control debuffs.

Robin • Summeretto is a five-star Wind damage dealer who walks the Path of Remembrance. Her Basic Attack deals Wind damage to an enemy. Her Skill summons a memosprite, an entity used by Remembrance characters in combat. Her ultimate advances an ally character's action in the turn order and restores energy for them.

== Promotion and release ==
Information about Robin was first released on March 12, 2024, when she was described as a renowned singer from the fictional planet of Penacony. Her appearance was also revealed on this day. Information about her gameplay was released on April 30. On May 3, miHoYo released her character introduction as well as a trailer called "If We Had Wings" detailing the backstories of Robin and her brother, Sunday. In the trailer, younger versions of the two are seen as Robin reassures a group of children while telling them a story. miHoYo released her combat trailer on May 7, called "Sway to My Beat", which pictured Robin walking through the streets of Penacony and introduced one of Robin's fictional songs. She first appeared in version 2.0 of the game as a non-player character, and was released as a playable character in version 2.2 of the game on May 8. A new playable version of Robin named "Robin • Summeretto" was released in version 4.5 of the game on August 26, 2026. On October 9, 2026, it was revealed that Robin and Kafka would be added as playable crossover characters in another miHoYo game, Zenless Zone Zero.

On April 29, 2024, an EasyCard collaboration card was made available for purchase in Taiwan which featured Robin. On October 25, 2024, miHoYo revealed on Weibo that they would collaborate with Chinese technology company Moondrop to produce earbuds which drew inspiration from Robin. The earbuds also played lines recorded by Robin's Chinese voice actress depending on what the user did with them. A writer for HK01 praised the earbuds, complimenting the passive noise cancellation, sound quality and comfort while wearing them. Good Smile Company announced a collaboration with miHoYo to release nendoroid figures of Sunday and Robin for pre-order on December 24, 2024. The toys would be available the following August at a cost of ¥7,500. In January 2026, toy producer ADK Emotions announced the release of an action figure for Robin that July. The figure came with built-in lighting. In September, vocaloid Hatsune Miku released a collaboration music video featuring Robin called "Only by Chasing the Wind".

== Reception and impact ==
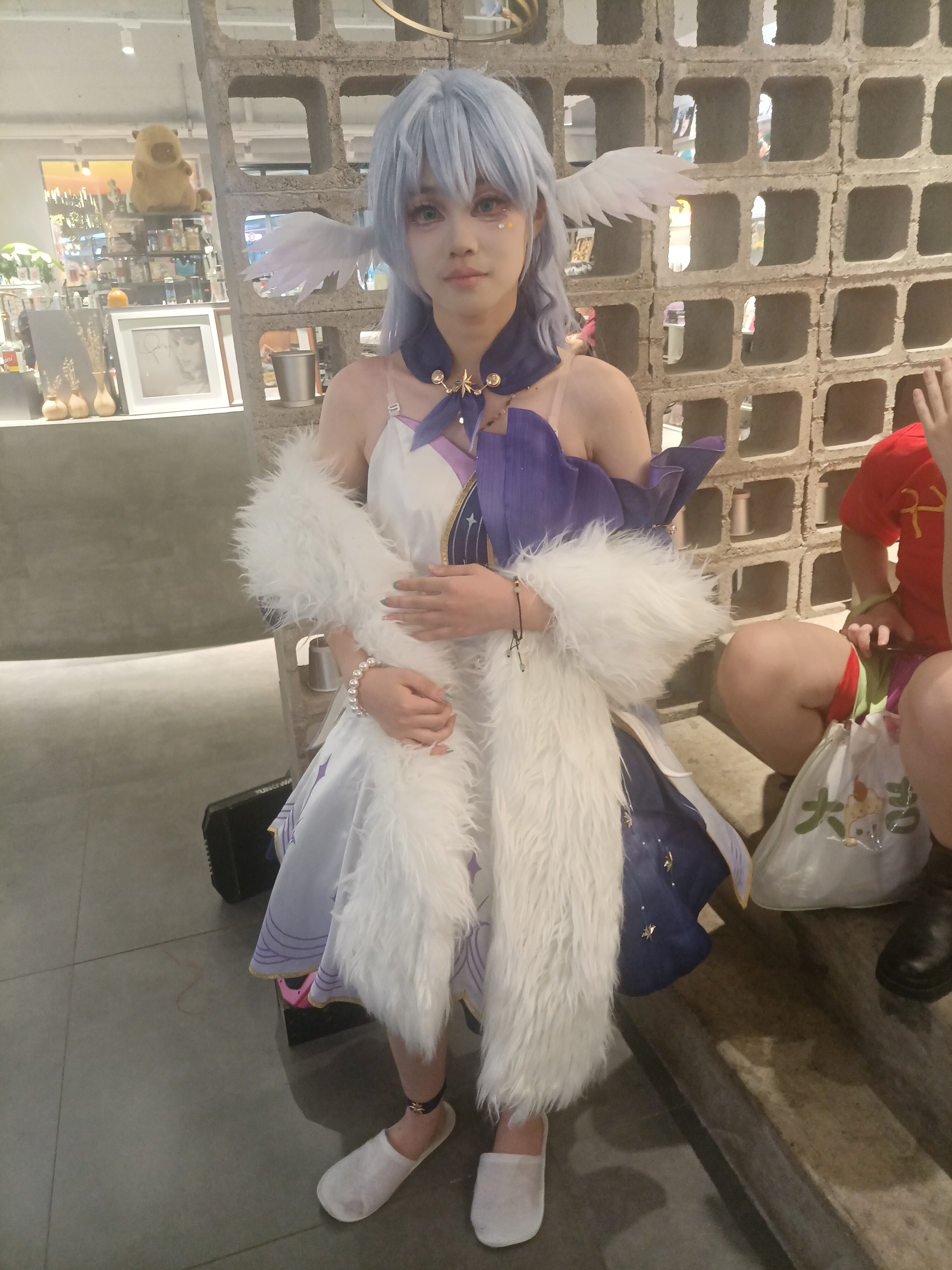
A cosplayer dressed as Robin

Robin has been received generally well by both players and critics. Fans have expressed their appreciation for the character by cosplaying as her. According to the China News Service, players have a positive opinion of Robin because of her glamorous status as an intergalactic celebrity, but also because her songs are intended to soothe pain and dispel the fear of the helpless, encouraging them.

Robin's appearance and characterization received praise from critics. The editorial department for Yahoo Games Taiwan characterized her as "graceful and poised" in a brief character announcement, and Celine Jaeckel of EarlyGame called her adorable and "oh-so-cute" and said that it was hard for her not to fall in love with Robin. Jaeckel also complimented her dress, hair, halo and eyes as attention-grabbing and described her as a very talented singer and idol. She wrote that "it just makes sense that the people in the game and we as players absolutely adore her."

Robin's music and trailers were also received positively. Hilo, writing for Taiwan's United Daily News, characterized Robin's image as "meticulously cultivated" and emphasized that miHoYo had hired a dedicated singer for the role in addition to her voice actresses, as well as producing several songs for her. Hilo complimented her combat trailer, "Sway to My Beat", for its camerawork, use of song, dance and production quality, writing that it was "more like a music video than a character trailer".

There was a great amount of speculation that Robin was not dead, despite appearing to have been killed during the Penacony Trailblaze Mission. Writer Yan Ku of Yahoo News said that reports about Robin's death in-game seemed to be exaggerated when miHoYo released her character art on March 12, 2024, to which Bruno Yonezawa of Screen Rant concurred, theorizing that Robin was only dead in the Dreamscape and was still alive in the waking world. Giovanna de Ita of The Nerd Stash speculated as well that Robin was still alive and that Shaoji, the game's narrative designer, had been attempting to convey that she was dead. De Ita still believed, as did Yonezawa and Ku, that Robin was alive because her drip marketing had been released. Ku stated that Robin was spiritually dead during the Trailblaze Mission, but that she thought that Robin may as well have been actually dead. She speculated that the spiritual death may be related to a boss known in-game as "Something Unto Death", which has a special attack that sets its target's hit points to zero. She added that while Robin and Firefly's bodies were physically intact and that their "deaths" in Penacony's Dreamscape prevented their consciousnesses from returning to reality. She theorized that defeating "Something Unto Death" would free them. Jaeckel expressed that she was not sure what had killed Robin as it had not been revealed at the time of publication, but she questioned why Sunday had been acting as if Robin had died for real; if someone dies in the Dreamscape, the expectation was that they would wake up in reality unharmed. She speculated that Robin may have had a similar disease such as Firefly's Entropy Loss Syndrome, which she argued could have explained Robin's vocal issues.

Rodrigo Brincalepe Salvador, writing for the Journal of Geek Studies, analyzed the symbolism of the bird that appears in Robin's splash art. He mentioned that viewers would expect the bird to be a robin and named various birds such as the European, Japanese and American robins as well as the red-flanked bluetail as examples of what he might have expected. However, he instead said he was confused by the fact that the bird miHoYo chose for her splash art was a bluebird, which is not a robin. He speculated that the reason for this choice may have been because Penacony is based on the Roaring Twenties-era United States and that miHoYo may have wanted to use a North American species of robin. He offered an alternative explanation which stated that the reason had to do with cuteness instead, or that it could have been due to a lack of information on the part of the developers.

=== Disability advocacy ===
On December 3, 2024, the United Nations' International Day of Persons with Disabilities, miHoYo launched a project centered on Robin which used her popularity to raise awareness for people with hearing loss. Their music team, HOYO-MiX, collaborated with Tencent's Tianqin Lab to adapt Robin's songs into low-frequency versions for the hearing impaired, which allowed them to listen to the music at a frequency they could hear. Tianqin Lab accomplished this by using technologies such as artificial intelligence, music separation and understanding, as well as music signal feature extraction and analysis to create the specialized audio tracks. They also analyzed hearing loss curves to generate a low-frequency audio track, according to the China News Service.

miHoYo also filmed a public welfare documentary, in which hearing-impaired children sang "Hope Is the Thing With Feathers". In the documentary, one of the developers argued that by leveraging Robin's influence, the company hoped to raise awareness about hearing-related disabilities. On October 30, miHoYo donated CN¥ 1,000,000 to the China Hearing Medicine Charity Foundation to establish a public welfare project dedicated to donating hearing aids to disadvantaged hearing-impaired children. Zhen Lixia, the foundation's executive deputy secretary general, said that the project focuses on assisting and supporting the hearing-impaired community in China, conducting hearing screenings for hearing-impaired children or teenagers from disadvantaged families and donating hearing aids. She said that public welfare platforms and games have a common feature in that they can connect people and resources.
