= Sunday (Honkai: Star Rail) =

- Honkai character
- Official artwork of Sunday
- First game: Honkai: Star Rail (2024)
- Voiced by: English: Griffin Puatu; Amber Lee Connors (young); Chinese: Xu Xiang; Japanese: Takeo Ōtsuka; Korean: Kang Seong-woo

In-universe information
- Species: Halovian
- Weapon: Magic
- Relatives: Robin (sister)
- Origin: Penacony
- Type: Imaginary
- Combat Path: Harmony

Sunday (Chinese: 星期日; pinyin: Xīngqīrì) is a character from the video game Honkai: Star Rail, developed by miHoYo. He is a Halovian, an angel-like species with wings on his head and a halo-like accessory near his head. In the lore, Sunday is one of the major organizers of a festival on the planet Penacony, and represents that planet's ruling faction, the Family. He is said to be a Harmony Pathstrider, but in the story he betrays the Harmony, instead choosing to walk on the Path of the Order instead. The game's protagonist, the Trailblazer, and friends combat Sunday, after which he joins them on future adventures.

Sunday first appeared as a playable character in version 2.7 of the game in December 2024. He was generally well received by critics, and he was commonly associated with symbols and ideas related to Christianity.

== Background ==
Sunday is an organizer of the Charmony Festival in Penacony, and represents the Family, Penacony's ruling party in making decisions. He has been described as vibrant by some, but the developers characterize him instead as a "pitiful seeker of paradise".

Sunday is voiced by Griffin Puatu in English, Xu Xiang in Chinese, Takeo Ōtsuka in Japanese, and Kang Seong-woo in Korean.

== Appearances ==
Robin and Sunday are siblings as well as Halovians, an ancient species somewhat similar to angels that used to worship Ena, the Aeon of Order, but who changed course after Ena was assimilated by Xipe, the Aeon of Harmony. This caused the Halovians to join the Family instead. When a disaster struck during a war, her mother sacrificed herself to protect Robin and Sunday, leaving them to depend on each other. Robin's lifelong dream was to sing, and she hoped to convey her wishes for others' happiness through music. Eventually, she and Sunday moved to the planet Penacony and were adopted by its Dreammaster, or ruler. When the protagonist Trailblazer first meets Robin after landing on Penacony, she is standing by Sunday's side but speaks little. Based on the few words she does speak, after she leaves March 7th indicates that Robin's voice is not how she remembers it, and that something is off. Later, when the Trailblazer falls into the planet's Dreamscape, they feel dizzy, which causes Robin to use her Halovian powers to rectify that, calling the ability "harmonizing".

Later, the Trailblazer tries to enter the Dreamscape again, but finds Robin's body lying in the pool needed to enter the Dreamscape. There is an otherworldly purple slash across her body, which dissipates into nothingness. Later, the player sees Sunday confront "Robin" (who was really Sparkle in disguise) about the incident, and he mentions that Robin is actually only spiritually dead, not physically. He said this would happen to everyone equally across Penacony. Aventurine appears to blame Acheron for the creation of the entity that supposedly killed Robin and Firefly, (Note: In reality, it was Gallagher who created it.) and later tells Sunday that he plans to use Robin's murder to his advantage so the Interastral Peace Corporation, of which he is an executive, can take control over Penacony. However, in a private conversation with Sunday, he reveals he did not blame Acheron at all. Eventually, Sunday accuses Gallagher of the murders, but Gallagher instead accuses Sunday of betraying the Harmony instead. The Trailblazer eventually reaches the inner layers of the dreamscape, where they are taken to meet Robin, confirming that she was not actually dead. She explains the change in her voice as a result of interference by the Path of Order against the Path of Harmony, on which her power and voice rely.

Gallagher's accusation proves true when Sunday reveals that he has been following Ena the entire time, not Xipe. He is shown putting both Robin and Welt Yang in a deep sleep. It is discovered that Sunday planned to take Robin's place as the central star of the planet's Charmony Festival, and he explains to the group that he believed the Family had led Penacony down the wrong path, and vowed to use the Path of Order to fix it. A battle ensues, but Sunday is victorious. With the help of Black Swan, the group learns that they are still trapped in a fake reality, and it is revealed that Sunday used the Stellaron to merge reality and the dream together to trap Penacony in a shared illusion. After breaking out of the illusion, the Trailblazer, Robin and friends decide to end the crisis for good by disrupting the shared dream and having Robin use her powers to wake people up emotionally. Another battle ensues, in which the Trailblazer and friends are victorious. Robin embraces Sunday as he falls after his defeat. Sunday becomes an outlaw, initially joining the Astral Express crew on future missions as a passenger until their adventure in Planarcadia, where Himeko officially invites him to join the crew as a Nameless.

=== Gameplay ===
Sunday is a 5-star rarity character who walks the Path of the Harmony in gameplay. (Note: In Honkai: Star Rail, a Path defines a character's combat role and design philosophy. Characters on the Path of Harmony typically focus on applying buffs to allies.) His Basic Attack deals Imaginary damage to a single enemy. His Skill enables a designated ally character to take action immediately, and increases their damage dealt. His ultimate causes him to regenerate Energy for one designated character and causes that character to enter a state known as "The Beatified". After using his skill on this character, Sunday recovers a Skill Point, which can be used by other characters. Characters in the aforementioned state have their Crit Damage stat increased. The state lasts for three turns, and counts down every time Sunday takes his turn; when the counter reaches zero, or if Sunday is downed in combat, the state ends. Sunday was also released in the form of a boss which can be fought weekly.

== Promotion ==
Sunday made his first appearance in a livestream in December 2023, where his appearance and basic lore were revealed. More detailed information about Sunday was first released on May 3, 2024, when miHoYo released a trailer called "If We Had Wings" detailing the backstories of him and Robin. In the trailer, younger versions of the two are seen as an adult Robin reassures a group of children while telling them a story. On October 8, 2024, miHoYo released his character introduction, revealing his appearance and hinting at his affiliation with the Path of Order as well as his rarity and damage type. On November 26, 2024, they published a video explaining Sunday's combat capabilities. On December 2, 2024, miHoYo released a character promotional video for him named "Soloist", demonstrating his personality. Sunday became playable in version 2.7 of the game on December 4, 2024.

In October 2024, miHoYo and Good Smile Company announced they were collaborating to release Nendoroid figures of Robin and Sunday, with pre-orders accepted between December 24, 2024, and February 12, 2025, and shipping scheduled for the following August. Sunday's figure came with several changeable facial expressions: a neutral one, one with an open-mouth smile which Siliconera editor Jenni Lada described as sinister, and an angry one. It also came with accessories of ravens, a window sheet, and one of the game's enemies. More Nendoroids were released in May 2026; Sunday's could be dressed in cloth clothing. Additionally, Myethos Gift released a figure of Sunday modeled after his appearance in the promotional material for a series of live concerts featuring the game's music. In said material, he is seen wearing a tuxedo and gloves and holding a conductor's baton. Takeshi Nishiwaki of AUTOMATON said of the figure that the baton gave off the impression that Sunday "held the melody of the entire universe in his hands." The figure was scheduled for release in November 2026.

== Reception ==
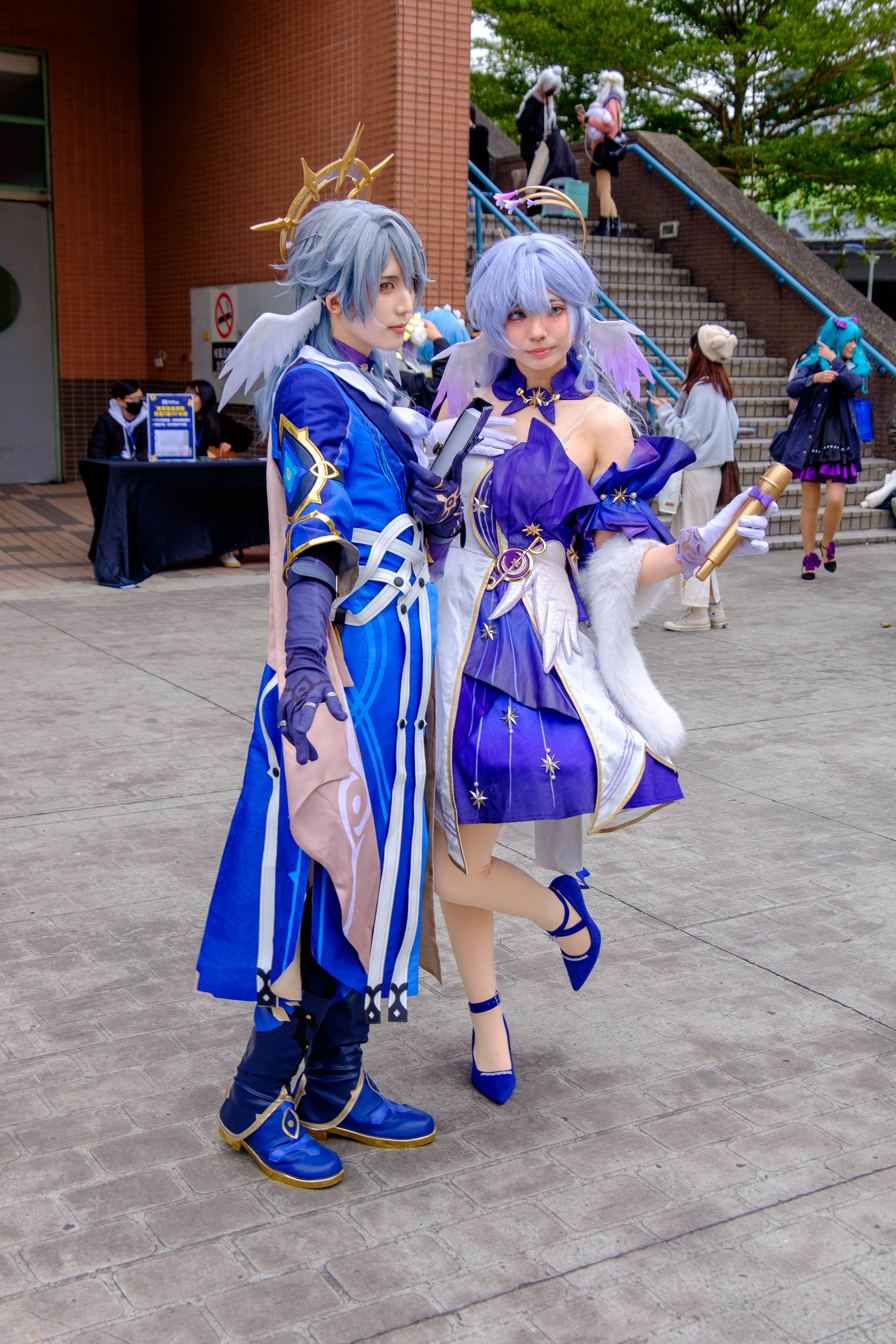
Cosplays of Sunday (left) and Robin (right)

Sunday was received generally well, with fans celebrating his release as a playable character with fan art and cosplay. Polygon writer Ana Diaz said that his splash art looked "stunning" and that it brought out a "godlike, celestial side" to him. She described the fan's patience as them waiting with bated breath for him to be playable, writing that some even lost hope when a quest took the Trailblazer away from Penacony before Sunday's release. Fans were also happy that Sunday would finally be able to reunite with his sister in teams after they were separated in the story.

The promotional video for Sunday, "Soloist", was criticized by some for plagiarism. The official account for Onmyoji, a game published by NetEase Games, indirectly called out miHoYo for plagiarizing the trailer for the character Jinkougyou with a post of the character Tsukiyomi warning them against "any rash actions," Liu wrote. She analyzed the trailers and observed that there were several similarities in terms of the shots that were used, indicating that a scene involving lights ascending in "Soloist" used a similar type of composition to the lighting used in Jinkougyou's trailer, but also said that many on the Internet defended this as a reference to Neon Genesis Evangelion. Other users indicated that a scene involving a piano is similar to a trailer for Identity V, another NetEase game. Hideaki Fujiwara of AUTOMATON also added that a scene involving a statue submerged in water closely resembled the opening scene for Tsukiyomi's promotional video. Liu further compared the incident to a prior one involving the trailer for Sparkle, which was seen by some as plagiarizing the music video for the song "marenol" by Japanese musician LeaF. At the time, LeaF indicated that they believed the trailer to be an homage to their work, since it was not an exact replica of their work; NetEase and the Onmyoji developers, says Liu, did not appear to take the same approach. Fujiwara added that some people online argued that "Soloist" went beyond paying homage and was in fact plagiarism of Onmyoji. On December 4, NetEase posted on social media that their legal department was investigating the case. After several users reported the issue to the official Onmyoji Weibo account, the account "explained that the game has pursued the beauty of its characters and has been committed to a unique design aesthetic and a high level of perfection in its world view", wrote Fujiwara. He characterized the incident as an expression of the commitment to Onmyoji's design and one of hope to the development of the video game industry, adding that he thought it would be interesting to see what happened next.

Hannia Arevalo of the Cornell Daily Sun analyzed Sunday through a religious lens, focusing on the motifs in his antagonist arc and his relation to sociopolitical infrastructure in the United States. She compared some of Sunday's lines to Biblical scriptures, namely some in the books of Revelation and Psalms. Sunday's arc, she says, parallels the Book of Joshua, as Sunday sees sacrificing Penacony's people as a necessary act of violence to align the planet with the Order, similar to Joshua and his conquest of the Promised Land. She argued that Sunday's story warns that when religion is exploited to justify political power or cruelty, it can turn leaders into false prophets who weaponize scripture for their own agendas. She added that although Sunday is fictional, his political motives were similar to three ideas present in modern American society: divine retribution, the Promised Land, and violence. Christian nationalism, like Sunday's pursuit of Order, has the potential to distort apocalyptic beliefs into support for authoritarianism by treating religion and scripture as justification for violence, colonialism and power rather than moral guidance. She said that beneath Penacony's dreamlike religious imagery and entertainment, Sunday serves as a warning against the lack of separation of church and state, especially when Christian nationalism and authoritarian politics meet.

Rin Shinonome of Real Sound examined one of Sunday's quotes, where he explored the idea of a "seven-day weekend", as well as his motifs. She characterized "harmony" as people supporting one another, while "order" was about a leader controlling everything. She theorized that Sunday's principles of action reflect this kind of thinking. Sunday, she says, is a person whose spirit is philanthropic in nature and that therefore his actions are "based on a distorted principle." She characterized him as altruistic and devoted, yet self-righteous. She argued that Sunday's advocating for a seven-day weekend reflected Penacony's Jazz Age inspiration, and that it used the economics, hedonism, and pop-culture nostalgia of the Roaring Twenties to frame an idealized world of endless leisure. She said that term "Jazz Age" refers to the social climate of the 1920s in the United States, a time of economic prosperity. The Jazz Age was a post-World War I time of mass production and rapid growth in jazz, youth culture and entertainment across the country. The economic boom, she says, gave Americans more disposable income, encouraging more spending on entertainment, risky speculation and widespread optimism. Sunday's motto reflects the Family's desire to preserve Penacony's prosperity forever, rejecting the collapse and instability symbolized by the likes of Black Thursday (the start of the Wall Street crash of 1929) and the end of the Jazz Age. Shinonome went further, speculating about Sunday's future role in the story after Penacony. At the time of writing her analysis, Sunday had been defeated in the main story, but his fate was unclear, leaving room for future plot development. She correctly speculated that he would become playable in the future.

Similar to Arevalo, Shinonome saw symbolism of Christianity in Sunday. She said he was rooted in Christian symbolism, referencing the idea of Sunday being a day of rest, his boss title "Dies Domini", choir imagery, references to walking in the light, and attacks similar to those seen in the Bible and in the stories about the German legendary character Faust. She said his boss visuals may reference Michelangelo's painting, The Creation of Adam, but with the imagery reversed to support Sunday's belief that humans create gods rather than the inverse. She added that because resurrection is a major theme in Christianity, she believes that Sunday's religious motifs may foreshadow his own reappearance later in the story. She connected the Christian idea of resurrection after three days to in-game text about idleness running from Friday until Monday, as well as descriptions of Sunday's boss form containing a sleeping newborn god. She said that these clues suggest That he may be metaphorically moving beyond his dream of an “eternal Sunday” toward “Monday,” representing a return to reality and change. She speculated that a future storyline focused on Sunday's "Monday" could be the natural movement for him to return to the story and become playable, believing he would remain serious but show a more humorous side now that Penacony was no longer in crisis, and potentially appearing in events with Robin. She ended by saying that if Sunday were to become playable, his Path would be especially significant because he belongs to a Harmony-affiliated organization while personally following Order, leaving his future direction unresolved.
