= Himeko =

Video game character

- Honkai character
- Official artwork of the latest Himeko iteration as she appears in Honkai: Star Rail
- First game: Guns Girl Z (2015)
- Voiced by: EN: Cia Court; ZH: Lin Su; JA: Rie Tanaka; KO: Kim Bo-na

In-universe information
- Full name: Murata Himeko
- Weapon: Greatsword
- Relatives: Ryusuke (father; deceased)
- Origin: Far East (GGZ, HI3); Planarcadia (HSR)
- Types: Biologic, Mecha, Psychic (HI3); Fire (HSR)
- Paths: Erudition (combat); Trailblaze (lore)

Murata Himeko (Chinese: 無量塔姫子; pinyin: Wúliàngtǎ Jīzǐ) is a character from the Honkai video game series developed by miHoYo. The character originally appeared in Guns Girl Z as the commander of a squad dedicated to fighting a supernatural destructive force called the Honkai. The character has since appeared as distinct iterations in the two subsequent games in the series, Honkai Impact 3rd and Honkai: Star Rail. In the former game, she is the daughter of a brilliant scientist who became a warrior and teacher after her father's death, training students to fight the Honkai. She later sacrificed herself to save the game's protagonist, Kiana Kaslana, from being controlled by the Herrscher of the Void, dying in the process. In the latter game, she rebuilds the Astral Express train after it crashes on her home planet of Planarcadia. Afterwards, she became the train's navigator and leader, helping to guide its crew through major conflicts across the universe.

As of 2026, multiple playable forms for Himeko have been released across Honkai Impact 3rd and Honkai: Star Rail. Himeko was generally received well, and the lore and stories between the Honkai Impact 3rd and Honkai: Star Rail iterations were generally compared. However, Himeko's gameplay in Honkai: Star Rail was generally criticized for her poor damage output.

== Design and voice acting ==
Himeko first appeared as a boss character in version 1.8 of Guns Girl Z, also known as Houkai Gakuen 2, in 2015. Before her first in-game appearances in Honkai Impact 3rd and Honkai: Star Rail, she debuted in the manhua Escape from Nagazora and was teased through a cameo appearance in the manhua Alien Space, respectively. In version 1.1 of Honkai Impact 3rd, Himeko was released as a playable character, or Valkyrie, in 2016, alongside two battlesuits: Battle Storm and Scarlet Fusion. Since her release in the game, Himeko has received six playable battlesuits, the latest of which, Vermilion Knight: Eclipse (真红骑士·月蚀; Zhēnhóng Qíshì: Yuèshí; 'Crimson Knight: Lunar Eclipse'), was released in 2018. miHoYo first revealed that an iteration of Himeko would appear in Honkai: Star Rail upon the release of the game's first trailer on October 7, 2021, although they first revealed information about the Himeko which appears in Honkai: Star Rail on April 10, 2023, where she appeared in a trailer which showed her combat abilities. On May 19, 2026, miHoYo revealed that this Himeko would receive a new form called Himeko • Nova (姬子·启行; Jīzǐ: Qǐxíng; 'Himeko: Star-Bound Journey'). Himeko • Nova was released on July 15, 2026.

All Himeko iterations are voiced in Chinese by Lin Su and in Japanese by Rie Tanaka. Honkai Impact 3rd does not offer English or Korean voice-overs, but in Honkai: Star Rail she is voiced by Cia Court and Kim Bo-na, respectively, in those languages.

== Appearances ==
=== Guns Girl Z ===
In the Retrospective Chapter, Murata Himeko encounters the game's protagonists, Kiana Kaslana, Raiden Mei, and Bronya Zaychik, after they board Hyperion, the flying battleship under her command. Himeko mistakes the trio for infiltrators from Anti-Entropy, an organization opposed to Schicksal, the anti-Honkai organization she serves. Theresa Apocalypse, the head of Schicksal, clears the misunderstanding after recognizing Kiana's voice, and the trio is recruited into St. Freya High School. Sometime later, Bronya is briefly manipulated by Anti-Entropy and attempts to destroy Hyperion's reactor. Himeko and Theresa lead the academy's defense against an Anti-Entropy assault. During the battle, Himeko rams Hyperion into the enemy battleship Moonlight Throne, allowing Kiana, Mei, and Bronya to infiltrate it and disable its power core. When Moonlight Throne later crashes into the academy's church, Himeko and Theresa search the wreckage for the missing Kiana. During the search, Himeko learns that the academy was built atop the remains of the Second Herrscher. A Herrscher is a human influenced by the destructive supernatural force known as the Honkai. She also learns that Schicksal had secretly studied Herrscher power to counter future threats. After Kiana is revealed to have fused with the Second Herrscher's core and triggered a Final Eruption, she transforms and acts under the Herrscher's will. She turns on her former allies and kills Himeko, Theresa, and Seele Vollerei, one of Bronya's fellow orphans. Kiana ultimately destroys all life, ending the timeline. The world is subsequently reset into a new cycle, whose events are depicted in the Reborn Chapter.

In the Reborn Chapter, Himeko reappears when she rescues Raiden Mei during a Schicksal operation against an Anti-Entropy facility. She introduces herself as a Schicksal Valkyrie (Note: In Guns Girl Z and Honkai Impact 3rd, Valkyries are female warriors trained to fight the Honkai.) and instructor at St. Freya. She takes Mei under Schicksal's protection and trains her alongside fellow students Kiana Kaslana and Houraiji Kyuushou. Their time at St. Freya is disrupted when Welt (no relation to Welt Yang), the leader of Anti-Entropy who is posing as Kiana's father Siegfried Kaslana, reveals that the real Siegfried had died years earlier. Welt then attempts to forcibly transform Kiana into a Herrscher. Kiana's Herrscher powers awaken, creating a massive rift known as the Subspace Fault. As St. Freya collapses, Himeko attempts to evacuate the students and witnesses Kiana's mother, Cecilia Schariac, sacrifice herself to suppress Kiana's rampage and seal the rift. After St. Freya's destruction, Himeko, Theresa Apocalypse, and the surviving students form a rogue faction. Learning of Schicksal archbishop Otto Apocalypse's human experiments and plans disillusions Himeko, prompting her and Theresa to permanently break away from Schicksal during the organization's collapse. They later rebuild a defensive force while protecting civilians and rogue Valkyries. During the final battle against the Will of Honkai, the mastermind behind the Honkai, Himeko and fellow Valkyrie Mushoku Kika pilot a battleship and activate the Nexus System. The weapon is powered by Herrscher energy and consumes its user's life force. Although severely injured, their sacrifice contributes to humanity's victory. Himeko survives, recovers from the Nexus System's effects, retires from active duty, and later lives peacefully in the post-Honkai era while remaining close to Theresa.

=== Honkai Impact 3rd ===
==== Story ====
Official artwork of Himeko as she appears in Honkai Impact 3rd (Battle Storm battlesuit pictured)

Murata Himeko was born in the Far East in 1987 to a scientist named Ryusuke and an unnamed mother, and by age fifteen she graduated high school as valedictorian and presented a paper at a conference. Interested in exploring the stars, Himeko enrolled at the California Institute of Technology's Aerospace and Space Engineering Program, studying under teachers such as Welt Yang. She was also interested in aliens, having traveled to New Mexico to investigate a sighting of one. Tragedy struck her in 2005, when her closeness to Welt and her father made her an unsuspecting target for the forces they were fighting against, and she was nearly killed by them and knocked unconscious. After she woke up, she was told that her father had died and that Welt had disappeared. Wanting answers, she earned her PhD and joined Schicksal, the anti-Honkai organization Welt worked with, to investigate her father's death. She underwent grueling training and was accepted into an assault squad at 19 years old. In 2010, an incident occurred that led to the destruction of the Assault Squad, with Himeko being the only survivor. She joined St. Freya High School afterwards as a teacher to the game's protagonists, Kiana Kaslana, Raiden Mei and Bronya Zaychik, and instructs them on fighting the Honkai.

She promised to bring Raiden Mei control her power as a Herrscher. Later, when Kiana was kidnapped and taken to Schicksal, Himeko led a mission to rescue her. Guided by Fu Hua, St. Freya's class monitor, Himeko took up the prototype battlesuit Vermilion Knight: Eclipse, donning it to gain the strength needed to confront Sirin, the Herrscher of the Void, inside an imaginary space. Himeko defeated Sirin, saving Kiana from being controlled by her in the process. However, Himeko was gravely injured in battle, and died. Eventually, Earth is threatened with an alien invasion. Welt and Void Archives, an entity formed from a group of sentient weapons, infiltrate one of the alien ships, which eventually leads to them being stranded in outer space and finding out that the Sky People, an ancient civilization that destroys worlds, are targeting the Himeko from Honkai: Star Rail. Welt thus was brought into the alternate universe of Honkai: Star Rail so he could save her.

==== Gameplay ====
Himeko has six different playable battlesuits: Battle Storm, Valkyrie Triumph, Scarlet Fusion, Blood Rose, Arctic Kriegsmesser, and Vermilion Knight: Eclipse. She uses a greatsword in battle.

Battle Storm is a B-rank Biologic-type battlesuit that allows Himeko to accumulate up to three stacks of energy before unleashing it in a powerful attack, with her ultimate allowing her to spin her greatsword in a wide, sweeping motion that strikes multiple enemies at once. Valkyrie Triumph is an A-rank Biologic-type battlesuit that centers on the ultimate "Blade Field", which immobilizes all enemies within its area of effect, allowing Himeko to charge a powerful greatsword strike. The battlesuit also grants her shield-breaking capabilities. Scarlet Fusion is an A-rank Mecha-type battlesuit that draws on nuclear fusion as its primary source of offense, dealing high-damage Lightning attacks capable of paralyzing enemies. Blood Rose is an S-rank Psychic-type battlesuit that specializes in dealing Fire damage, igniting enemies through her ultimate's explosion and through an evasion-triggered counterattack. While her ultimate gradually drains her own health, she becomes stronger as her health decreases, making the battlesuit unexpectedly resilient in combat. Kriegsmesser is an A-rank Psychic-type battlesuit awakened from Battle Storm that specializes in manipulating Ice, performing well under freezing and slowing effects. It accumulates a resource called Threshold through basic attacks and evasion, and its battle performance is significantly enhanced once Threshold Mode is activated. Vermilion Knight: Eclipse is an S-rank Mecha-type battlesuit that combines Physical and Fire damage through a high volume of rapid attacks while maintaining mobility in combat.

=== Honkai: Star Rail ===
==== Story ====
Himeko was born on the planet of Planarcadia. When she was young, she attended at Graphia Academy. She later found the Astral Express train having crash landed on Planarcadia, and helped to rebuild it. Eventually, she met Welt, Dan Heng, March 7th and the game's protagonist the Trailblazer, all of whom became passengers on the train once it became operational again. Himeko serves as the train's navigator and de facto leader. On the planet of Penacony, Himeko helps interpret a strange invitation to a festival and eventually helps guide the group in a fight against the planet's leader, Sunday. After the Express is asked to look into Amphoreus, a mysterious and isolated world threatened by a Lord Ravager called Irontomb, she leads the group into combat against it and helps form a cosmic alliance against the Destruction.

After solving the crisis on Amphoreus, the Astral Express heads to Planarcadia. There, it is revealed that Himeko was a past participant (or Supplicant) in the Phantasmoon Games, the winner of which receives the power of Aha, the Aeon of Elation, temporarily. In that edition of the games, several people were murdered, and it became known as the Bloodstained Games. She also meets with her father, Ryusuke, who is eventually revealed to be Asat Pramad, a Lord Ravager, in disguise; the real Ryusuke had been murdered prior to the game's events.

Asat Pramad further reveals that Himeko was accompanied by an imagenae named Motoko, a non-human being made of wishpower, who Asat believed to have assumed the identity of the real Himeko after she died from a hereditary curse. However, it is later revealed that after the Bloodstained Games concluded, Motoko was approached by Aha's shadow within the Phantasmoon, who granted her wish to exchange her fate with Himeko's by inheriting the curse herself. Motoko subsequently fades away, allowing Himeko to be cured and eventually become the Astral Express's navigator.

==== Gameplay ====
Himeko is a 5-star Fire character who walks the Path of the Erudition. (Note: In Honkai: Star Rail's lore, Paths are manifestations of universal philosophical concepts. A person is considered to be "on" a Path when their will overlaps with the characteristics of that Path. For example, characters on the Path of Remembrance often have something to do with memory. Only certain Paths are available for use in combat; characters who use other Paths in the lore are assigned alternative Paths that they use in combat instead. In combat, a Path defines a character's combat role and design philosophy. Characters on the Path of Erudition are known for their not-insignificant amount of damage, and for applying said damage equally between enemies. They are exceptional at defeating groups of enemies.) Her Basic Attack deals Fire damage to a single enemy target, and her Skill deals increased Fire damage to one target and a lesser amount of Fire damage to adjacent targets. Her ultimate deals Fire damage to all enemies and regenerates a certain amount of energy per enemy. If an enemy's Weakness is broken, she gains a stack of Charge, the maximum of which is set at 3. When Charge is full, after an ally attacks, she consumes all stacks of Charge and deals Fire damage to all enemies. Her Technique consists of a satellite creating a burning zone which lasts for a set amount of time. Upon starting combat in the burning zone, enemies take increased damage from Fire attacks for two turns.

Official splash art for Himeko • Nova in Honkai: Star Rail

Himeko • Nova, like regular Himeko, is a 5-star Fire character who walks the Path of the Erudition. Her Basic Attack, like regular Himeko's, deals Fire damage to one enemy. Her Skill causes her to regain all uses of her Assist Skill, which increases the damage dealt by all allies by ten percent. Her Talent causes a weapon called a Starblazer to appear on the battlefield and attack enemies; allies can use the Assist Skill to command it to do so. Her ultimate deals area-of-effect Fire damage to enemies.

== Reception ==
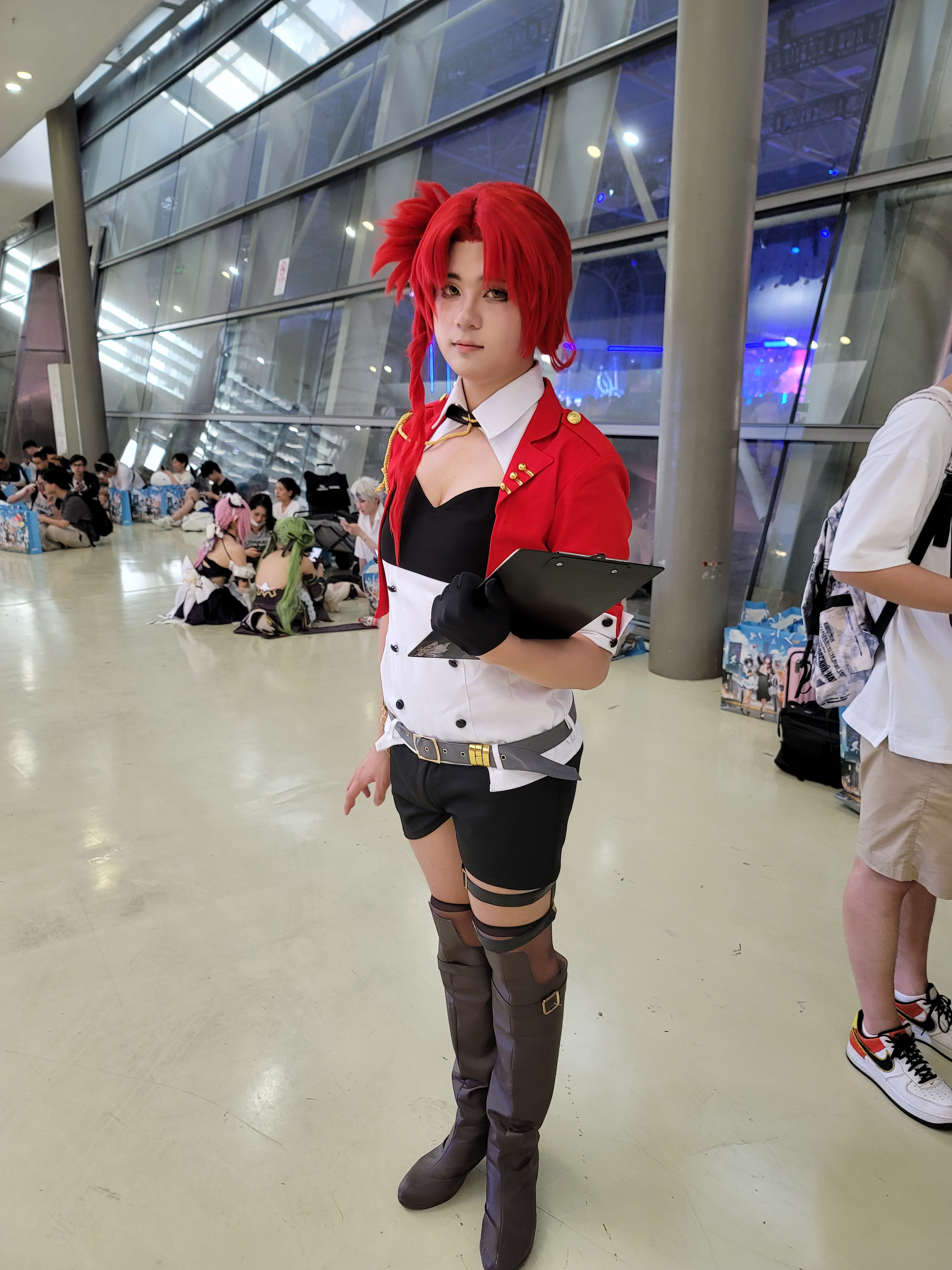
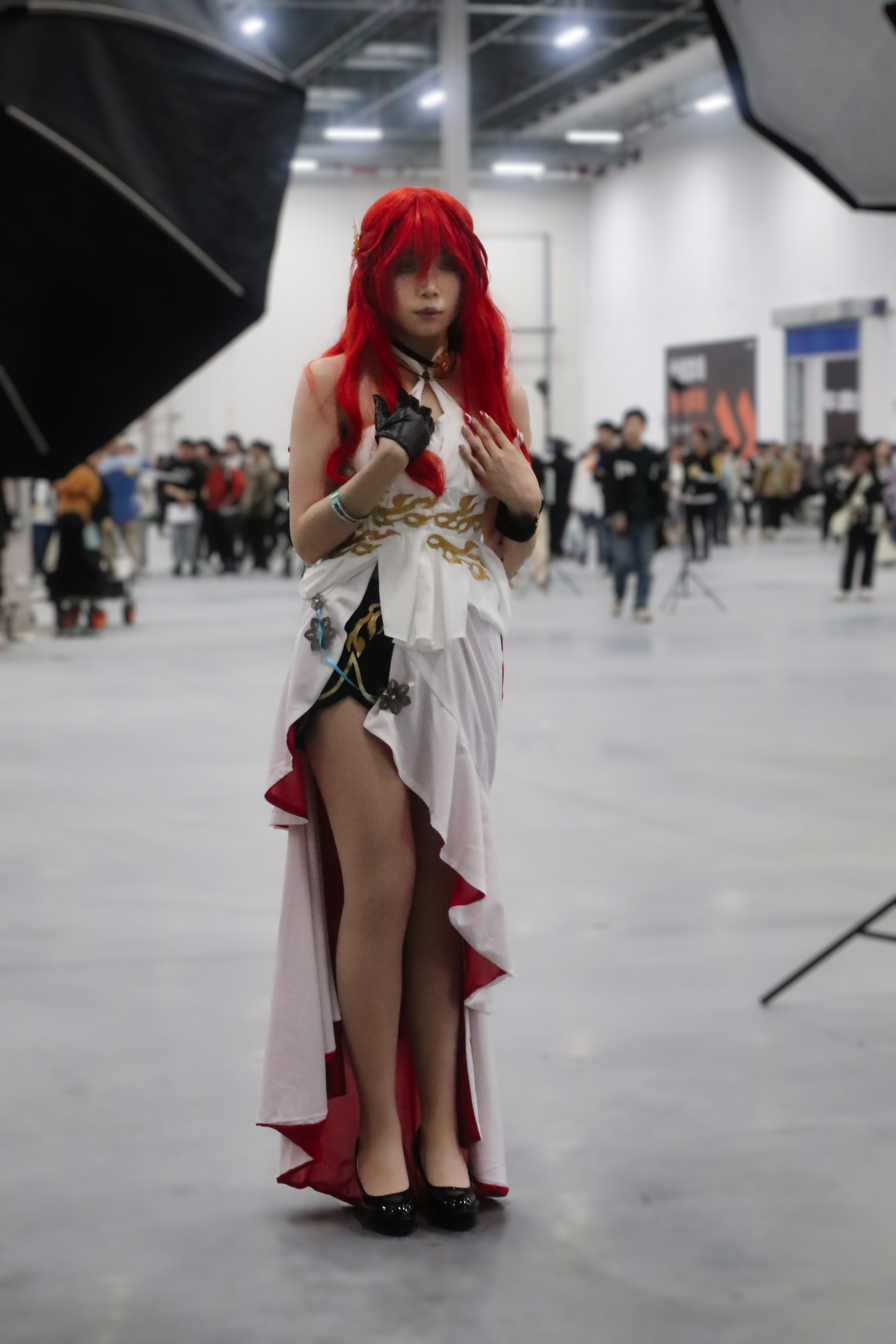
Cosplays of Himeko as she appears in Honkai Impact 3rd (left) and Honkai: Star Rail (right)

The Honkai Impact 3rd and Honkai: Star Rail iterations of Himeko were received generally positively by fans, some of whom showed their love for the character via cosplay.

Several critics have discussed Himeko in relation to both Honkai Impact 3rd and Honkai: Star Rail. Celine Jaeckel of EarlyGame contrasted the two iterations of the character by describing the Himeko from Honkai Impact 3rd as a brave but at times reckless fighter who "never backed down when the lives of others [were] at stake". She argued that HoYoverse "did Himeko dirty" in Star Rail by presenting a version which lacked the same combative edge as the previous game. The Himeko from Star Rail, however, was praised by Jaeckel, who said that people were not complaining about her physical appearance. Willa Rowe of Inverse analyzed Himeko's imagery in comparison to that of another character from Star Rail, Kafka, by indicating that it connects to broader motifs of fate and possibility; Kafka's trailer has rose petals falling throughout it, and Kafka's imagery involves threads which allude to the threads of destiny, while Himeko states that she is interested in pulling the threads of possibility apart. Daz Skubich of Pocket Tactics, however, framed the character's development more positively, describing Himeko • Nova as the result of bringing Himeko back to her home planet, the site of her past trauma, after more than ten years away. He said Himeko • Nova was still recognizable as the Himeko with whom the Trailblazer had been traveling, but that there were some other aspects to Himeko • Nova that were new; he said that the tips of her hair "now show the vastness of space, and she wears a starry headpiece", but added that the dress worn by the Star Rail iteration of Himeko, which he described as "signature", was still present.

Commentators have also discussed Himeko's story and lore. One article written by Rowe suggested that Himeko and Kafka may be concealing a prior relationship, and possibly a romantic one, based on the dialogue between the two, which Rowe characterized as teasing and tense. Rowe also indicated that fans have interpreted the pair as potentially exes, and pointed to Himeko's unusual trust in Kafka as supporting evidence: when the Trailblazer tells Himeko they plan to meet Kafka, Himeko says they will be safe with her despite Kafka's status as a wanted criminal, which Rowe described as a strange level of trust to have in someone Himeko supposedly barely knew.

Himeko's reception in Honkai: Star Rail was also shaped by the legacy of her Honkai Impact 3rd counterpart. After Honkai Impact 3rd introduced the Imaginary attribute, its story took an unexpected turn that appeared to confirm Himeko's death after "Final Lesson", which caught players off-guard: in "The Theater of Domination", the puppet army controlled by the Herrscher of Domination attacks Kiana psychologically by invoking Himeko's death, while the later recovery of the Gem of Haste from Himeko's "Vermilion Knight: Eclipse" battlesuit further suggested that she had died after falling in combat in order to save her. However, later discussion around "Set Tomorrow Ablaze" noted that only the Gem of Haste had been found, not Himeko's body, leaving a possibility that Himeko may not actually be dead, and that she may still return, perhaps in connection with the Herrscher of Flame. Writers and fans debated several possibilities: either the Herrscher of Domination was lying about Himeko's death in order to break Kiana emotionally, that Himeko's body could remain as a Herrscher while the original Himeko remained dead, or that Himeko was truly dead and that Kiana would inherit her will, power, or gem. This unresolved emotional legacy affected reactions to the iteration of Himeko in Star Rail: Jaeckel observed that because Himeko had been a fan favorite in Honkai Impact 3rd, many players were excited by the news of her return in Honkai: Star Rail, while Yan Ku of Yahoo News described Himeko's reappearance in Star Rail as joyful even though she was not the same Himeko that players were familiar with. Writer Raddie Perez of TheGamer agreed that fans were overjoyed at seeing Himeko's return, echoing Ku's point. Jess Reyes, in a theory surrounding Welt which argued that the two games shared the same universe, noted the fact that the two Himekos share a name and appearance, and called the Himeko from Honkai Impact 3rd a "beloved mentor figure". Pocket Tactics writer Holly Alice wrote that fans expected the Genshin Impact character Mavuika to be another expy of Himeko, saying Mavuika looked similar to the Honkai Impact 3rd Himeko's Vermilion Knight: Eclipse battlesuit.

The gameplay of the Himeko from Honkai: Star Rail was mostly received negatively. Jaeckel compared her Star Rail gameplay to Honkai Impact 3rd, saying that she "went from being a badass fighter to a coffee-drinking meme", referencing the Star Rail iteration's love for coffee. This, she said, caused many players to become overjoyed upon receiving Himeko, only to be met with disappointment and frustration due to her low amount of damage. Jaeckel added that "when you purely rely on her, she will let you down" and that "this is not the reckless fighter we fell in love with years ago". Connor Makar of VG247 also criticized her gameplay in Star Rail, describing her as the game's worst five-star character. However, he also praised her ability to defeat enemies in Pure Fiction, a then-new endgame mode which consists of rotating modifiers that affect combat. The week it was released, Pure Fiction's modifier was that every time an ally used their ultimate to attack enemies, it applied a stack of Shatter, which deals damage when an enemy's turn starts. He said that the enemies' Weaknesses were easy to break, which triggers Himeko's passive talent, in turn increasing energy and allowing the player to use characters' ultimates more. He said that Himeko highlighted a crucial strength to having several different endgame modes; different game modes that require constantly-changing team builds was rewarding, and such a game mode allows players who were new or who did not own a lot of characters a chance to succeed in battle.
