= PASH! =

Japanese anime magazine

- Editor-in-Chief: Ikuo Tonozuka
- Categories: Anime
- Frequency: Monthly
- First issue: 2004
- Company: Shufu-to-Seikatsu-sha
- Country: Japan
- Language: Japanese

PASH! is a Japanese anime magazine published by Shufu-to-Seikatsusha. It has been described as the first magazine in the industry to specialize in anime aimed at women, and has been described by Kadokawa Corporation as a "pioneer of anime magazines".

== History ==
In 2004, PASH! began publishing irregularly as the first anime magazine aimed at women. The impetus for its creation was that the wife of its publisher became a fan of Fullmetal Alchemist. At the time there were no anime magazines specifically aimed at women in Japan, and the magazines that featured Fullmetal Alchemist only contained information aimed at male fans, such as mecha and pretty girls, and lacked content that would be of interest to many female fans. After hearing his wife's complaints, Shufu-to-Seikatsusha editor Ikuo Tonozuka conducted his own market research and learned that there were many female fans of anime, so he decided to launch PASH! and become its editor-in-chief. The magazine's name comes from the English word "passion", and expresses how fans are engrossed in their favorite works and characters. The cover of the first volume featured Fullmetal Alchemist.

Subsequently, in April 2007 it was decided that PASH! would become a bimonthly magazine, and it was officially launched as such then. A major cause for this was that the sales representatives had been receiving requests from clients during business negotiations that PASH! should be made into a regular magazine, and they had reported this in internal meetings. Although sales were initially sluggish, they increased after a feature on Mobile Suit Gundam SEED Destiny, encouraging Tonozuka. The first mook, a feature on the baseball manga Big Windup!, went into a second printing. It also became the first magazine in Japan to specifically conduct interviews with male voice actors. They primarily targeted readers in their twenties and thirties.

It was upgraded to a monthly magazine in June 2012. At the same time, the position of editor-in-chief went from Tonozuka to Haruna Mamoru. The August 2013 issue featuring Attack on Titan on its cover sold out in a few days, resulting in a reprint, which was unusual for an anime magazine at the time. Initially, there were few anime aimed specifically at women, so female readers found elements from other anime that they are interested in. But as the number of female anime fans increased, the number of anime aimed at women likewise increased, and PASH! was able to continue publication for a long period of time despite several crises that threatened to suspend publication.

A digital version was launched in 2016, the first of its kind for an anime magazine. That year, PASH! experienced several reprints and sellouts, and it exceeded 81,000 copies sold that year, more than double the usual. One issue in December which had Yuri on Ice on the front cover sold out within six days of going on sale.

On February 4, 2023, Shufu-to-Seikatsusha announced plans to launch a new label called PASH! Bunko and enter the light novel paperback market, starting with the publication of Kuma Kuma Kuma Bear in February. With the launch of this new paperback label, they aimed to expand their reach to include teenagers and other demographics. Bookstores responded positively to the announcement, saying that the lower price point of light novels may help attract customers. The Kuma Kuma Kuma Bear series sold 2.8 million copies across light novels and manga combined. Real Sound wrote that the publisher appeared poised to strengthen its presence in the light novel market, and novel critic Ryuichi Takaguchi indicated that PASH! Bunko was becoming a significant part of the company. Takaguchi argued that the success helped push the company into a highly competitive paperback market.

They have also ventured into anime-style video game material, such as for Genshin Impact and Honkai: Star Rail. They have also included interviews with figures in the industry, such as voice actors and game developers.
