= Firefly (Honkai: Star Rail) =

Video game character

- Honkai character
- First game: Honkai: Star Rail (2024)
- Voiced by: English: Analesa Fisher (Firefly); Adin Rudd (SAM); Chinese: Song Yuanyuan (Firefly); Gan Ziqi (SAM); Japanese: Tomori Kusunoki (Firefly); Jun Kasama (SAM); Korean: Yu Hye-ji (Firefly); Jang Seo-hwa (SAM)

In-universe information
- Alias: SAM
- Weapon: Mechanized battle armor
- Origin: Republic of Glamoth
- Type: Fire
- Paths: Destruction (combat); Propagation, Finality (lore)

Firefly (Chinese: 流萤; pinyin: Liúyíng) is a fictional character from Honkai: Star Rail, a 2023 turn-based role-playing gacha game developed and published by miHoYo. She is a member of the in-game fictional organization known as the Stellaron Hunters, operating under the alias SAM (萨姆; Sàmǔ), (Note: Short for Fyrefly Type-IV Strategic Assault Mech (火萤Ⅳ型战略强袭装甲; Huǒyíng Sì-Xíng Zhànlüè Qiángxí Zhuāngjiǎ; 'Firefly IV Strategic Assault Armor').) and often appears in a mechanized armor form. In the story, Firefly dies three times on the dream planet of Penacony, forming a deep bond with the protagonist, the Trailblazer, in the process. Firefly became playable in version 2.3 in 2024.

Firefly's mecha-magical girl concept and girl-next-door fashion style have received positive critical reception. Reviewers have praised her portrayal in the game's narrative for its emotional impact and dramatic tension.

== Game overview and voice acting ==
Honkai: Star Rail follows the gameplay style of classic Japanese role-playing games where players build up a lineup of characters and control a team of up to four in turn-based combat. In addition to various stats that affect characters' strength, each character has a combat type that affects the kind of damage dealt to targets, a character class referred to as a Path that defines their combat role, and a set of unique abilities called Traces used in combat. Each character can equip a weapon known as a Light Cone, that has various effects which activate if the Paths of both the character and the Light Cone match. Characters can also equip various Relics, objects which improve a character's statistics in combat.

Firefly is voiced in Japanese by Tomori Kusunoki and in English by Analesa Fisher. Like the character, both Kusunoki and Fisher have chronic illnesses; Kusunoki has been diagnosed with the arthrochalasia type of Ehlers–Danlos syndrome, while Fisher has juvenile idiopathic arthritis. In an interview, Kusunoki said that she deeply empathized with Firefly and admired her lovable personality, inner resilience, and strong sense of mission. During recording, she chose to use a fragile tone while incorporating an innocent, bright quality; her first recording session took a long time, and she continued refining the performance afterward. Firefly is voiced in Chinese by Song Yuanyuan, and in Korean by Yu Hye-ji. SAM is voiced in Chinese by Gan Ziqi, in English by Adin Rudd, in Japanese by Jun Kasama, and in Korean by Jang Seo-hwa.

== Appearances ==
=== Story ===
Official portrait of SAM, Firefly's mechanized armor

Firefly is a genetically engineered soldier from the fallen Republic of Glamoth, an interstellar civilization that created her as a weapon against the Swarm, an alien enemy force in Honkai: Star Rail. In her human form, Firefly is depicted as a young girl. As SAM, Firefly changes into a mechanical form and can switch between her normal human form and her mechanical form in-game, being one of only a few characters who can switch between forms during battle. Before the events of the game, she underwent genetic enhancement, which left her with Entropy Loss Syndrome, a degenerative condition that causes her body to break down and gradually weakens her sense of reality. After Glamoth and the Swarm destroyed one another, Firefly was left as one of the few surviving remnants of her civilization. She later joined the Stellaron Hunters, a group of fugitives working to prevent a predicted universal catastrophe, and she now often operates under the armored identity "SAM".

Firefly is introduced during the Penacony storyline, which takes place on a resort planet built around a shared dream world. Because she is wanted as a Stellaron Hunter, she hides her identity and appears in her human form while secretly entering Penacony's Dreamscape. She first meets the Trailblazer, the game's protagonist, after being caught as an illegal stowaway and asking them for help. After escaping, she claims to be a local and offers to guide the Trailblazer around Penacony as thanks. As they explore together, the Trailblazer begins to suspect that Firefly is hiding something. A disguised Sparkle, member of the Masked Fools faction, warns the Trailblazer that Firefly has been lying about being from Penacony. Firefly later admits that she is a stowaway and tells the Trailblazer about Entropy Loss Syndrome. Soon afterward, Sparkle traps the two in a dangerous dream, forcing them to fight their way out with help from Black Swan. When the group later returns to the Dreamscape to find Firefly, she is attacked and apparently killed, dying in the Trailblazer's arms.

Firefly later reappears during a battle, revealing that she survived and that her true identity is SAM. She explains that her apparent death allowed her to reach a hidden, deeper layer of Penacony's dream world. She brings the Trailblazer there, where they reunite with the Astral Express crew, the game's main protagonist group. The group discovers that Penacony's dream world is close to collapse and confronts Sunday, the planet's leader, who plans to trap its people in an eternal dream. After the group is defeated and pulled into Sunday's dream, Firefly escapes by killing herself inside the dream, allowing her to return to reality and help the others understand how to stop him. The group ultimately defeats Sunday and ends his control over Penacony's dream world. In the storyline's conclusion, the singer Robin hosts a celebratory banquet aboard an airship. Sparkle falsely claims to have planted bombs on board, prompting the characters to search for them. Firefly carries the supposed bombs into the sky using her SAM armor, only to discover that they are fireworks. The scene ends with Firefly and the Trailblazer flying together amid the fireworks display.

A later storyline expands on Firefly's role in Penacony's history. The Trailblazer learns that their memories of the incident had been altered at the Stellaron Hunters' request. These restored memories reveal that Firefly had previously confronted the Dreammaster, Penacony's former ruler, after he attempted to exploit the Swarm and strengthen the power behind Sunday's dream. During these events, Firefly's illness worsens because of the temporary merging of dreams and reality. As she begins to fade from the Dreamscape, the Trailblazer uses the power of Finality to turn back time long enough for her to witness the fireworks, fulfilling one of her personal wishes. Firefly is later confirmed to have awakened safely in the real world, with the story hinting at a future reunion between her and the Trailblazer.

=== Character gameplay ===
Firefly is a 5-star (high-rarity) character who deals Fire damage in combat. She follows the Path of Destruction, a gameplay class generally focused on dealing damage while withstanding danger. In Honkai: Star Rail, a Path defines a character's combat role and design philosophy. Characters on this Path are typically main DPSes. Outside of battle, she can use a special ability called a Technique, which allows her to transform into her SAM form, leap into the air, and move freely while airborne. This ability also lets her perform a plunging attack that damages enemies in an area. In combat, Firefly fights entirely in her SAM form. Her ultimate ability, or strongest special attack, allows SAM to enter an enhanced state that greatly increases her offensive power.

== Promotion and release ==
Firefly's character illustration was first revealed on December 15, 2023, during a promotional livestream for version 1.6 of Honkai: Star Rail. She made her first appearance as a non-player character in version 2.0 of the game on February 6, 2024. On April 23, HoYoverse released her official character artwork, and on June 10, they released a trailer which revealed information about her past in the Glamoth military. On June 17, they released trailers for her character story and gameplay, as well as an animated short featuring her called The Embers of Glamoth. Firefly became a playable character in version 2.3 of the game on June 21, 2024. HoYoverse also introduced her signature Light Cone (or weapon), 'Whereabouts Should Dreams Rest', on that date. In version 3.4 in 2025, a purchasable skin was released for Firefly.

In early June 2024, HoYoverse ran a physical advertisement campaign featuring Firefly in certain Japan Railways train stations. An action figure based on SAM was released in a partnership between miHoYo and Bandai Spirits in June 2024. A video game controller for PC based on Firefly was announced on July 5, 2024. In 2025, miHoYo and Good Smile Company partnered to release a decorative figure for Firefly, which is scheduled to release in the fourth quarter of 2026 in Japan and the second quarter of 2027 elsewhere. A Firefly-themed computer case with accessories was announced in a partnership between miHoYo and HYTE in August 2025.

== Reception ==
Firefly was well-received by critics and players alike. Players created large amounts of fan art, commissioned illustrations from artists, and produced other fan works to express their affection for her. On the day of her release, Honkai: Star Rail reached the top of the iOS best-selling list in China, as well as leading app revenue charts in Japan and South Korea. A Bilibili user collated data on character-related videos posted to the platform between April 2023 and October 2025, ranking Firefly as the most popular Honkai: Star Rail character in the dataset.

Gamersky commentator Guan Feng said that Firefly's design was somewhat simple compared to other characters but that the "girl-next-door" first impression made her more approachable and narrowed the distance between her and the Trailblazer. Guan also wrote that the later reveal of her identity as SAM created a striking contrast in her character. She also observed that Honkai: Star Rail frequently conceals character information in promotional materials, encouraging players to combine details from trailers with in-game clues. According to Guan, this process gradually strengthens players' impressions of and emotional attachment to a character, increasing the impact of developments such as Firefly's apparent death and the revelation of her identity.

Critics also discussed Firefly's role in Penacony's storyline. Guan described her first interaction with the Trailblazer as resembling a date and wrote that Firefly's tour of Penacony establishes an early emotional bond between the two characters, saying it lays the groundwork for a deeper and more layered character arc. Yahoo News commentator Yan Ku compared the emotional fluctuations of the story to a roller coaster and described the presentation of Firefly's story as immersive and emotional. Ku was particularly affected when the narrative returned to the secret base associated with Firefly's earlier outing with the Trailblazer, and she described the revelation of Firefly's identity as highly dramatic. Discussing the scene where Firefly sacrifices herself to defuse the bomb, Guan wrote that Firefly displayed resilience and fragility at the same time. Guan also interpreted Firefly's name as an allusion to a moth flying into a flame and identified tragedy, death, and fate as recurring elements of her characterization.

Firefly's apparent death prompted strong reactions from players. At an event in Tainan, Taiwan, some attendees created a mock memorial for her near an official HoYoverse gashapon machine, displaying a black-and-white portrait, incense, joss paper, and offerings. After it was confirmed that Firefly had survived, anticipation quickly grew for her to become a playable character.
