= Penacony =

Fictional planet in Honkai: Star Rail

- Honkai location
- Golden Hour, a city within Penacony's dream world
- Created by: miHoYo
- Based on: United States during the Jazz Age

In-universe information
- Type: Planet
- Ruled by: The Family
- Races: Humans; Halovians; Pepeshi; Intellitrons
- Characters: List
- Path: Harmony

Penacony (/ˈpɛnəkoʊni/ PEN-a-cone-y; Chinese: 匹诺康尼; pinyin: Pǐnuòkāngní) is a location in the video game Honkai: Star Rail, developed by miHoYo. In the game, it is an entertainment district where visitors enter a lavish dream world upon falling asleep. Penacony draws heavily from the American Jazz Age, incorporating imagery, music, and architecture associated with the 1920s United States. Penacony is a portmanteau of the words penal and colony, reflecting the planet's original purpose as a prison world.

Critical reception to the Penacony story arc was largely positive, with commentators praising it for its suspense, cast of characters, and surreal dreamscape design, which combined Jazz Age aesthetics, puzzles, and commentary on culture. Penacony was released on February 6, 2024.

== Development and design ==
In the game, Penacony is described as a major entertainment district that is heavily based on the idea of dreams. It takes inspiration from the Jazz Age and Roaring Twenties periods in the history of the United States. The developers indicated that they originally considered giving the region a Victorian or steampunk theme, but switched to the Jazz Age because the prosperity, entertainment, and culture of the era better fit the idea of a "dreamland". Penacony's background music consists of jazz.

Penacony was designed around the concept of entering a dream. Within the game's setting, Penacony exists physically as a hotel suspended in space, while guests who fall asleep entering its rooms enter a large, lavish dream city. Penacony's exploration mechanics use the dream setting to disregard the ordinary laws of physics, including the ability to walk on walls and instantly traverse between rooftops that are not connected to each other via various gameplay mechanics. One such ability lets players change the direction of gravity, turning walls into floors and allowing exploration and combat across differently oriented surfaces. Another uses forced perspective, requiring players to rotate parts of the environment so that otherwise-disconnected platforms appear to join together and form a traversable walkway. Other areas use jigsaw puzzles, movable mirrors, and other effects to create new routes. These mechanics were integrated into the game's compact explorable environments, with Penacony's dreamscape visually characterized by geometric structures, dream-like bubbles, optical illusions, and classical jazz music.

== Lore ==
In the game's lore, Penacony was originally a barren desert world controlled by the Interastral Peace Corporation (IPC), a powerful interstellar megacorporation. The planet was used as a penal colony at first, where inmates were forced to collect memories for an organization known as the Garden of Recollection. Over time, the prisoners' consciousnesses became connected through dreams, increasingly separating them from physical reality. The IPC eventually lost control of Penacony after the appearance of a Stellaron, a highly dangerous yet mysterious cosmic object capable of causing disasters and distorting entire worlds. This prompted a prisoner named Hanunue to lead a rebellion that began a war for the planet's independence. Penacony subsequently came under the influence of the Family, an organization devoted to the Path of the Harmony. Within the game's universe, immensely powerful god-like beings called Aeons embody different philosophical ideals, known as Paths, which influence the beliefs and actions of the game's characters. The Family follows the Path of Harmony and worships Xipe, its Aeon. A man named Gopher Wood, the leader of the Family who also has the title of Dreammaster, sought to create a paradise in dreams, free from external interference.

The Astral Express, a train carrying a group of interstellar travelers including the protagonist Trailblazer, arrives at Penacony for a major celebration by the Family known as the Charmony Festival. Its hosts include Sunday, a senior Family member, and his sister Robin, a famous singer. The Trailblazer also encounters Acheron, a mysterious swordswoman, and Firefly, a young woman who befriends them. Firefly and Robin are soon apparently killed inside Penacony's dream world, while Aventurine, an IPC member sent in an attempt to take back ownership of Penacony, is chased around by a shapeshifting trickster called Sparkle. Aventurine deliberately provokes Acheron into defeating him in combat so that he can reach a deeper part of the dream world and investigate the Family's secrets. It is later revealed that Firefly and Robin are actually alive; their supposed murderer instead transported them to a hidden area beyond the Family's control. The Trailblazer learns that Penacony's dream world was created using a Stellaron. Sunday is revealed to be a central threat to Penacony, having rejected the Family's stated ideals of Harmony in favor of the Path of Order, and he intends to trap Penacony's population in an eternal collective dream, believing that taking away people's freedom to make difficult choices will protect them from suffering. Although the Astral Express initially appears to defeat him in combat, they discover that this victory was only an illusion and that nearly everyone has already been trapped. Aided by Robin, Acheron, Firefly and their other friends, the Trailblazer awakens and works to break the collective dream. The Astral Express confronts Sunday a second time and defeats him, allowing the population of Penacony to wake up.

The Astral Express later returns to Penacony to attend a school festival at Paperfold University, only to discover that the campus and surrounding area are being overtaken by a bizarre monkey called Slumbernana Monkey, which has the power of mind control. The travelers, accompanied in part by a woman named Rappa, investigate the outbreak and learn that it is being spread by followers of Dr. Primitive, a rogue scientist, under the direction of a gorilla named Professor Primon. It is eventually discovered that the phenomenon is caused by a memetic virus and that Rappa, herself a victim of Dr. Primitive's experiments, carries memories capable of counteracting it. Using those memories, the group breaks the virus's control over the people, while Robin helps dispel its remaining influence. The group ultimately defeats Primon, restoring Paperfold University and allowing the school festival to proceed.

== Promotion and release ==
Penacony received a visual reveal by miHoYo at The Game Awards on December 7, 2023, and significant information about the region's characters and story was shown in a promotional livestream for version 1.6 of the game on December 15. A January 26, 2024, special program had a full pre-release showcase of Penacony's setting, story, and gameplay mechanics. The region was released in version 2.0 of the game on February 6, 2024. Expansions to the story were released in versions 2.1 and 2.2, both of which featured new areas of Penacony to be explored. Penacony's main story concluded with version 2.3, which was released on June 19. Paperfold University and the surrounding areas was added in version 2.6 on October 23, 2024.

== Reception and analysis ==
Critics praised Penacony's story for its mystery, cast and writing. Takayuki Sawahata of AUTOMATON described it as a "suspense drama that takes place in a dream" and indicated that the storyline made him want to continue playing the game after he had previously considered stopping. Rin Shinonome of Real Sound similarly complimented its ensemble-drama structure, in which numerous factions compete for the Watchmaker's Legacy, arguing that the characters' hidden motives, withholding information from one another, and betrayals create an atmosphere of constant suspicion. Destructoid writer Christine Choi praised Penacony's "enchanting" dreamscapes and witty dialogue, particularly its frequent humor which breaks the fourth wall and absurdity. Writer Misty Mist of Gamersky likewise argued that Penacony's apparent glamour gradually gives way to an increasingly threatening mystery, as its cheerful festival atmosphere is undermined by factions with competing agendas, unstable environments, murders, and enemies. Reception to the story's conclusion was more divided, with another Gamersky writer noting disagreement among players over whether it provided a satisfying ending. The outlet connected this debate to the story's recurring question: "Why does life slumber?". It observed that characters such as Firefly and Aventurine provide different answers to that question, and it argued that Penacony deliberately leaves room for different interpretations of what a satisfactory ending for Penacony would be like.

Critics also interpreted Penacony as commentary on escapism, prosperity and social anxiety. Sawahata argued that its retro, American-influenced dream paradise evoked both nostalgia and the pressures of contemporary Chinese society. At the time, there was a broad social mood in China around intense competition, economic pressure and more. Sawahata also noted that anxiety about the future and dissatisfaction with everyday life were not unique to China and are similar present in Japan, similar to what was seen in Penacony. Shinonome emphasized Penacony's Jazz Age inspiration, pointing to references such as the resemblance of popular in-game corporate mascot Clockie to Mickey Mouse as well as in-game soda brand SoulGlad's parodying of Coca-Cola and New Coke. She also connected the setting's promise of "eternal prosperity" to the economic boom of the 1920s and the Wall Street crash of 1929. Gamersky similarly argued that Penacony's glamorous surface gradually gives way to instability and horror, with its broken dreamscapes exposing the fragility beneath the fantastical facade. The outlet compared this to the Jazz Age itself, suggesting that just as seemingly-limitless prosperity eventually ended, every dream must ultimately end with the dreamer waking up.

Critics also praised how Penacony's dreamlike setting shaped both its visual design and gameplay. Sawahata indicated that previous story chapters felt like gameplay tutorials in comparison to Penacony. He also highlighted the region's retro aesthetic and cultural influences, describing the setting as a dreamlike paradise with a nostalgic atmosphere. Gamersky characterized Penacony as having demonstrated Honkai: Star Rail's willingness to experiment with new artistic styles, gameplay modes, and more interactive exploration. They particularly praised the area's jazz soundtrack, optical illusions, and perspective-based puzzles, arguing that its shifting geometry made exploration feel imaginative and rewarding. Choi similarly emphasized the surreal nature of the Golden Hour dreamscape, and wrote that players can walk on walls, encounter talking objects such as ice cream cones, and even have an opportunity to transform into a trash can, an experience which she found amusing. Misty Mist further argued that Penacony's dream premise allows mechanics such as perspective puzzles and emotion manipulation to break conventional spatial rules while still feeling intuitive.
