= Imperator (disambiguation) =

Imperator is a title used in the Roman Republic.

Imperator may also refer to:

== Biology ==
- Imperator (fungus), a genus of bolete mushroom
- Boa constrictor imperator, a subspecies of boa constrictor
- Pavo muticus imperator (Imperator, Indo-Chinese green peafowl, or dragonbird), a subspecies of the endangered green peafowl
- Imperator (horse), a racehorse

== Arts, entertainment, media ==
- Imperator Titan, a war machine in the fictional universe of Warhammer 40,000
- Ave Imperator, a proclamation of loyalty to Roman Emperor
- Imperator: Rome, a video game by Paradox Development Studio

=== Characters ===
- a title used in Saga of the Skolian Empire by science fiction author Catherine Asaro
- a rank used in the Mad Max franchise, held by Furiosa amongst others
- In the tabletop role-playing game Nobilis, Imperator is the term given for the god-like beings that empower the titular player characters.
- Cerydra, a character in the video game Honkai: Star Rail who uses the title Imperator

== Other uses ==
- a title used in occult societies, such as AMORC, Confraternity of the Rose Cross, or FUDOSI
- Imperator (ship), a German ocean liner

== See also ==
- Emperor (disambiguation)
