= Kanon Takao =

Japanese voice actress

- 高尾 奏音
- Born: September 10, 2002 (age 24); Tokyo, Japan
- Education: Aoyama Gakuin University
- Occupation: Voice actress
- Years active: 2014–present
- Agent: Ancheri（Link Plan)
- Notable work: BanG Dream! as Oblivionis/Sakiko Togawa; If It's for My Daughter, I'd Even Defeat a Demon Lord as Latina; The Detective Is Already Dead as Yui Saikawa
- Height: 152 cm (5 ft 0 in)

Kanon Takao (Japanese: 高尾 奏音, Hepburn: Takao Kanon; born September 10, 2002) is a Japanese voice actress from Tokyo, Japan. After passing an audition in 2014, she made her debut as part of the idol group Earth Star Dream under EARTH STAR Entertainment. Following Earth Star Dream going on hiatus, she would continue her entertainment activities as a solo artist. She is known for her roles as Yū Hiraoka in Ani Tore! EX, Azalyn Goza the 168th in The Irresponsible Captain Tylor, Iris in Konosuba, Linnea in The Master of Ragnarok & Blesser of Einherjar, Latina in If It's for My Daughter, I'd Even Defeat a Demon Lord, Yui Saikawa in The Detective Is Already Dead, Rit in Banished from the Hero's Party, Noelle in Genshin Impact, Cerydra in Honkai: Star Rail, and being the keyboardist and leader for the band Ave Mujica of the BanG Dream! multimedia franchise, portraying the character of Sakiko Togawa/Oblivionis. She left EARTH STAR Entertainment and became affiliated with Link Plan all in the same year of 2018.

== Biography ==
Takao was born in Tokyo on September 10, 2002. Her older brother Sōnosuke is a pianist and composer. She learned to play the piano at an early age, and she won an international piano contest held in Milan, Italy, when she was 10 years old.

In 2014, Takao participated in a voice acting audition held by the publishing company Earth Star Entertainment. She was declared one of the audition's two winners, along with Yuki Nakashima. Takao, Nakashima, and other participants in the audition then formed the idol group Earth Star Dream. During this period, she played the roles of Yū Hiraoka in Ani Tore! EX, Azalyn Goza the 168th in The Irresponsible Captain Tylor, and Linnea in The Master of Ragnarok & Blesser of Einherjar. She also formed the singing duo Hikanon together with labelmate Hikaru Koide; the duo performed the song "Smile Invitation" which was used as the theme song to The Irresponsible Galaxy Tylor.

After Earth Star Dream went on hiatus at the end of 2017, Takao initially remained with Earth Star Entertainment, but left the company in April 2018 after they ceased their talent management activities. She then joined the talent agency Link Plan in September of that year. In 2019, she was cast as Latina in the anime television series If It's for My Daughter, I'd Even Defeat a Demon Lord; she also performed the series' opening theme "I'm With You". In 2020, she was cast as Hina Tsurugi, the protagonist of the anime television series Diary of Our Days at the Breakwater. In 2021, she was cast in several anime television series: Chisa Shiraishi in Idoly Pride, Yui Saikawa in The Detective Is Already Dead, and Rit in Banished from the Hero's Party, among others.

In September 2023, the finale of the anime series BanG Dream! It's MyGO!!!!! revealed the real-life members of the band Ave Mujica, who up to that point were anonymous; Takao was revealed to be the character Oblivionis/Sakiko Togawa. She is a member of the real-life Ave Mujica band, serving as the keyboardist. She reprised her role in the sequel BanG Dream! Ave Mujica.

== Filmography ==
=== Anime ===
2015

- Teekyu as Natalia
- Ani Tore! EX as Yū Hiraoka

2016

- Usakame as Tasuku Kodaira

2017

- The Irresponsible Captain Tylor as Azalyn Goza the 168th
- Yuri's World as Yuri

2018

- Encouragement of Climb Third Season as Yuri
- The Master of Ragnarok & Blesser of Einherjar as Linnea

2019

- Demon Lord, Retry! as Aku
- If It's for My Daughter, I'd Even Defeat a Demon Lord as Latina

2020

- Asteroid in Love as Haruka Itozaki
- Magia Record as Mel Anna
- Diary of Our Days at the Breakwater as Hina Tsurugi
- Warlords of Sigrdrifa as Kurumi Suzuhara

2021

- Idoly Pride as Chisa Shiraishi
- Shinkansen Henkei Robo Shinkalion Z as Ayu Arata
- Edens Zero as Hermit Mio
- The Detective Is Already Dead as Yui Saikawa
- Banished from the Hero's Party as Rit
- Muv-Luv Alternative as Kasumi Yashiro

2022

- In the Land of Leadale as Luka
- Yu-Gi-Oh! Go Rush!! as Yuna Goha
- Management of a Novice Alchemist as Sarasa Ford

2023

- BanG Dream! It's MyGO!!!!! as Sakiko Togawa
- My Unique Skill Makes Me OP Even at Level 1 as Alice Wonderland
- My Daughter Left the Nest and Returned an S-Rank Adventurer as Charlotte
- Tearmoon Empire as Tiona Rudolvon

2024

- Banished from the Hero's Party 2nd Season as Rit
- Studio Apartment, Good Lighting, Angel Included as Hisui Tsurumi
- KonoSuba 3 as Iris
- Loner Life in Another World as Vice Rep B

2025

- BanG Dream! Ave Mujica as Oblivionis/Sakiko Togawa
- The 100 Girlfriends Who Really, Really, Really, Really, Really Love You 2nd Season as Meme Kakure
- Apocalypse Bringer Mynoghra as Caria

2026

- Haibara's Teenage New Game+ as Hikari Hoshimiya
- The World's Strongest Rearguard as Madoka

2027

- Bride of the Barrier Master as Hazuki Ichise

=== Video games ===
2018

- Magia Record as Mel Anna and Kagome Satori
- Kantai Collection as Gotland, Hachijo, Ishigaki, Shin'yō, Sheffield

2020

- Brave Nine as Seol Ah
- Genshin Impact as Noelle
- Kono Subarashii Sekai ni Shukufuku o! Fantastic Days as Iris

2021

- Idoly Pride as Chisa Shiraishi

2022

- Artery Gear: Fusion as Blue
- Cookie Run: Kingdom as Milky Way Cookie

2025

- Honkai: Star Rail as Cerydra

2026

- Arknights as Sakiko Togawa
- Zenless Zone Zero as Nangong Yu
- BanG Dream! Our Notes as Oblivionis/Sakiko Togawa
