= Riko Kohara =

Japanese voice actress and singer

- 小原 莉子
- Born: February 3, 1990 (age 36); Gifu Prefecture, Japan
- Other name: Rikopin (りこぴん)
- Occupations: Voice actress; Guitarist
- Years active: 2014–present
- Notable work: BanG Dream! as Rokka Asahi/Lock; Senran Kagura as Gekkō; Kandagawa Jet Girls as Misa Aoi
- Height: 156 cm (5 ft 1 in)
- Musical career
- Genres: J-pop; Anison
- Instruments: Guitar; vocals
- Years active: 2011–present
- Website: object-co.jp/talent/riko_kohara/

Riko Kohara (小原 莉子, Kohara Riko; born February 3, 1990) is a Japanese voice actress and guitarist from Gifu Prefecture.

== Career ==
Kohara's interest in voice acting began in high school; growing up, she was a fan of manga and anime like Naruto. She later moved to Tokyo to pursue a music career, and graduated from ESP College of Entertainment, a vocational school that specializes in electric guitar and basses. According to a high school friend, Kohara switched from vocals to guitar when her guitarist band mate asked to switch their position. While she was in vocational school, she studied under BURNY's guitarist Masanori Kusakabe, who is also from Gifu Prefecture. Therefore, Kohara inherited Kusakabe's playing style.

In July 2011, Kohara became a member of The Sketchbook, a band based on a fictional group in the anime Sket Dance. She learned of the band hosting auditions while attending ESP College of Entertainment; although she had not played guitar in three months and was considering quitting, she passed her audition and won the guitarist position. Joined by Hiroshi Tada (vocal and bass) and Yuu Watanabe (drum), the three performed the opening, endings, and insert songs for the anime. The band disbanded in 2015 as the members wanted to focus on their own dreams.

In 2014, one year prior to The Sketchbook's disbandment, Kohara debuted as a voice actress with her first role as a vegetable-hater boy in Soreyuke! Anpanman.

In 2018, Kohara was recruited by Bushiroad president Takaaki Kidani to join the music franchise BanG Dream! after a fan sent a video of her performances to Kidani on social media. She joined the franchise's backup band The Third (Beta) as guitarist during its first live on March 25, 2018, at Shimokitazawa Garden. The band was renamed to Raise A Suilen at the second live on July 17, and its members received their own in-universe anime and game characters at the BanG Dream! 6th☆Live on December 7. Kohara's character Rokka Asahi shares various traits with her voice actress, such as moving from Gifu to Tokyo, while her birthday is July 17. Kohara used to perform with a Gibson Les Paul, but switched to Strandberg after joining RAS.

== Personal life ==
Kohara has an older sister.

== Filmography ==
=== Television anime series ===
- BanG Dream! as Rokka Asahi/Lock
  - BanG Dream! 2nd Season (2019)
  - BanG Dream! 3rd Season (2020)
  - BanG Dream! Girls Band Party! Pico: Ohmori (2020)
  - BanG Dream! Episode of Roselia II: Song I am. (2021)
  - BanG Dream! Film Live 2nd Stage (2021)
  - BanG Dream! Girls Band Party! Pico Fever! (2021)
  - BanG Dream! Poppin'Dream! (2022)
- Caligula as Lily
- Phantasy Star Online 2 The Animation as Riko
- Idol Memories as Nanami Hoshi
- Sket Dance as Female Kid's Singer
- Soreyuke! Anpanman as Nekomi, Vegetable-hater boy
- Ice Kuritaro as Berry-chan
- 25-sai no Joshikōsei as Hasegawa
- Persona 5: The Animation as female character
- Senran Kagura Shinovi Master as Gekkō
- Gifu no Tate ka Yoko as Tatekayoko
- Kandagawa Jet Girls as Misa Aoi
- The 8th Son? Are You Kidding Me? as Miliyama
- Teppen!!!!!!!!!!!!!!! Laughing 'til You Cry as Mako Shirakabe

=== Video games ===
- Art Code Summoner as Gustave Courbet
- Azur Lane as USS Richmond (CL-9)
- BanG Dream! Girls Band Party! as Rokka Asahi/Lock
- Hoshizora Tetsudō to Shiro no Tabi as Hanae
- Kandagawa Jet Girls as Misa Aoi
- Shinobi Master Senran Kagura: New Link as Gekkō
- Wonder Gravity as Pycno
- Crash Fever as Noa
- Arknights as Mulberry
- Counter:Side as Lin Xien
- Ys X: Nordics as Momina Evelies
