= Yumene Connect =

Japanese manga series

- First tankōbon volume cover

ゆめねこねくと (Yumene Konekuto)
- Genre: Slapstick; Romantic comedy; Science fiction
- Manga
- Written by: Kō Sawada
- Published by: Kodansha
- Imprint: Shōnen Magazine Comics
- Magazine: Weekly Shōnen Magazine
- Original run: September 4, 2024 – present
- Volumes: 10
- Anime television series
- Directed by: Sōta Yokote
- Written by: Gigaemon Echikawa
- Music by: Hayato Matsumura
- Studio: Studio Massket
- icon

Yumene Connect (Japanese: ゆめねこねくと, Hepburn: Yumene Konekuto) is a Japanese manga series written and illustrated by Kō Sawada. It began serialization in Kodansha's Weekly Shōnen Magazine in September 2024, and has been compiled into ten volumes as of October 2026. An anime television series adaptation produced by Studio Massket has been announced.

== Plot ==
The series follows Yūhi Takamiya, a first-year high school student and a loner. Having missed his entire first week of school due to a sudden illness, he becomes conscious of the fact that he has been unable to make any friends. Suddenly, an alien named Nano arrives after hearing his plight and aims to help him. However, this only leads to lewd hijinks affecting him and those around him. Nano, together with an alien lifeform named Nyoru Puppu Panpippi, comes to live with Yūhi.

== Characters ==
Yūhi Takamiya (高宮 遊日, Takamiya Yūhi)
Voiced by: Yūsuke Kobayashi
A high school freshman who was unable to make friends due to missing his first week of school. Because of his plight, he copes by making up a bookworm persona.
Nano (ナノ)
Voiced by: Yū Sasahara
An alien who works for the Yumeneko Company. She came to Earth after learning of Yūhi's situation and tries to help him by offering her company's products.
Nyoru Puppu Panpippi (ニョルプップパンピッピ)
An alien being who comes to Earth together with Nano.
Koharu Takamiya (高宮 小春, Takamiya Koharu)
Yūhi's older sister, who works as a nurse.
Kana Shiraishi (白石 香奈, Shiraishi Kana)
Yūhi's classmate. She likes cute things, which made her gain an interest in Nano and Nyoru. She becomes Yūhi's first friend.
Momoka Saeki (佐伯 桃果, Saeki Momoka)
A second-year student and Yūhi's senior. She aims to start an Occult Research Club at school and seeks his help in establishing it.
Hikaru Saeki (佐伯 光, Saeki Hikaru)
Momoka's younger brother and Yūhi's classmate, who usually avoids going to school.

== Media ==
=== Manga ===
The series is written and illustrated by Kō Sawada. It began serialization in Kodansha's Weekly Shōnen Magazine on September 4, 2024, and has been compiled into ten volumes as of October 2026.

No.	Release date	ISBN
1	November 15, 2024	978-4-06-537392-7
2	January 17, 2025	978-4-06-538069-7
3	April 16, 2025	978-4-06-539097-9
4	July 16, 2025	978-4-06-539761-9
5	September 17, 2025	978-4-06-540696-0
6	December 17, 2025	978-4-06-541942-7
7	February 17, 2026	978-4-06-542629-6
8	May 15, 2026	978-4-06-543625-7
9	July 16, 2026	978-4-06-544340-8
10	October 16, 2026	978-4-06-545285-1

=== Anime ===
An anime television series adaptation was announced on October 14, 2026. It will be produced by Studio Massket and directed by Sōta Yokote, with Gigaemon Echikawa handling series composition and screenplays, Yoshihiro Watanabe designing the characters, and Hayato Matsumura composing the music.
