= Yū Sasahara =

Japanese voice actress

- 篠原 侑
- Born: April 30; Kumamoto Prefecture
- Years active: 2016–present
- Agent: I'm Enterprise
- Notable work: Ms. Vampire Who Lives in My Neighborhood as Akari Amano; Kandagawa Jet Girls as Rin Namiki; Diary of Our Days at the Breakwater as Yūki Kuroiwa; Shadows House as Emilico; Genshin Impact as Lynette

Yū Sasahara (篠原 侑, Sasahara Yū; born April 30) is a Japanese voice actress from Kumamoto Prefecture who is affiliated with I'm Enterprise. She began her career in 2016, and in 2018 she played her first main role as Akari Amano in the anime television series Ms. Vampire Who Lives in My Neighborhood.

== Biography ==
Sasahara learned to play the piano at a young age and dreamed of becoming a singer during her elementary school years. She was persuaded against pursuing that career by her parents, who advised her that becoming one was difficult. While in junior high school, she played the clarinet as a member of her school's brass band. Around this time, she was encouraged to pursue a career in voice acting by her father, who told her that she could sing, act, and appear on TV in that line of work. Her father then encouraged her by printing out an audition form for a role in the Japanese dub of the film The Golden Compass, although she ultimately did not push through with auditioning. Nevertheless, as she had already been interested in anime and manga, the experience influenced her to investigate voice acting more and learn about anime production.

During her third year of high school, Sasahara applied for enrollment at the Japan Narration Acting Institute. After passing the entrance examinations, she enrolled at the school while also going to university. While in her third year of training, she received a notification that the she had been accepted into the I'm Enterprise talent agency; she then debuted as a voice actress in 2016. Among her earliest roles was as the character Li Xuelan in the 2018 anime series Märchen Mädchen. Later that year, she was cast in her first main role as the character Akari Amano in the anime series Ms. Vampire Who Lives in My Neighborhood. The following year, she was cast as Rū Hitoma in the anime series Over Drive Girl 1/6 and Rin Namiki in the multimedia franchise Kandagawa Jet Girls. In 2020, she was cast as Yūki Kuroiwa in the anime series Diary of Our Days at the Breakwater. In 2021, she was cast as Emilico in the anime series Shadows House.

== Filmography ==
=== Anime ===
2016

- Love Live! Sunshine!! as Female student
- Classicaloid as Child

2017

- Urara Meirocho
- Minami Kamakura High School Girls Cycling Club as Marie Unuma

2018

- Dagashi Kashi 2
- Märchen Mädchen as Li Xuelan
- Happy Sugar Life as Mei Kunizuka (episodes 2, 4)
- Kyōto Teramachi Sanjō no Holmes as Kumi Kitamoto (episode 4)
- Ms. Vampire Who Lives in My Neighborhood as Akari Amano

2019

- Over Drive Girl 1/6 as Rū Hitoma
- Kandagawa Jet Girls as Rin Namiki

2020

- Asteroid in Love as Girl
- Diary of Our Days at the Breakwater as Yūki Kuroiwa
- Listeners as Loudspeaker, Grange & Anorak Brothers, Minami Girl
- Mewkledreamy as Women (2), Moderator
- Lapis Re:Lights as Salsa
- Dropout Idol Fruit Tart as Nua Nakamachi

2021

- Shadows House as Emilico
- Platinum End as Akira

2022

- Shadows House 2nd Season as Emilico

2023

- The Magical Revolution of the Reincarnated Princess and the Genius Young Lady as Tilty Claret
- Dark Gathering as Yayoi Hōzuki

2024

- Puniru Is a Cute Slime as Puniru

2025

- From Bureaucrat to Villainess: Dad's Been Reincarnated! as Josette
- Puniru Is a Cute Slime 2nd Season as Puniru

2026

- Yowayowa Sensei as Yūki Yukishita

TBA

- Yumene Connect as Nano

=== Games ===
- Lapis Re:Lights as Salsa
- Umamusume: Pretty Derby as Curren Chan
- Kandagawa Jet Girls as Rin Namiki
- Azur Lane as USS Boise
- Birdie Crush as Lucie de Bei
- Azure Striker Gunvolt 3 as Kirin
- Gunvolt Chronicles: Luminous Avenger iX 2 as Kirin
- Genshin Impact as Lynette
- Wuthering Waves as Verina
- Girls' Frontline 2: Exilium as Leva
