= Diary of Our Days at the Breakwater =

Japanese manga and anime series

- Cover of the first manga volume

放課後ていぼう日誌 (Hōkago Teibō Nisshi)
- Genre: Sports (recreational fishing)
- Manga
- Written by: Yasuyuki Kosaka
- Published by: Akita Shoten
- Magazine: Young Champion Retsu
- Original run: February 2017 – present
- Volumes: 11
- Anime television series
- Directed by: Takaharu Okuma
- Produced by: Shousei Itou; Tomoyuki Oowada; Noritomo Isogai; Shinpei Yamashita; Hajime Kamata; Yuuji Satou; Chiaki Tanimoto; Keishi Gotou
- Written by: Fumihiko Shimo
- Music by: Miki Sakurai
- Studio: Doga Kobo
- Licensed by: Crunchyroll: SA/SEA: Muse Communication
- Original network: AT-X, Tokyo MX, MBS, BS11, RKK
- Original run: April 7, 2020 – September 22, 2020
- Episodes: 12
- Television drama
- Directed by: Takahiro Horie
- Written by: Takeshi Miyamoto
- Original network: Lemino
- Original run: June 13, 2023 – August 8, 2023
- Episodes: 9

Diary of Our Days at the Breakwater (放課後ていぼう日誌, Hōkago Teibō Nisshi; lit. 'Afterschool Embankment Journal') is a Japanese manga series about recreational fishing by Yasuyuki Kosaka. It has been serialized in Akita Shoten's seinen manga magazine Young Champion Retsu since February 2017 and collected in eleven tankōbon volumes as of September 2023. An anime television series adaptation by Doga Kobo aired from April 7 to September 22, 2020. A live-action web drama adaptation aired from June to August 2023.

== Plot ==
Hina Tsurugi has just moved to Ashikita, Kumamoto and is adjusting to life in her new town. One day, her classmate Yūki Kuroiwa invites her to go fishing. When Hina tries it out, she finds it difficult at first, but Yūki sees her potential. Yūki invites Hina to join the Breakwater Club, wanting to share with her the joys of fishing. Despite her initial hesitation, Hina eventually joins the club and befriends its other members, finding their friendship as her way of finding fulfillment in her new life.

== Characters ==
Hina Tsurugi (鶴木陽渚, Tsurugi Hina)
Voiced by: Kanon Takao (Japanese); Megan Harvey (English)
Portrayed by: Riko
Hina is the main protagonist who moves with her family from Tokyo back to her home town of Ashikita, Kumamoto, Kyushu. She ends up joining the Breakwater Club at her new school.
Natsumi Hodaka (帆高夏海, Hodaka Natsumi)
Voiced by: Natsumi Kawaida (Japanese); G. K. Bowes (English)
Portrayed by: Natsumi Ikema
Hina's childhood friend, whom Hina had nearly forgotten, she is a first-year like Hina and also a new member of the Breakwater Club. She is passionate about fishing, and has been fishing since elementary school.
Yūki Kuroiwa (黒岩悠希, Kuroiwa Yūki)
Voiced by: Yū Sasahara (Japanese); Jessica D. Stone (English)
Portrayed by: Noa Tsurushima
An older girl who convinces Hina to join the Breakwater Club at their school, of which she is the president. She is a third-year. In the English dub, she has a southern accent.
Makoto Ohno (大野真, Ōno Makoto)
Voiced by: Satomi Akesaka (Japanese); Lauren Landa (English)
Portrayed by: Hinako Kikuchi
A second-year in the Breakwater Club, she is quite knowledgeable and reliable. She is a tall girl who wears glasses and always fishes with a lifejacket.
Sayaka Kotani (小谷さやか, Kotani Sayaka)
Voiced by: Ami Koshimizu (Japanese); Cherami Leigh (English)
The school nurse and the faculty adviser of the Breakwater Club.
Hina's Father
Voiced by: Hiroaki Tajiri (Japanese); Jon Bailey (English)
Portrayed by: Kenji Yabe
He was a member of the club when he went to school. Hina's grandfather left behind an assortment of fishing gear.
Takohigeya Manager
Voiced by: Shigeru Chiba (Japanese); Christopher Corey Smith (English)
He runs the local fishing supplies store whose mascot is a small red octopus.

== Media ==
=== Manga ===
The manga is written and illustrated by Yasuyuki Kosaka, and began serialization in Akita Shoten's Young Champion Retsu magazine in February 2017. It has been published as eleven tankōbon volumes by September 20, 2023. In July 2020, it was announced that the manga would go on hiatus due to heavy flooding in Kosaka's home of Kyushu; the series resumed serialization shortly afterward. In November 2020, it was announced it will go on a hiatus again at a later date. Publication resumed in April 2021.

=== Anime ===
The 12-episode anime television series adaptation was announced in the fifth issue of Young Champion Retsu magazine on April 16, 2019. The series is animated by Doga Kobo and directed by Takaharu Okuma, with Fumihiko Shimo handling series composition, Katsuhiro Kumagai designing the characters, and Miki Sakurai composing the music. It aired from April 7 to September 22, 2020. The opening theme "SEA HORIZON" and end credits song "Tsuri no Sekai e" were both performed by the main cast. On April 15, 2020, it was announced that episode 4 and onward were delayed until further notice due to the effects of the COVID-19 pandemic. On June 1, 2020, it was announced that the anime series would resume on July 7, 2020, from the first episode, with the fourth episode airing on July 28, 2020.

An English dub was released, which was streamed by Funimation in early 2021.

No.	Title	Directed by (Note: Information is taken from the ending credits of each episode.)	Written by	Original release date
1	"Breakwater Club"; Transliteration: "Teibō-bu" (Japanese: ていぼう部)	Takaharu Ōkuma	Fumihiko Shimo	April 7, 2020
Having just moved back to Ashikita, Hina Tsurugi explores the seaside town and helps the Breakwater Club president Yuki Kuroiwa untangle a fishing line. Yuki hands Hina a line for her to try fishing herself and she catches an octopus that lands on her legs. Afraid of the sea creatures there, Yuki coerces Hina into joining the Breakwater Club to get the octopus off her. The next day, Hina begins her new high school life at Umino High School intending to ditch the Breakwater Club to join the Handicrafts Club. However, when Hina finds that her childhood neighbor Natsumi Hodaka is joining the Breakwater Club, she could not bring herself to drop out. Hina gives fishing a try and decides she likes it enough to stay with the club for the time being.
2	"Reels and Casting"; Transliteration: "Rīru to Kyasutingu" (Japanese: リールとキャスティング)	Ryouki Kamitsubo	Shingo Nagai	April 14, 2020
Hina brings home some of the fish the club caught, and her father tells her that he was a member of the Breakwater Club during his high school days. The next day, Hina tires herself out with the tests in physical education and laments on how far away the clubroom is from the school due to her physical ineptitude. At the club room, Hina and Natsumi are tasked by Yuki with untangling some fishing lines per club ritual, which Makoto Ohno later tells them is not a ritual. Hina spends the afternoon learning the basics of fishing from Yuki and Makoto. Hina struggles with casting often hitting Natsumi with the hook. After an exhausting day of fishing, the other girls encourage her to keep trying.
3	"Flatheads"; Transliteration: "Magochi" (Japanese: マゴチ)	Yoshihiro Yamaguchi	Yasuhiro Imagawa	April 21, 2020
After Hina does some research on flatheads, the club goes to Kamegahama beach to fish for flatheads. Hina and Yuki fish together in one spot while Natsumi and Makoto fish at another. Hina struggles as she catches nothing but snagging seaweed. Yuki teaches Hina how to move the lure to get a flathead to chase it, and after some more attempts, Hina hooks a flathead. Hina struggles with reeling it in nearly falling into the ocean, but with help from Yuki and Makoto she catches it. That night, Hina is tasked with cutting the flathead since she caught it, and after struggling, she goes through with it. Makoto fillets and cooks the fish for dinner.
4	"Eging"; Transliteration: "Egingu" (Japanese: エギング)	Kim Seong Min	Yasuhiro Imagawa	July 28, 2020
With Hina needing to buy a fishing hat and jacket, the club heads out to a fishing supply store. Hina finds a jacket she likes on sale after an extensive search, while the club buys her a hat. The next day, Hina ties some fishing line and the club goes fishing for squid. After Natsumi struggles with losing a lure and Hina has trouble attracting the squid to her lure, Makoto catches it. The squid squirts out ink, but Hina's jacket protects her from it. The club cooks the squid for dinner that night.
5	"Clamming and an Advisor"; Transliteration: "Shiohigari to Komon" (Japanese: 潮干狩りと顧問)	Tatsuya Nokimori	Shingo Nagai	August 4, 2020
With the tide low, the club goes digging for clams. Hina is initially reluctant to dig because she is afraid of getting covered in mud, but after Natsumi teases her causing her to stumble, she becomes used to the mud and begins digging. Afterwards, the club advisor, the school nurse Sayaka Kotani, drops by and Yuki and Makoto desperately try to hide the clams from her, but fail. The two upperclassmen explain that Sayaka is not interested in fishing at all and is only the club's advisor to drink beer and eat some of their seafood for free.
6	"Li'l Horsies"; Transliteration: "Ajigo" (Japanese: アジゴ)	Shōgo Arai	Fumihiko Shimo	August 11, 2020
Sayaka drops by asking the club to catch horse mackerels. The club shops at the local fishing supply store to buy some lines. The club fishes for two hours catching a lot of mackerels. Afterwards, Hina is tasked with removing the gills from the fish causing her to freak out, but she manages to do it. During the weekend, Hina goes fishing on her own using her grandfather's old fishing equipment to catch mackerels, but has a hard time catching any. Hina calls Natsumi for help, and Natsumi points out that she is using hooks that are too big for catching mackerels. Together, they are successful in catching a haul of mackerels.
7	"Light Rock Fishing"; Transliteration: "Anazuri" (Japanese: 穴釣り)	Takafumi Fujii	Shingo Nagai	August 18, 2020
Hina goes rock fishing and taking Makoto's advice to angle on the rocks right next to the wall. She catches a scorpionfish, but struggles with unhooking it due to the fish's spiny body, but is helped by Natsumi. With midterms coming up, Hina goes over to Natsumi's house where she meets her mother, who runs a Western-style restaurant, for the first time since moving back to Ashikita. The two spend all day studying, and Natsumi is fascinated by her felt horse mackerel plush that she knitted.
8	"Freshwater Prawns"; Transliteration: "Tenagaebi" (Japanese: 穴テナガエビ)	Kim Seong Min	Yasuhiro Imagawa	August 25, 2020
On a rainy day, the club convenes in the nurse's office where they retrieve some fishing equipment stored away. The club obtains a fishing permit to allow them to fish for freshwater prawns at a nearby river underneath a bridge. Hina struggles to catch prawns as she has a hard time timing her reel correctly. After getting some advice, she begins to catch them. The next day after allowing some time for the prawns to expel the dirt, the Hina and Makoto cooks the prawns for the club and Sayaka to eat.
9	"Preparations and Herons"; Transliteration: "Sonae to Aosagi" (Japanese: 備えとアオサギ)	Masahiko Ohta	Shingo Nagai	September 1, 2020
Sayaka holds a training session at the school swimming pool for the club to learn how to stay afloat should they fall into the water while fishing. The club jumps into the pool with their clothes on and use special flotation devices unaware that they are for single use only. The club then goes fishing for rockfish, and Hina catches some rockfishes that get snatched up by a heron. Hina notices that the heron's leg is tangled in discarded fishing line, prompting her to think of a way to get it off. The next day, the club lures the heron into a trap to hold it still so that they can remove the line from the heron's leg.
10	"No-reel Fishing"; Transliteration: "Nobesao" (Japanese: のべ竿)	Masahiko Watanabe	Takaharu Ōkuma	September 8, 2020
The club goes fishing using bobs and fishing rods without reels. The club struggles while Hina catches only small fish leading her to be discouraged. But at sunset, Hina catches a big horse mackerel. That night after the club catches a big haul of mackerels, Makoto teaches Hina how to fillet a fish, which freaks her out. Hina's first attempt at filleting does not go well, which Makoto turns into a sashimi salad, while improving with her subsequent attempts. The filleted fishes are stored in the refrigerator to dry out, and on the next day the club cooks the fish on a grill provided by Sayaka.
11	"Whiting"; Transliteration: "Kisu" (Japanese: キス)	Geisei Morita	Fumihiko Shimo	September 15, 2020
Hina catches a pin-spotted spinefoot, a poisonous fish that Makoto prepares for the club to eat. That night, Hina's mother cooks some whiting the neighbors gave her inspiring Hina to go fishing for whiting. While shopping for supplies, Hina is terrified by the ragworms the club is using as bait to catch whiting, but the store manager shows her some artificial bait that she can use instead. The club fishes for whiting from the beach, and while Natsumi, Yuki and Makoto have success, Hina struggles. She then realizes that the same techniques the others are using are not effective artificial bait. That night, Hina goes home to research how to fish using artificial bait determined to catch some whiting the next day.
12	"From Now On..."; Transliteration: "Korekara..." (Japanese: これから...)	Yoshino Shirahata	Fumihiko Shimo	September 22, 2020
Hina tries again to catch whiting after finding out that the bait needs to wiggle, but continues to struggle. She then realizes that the hook is too far up the bait, and after making that adjustment she finally catches a whiting. Sometime later, Natsumi comes over to Hina's house and Hina helps her make a felt fish plushie. The next day, Hina teaches Yuki and Makoto how to make a felt plushie. Hina then reveals the real reason she did not join the Handicrafts Club is because she was surprised to find out that all the members are boys. Hina lets the club know that she is having fun with the club and that she was glad to join.

=== Drama ===
A live-action web series was announced on January 17, 2023. The series is directed by Takahiro Horie, and scripts are written by Takeshi Miyamoto. The theme song, "Watashi-tachi no Journey" (Our Journey), is performed by Kaneyorimasaru. It aired from June 13 to August 8, 2023, on the Lemino streaming service in Japan.

== Reception ==
=== Previews ===
Anime News Network had four editors review the first episode of the anime: Nick Creamer felt the premiere suffered from "structural, narrative, and aesthetic issues" that prevent it from capturing the same rural Japan aura as Laid-Back Camp and displayed "tonal incongruity" with its subject matter and the Breakwater Club's hostile treatment towards Hina; Rebecca Silverman was also critical of the fishing club's cruel tactics on Hina but was commendable for their faithful portrayal of "the attitude of small coastal towns" and their various activities, concluding that fans of "slow-paced fishing stories" will enjoy it but may not attract others beyond its targeted genre audience; Theron Martin wrote that: "[T]echnical merits here are decent but nothing exceptional, so the question here is going to be whether the "cute girls" appeal can draw in those not interested in the hobby. In that regard, I put it on about the same level as Tamayomi: might be watchable, but being at least receptive to the hobby in question will matter." The fourth reviewer, James Beckett, praised its "cozy slice-of-life charm" for carrying a "soft and inviting" art direction and a likable cast that will bring Hina out of her ichthyophobia as the story progresses. Beckett added that he won't watch any further, but concluded that: "It will, however, provide much edutainment for folks who either have fond fishing memories of their own, and also for anyone who is interested in learning more about the craft with the help of a bunch of nice anime girls."

=== Series ===
Priscilla Yip of Bubbleblabber named the series "a cute high school comedy" with quality animation, writing of the vocal performances: "The accents in the voice acting help with the countryside setting of the anime." A writer for Anime Inferno thought the series offered "a remarkably nostalgic and rosy depiction of school life and serious small-town vibes." They added: "I'd also like to give a shout out to the English voice cast who used soft southern accents for the main cast in the dub. It really contributed to a quirky small town feel for the series. Actual southerners from the United States may feel different, but this Australian thought it worked well."
