= Over Drive Girl 1/6 =

Japanese manga and anime series

- Cover of Over Drive Girl 1/6 volume 1 by Futabasha

超可動ガール1/6 (Chō Kadō Gāru 1/6)
- Manga
- Written by: Öyster
- Published by: Futabasha
- Magazine: Comic High! Monthly Action
- Original run: 2012 – 2015
- Volumes: 4
- Manga

Over Drive Girls
- Written by: Öyster
- Imprint: Action Comics
- Magazine: Nico Nico Seiga
- Original run: 2018 – 2024
- Volumes: 8
- Anime television series
- Directed by: Keitaro Motonaga
- Written by: Chabo Higurashi
- Studio: Studio A-Cat
- Original network: AT-X, Tokyo MX
- Original run: April 6, 2019 – June 22, 2019
- Episodes: 12
- icon

Over Drive Girl 1/6 (超可動ガール1/6, Chō Kadō Gāru 1/6) is a Japanese manga series by Öyster. It was serialized in Futabasha's seinen manga magazine Comic High! between 2012 and 2015. It was also serialized in Futabasha's Monthly Action magazine in 2015. It was collected in four tankōbon volumes. A sequel series titled Over Drive Girls (超可動ガールズ, Chō Kadō Gāruzu) began serialization online via Nico Nico Seiga in 2017 and ended in 2024. It has been collected into seven tankōbon volumes. An anime television series adaptation by Studio A-Cat aired from April 6 to June 22, 2019.

== Plot ==
Haruto Bouida, is a hardcore otaku who has no interest in women outside of fiction. He purchases a bishoujo figure of Nona, the heroine of his favorite anime, which then begins moving. A comedic married-like life between Haruto and Nona begins.

== Characters ==
Haruto Bōida (房伊田 春人, Bōida Haruto)
Voiced by: Wataru Hatano
Nona (ノーナ, Nōna)
Voiced by: Suzuna Kinoshita
Belenore (ベルノア, Berunoa)
Voiced by: Sayaka Senbongi
Subaru Amanohara (天乃原 すばる, Amanohara Subaru)
Voiced by: M.A.O
Ozma (オズマ, Ozuma)
Voiced by: Toshiyuki Morikawa
Seijirō Kanmuri (冠 成次郎, Kanmuri Seijirō)
Voiced by: Kengo Kawanishi
Mikoto Bōida (房伊田 ミコト, Bōida Mikoto)
Voiced by: Risae Matsuda
Kusabi (クサビ)
Voiced by: Sora Tokui
Rindō (リンドウ)
Voiced by: Misa Fukamachi
Rū Hitoma (比等間 ルウ, Hitoma Rū)
Voiced by: Yū Sasahara

== Media ==
=== Manga ===
==== Over Drive Girl 1/6 ====
No.	Japanese release date	Japanese ISBN
1	May 10, 2013	9784575842289
2	April 10, 2014	9784575843842
3	February 10, 2015	9784575845730
4	January 12, 2016	9784575847437

==== Over Drive Girls ====
No.	Japanese release date	Japanese ISBN
1	September 12, 2018	9784575852066
2	March 12, 2019	9784575852783
3	December 12, 2019	9784575853957
4	October 12, 2020	9784575855012
5	September 9, 2021	9784575856385
6	July 12, 2022	9784575857351
7	May 11, 2023	9784575858419
8	July 11, 2024	9784575859874

=== Anime ===
An anime television series adaptation of the original series was announced on the first volume of Over Drive Girls on September 12, 2018. The series is animated by Studio A-Cat and directed by Keitaro Motonaga, with Chabo Higurashi handling series composition, and Hidekazu Ebina designing the characters. It aired from April 6 to June 22, 2019, on AT-X and Tokyo MX's FutabAnime time slot. AŌP performed the series' opening theme song "Soreyuke! Koigokoro", while Haruka Tojo performed the series' ending theme song "ONE".
