= The Master of Ragnarok & Blesser of Einherjar =

Japanese light novel series

- First light novel volume cover

百錬の覇王と聖約の戦乙女 (Hyakuren no Haō to Seiyaku no Valkyria)
- Genre: Harem, isekai
- Light novel
- Written by: Seiichi Takayama
- Illustrated by: Yukisan
- Published by: Hobby Japan
- English publisher: NA: J-Novel Club
- Imprint: HJ Bunko
- Original run: August 1, 2013 – March 1, 2023
- Volumes: 24
- Manga
- Written by: Chany
- Published by: Hobby Japan
- English publisher: NA: J-Novel Club
- Imprint: HJ Comics
- Original run: 2015 – present
- Volumes: 8
- Anime television series
- Directed by: Kōsuke Kobayashi
- Produced by: Daiki Meguro; Takaya Ibira; Makoto Kuwabara; Hideyuki Saida; Kenji Gotou; Masaaki Yokota
- Written by: Natsuko Takahashi
- Music by: Kouta Yokoseki
- Studio: EMT Squared
- Licensed by: Crunchyroll; OC/SEA: Medialink
- Original network: Tokyo MX, BS11, AT-X
- Original run: July 8, 2018 – September 23, 2018
- Episodes: 12
- icon

The Master of Ragnarok & Blesser of Einherjar (Japanese: 百錬の覇王と聖約の戦乙女(ヴァルキュリア), Hepburn: Hyakuren no Haō to Seiyaku no Varukyuria; literally "Well-Tempered High King and Valkyrie of Covenant") is a Japanese light novel series written by Seiichi Takayama and illustrated by Yukisan. The series is published in English by J-Novel Club. Chany is serializing a manga adaptation on Hobby Japan's website. An anime television series adaptation by EMT Squared aired from July to September 2018.

== Plot ==
Yuuto Suoh is a fourteen-year-old second-year junior high student who is knowledgeable about urban legends. One night, in his quest to discover if the urban legend of the local Tsukimiya Shrine was true, he irreversibly discovered that the legend was not a sham. Forcibly separated from his childhood friend and love of his life, Mitsuki Shimoya, Yuuto appeared in another world with heavy similarities to Norse mythology (while doing research on the world, he discovered that the "other world" wasn't truly another world but was an Earth in the distant past, roughly 1650 BC, the Late Bronze Age). In his quest for survival, Yuuto inadvertently rose to become the patriarch of the Wolf Clan, the family that had taken him in upon his summoning, by using the modern knowledge provided to him by his smartphone that he had unwittingly brought with him to the other world. Despite winning the affections of multiple Einherjars, magic-wielding warrior maidens, Yuuto has but one goal: to return to the side of his childhood friend and one true love (although this does not stop the other girls from trying to win him over).

== Characters ==
=== Main characters ===
Yuuto Suoh (周防勇斗, Suō Yūto)
Voiced by: Kōdai Sakai (Japanese); Brandon McInnis (English)
A junior high student turned warlord who accidentally transported himself to Yggdrasil when he took a selfie in front of a divine mirror. In the two years since his arrival, he rose to become the patriarch of the Wolf Clan and used the modern knowledge available to him to come up with new military tactics and new technologies to make his clan powerful. Despite Yuuto himself not having any unique abilities, he is a skilled commander by imitating the tactics of famous conquerors, such as Alexander the Great and Oda Nobunaga, and a skilled leader by studying important texts such as Niccolò Machiavelli's The Prince and Sun Tzu's The Art of War.
Felicia (フェリシア, Ferishia)
Voiced by: Rie Suegara (Japanese); Bryn Apprill (English)
One of the Wolf Clan's Einherjars and Yuuto's sworn younger sister. She fights using a whip and her rune allows her to move at superhuman speeds. She also secretly harbors a crush on Yuuto, taking every opportunity to seduce him with her beauty.
Sigrun (ジークルーネ, Jīkurūne)
Voiced by: Arisa Date (Japanese); Amanda Lee (English)
One of the Wolf Clan's Einherjars and Yuuto's sworn daughter. She fights using a katana given to her by Yuuto and her rune enhances her strength. She greatly admires Yuuto, desiring his praise and causing her to be very protective of him. This eventually causes her to develop feelings for him.

=== Supporting characters ===
Ingrid (イングリット, Inguritto)
Voiced by: Maki Kawase (Japanese); Felecia Angelle (English)
One of the Wolf Clan's Einherjars and Yuuto's sworn daughter. Her rune gives her master-class blacksmith skills. She has a crush on Yuuto and often misinterprets the meaning behind his words as him wanting to have intercourse with her.
Linnea (リネーア, Rinēa)
Voiced by: Kanon Takao (Japanese); Jad Saxton (English)
The patriarch of the Horn Clan who became Yuuto's sworn younger sister after her clan was conquered by the Wolf Clan. She is a hereditary patriarch, which is illegal in the meritocratic Yggdrasil. Considering herself unworthy to lead, she proposed to marry Yuuto and unify their clans with him as patriarch. Despite her proposal being diplomatic, she eventually develops a genuine affection for him. She is a skilled leader and politician.
Albertina (アルベルティーナ, Aruberutīna)
Voiced by: Aoi Yūki (Japanese); Monica Rial (English)
One of the princesses of the Claw Clan and the older twin sister of Christina. In contrast to her sister, she is innocent and slow-minded. She is an Einherjar whose rune allows her to move at superhuman speeds and conceal her presence a little, making her an excellent assassin. She became Yuuto's sworn daughter merely because her sister did so as well.
Christina (クリスティーナ, Kurisutīna)
Voiced by: Ayana Taketatsu (Japanese); Kate Bristol (English)
One of the princesses of the Claw Clan and the younger twin sister of Albertina. In contrast to her sister, she is mischievous and intelligent. She is an Eingerjar whose rune allows her to conceal her presence and increase her speed a little, which, along with her information gathering skills, makes her an excellent spy. She became Yuuto's sworn daughter due to her respecting his leadership skills.
Mitsuki Shimoya (志百家美月, Shimoya Mitsuki)
Voiced by: Aya Uchida (Japanese); Lara Woodhull (English)
Yuuto's childhood friend whom he has a crush on. She is able to call Yuuto using the phone he still possesses while he is close to the divine mirror that summoned him to Yggdrasil. When Yuuto is returned to the 21st century, while she is ecstatic, it doesn't take long for Mitsuki to realize Yuuto wants to go back, so she resolved to go with him. After managing to convince Yuuto that she won't back down on her resolution, she accepts Yuuto's marriage proposal. She is generally a little mischievous in a well-meaning way, and teases Yuuto in a friendly manner.
Leafa (リーファ, Riifa)
Voiced by: Rika Tachibana (Japanese); Lindsay Seidel (English)
A mysterious girl who turn out to be the true heir to the divine emperor of the Holy Ásgarðr Empire, the ruling power of Yggdrasil. Her real name was 'Sigrdrífa' and she bore a striking resemblance to Mitsuki. As a result, she is mistaken for Mitsuki several times, much to her chagrin. She is carefree, self-respect, and intelligible about holy magic. Her mood towards Yuuto is one of respect. After giving Yuuto a good luck kiss in battle she started have notable feelings for him. She has hereditary twin runes that mark her as the rightful heir, but as a result is weak in the sun.

== Media ==
=== Light novel ===
The light novels are written by Seiichi Takayama and illustrated by Yukisan. Hobby Japan published the first novel in August 2013. Digital publisher J-Novel Club licensed the series for an English release, and published the first four chapters on January 27, 2018.

No.	Original release date	Original ISBN	English release date	English ISBN
1	August 1, 2013	978-4-7986-0654-5	March 16, 2018	978-1-7183-2000-0
2	November 1, 2013	978-4-7986-0704-7	May 28, 2018	978-1-7183-2002-4
3	February 1, 2014	978-4-7986-0747-4	September 3, 2018	978-1-7183-2004-8
4	May 1, 2014	978-4-7986-0812-9	November 5, 2018	978-1-7183-2006-2
5	September 1, 2014	978-4-7986-0871-6	January 7, 2019	978-1-7183-2008-6
6	November 1, 2014	978-4-7986-0910-2	March 12, 2019	978-1-7183-2010-9
7	February 28, 2015	978-4-7986-0956-0	May 19, 2019	978-1-7183-2012-3
8	July 1, 2015	978-4-7986-1043-6	July 20, 2019	978-1-7183-2014-7
9	December 1, 2015	978-4-7986-1109-9	September 20, 2019	978-1-7183-2016-1
10	March 1, 2016	978-4-7986-1187-7	December 1, 2019	978-1-7183-2018-5
11	July 1, 2016	978-4-7986-1255-3	June 2, 2020	978-1-7183-2020-8
12	November 1, 2016	978-4-7986-1321-5	September 1, 2020	978-1-7183-2022-2
13	July 1, 2017	978-4-7986-1476-2	November 17, 2020	978-1-7183-2024-6
14	November 1, 2017	978-4-7986-1562-2	January 19, 2021	978-1-7183-2026-0
15	March 31, 2018	978-4-7986-1674-2	April 21, 2021	978-1-7183-2028-4
16	June 30, 2018	978-4-7986-1722-0	July 22, 2021	978-1-7183-2030-7
17	March 1, 2019	978-4-7986-1787-9	September 23, 2021	978-1-7183-2032-1
18	June 1, 2019	978-4-7986-1944-6	November 29, 2021	978-1-7183-2034-5
19	October 31, 2019	978-4-7986-2020-6	February 24, 2022	978-1-7183-2036-9
20	February 1, 2020	978-4-7986-2120-3	May 18, 2022	978-1-71832-038-3
21	August 1, 2020	978-4-7986-2228-6	September 14, 2022	978-1-7183-2040-6
22	May 1, 2021	978-4-7986-2371-9	April 6, 2023	978-1-7183-2042-0
23	October 1, 2021	978-4-7986-2576-8	June 22, 2023	978-1-7183-2045-1
24	March 1, 2023	978-4-7986-2828-8	September 14, 2023	978-1-7183-2047-5

=== Manga ===
A manga adaptation by Chany is serialized on Hobby Japan's website since 2015. J-Novel Club licensed the series for an English release, and published the first Volume on May 31, 2019.

No.	Original release date	Original ISBN	English release date	English ISBN
1	October 27, 2015	978-4-7986-1104-4	June 17, 2019	978-1-7183-4050-3
2	July 27, 2016	978-4-7986-1260-7	December 11, 2019	978-1-7183-4052-7
3	June 27, 2017	978-4-7986-1454-0	May 6, 2020	978-1-7183-4054-1
4	June 27, 2018	978-4-7986-1717-6	September 1, 2020	978-1-7183-4056-5
5	August 27, 2019	978-4-7986-1985-9	March 10, 2021	978-1-7183-4058-9
6	October 27, 2020	978-4-7986-2331-3	September 22, 2021	978-1-7183-4060-2
7	April 1, 2023	978-4-7986-3152-3	September 20, 2023	978-1-7183-4062-6
8	October 31, 2025	978-4-7986-4004-4	—	—
9	October 1, 2026	978-4-7986-4306-9	—	—

=== Anime ===
An anime television series adaptation aired from July 8 to September 23, 2018, on Tokyo MX and BS11. (Note: The series premiered on July 7, 2018 at 25:30, which is the same as July 8 at 1:30 AM.) The series was directed by Kōsuke Kobayashi and written by Natsuko Takahashi, with animation by studio EMT Squared. Mariko Ito served as the series' character designer and also as chief animation director alongside Miyako Yatsu. Aya Uchida performed the opening theme song "Bright way", while petit milady performed the ending theme song "Sekaijū ga Koi o Suru Yoru" (世界中が恋をする夜). Crunchyroll co-produced and streamed the series. Funimation produced the English dub. Following Sony's acquisition of Crunchyroll, the dub was moved to Crunchyroll. The series ran for 12 episodes. Medialink licensed the series in East (except China and Japan), Southeast Asia and Oceania (except Australia and New Zealand) and streamed it on Ani-One Asia YouTube channel.

No.	Title (Note: All English titles are taken from Crunchyroll.)	Original air date
1	"The Oath of the Chalice"; Transliteration: "Sakazuki no Chikai" (Japanese: 盃の誓い)	July 8, 2018
Yuuto Suoh, a young man who was transported to the world of Yggdrasil and became the patriarch of the Wolf Clan, leads his people into war with the Horn Clan alongside one of his Einherjars, Felicia. Using phalanx formations, which Yuuto knows about due to his knowledge of the 21st century, the Wolf Clan overpowers the Horn Clan. The battle ends in the Wolf Clan's victory when another of their Einherjars, Sigrun, captures the Horn Clan's patriarch, Linnea. Yuuto then threatens to burn the Horn Clan's capital to force her to become his sworn little sister, making her his vassal. After the battle, Yuuto contacts his childhood friend, Mitsuki Shimoya, in the 21st century using the cellphone he still possesses. Later, Yuuto and Linnea attend a ceremony where she becomes his sworn little sister. However, Yuuto then receives news that the Horn Clan is being invaded by the Hoof Clan, prompting him to come to their aid.
2	"Tactics of the Wolf"; Transliteration: "Ōkami no Senjutsu" (Japanese: 狼の戦術)	July 15, 2018
The Wolf Clan agrees to aid the Horn Clan in their conflict with the Hoof Clan. Yuuto has Sigrun perform nightly cavalry raids on the Hoof Clan's camps, depriving them of sleep and causing them to be exhausted during the battle. The Hoof Clan's patriarch, YNGVI, attempts to flank the Wolf Clan's phalanx formations, but he is intercepted by Sigrun and killed. Thus ending the battle with the Wolf and Horn Clan's victory. Later, Linnea reveals that she is hereditary patriarch, which is illegal in the technocratic Yggdrasil. Believing herself unworthy to lead, she proposes to marry Yuuto, uniting their Clans with him as patriarch. However, despite Felicia going over the advantages of this, Yuuto cannot bring himself to accept. Later, a young man arrives at the Wolf Clan's capital.
3	"Twin Runes and Twin Sisters"; Transliteration: "Sō Mon to Futago" (Japanese: 双紋と双子)	July 22, 2018
The Wolf and Horn Clans celebrate their victory over the Hoof Clan when Steinthor, the patriarch of the Lightning Clan as well as an Einherjar with two runes and the murderer of the Horn Clan's previous patriarch, arrives unannounced. He and Yuuto have a brief face-to-face after which he peacefully leaves. After the celebration, Yuuto contacts Mitsuki, who scolts him for not calling in for such a long time. Later, Yuuto is visited by twin princesses of the Claw Clan, Albertina and Christina, who came to him with a marriage proposal. However, Yuuto rejects them and Christina reveals that it just a test. She then reveals that she and her sister wish to become his sworn daughters as they had deemed him to be the greatest patriarch in Yggdrasil.
4	"Steel is Tempered One Hundred Times"; Transliteration: "Hyakuren seikō" (Japanese: 百錬成鋼)	July 29, 2018
Yuuto and Felicia visit a Horn Clan city, escorted by Albertina and Christina. The city's inhabitants were unwilling to accept their subjection by the Wolf Clan and refused to execute their policies. Luckily, Linnea was there and convinced the people to try crop change. Linnea later confronts Yuuto about her marriage proposal, which he respectfully rejects. When asked why, he tells her about him being from the 21st century and that he has a crush on Mitsuki. He is then informed that the Lightning Clan is preparing for war against the Wolf Clan. While Albertina and Christina volunteer to spy on the Lightning Clan, Yuuto does research on Steinthor and learns that he is actually a "brave fool" who can only use brute force, causing him to vow not to lose to him.
5	"The Lion That Devours the Tiger"; Transliteration: "Tora o kuu shishi" (Japanese: 虎を食う獅子)	August 5, 2018
The battle between the Wolf and the Lightning Clan begins. The Wolf Clan initially has the advantage with their superior weapons and strategies. Until Steinthor single-handedly turns the tide when he overpowers Sigrun and breaks through the Wolf Clan's phalanx formations, forcing them to retreat. He gives chase and eventually catches up with Yuuto at a river where he fights the Wolf and Horn Clan's Einherjars by himself. While Steinthor is able to hold his own, he and the Lightning Clan are defeated when they get caught in a flood wave caused by Linnea destroying a dam. Yuuto notes that Steinthor was foolish to rely only on his own strength and believes him to be dead. However, he actually survived, but with his army annihilated he is forced to admit defeat.
6	"Valkyrie's Day Off"; Transliteration: "Sen'otome no Kyūjitsu" (Japanese: 戦乙女の休日)	August 12, 2018
Following the war against the Lightning Clan, Yuuto agrees to take a vacation with Linnea and the Wolf Clan's Einherjars. However, it turned into a disaster when they all try to use the opportunity to seduce him. After the vacation, Sigrun receives a new katana from the Wolf Clan's blacksmith, Ingrid, to replace the one she lost while fighting Steinthor. However, this doesn't erase her shame for losing it in the first place, until Yuuto returns it to her after he found it on a market. Later, the Wolf Clan receives a huge profit by selling glass cups Ingrid made using Yuuto's instructions, which he then uses to fund free education.
7	"A Long-Awaited Revenge"; Transliteration: "Irō no Hōfuku" (Japanese: 遺恨の報復)	August 19, 2018
Yuuto recalls how he became patriarch: The previous patriarch, Felicia's father Farbauti, named him successor, causing his son and expected successor, Felicia's brother Loptr, to kill him out of spite and flee. Later, Yuuto is informed that the Hoof Clan has been conquered by the Panther Clan using the Wolf Clan's technology. Realizing Loptr is their patriarch, Yuuto attempts to make peace. However, they respond by attacking the Horn Clan, forcing the Wolf Clan to go to war with them. While the Panther Clan is able to surround them, Yuuto protects his forces with war wagons. To break through, Loptr has his Einherjar, Sigyn, turn his soldiers into Berserkers. He then confronts Yuuto, but Felicia holds him off long enough for Sigrun to arrive riding a camel. The camel's scent causes the Panther Clan's cavalry to flee, forcing them to retreat and ending the battle in the Wolf Clan's victory.
8	"The Kotatsu and the Empty Bellows"; Transliteration: "Kotatsu to Karamawari no Fuigo" (Japanese: こたつと空回りのふいご)	August 26, 2018
Loptr and Sigrun discus Yuuto and their loss. Meanwhile Yuuto relaxes with the gang under the newly introduced kotatsu. Effy is going to school and Yuuto discovers that she is igored. Albertina and Christina enrolls in Effy's class to find out why. Christina becomes the new queen of the class and Effy is able to make friends. Mitsuki and Yuuto wish each other a Merry Christmas and discuss presents before Yuuto's phone battery dies. Yuuto and Ingrid go to the Smithy to create handmade glass blown presents. Yuuto gives Ingrid a magatama. Loptr and Alexis plot to overthrow the Wolf Clan and Yuuto.
9	"Beautiful Moon"; Transliteration: "Utsukushiki tsuki" (Japanese: 美しき月)	September 2, 2018
In the 21st century, Mitsuki's friend, Ruri, takes her to her cousin, Saya, hoping that her knowledge of mythology might help them find out more on where Yuuto is. After hearing Mitsuki's story, Saya draws several connections between the world of Yggdrasil and Norse Mythology, with Yuuto being the "Black One" Surtr, who causes the end of the world known as Ragnarok, the Wolf Clan being the "Infamous Wolf" Fenrir and the "Massive Snake" Jörmungandr, both of whom die at Ragnarok, and Steinthor being the "Thunder God" Thor. Mitsuki later informs Yuuto about Yggdrasil's connections to Norse Mythology, after which he goes on a walk with Albertina and Christina to clear his mind. This leads him to a brothel where he meets a girl who strongly resembles Mitsuki.
10	"Cornered Wolf"; Transliteration: "Oitsumerareta Ookami" (Japanese: 追い詰められた狼)	September 9, 2018
The girl who resembles Mitsuki claims to be Leafa of the Jarl Clan and Yuuto takes her to the Wolf Clan's palace. However, she is soon revealed to actually be Sigrdrífa, the Divine Emperor of the Holy Ásgarðr Empire, the ruling power of Yggdrasil. She also reveals that she knows about the ritual that summoned Yuuto to Yggdrasil, causing him to regain hope of returning home. Later, the Wolf Clan enjoys a New Year banquet. However, afterwards, Yuuto is informed that the Lightning clan has started moving again. The two clans meet on the battlefield and, while Steinthor is able to break through the Wolf Clan's war wagons, Yuuto is able to separate him from his forces. However, at that moment, the Wolf Clan is ambushed by the Panther Clan, leaving Sigrun to face Steinthor by herself.
11	"Proof of a Great Ruler"; Transliteration: "Haō no Shōmei" (Japanese: 覇王の証明)	September 16, 2018
Facing the Panther Clan as well as Lightning Clan and being out of strategies, Yuuto decides to face them head-on after inspiring his men with a speech. Meanwhile, Sigrun is able to defeat Steinthor using a sword technique Yuuto once showed her, causing the Lightning Clan to retreat. As the Wolf Clan begins to overpower the Panther Clan, a desperate Loptr once again has Sigyn turn his men into Berserkers to get to Yuuto. The two then face off in a sword duel, with Yuuto ultimately coming out on top. However, Sigyn then uses her rune to cause Yuuto "break free" from the effects of the Divine Mirror that summoned him to Yggdrasil and fade away, leaving only his cellphone behind. He is then transported back to Mitsuki in the 21st century.
12	"A Place to Call Home"; Transliteration: "Kaerubeki basho" (Japanese: 帰るべき場所)	September 23, 2018
With Yuuto gone, the Panther and Lightning Clans seize the opportunity to strike back at the Wolf Clan. Loptr scolds Sigyn for sending Yuuto away, as he wanted to kill him with his own hands. Meanwhile, Steinthor plans to join in the fight alongside the Panther Clan. Linnea is also advised to turn on the Wolf Clan, but refuses. The Wolf Clan struggles against the combined forces of Loptr and Steinthor, with the former losing one of their strongholds. In the 21st century, Yuuto goes shopping for new clothes with Mitsuki, but has second thoughts about staying in Tokyo. When Christina informs Leafa about Yuuto's disappearance, the latter explains she is the only one who can counter Sigyn's spell and bring Yuuto back. At the park, Yuuto tries to contact the Wolf Clan through Mitsuki's phone, and Felicia takes the call. Yuuto asks her if she could summon him back to Yggdrasil, and she informs him that Leafa could, but will nevertheless respect Yuuto's choice even if he decides not to return. Ultimately, Yuuto chooses to return to Yggdrasil. Mitsuki decides to go with him. Yuuto allows her to, on the condition that she marries him. In the end, Yuuto reclaims his throne as patriarch of the Wolf Clan, with Mitsuki as his bride.

== See also ==
- In Another World with My Smartphone—Another isekai series involving a cell phone
