= If It's for My Daughter, I'd Even Defeat a Demon Lord =

Japanese light novel series

- First light novel volume cover

うちの娘の為ならば、俺はもしかしたら魔王も倒せるかもしれない。 (Uchi no Ko no Tame Naraba, Ore wa Moshikashitara Maō mo Taoseru Kamoshirenai.)
- Genre: Adventure, fantasy, slice of life
- Novel series
- Written by: Chirolu
- Published by: Shōsetsuka ni Narō
- Original run: August 1, 2014 – August 12, 2017
- Light novel
- Written by: Chirolu
- Illustrated by: Truffle (Volume 1); Kei (Volumes 2–9)
- Published by: Hobby Japan
- English publisher: NA: J-Novel Club
- Imprint: HJ Novels
- Original run: February 20, 2015 – September 21, 2019
- Volumes: 9
- Manga
- Written by: Chirolu
- Illustrated by: Hota
- Published by: Kadokawa Shoten
- English publisher: NA: Seven Seas Entertainment
- Imprint: MF Comics
- Magazine: ComicWalker
- Original run: January 23, 2017 – July 22, 2021 (indefinite hiatus)
- Volumes: 6
- Anime television series
- Directed by: Takeyuki Yanase
- Written by: Takao Yoshioka
- Music by: Kota Yokoseki
- Studio: Maho Film
- Licensed by: Crunchyroll; SA/SEA: Muse Communication
- Original network: Tokyo MX, BS11, GYT, J:COM TV
- Original run: July 4, 2019 – September 19, 2019
- Episodes: 12

If It's for My Daughter, I'd Even Defeat a Demon Lord (うちの娘の為ならば、俺はもしかしたら魔王も倒せるかもしれない。, Uchi no Ko no Tame Naraba, Ore wa Moshikashitara Maō mo Taoseru Kamoshirenai.) is a Japanese light novel series written by Chirolu and initially illustrated by Truffle until volume 2 where Kei assumed the illustration of the series. It began serialization online in August 2014 on the user-generated novel publishing website Shōsetsuka ni Narō. It was later acquired by Hobby Japan, which has published nine volumes since February 2015 under their HJ Novels imprint. The series is published in English by J-Novel Club.

A manga adaptation with art by Hota has been serialized online via Kadokawa Shoten's ComicWalker website since July 2016 and has been collected in six tankōbon volumes. The manga is licensed in North America by Seven Seas Entertainment. An anime television series adaptation by Maho Film aired from July to September 2019.

== Plot ==
Dale is a highly skilled adventurer who has made quite a name for himself despite his youth. One day on a job deep in the forest, he comes across a little devil girl named Latina who has almost wasted away. Unable to just leave her there to die, Dale takes her home and becomes her adoptive father.

== Characters ==
Dale (デイル・レキ, Deiru Reki)
Voiced by: Nobuhiko Okamoto (Japanese); Brandon Winckler (English)
An 18 year old young adventurer. While subduing demon beasts, he finds Latina in the forest and becomes Latina's adoptive father. He is a cool and brilliant adventurer, but in front of Latina, he loves her very much.
He later gains a devil's lifespan, ensuring he can live as long as Latina; a benefit of being her official protector.
Latina (ラティナ, Ratina)
Voiced by: Kanon Takao (Japanese); Ryan Bartley (English)
A devil girl found in the forest and raised by Dale. Her background is unknown. She is very honest, gentle and intelligent. She is an idol among "Dancing Tabby Cat" customers although she cannot sing very well. Ribbons are tied to hide her horns.
After she grows up, Latina informs Dale that she loves him romantically; with the two getting married and having children.
Rita (リタ・クリューゲル, Rita Kuryūgeru)
Voiced by: Manami Numakura (Japanese); Jeannie Tirado (English)
Kenneth's wife. They both run a "Dancing Tabby Cat" business. She treats rude customer adventurers well and also provides information from the "Green God's Message Board" which controls the information. She is also Latina's mother figure.
Kenneth (ケニス・クリューゲル, Kenisu Kuryūgeru)
Voiced by: Tsuyoshi Koyama (Japanese); Kaiji Tang (English)
The owner of the tavern and inn called "Dancing Tabby Cat" where adventurers gather. He is a former adventurer and Dale's longtime friend. He also now became Latina's father figure.
Chloe (クロエ・シュナイダー, Kuroe Shunaidā)
Voiced by: Yūki Kuwahara (Japanese); Corina Boettger (English)
Latina's best friend. She is a beautiful girl who is the head of the children.
Rudy Schmidt (ルドルフ・シュミット, Rudorufu Shumitto)
Voiced by: Mutsumi Tamura
Latina's friend. He is a boy who is more mature than his age and is very worried about Latina.
Sylvia (シルビア・ファル, Shirubia Faru)
Voiced by: Marika Kōno (Japanese); Cristina Vee (English)
Latina's other best friend. She has a pleasant personality and she is a little more mature than her age.
Marcel (マルセル, Maruseru)
Voiced by: Yuuki Hirose
Latina's friend. He is a chubby boy with a gentle personality.
Anthony (アントニー, Antonī)
Voiced by: Katsumi Fukuhara
Latina's friend. He is a smart boy who can learn.
Maya (マーヤ, Māya)
Voiced by: Yui Fukuo
Old Woman Venn (ヴェン婆, Ven bā)
Voiced by: Chiyako Shibahara
Helmine (ヘルミネ, Herumine)
Voiced by: Mai Nakahara^{Ep. 6 credits}
Makuda (マクダ)
Voiced by: Sayaka Nakamura
Randolph (ランドルフ, Randorufu)
Voiced by: Toshihiko Seki
Vint (ヴィント, Vinto)
Voiced by: Shiori Izawa (Japanese); Landon McDonald (English)
Josef (ヨーゼフ, Yōzefu)
Voiced by: Yūki Inoue
York (ヨルク, Yoruku)
Voiced by: Yūki Yonai

== Media ==
=== Light novels ===
No.	Original release date	Original ISBN	English release date	English ISBN
1	February 20, 2015	978-4-79-860966-9	June 20, 2017	978-1-71-835300-8
2	September 19, 2015	978-4-79-861033-7	August 22, 2017	978-1-71-835301-5
3	February 20, 2016	978-4-79-861173-0	October 25, 2017	978-1-71-835302-2
4	June 22, 2016	978-4-79-861244-7	January 10, 2018	978-1-71-835303-9
5	November 24, 2016	978-4-79-861327-7	April 7, 2018	978-1-71-835304-6
6	August 23, 2017	978-4-79-861501-1; 978-4-79-861502-8 (SE)	June 28, 2018	978-1-71-835305-3
7	February 23, 2018	978-4-79-861628-5	August 30, 2018	978-1-71-835306-0
8	February 22, 2019	978-4-79-861867-8	July 22, 2019	978-1-71-831414-6
9	September 21, 2019	978-4-79-861963-7	July 7, 2020	978-1-71-835308-4

=== Manga ===
No.	Original release date	Original ISBN	English release date	English ISBN
1	January 23, 2017	978-4-04-068786-5	May 29, 2018	978-1-62-692796-4
2	August 23, 2017	978-4-04-069369-9	October 30, 2018	978-1-62-692918-0
3	February 22, 2018	978-4-04-069681-2	April 16, 2019	978-1-64-275025-6
4	August 23, 2018	978-4-04-065046-3	October 8, 2019	978-1-64-275713-2
5	June 22, 2019	978-4-04-065766-0	April 21, 2020	978-1-64-505239-5
6	October 23, 2020	978-4-04-065999-2	June 8, 2021	978-1-64-505768-0

=== Anime ===
An anime television series adaptation was announced on February 20, 2019. The series was animated by Maho Film, with Takeyuki Yanase directing the series and Takao Yoshioka handling series composition. Miyako Nishida, Toshihide Masudate, and Kaho Deguchi designed the characters. The series aired from July 4 to September 19, 2019, on Tokyo MX, BS11, GYT, and J:COM TV. Crunchyroll streamed the series outside of Asia. Muse Communication licensed the series in Southeast Asia and South Asia. The series ran for 12 episodes. Kanon Takao performed the series' opening theme song "I'm With You", while Nobuhiko Okamoto performed the series' ending theme song "This is Yūsha, but Zannen?!" (This is 勇者, but 残念!?).

No.	Title	Original release date	Ref.
1	"The Young Man and the Little Girl Meet"; Transliteration: "Seinen, Chīsana Musume to deau." (Japanese: 青年、ちいさな娘と出会う。)	July 4, 2019	
While on a typical mission, the adventurer Dale finds Latina, an eight-year-old devil girl with a broken horn, the mark of a criminal in demon society. Latina shows Dale the skeleton of Ragu, a male devil Dale assumes was her father. Not wanting to let her die, Dale buries Ragu properly and takes Latina to the town of Kreuz to get help from Rita and Kenneth, the owners of the tavern he rents a room in. Together, Dale and Rita nurse her back to health with a bath, food and sleep. By the following morning Latina has become very attached to Dale and Rita gives her a pair of ribbons to cover her horns. After buying Latina new clothes and shoes Dale decides that despite his dangerous adventurer lifestyle and lack of experience with children he will adopt Latina as his daughter.
2	"The Little Girl Begins Her New Life"; Transliteration: "Chīsana musume, aratana seikatsu o hajimeru." (Japanese: ちいさな娘、新たな生活をはじめる。)	July 11, 2019	
While living in the forest Ragu shows Latina her first rainbow. Dale has become a highly devoted parent but is neglecting his job to spend time with Latina. Rita forces Dale to return to work while she and Kenneth babysit Latina, whose awkward attempts to help in the tavern charms the normally gruff adventurer customers. A week later Latina has begun learning human language and how to cook. Kenneth and Latina go to buy supplies but Latina gets distracted when a street magician conjures a rainbow. Dale rushes to find her while Rita mobilises Jilvester and the other adventurer customers to find her. Latina meets three young boys, Rudy, Marcel and Anthony, who accidentally make her cry and are subsequently beaten up their other friend Chloe. Latina heals Marcel's scraped knee, showing she is capable of using magic, a rare skill. As they all become friends they meet Jilvester who takes Latina to the tavern then escorts the children home. Latina apologises for causing the adventurers trouble and cries when Dale returns because she wants to stay with him and is scared of being alone again. That night she and Dale read a book with a rainbow picture.
3	"The Young Man Heads Out"; Transliteration: "Seinen, rusu ni suru." (Japanese: 青年、留守にする。)	July 18, 2019	
Dale is devastated when given a job that will take him away from Latina for several days. Dale flies there on dragon back but is so grumpy that he terrifies the pilot who inadvertently inspires Dale to get Latina souvenir candy. Dale meets his old friend, Lord Gregor, who is amazed to hear Dale adopted a devil child. Dale is asked to kill several servants of the Seventh Demon Lord as the King wants to avoid sending his own soldiers as it could be seen as an act of war by the Demon Lord. Back at the tavern Latina is depressed so Kenneth teaches her how to make shepherd's pie. Latina's friend, Chloe, visits the tavern to see if Latina plans on going to school and Rita decides to get Dale to enroll her at the local school. In the forest Dale, Gregor and other adventurers assassinate three dragons, several humans and a female demon who all served the Demon Lord. Latina's pie proves popular with customers and Jilvester is amazed at how fast Latina managed to completely charm the rough adventurer customers. After two weeks Dale finally returns home with Latina's gifts while Latina presents him with a shepherd's pie she made especially for him.
4	""The Little Girl and the Incident""; Transliteration: "Chīsana musume, sono "jiken"." (Japanese: ちいさな娘、その『事件』。)	July 25, 2019	
Latina heals an adventurer's injured arm, amazing Dale, so he teaches her several new spells. Latina attends her first day at school and makes a new friend, Sylvia, while their teacher, a religious zealot, makes her uncomfortable. During her second day in school the teacher spots Latina's horn under her ribbon, physically attacks her and begins spewing anti-demon hatred, trying to turn the other students against Latina, but her friends defend Latina while the teacher is removed by the other staff. Latina is left traumatised after learning the average demon lifespan is two hundred years, over twice Dale's lifespan. That night Latina violently breaks off her remaining horn and nearly bleeds to death until Kenneth rushes her to the temples hospital. Dale learns from Latina that she doesn't want to be a devil if it means she will outlive him and her friends. After Dale reassures her, Later on the next day he furiously visits the temple priestess and uses his considerable political influence to have the teacher fired and defrocked; this wasn't the first time an incident happened, with elves having been discriminated by her previously. The adventurers hold a party to celebrate Latina's recovery and Latina apologises for causing everyone to worry. It is revealed at the party that Latina cannot sing, though Dale still thinks it is cute.
5	"The Little Girl Is Fascinated by the Snow"; Transliteration: "Chīsana musume, yuki ni kangeki suru." (Japanese: ちいさな娘、 雪に感激する。)	August 1, 2019	
Latina learns from her classmates about birthdays and starts going to Chloe's house after school to learn embroidery from Chloe's tailor parents. Dale learns from Kenneth that he has started paying Latina a wage for working in the tavern, traumatising Dale at the idea of Latina working when he would happily buy her anything she wanted. Jillvester becomes suspicious of two men in the tavern watching Latina. Latina reveals she used her wage to buy materials and make an adventures satchel for Dale's birthday. The next day after Dale leaves for a job Latina realises Jillvester left his money bag and rushes outside to return it. On her way back to the tavern she is attacked by the two men looking to kidnap and sell her on the black market where demon children are considered rare and valuable. Remembering that Dale told her to only use attack magic if she was in danger Latina starts to cast a spell but Jillvester arrives and threatens to murder the kidnappers but is prevented by the arrival of the police lieutenant, who also happens to be Sylvia's father, and arrests the kidnappers for threatening one of his daughter's friends.
6	"The Young Girl Leaves on a Journey"; Transliteration: "Osanaki shōjo, tabi ni deru." (Japanese: 幼き少女、旅に出る。)	August 8, 2019	
Dale receives a letter from his home town of Teathrow and decides to visit and get his jacket, which he received as a gift from there, adjusted to fit his taller height. Rita becomes sick and it turns out she and Kenneth are expecting their first baby. Latina decides that she wants to go with Dale to meet his family. Needing equipment, Latina goes shopping for a knife at the weapon shop owned by Rudy's father, while Dale looks for a mages cloak for her after consulting Helmine. The two set out on their journey and Dale easily keeps Latina safe from magical beasts while Latina proves her usefulness with her support magic. Along the way, the two visit the grave site where Latina's father Ragu is buried so she can tell him everything about her new life. The two set up camp and Latina proves she is a capable cook even in the forest, for which Dale is very thankful.
7	"The Young Girl Visits a Port Town"; Transliteration: "Osanaki shōjo, minatochō e iku." (Japanese: 幼き少女、港町へ行く。)	August 15, 2019	
Dale and Latina continue their journey through the hub town of Haase before arriving at the port town of Qualle. That night, they dine at a fancy restaurant and Latina notices one of the entertainers is wearing a similar armlet to her own. Dale and Latina ask the entertainer, Glaros, about the armlet. Glaros explains that she is a devil from the country of Vassilios, ruled by the First Demon Lord, and that an armlet is traditionally given to demon children by their fathers to celebrate their birth, since it is difficult for demons to produce children. The engraving on Latina's armlet reveals that her father Ragu's full name was Smaragdi. Glaros explains she fled Vassilios after the First Demon Lord was killed by the Second Demon Lord as the country became dangerous. She further explains that there are several Demon Lords, such as Third Demon Lord of the Sea and Sixth Demon Lord of the Giants, but there are three known as Calamitous Demon Lords, the Second Demon Lord of the Underworld, Fourth Demon Lord of Plague and Seventh Demon Lord of War. As they continue their journey Dale and Latina meet a beast man friend of Dales, Josef.
8	"The Young Man Arrives at His Home Village"; Transliteration: "Seinen, kokyō ni tsuku." (Japanese: 青年、故郷に着く。)	August 22, 2019	
Dale and Latina arrive at a village of beast men for their next stop. They stay with Josef's family and Latina gets along with Josef's daughter Maya. The next day, the two enjoy a feast prepared by the beast men as they bring in two giant boars they hunted. After spending another night in the village, the two set out and Maya gets upset when Latina leaves. After evading a barrage of arrows and avoiding traps set by some soldiers, Dale and Latina arrive at his hometown, village of Teathrow. Dale explains to Latina that the main reason he returned is because his brother Yorck will marry Frida, the chief's daughter of a nearby village, Sunas. Dale introduces Latina to the family.
9	"The Young Man Attends His Brother's Wedding with the Young Girl"; Transliteration: "Seinen, otōto no kekkonshiki to osanai shōjo to." (Japanese: 青年、弟の結婚式と幼い少女と。)	August 29, 2019	
Latina writes a letter and sends it to her friends back at Kreuz. With the villagers of Teathrow preparing for the wedding, Dales's grandmother Wendelgard shows Latina to a kennel to play with the dogs. That night, Latina tells Dale how happy she is to be with him. The next day, Latina, with Dale tailing her, feeds some dried meat to a baby soaring wolf that Wendelgard showed her in the woods. Latina becomes friends with the beasts. That night, Yorck and Frida get married, and Dale tells Latina about his life before meeting her. Dale accepted the title of Reki and the job of protecting the village. In doing so he killed other people who threatened Teathrow and was not happy until meeting Latina.
10	"The Young Girl Returns to Kreuz"; Transliteration: "Osanaki shōjo, kuroitsu ni kaeru." (Japanese: 幼き少女、クロイツに帰る。)	September 5, 2019	
Dale and Latina prepare to make the trip back to Kreuz as the two say their goodbyes to friends and family in Teathrow. Before departing, Wendelgard bestows a name to Latina as while it is normally given when a villager becomes of age, Wendelgard is not expecting to still be alive when Latina comes of age. The two set out on their return trip and stop at the beastman village as Maya is glad to see Latina again. After spending a day there, the two continue their trip stopping in Qualle again with Latina buying a souvenir for Rita. Some time later, the two arrive back at Kreuz.
11	"The Young Girl and the Kitty Paradise"; Transliteration: "Osanaki shōjo to nyanko paradaisu." (Japanese: 幼き少女とにゃんこパラダイス。)	September 12, 2019	
Latina returns to school and shares her adventures with her friends, while Dale does the same with Kenneth and Rita at the tavern. After seeing a cat pass by, Sylvia tells Latina that cats gather at night in the marketplace, but she is not allowed to go there at night. Instead, Dale takes her to see Jilvester's neighbor Gojo Shihesu, who keeps several cats as pets. Having immigrated from overseas, Shihesu talks Dale into holding a festival to celebrate the growth of children, a tradition from Shihesu's homeland, and dressing Latina in a kimono. Meanwhile, the soaring wolf pup Latina befriended travels to Kreuz to see her.
12	"The Young Girl's Wish"; Transliteration: "Osanaki shōjo, negau." (Japanese: 幼き少女、願う。)	September 19, 2019	
With Rita's child about to be born, Helmine drops by as she is accompanying Dale on his next assignment that will keep out of town for a month. Latina makes a wish to grow up, putting Dale in a foul mood and leading him to drink away. That night, Helmine comes in to tell Dale to be more realistic about his devotion to Latina and to live as long as he can for her sake. On the day before Dale leaves, he and Latina make a trip to Rag's grave as he makes a promise to look after Latina as long as he lives. The next day, Dale begins his assignment leaving Latina with Rita and Kenneth. While Dale is away, Rita's child is born with the soaring wolf and Josef's family visiting the tavern to see the child, as well as allowing Maya to see Latina again. Sometime later, Dale returns to Kreuz to be with Latina.

== Reception ==
The light novel and manga series together have over 500,000 volumes in print. In 2017, the manga adaptation was ranked 17th at the third Next Manga Awards in the web category. The light novel series ranked tenth in 2018 in Takarajimasha's annual light novel guide book Kono Light Novel ga Sugoi!, in the tankōbon category.
