= Ani Tore! EX =

Japanese anime television series

- Anime De Training! EX
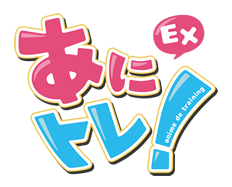

あにトレ！EX (Ani Tore! EX)
- Anime television series
- Directed by: Atsushi Nigorikawa
- Written by: Daisuke Ishibashi
- Music by: Fukai Music Factory
- Studio: Rising Force
- Original network: Tokyo MX, Sun TV
- Original run: October 12, 2015 – December 28, 2015
- Episodes: 12
- Anime television series

Ani Tore! XX!
- Directed by: Atsushi Nigorikawa
- Written by: Daisuke Ishibashi
- Music by: Yashikin
- Studio: Rising Force
- Original network: Tokyo MX, Sun TV
- Original run: October 5, 2016 – December 21, 2016
- Episodes: 12

Ani Tore! EX (あにトレ！EX), also known as Anime de Training EX, is a Japanese anime television series produced by Rising Force and Earth Star Entertainment. It debuted on October 12, 2015. It is streamed via Niconico and is also available on Crunchyroll. A second season Ani Tore! XX (あにトレ! XX), has begun airing in October 2016.

== Plot ==
The series follows six young aspiring idols as they train and teach the audience using various exercise routines.

== Characters ==
Asami Hoshi (星 あさみ, Hoshi Asami)
Voiced by: Miku Itō

Age 16. 1st year high school girl. The lead girl. Known to her friends as "Asamichi". Does very well at sports, but not too well in her studies.

Eri Higuchi (樋口 えり, Higuchi Eri)
Voiced by: Azumi Waki

Age 14. 2nd year middle school girl. A little blonde girl with pigtails who wishes she can grow her breasts like the other girls. She hates natto, unlike Asami. Before the arrival of Sakura in the second season, she was the youngest of the original five.

Shizuno Saotome (早乙女 静乃, Saotome Shizuno)
Voiced by: Miyu Komaki

Age 17. A wealthy, well-mannered girl with the temperament of a princess. She is the oldest of the six girls. She has a pet weasel, Andalucia. She chose to train and become an idol, despite her father's opposition, but she is fortunate to be among Asami and co, who have the same aspirations she has.

Akiko "Shion" Tachibana (橘 明子「紫苑」, Tachibana Akiko Shion)
Voiced by: Maria Naganawa

Age 16. Her real first name is Akiko. She is a chuunibyou girl with heterochromia iridum (different colored eyes), claiming to be the "Princess of Denebrae" and using her talent as an idol to "bring doom to the world". She worked part-time at the MINI-SPOT convenience store in the first season. In the second season, she part-times at the TOMONI convenience store near a train station. She often tries to convince her friends (and the viewers) that her part-time work is a facade. NOTE: In Episode 1 of the original series, Shion was first credited as "Convenience Store Clerk" as she appeared in a flashback of Asami's.

Yū Hiraoka (平岡 優, Hiraoka Yū)
Voiced by: Kanon Takao

Age 15. A bespectacled girl who thinks negatively and is mainly shy, but over time while training with the others, her confidence grew. She constantly ends her sentences with "desu".

Sakura Idemi (出海 さくら, Idemi Sakura)
Voiced by: Eri Suzuki

Age 14. 2nd year of middle school. The new girl. She rides a hoverboard and carries a plush toy killer whale. She talks old-fashionably and behaves like a spoiled little girl. She has a lot of toys in her room. She refers to herself as "Emperor Sakura".

Andalucia (アンダルシア, Andarushia)
Voiced by: Eri Sokabe

Shizuno's pet weasel, known to be constantly naughty around Shizuno and her friends!

Eri's Friend (樋口の友人, Eri no yūjin)
Voiced by: Yuki Nakashima

Eri's best friend from her school. She appears in Episode 2 of the second season, and for some reason, she thinks that Eri and the viewer are a couple.

Shion's Mother (紫苑の母親, Shion no hahaoya)
Voiced by: Kyoko Narumi

She appears in Episode 4 of the second season briefly to deliver a pizza to Shion and the viewers, as thanks to the latter for looking after her daughter.

== Anime ==
=== Season 1 ===
No.	Title (Note: All English episode titles are taken from Crunchyroll.)	Original release date
1	"Push-up and crunches! Bring it on!!" "Udetate fukkin! Batchi ko ̄ i!" (Japanese: 腕立て腹筋！ばっちこーい！)	October 12, 2015
Asami Hoshi teaches the viewers the push-ups and crunches, and hopes that she can eat a soft served ice cream.
2	"More push-ups! For Bigger Bra Size!!" "Motto udetate! Basuto appu nandakara!" (Japanese: もっと腕立て！バストアップなんだから!!)	October 19, 2015
Eri Higuchi, despite getting annoyed about her breast size that she tried to work on, teaches the viewers the Hindu and Reverse Push-ups.
3	"Back Squats! Go for the Japanese Beauty Look!!" "Haikin sukuwatto! Mezase yamatonadeshiko desu wa!" (Japanese: 背筋スクワット! 目指せ大和撫子ですわ!)	October 26, 2015
Shizuno Saotome, after finishing with her cooking, teaches the viewers the squats and back extension, before they can all enjoy her food.
4	"Descent of the False God! Guide Me, Darkness!" "Jashinkōrin butō (yoga)! Yami yo, ga o michibiki-kyū e! !" (Japanese: 邪神降臨舞踏（ヨガ）！闇よ、我を導き給へ!!)	November 2, 2015
Shion Tachibana, thinking that she's a "fallen angel from the world of Denebrae", teaches the viewers the "Dance of the Void" and "Dance of the Wicked", which are known as the "Bow Pose" and "Camel Pose", two poses from Yoga.
5	"Let's Dancing! Sparkling with Sweat!!" "Rettsu danshingu! Ase o kaite kirarikira!" (Japanese: レッツ・ダンシング！汗をかいてキラリキラ！)	November 9, 2015
Asami, Eri, and Shizuno teach the viewers on how to do the "Vital Exercise" dance. During the lesson, Eri suggested to name that dance company for themselves as "Eri with Dancing Flowers".
6	"Kick & Twist! Here We Go!" "Kikku& tsuisuto! Ippai ganbarude su~u!" (Japanese: キック&ツイスト！いっぱい頑張るですぅ！)	November 16, 2015
Yū Hiraoka had trouble falling asleep, so she, while teaching the viewers, does the Back Kick and the Reverse Trunk Twist exercises in order for her to go to sleep.
7	"Tough Push-ups and Squats! Don't give up!" "Hādo ni udetate sukuwatto! Makenai mo arimasen!" (Japanese: ハードに腕立てスクワット！負けないもありません！)	November 23, 2015
Asami and Eri teach the viewers the clapping push-ups and the Hindu squats. During the lesson, Eri still gets annoyed about her breast size and thinks it's a competition between her and Asami.
8	"More Dancing! Smile and Detox!!" "Moa danshingu! Egao de bi detokkusu! !" (Japanese: モア・ダンシング！笑顔で美デトックス!!)	November 30, 2015
Asami, Shion, and Yū teach the viewers the "Vital Exercise" dance, again. Afterwards, Asami decided that they should go to the store to buy the soft served ice creams, while learning that Shion works there and her real name is "Akiko", much to Shion's denial.
9	"Stretchy Stretch! Poolside Charms!!" "Nobinobi sutoretchi! Miwaku no pūrusaido!" (Japanese: 伸び伸びストレッチ！魅惑のプールサイド！)	December 7, 2015
Eri arrived at Shizuno's indoor pool, but before she can race in a pool, Shizuno suggested that they should do the warm-up exercises, by teaching the viewers on how to stretch the outer sides of bodies, the shoulders, and the lower bodies.
10	"Let's Go to the Sports Gym! Fun Exercises!" "Let's Go Supōtsujimu! Tanoshiku ekusasaizu!" (Japanese: Let's Go スポーツジム！楽しくエクササイズ！)	December 14, 2015
Asami and Yū have arrived at the sports gym, but when Yū is unsure if she can do it, Asami helps her out, by teaching her, and the viewers, on how to lift weights in the butterfly machine, work on the Synchro machine, work on the leg press, and work on the adduction and abduction machines.
11	"Easy Tai Chi! Core Strength Training!" "Yuttari taikyokuken! Taikan, kitaeru ndakara!" (Japanese: ゆったり太極拳！体幹、鍛えるんだから！)	December 21, 2015
Shion, Eri, and Yū teach the viewers Tai Chi, while Shion thinks they're performing the "Dance of Resurrection". During the lesson, Eri encourages Yū how she can make her dreams come true. After the lesson ends, Asami and Shizuno arrived. Asami and her friends thanked the viewers for keeping up with them, but they are not done yet.
12	"Vital Exercises! Smile more!!" "Baitaru ☆ ekusasaizu! Motto egao!" (Japanese: ばいたる☆エクササイズ！もっと笑顔！)	December 28, 2015
The girls will now perform the "Vital Exercise" dance, with the viewers dancing along. During the dance, scenes from the past episodes are shown.

=== Season 2 ===
No.	Title	Original release date
1	"Go for it XX! Let's Clean & Side Bench" "Iza yuke shin XX! Rettsu o sōji& saidobendo" (Japanese: いざゆけ新XX！レッツお掃除&サイドベンド)	October 5, 2016
Asami, Eri, Yū, Shizuno, and Shion are all cleaning up the new apartment "Bonheur Chateau", with the viewers helping out, in order to start their new lives together. During their clean-up time, Asami teaches the viewers the lateral side bend exercise in the lesson room. Then, a mysterious new girl arrives in front of the apartment.
2	"Running XX Train!? Training Anytime, Anywhere" "Hashiru XX densha! ? Itsu demo doko demo torēningu" (Japanese: 走るXX電車！？いつでもどこでもトレーニング)	October 12, 2016
Eri, while heading for school, teaches the viewers the invisible chair and calf raises, in a train. Afterwards, she introduces them her friend, who thinks Eri and the viewers are a couple. Soon after, they unexpectedly encounter Shion, who is working at her station while trying to hide her secret from them.
3	"Spin, Spin, Mat Exercises! XX All the way" "Maware maware, matto ekusasaizu! XX aru nomidesu wa" (Japanese: 回れ回れ、マット・エクササイズ！XXあるのみですわ)	October 19, 2016
Shizuno helps Yū do the Mat Exercises, while they both teach the viewers the two kinds of Mat Exercises: The Somersault and the Somersault Splits, in order for Yū to do well in her Mat Exercise Test on the next day.
4	"Pleasurable XX of the Void! The Beginning of the End" "Etsuraku naru yami no XX! Shūen no hajimarishi toki" (Japanese: 悦楽なる闇のXX！終焉の始まりし時)	October 26, 2016
Shion teaches the viewers the Supine Hip Lift and the Sit-ups, while trying to make them believe that she doesn't work at the station, even though she does. Soon after, she gets her message from her mother, and when her mother arrives, she gives the pizza that she bought to the viewers, to give to Shion, much to Shion's dismay.
5	"Let's Exercise! XX Stretch Out and Aim for Top Swimmer" "Rettsu jūnan! XX hogushite, mezase toppusuimā" (Japanese: レッツ柔軟！XXほぐして、目指せトップスイマー)	November 2, 2016
Back in Shizuno's indoor pool, Asami was about to train for her swimming competition at school, until Shizuno suggested that she needs to do her warm-up stretches. Shizuno then helps Asami warm-up, while they both teach the viewers how to stretch by doing the front and back bends, the invisible chair stretches, and the leg raise stretches.
6	"Shape Up on the Balance Ball. I Dub Thee My XX" "Baransubōru de sheipuappu! Yo no XX to mitomeyou" (Japanese: バランスボールでシェイプアップ！余のXXと認めよう)	November 9, 2016
Sakura Izumi, the new girl from before and who thinks she is an emperor from "The Sakura Empire", teaches the viewers, while treating them as her "noble steed", the Ball Sit-ups and the Wide Squats, even though she tried to cheat her way out of those exercises.
7	"Jogging for Breezy Aerobics! XX Feels Great" "Jogingu de sawayakana yū sanso! XX tte kimochīi ne" (Japanese: ジョギングでさわやかな有酸素！XXって気持ちいいね)	November 16, 2016
Asami and Eri teach the viewers how to jog, and during the jogging montage, one policewoman, three little girls, and a cat all jog along after Asami and Eri stopped by. Soon after, Asami, Eri, and the rest of the girls enjoy their bath time, while Eri gets more jealous when she notices that Asami's breasts grew a little more bigger.
8	"Massage Relax! Let's XX Together" "Massāji de rirakkusu! Issho ni XX shimashou" (Japanese: マッサージでリラックス！一緒にXXしましょう)	November 23, 2016
After witnessing that Yū was jogging like Asami and Eri did, Shion massages her leg to relax. Then, Sakura appeared, and while teaching and massaging the viewers, Sakura and Shion fought over Yū. When the other girls arrived to see them fighting, Yū was left no choice but to play along and becomes an evil wizard, apparently.
9	"Skip Rope Warm Up! Not Just Your Body, But XX..." "Na wa tobide pokkapoka! Karada dakedenaku, XX mo..." (Japanese: なわとびでポッカポカ！カラダだけでなく、XXも...)	November 30, 2016
Shizuno teaches the viewers how to warm up by rope skipping, both normally and crisscrossing. During the exercise, she talked about her life and having fun exercising with her friends. After they finished warming up, and Andalucía tied Shizuno up and made her fall on the viewers, they all enjoy the tea made by Shizuno.
10	"Fix Your Worries with Push-ups and Back Muscle Exercises! Give it your XX" "Udetate & haikin de o nayami kaishō! Ganbatte XX irete mimasu" (Japanese: 腕立て&背筋でお悩み解消！がんばってXXいれてみます)	December 7, 2016
Yū was concerned about using her contact lenses rather than her glasses, so in order to relax, she does, while teaching the viewers, the Unilateral Push-ups and the Prawn Back Extension. Afterwards, she accidentally bumped into Shion, making Yū drop her contact lenses, which are broken accidentally by Sakura soon after.
11	"Tighten Up Your Upper Arms with Dumbbells! XX is waiting for you" "Danberu de ninoude sukkiri! Miwaku no XX ga matte yo yo" (Japanese: ダンベルで二の腕スッキリ！魅惑のXXが待ってよよ)	December 14, 2016
Asami teaches the viewers how to work out with dumbbells. Soon after, a Christmas party is coming up, and Asami got something to say to the viewers for later. However, she is not the only one, because Eri, Sakura, Shizuno, Shion, and Yū have all got something to say to the viewers as well.
12	"Living Together! XX Is About to Begin" "Hitsuji yane no shita de! XX ga hajimaru jikanda yo" (Japanese: ひつじ屋根の下で！XXが始まる時間だよ)	December 21, 2016
After the viewers helped them finish preparing for a Christmas party, the girls have confessed their own feelings for the viewers. After that, a Christmas feast has begun, and the girls all wanted the viewers to sit right next to one of them, making the viewers pass out. The series ends with Asami waking the viewers up, like in the first episode.
