= Kandagawa Jet Girls =

Japanese multimedia project

- Anime key visual

神田川JET GIRLS (Kandagawa Jetto Gāruzu)
- Genre: Action; Adventure; Sports
- Anime television series
- Directed by: Hiraku Kaneko
- Produced by: Satoshi Motonaga; Noritomo Isogai; Shigeto Takeyama; Shogo Kosakai; Chiaki Tanimoto
- Written by: Gō Zappa
- Music by: Noisycroak
- Studio: TNK
- Licensed by: Sentai Filmworks: SEA: Muse Communication
- Original network: AT-X (uncensored); Tokyo MX, MBS, BS11 (censored)
- Original run: October 8, 2019 – January 7, 2020
- Episodes: 12 + OVA
- Video game
- Developer: Honey∞Parade Games
- Publisher: JP: Marvelous; NA: Xseed Games; EU: Marvelous Europe; AU: Marvelous Europe
- Genre: Racing
- Platform: PlayStation 4; Microsoft Windows
- Released: PlayStation 4: JP: January 16, 2020; WW: August 25, 2020; Microsoft Windows: WW: August 25, 2020
- icon

Kandagawa Jet Girls (Japanese: 神田川JET GIRLS, Hepburn: Kandagawa Jetto Gāruzu) is a multimedia project created by Kadokawa, Marvelous, and Egg Firm. An anime television series by TNK aired from October 2019 to January 2020. A racing game published by Marvelous and developed by its subsidiary Honey∞Parade Games was released in Japan for the PlayStation 4 in January 2020. A Western version of the game was released for the PlayStation 4 and Microsoft Windows in August 2020. The North American version was published by Xseed Games, while the European and Australian versions were published by Marvelous Europe.

== Plot ==
Jet Racing is a popular sport where teams of two girls work together. They consist of a Jetter, who pilots the watercraft, and a Shooter, who fires a water gun at rival teams. Aspiring to be a Jetter just like her legendary mother, Rin Namiki decides to leave her home in the countryside in order to realize her dream. Arriving in Asakusa, she meets Misa Aoi and they form a partnership. With each race, their bond grows stronger.

== Characters ==
=== Kandagawa Jet Girls ===
Rin Namiki (波黄 凛, Namiki Rin)
Voiced by: Yū Sasahara (Japanese); Kira Vincent-Davis (English)
Misa Aoi (蒼井 ミサ, Aoi Misa)
Voiced by: Riko Kohara (Japanese); Darcy Whitehall (English)

=== Dress ===
Kaguya Shijyuin (紫集院 かぐや, Shinjūin Kaguya)
Voiced by: Azusa Tadokoro (Japanese); Shelby Blocker (English)
Kuromaru Manpuku (満腹 黒丸, Manpuku Kuromaru)
Voiced by: Aya Suzaki (Japanese); Melody Spade (English)

=== Hell's Kitchen ===
Pan Ziyu (パン・ツウィ, Pan Tsui)
Voiced by: Rumi Okubo (Japanese); Nadine Russell (English)
Pan Dina (パン・ティナ, Pan Tina)
Voiced by: Naomi Ōzora (Japanese); Nadine Russell (English)

=== Unkai Surfers ===
Jennifer Peach (ジェニファー・ピーチ, Jenifā Pīchi)
Voiced by: Lynn (Japanese); Katelyn Barr (English)
Emily Orange (エミリー・オレンジ, Emirī Orenji)
Voiced by: Fairouz Ai (Japanese); Brittney Karbowski (English)

=== MKHU ===
Manatsu Shiraishi (白石 マナツ, Shiraishi Manatsu)
Voiced by: Chika Anzai (Japanese); Eileen Dover (English)
Yuzu Midorikawa (緑川 ゆず, Midorikawa Yuzu)
Voiced by: Kaori Maeda (Japanese); Jane Smith (English)

=== Suiryukai ===
Fūka Tamaki (環 楓花, Tamaki Fūka)
Voiced by: Ayaka Asai (Japanese); Olivia Swasey (English)
Inori Misuda (翠田 いのり, Misuda Inori)
Voiced by: Aya Uchida (Japanese); Holly Segarra (English)

=== Grindcore ===
Kamui Kurenai (紅衣 神威, Kurenai Kamui)
Voiced by: Yuki Matsuoka
Naraku Mamiya (真谷 奈楽, Mamiya Naraku)
Voiced by: Yūko Kaida

== Production and release ==
=== Anime ===
On July 26, 2019, Kadokawa, Marvelous, and Egg Firm announced a new multimedia project with Senran Kagura producer Kenichiro Takaki. Takaki revealed that the new multimedia project would include a planned game and anime television series. The series was animated by TNK and directed by Hiraku Kaneko, with Gō Zappa handling the series' composition, and Tsutomu Miyazawa designing the characters based on the original character design of Hanaharu Naruko. Egg Firm produced the series.

While the first episode had an advanced broadcast debut on AT-X on September 25, 2019, (Note: The first episode had an advanced broadcast debut on September 25, 2019.) the series officially aired from October 8, 2019, to January 7, 2020 on AT-X, Tokyo MX, MBS, and BS11. Yū Sasahara and Riko Kohara performed the opening theme "Bullet Mermaid", while Azusa Tadokoro performed the ending theme "RIVALS." An OVA episode is bundled with the limited edition of the game titled Kandagawa Jet Girls DX Jet Pack (神田川JET GIRLS DXジェットパック).

Sentai Filmworks streamed the series on Hidive in North America, Australia, and British Isles from 2019 to 2026 and acquired the home video rights for those regions, while Muse Communication licensed it in Southeast Asia. On February 18, 2021, Sentai Filmworks announced that the series would receive an English dub.

==== Episodes ====
No.	Title (Note: All English titles are taken from Hidive.)	Original release date
1	"The Kandagawa is Calling"; Transliteration: "Kandagawa ga Yondeiru" (Japanese: 神田川が呼んでいる)	October 8, 2019
2	"The Ace's Pride"; Transliteration: "Ēsu no Puraido" (Japanese: エースのプライド)	October 15, 2019
3	"Country Comes to Town"; Transliteration: "Onoborin" (Japanese: おのぼりん)	October 22, 2019
4	"My Favorite"; Transliteration: "Mai Feibaritto" (Japanese: マイフェイバリッと)	October 29, 2019
4.5	"Highlight Reel"; Transliteration: "Sōshūhen" (Japanese: そうしゅうへん)	November 5, 2019
5	"Pop Idol Racers"; Transliteration: "Aidoru Rēsā" (Japanese: アイドルレーサー)	November 12, 2019
6	"What They Lack"; Transliteration: "Futari ni Tarinai Mono" (Japanese: 二人に足りないもの)	November 19, 2019
7	"Why They Race"; Transliteration: "Shissōru Riyū" (Japanese: 疾走る理由)	November 26, 2019
8	"The Great Nyu-Nyu"; Transliteration: "Nyuunyuu-sama" (Japanese: にゅうにゅうさま)	December 3, 2019
9	"The 180 Jetter"; Transliteration: "Hyouhen Jettā" (Japanese: 豹変ジェッター)	December 10, 2019
10	"A Summer Gig Receive"; Transliteration: "Samā Baito Reshību" (Japanese: サマーバイトレシーブ)	December 17, 2019
11	"Rin Goes Home"; Transliteration: "Rin, Jikka e Kaeru" (Japanese: 凛、実家へ帰る)	December 24, 2019
12	"Our Jet Race"; Transliteration: "Watashitachi no Jetto Rēsu" (Japanese: 私たちのジェットレース)	January 7, 2020
13 (OVA)	"Kandagawa Jet Girls OVA"; Transliteration: "Koko Kara Hajimaru Tōkyō Gāruzu Puromōshon" (Japanese: ここから始まる東京ガールズプロモーション)	January 16, 2020

=== Video game ===
A racing game published by Marvelous was released in Japan for the PlayStation 4 on January 16, 2020. The game features shooting elements and eight courses with different variations, as well as a story mode, a free mode, and a multiplayer mode. On May 21, 2020, Marvelous and Xseed Games announced that the game would be released in North America for the PlayStation 4 and Microsoft Windows in summer 2020. On July 17, 2020, it was announced the game would be released in the West on August 25, 2020. On the same day, it was also announced that the PlayStation 4 version would receive a digital-only release in Europe and Australia.

== Reception ==
Gadget Tsūshin listed "Mijoka", a phrase uttered by Rin, in their 2019 anime buzzwords list.

== See also ==
- Kyōtei
