= Cerydra =

Video game character

- Honkai character
- Official artwork
- First game: Honkai: Star Rail (2025)
- Voiced by: EN: Rhiannon Moushall; ZH: Shi Xinlei; JA: Kanon Takao; KO: Kim Yun-chae

In-universe information
- Alias: HubRis504
- Title: Imperator
- Weapon: Polearm
- Home: Amphoreus
- Type: Wind
- Combat Path: Harmony

Cerydra (/sɜːrˈrɪdʒrə/ sir-RIDGE-ruh, Chinese: 刻律德菈; pinyin: Kèlǜdélā) is a character in the video game Honkai: Star Rail, developed by miHoYo. She was released in version 3.5 of the game on August 13, 2025. In the lore, she is the ruler, or Imperator, of the holy city of Okhema on the planet Amphoreus. During a journey into Amphoreus' past, she reluctantly aids the game's protagonist, the Trailblazer, while secretly plotting to free humanity from the control of the Titans. To rewrite the world's fundamental laws and save her people, she ultimately orchestrates her own death at the hands of her companion Hysilens, though her memories are later preserved to allow for her eventual rebirth.

Cerydra received mixed to positive reviews from critics. While her visual aesthetic sparked excitement among players, commentators debated whether her design represented Amphoreus' Greco-Roman themes. Her complex and tragic relationship with Hysilens and role as a leader were widely praised, although her gameplay was criticized.

== Design and voice acting ==
Information about Cerydra was first released on June 18, 2025, when miHoYo revealed her appearance, damage type and role in combat. They also revealed that she was adept at military tactics, having defended the holy city of Okhema from an invasion and later taking power there as the city's ruler, or "Imperator". She was also confirmed to be the demigod of law and order, and to have a love for the game of chess. Information about her combat style was first released in a promotional livestream for version 3.5 of the game on August 2. Cerydra was released in version 3.5 of the game on August 13, 2025 alongside her signature Light Cone (or weapon), "Epoch Etched in Golden Blood", although players could not actually obtain her from the game's gacha system until September 2. miHoYo released a promotional trailer for her which detailed her character backstory and personality on August 28.

Cerydra is voiced in Chinese by Shi Xinlei, in English by Rhiannon Moushall, in Japanese by Kanon Takao, and in Korean by Kim Yun-chae. In an interview, Takao said that Cerydra looks small and cute, but should not be underestimated, characterizing her as a "ruler among rulers". She felt it was as if Cerydra treated strategic maneuvering as little more than a game, adding that while Cerydra has a ruthless side to her, she also possesses strong convictions, earning Takao's admiration.

== Appearances ==
Originally created as an experimental entity, the electrical signal called HubRis504, Cerydra was originally an orphan from Hyperborea, a city-state within Amphoreus, a simulated world inspired by Greek mythology made from Data and Memoria and enclosed within a computer system. She was chosen by an ambitious nobleman to impersonate a lost princess because of her unusual hair color. Raised as a political puppet, she was forced to master court etiquette and suppress her own identity, but secretly built influence among servants, soldiers, and ordinary people. After bargaining with the Titan Talanton for golden blood at the cost of remaining physically young, she gradually turned herself from a political pawn into a powerful ruler. She built an intelligence network, raised an army, overthrew the regent who had manipulated her, and eventually conquered the city-state of Okhema with the aid of her closest companion, the Sea Siren warrior Hysilens. As the demigod of Law, Cerydra united the Chrysos Heirs, a group of heroes chosen to subjugate the Titans and obtain their Coreflames, sources of divine power required to reconstruct Amphoreus. She then launched the first Flame-Chase Journey, a campaign against the Titans intended to free humanity from their control and eventually lead Amphoreus beyond its artificial, isolated existence. Her rule brought stability and reform to the region.

The Trailblazer first learns of Cerydra as a legendary ruler from Amphoreus' past, remembered under titles such as Caesar and others. During a journey into an earlier era of the Flame-Chase, the Trailblazer and Cyrene encounter Cerydra ruling Okhema alongside Hysilens. They attempt to obtain her Coreflame of Law, (Note: Coreflames are the core of the Titans' power; when acquired by the Chrysos Heirs, they grant the ability to inherit said power.) but Cerydra refuses, claiming she still needs its power. She appears at first to cooperate with the antagonistic Lygus, who tempts her with knowledge of the universe outside Amphoreus and the possibility of using Irontomb to overthrow the Aeons. Although Hysilens and the Trailblazer initially believe that Cerydra has accepted Lygus's offer, she is actually weighing both sides while quietly preparing her own plan.

Cerydra summons two members of the Genius Society, Herta and Screwllum, in secret and helps them gain access to Amphoreus. Because rewriting its fundamental laws requires the death of a demigod, she orders Hysilens to kill her (or in the alternative, to sacrifice herself), fulfilling her longstanding belief that a ruler must be willing to sacrifice themselves just as readily as they would others. Cerydra's death allows Herta and Screwllum to reverse part of Irontomb's creation, restrict Lygus's authority, and buy the Trailblazer and friends enough time to prevent the destruction of Amphoreus. She also leaves safeguards to ensure that Amphoreus cannot simply be erased or reduced so that it would be under the control of another power before dying. This had been prophesied before; the prophecy stated in its entirety: "You shall complete your conquest in the ocean at the boundaries of this world, and eternally slumber in the sound of tides."

In the conclusion of the Amphoreus story arc in version 3.7, Irontomb is destroyed, the Scepter is shattered, and Amphoreus is reduced to stardust. The memories of Cerydra and the other Chrysos Heirs are preserved in their entirety in the book "As I've Written". Herta confirms that Amphoreus and the Chrysos Heirs are currently being reborn as real entities in the universe based on the book, emerging from the Memory Zone, but that when exactly this process will finish remains uncertain.

=== Gameplay ===
Cerydra is a five-star rarity character who deals Wind damage and walks the Path of Harmony. (Note: In Honkai: Star Rail, a Path defines a character's combat role and design philosophy. Characters on the Path of Harmony typically focus on applying buffs to allies.) She uses a polearm in combat. Her Basic Attack deals Wind damage to a designated enemy. Her Skill grants the "Military's Merit" effect to an ally character of the player's choice and gives Cerydra a point of Charge, up to a maximum of eight points. When the counter reaches six points of Charge, the "Military Merit" is automatically upgraded to "Peerage" and dispels crowd control debuffs. The character with "Peerage" increases their critical damage while using their Skill by a set percentage. Her Talent causes the character with "Military Merit" to increase their attack statistic by a set percentage of Cerydra's attack statistic; when that character attacks, Cerydra gains one point of Charge. Her ultimate deals Wind damage to all enemies.

== Reception ==
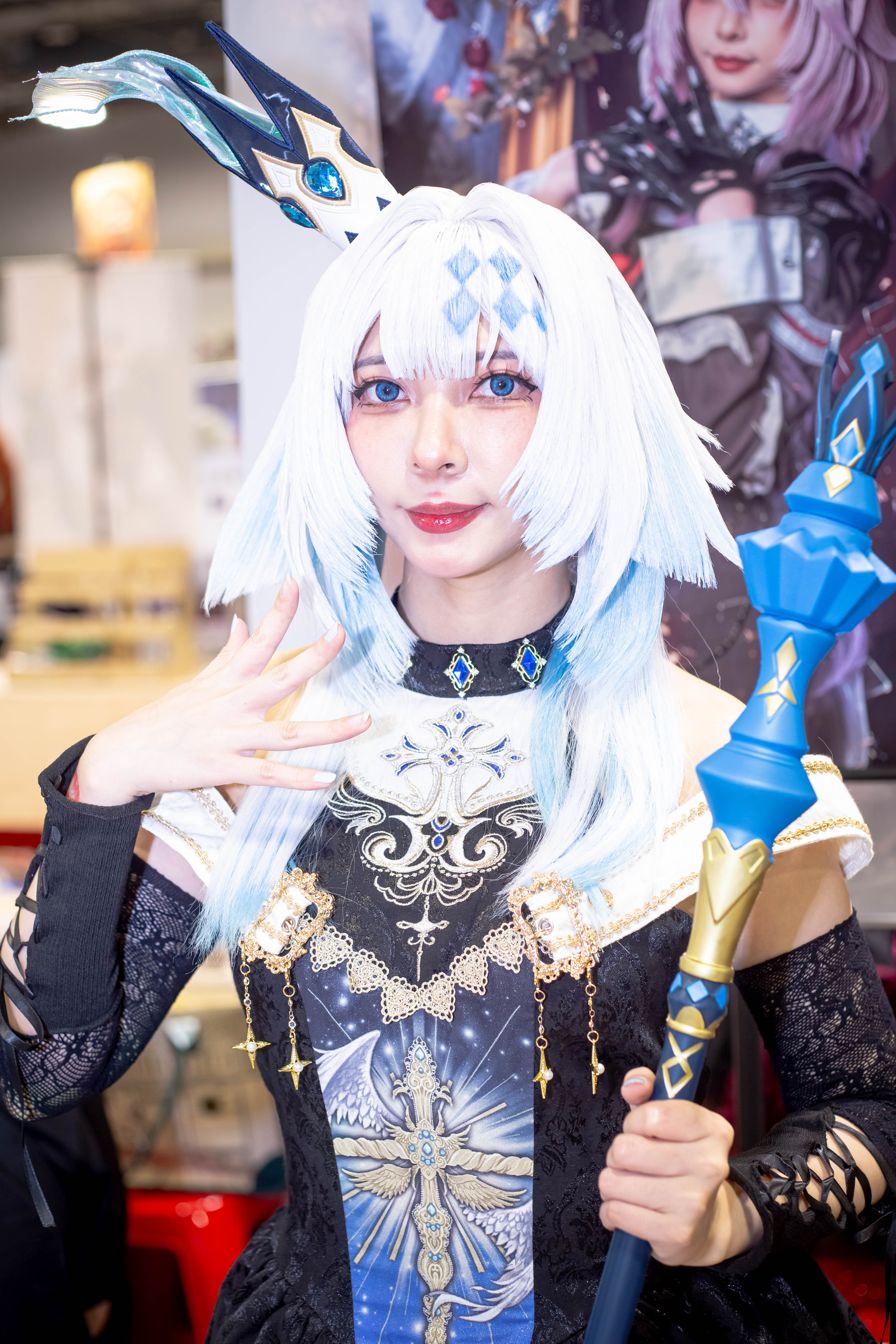
Cosplay of Cerydra

Cerydra generally received mixed to positive reviews. Fans showed their appreciation for the character via cosplay. Cerydra's visual appearance was analyzed by players and commentators. One writer for 4Gamers indicated that the reveal of her visual design sparked intense hype among the player base. Multiple commentators compared it to ancient Greece and Rome, with Marco Wutz of DBLTAP arguing that her crown-and-scepter design was coherent on its own but failed to capitalize on Amphoreus' Greco-Roman-inspired setting. He said that there were several references in the game's terminology related to her as referring to Caesar such as "Ave Imperator" and "Veni, Vidi, Vici", but followed by arguing that Roman imperial visual motifs such as a muscle cuirass, lorica segmentata, or lorica squamata would have more effectively communicated Cerydra's identity as a ruler. He considered Cerydra's actual design as generic for a monarch. In general, he characterized the designs of some of Amphoreus' characters as less pronounced in terms of the Greco-Roman elements, and believed that Cerydra "would have been the perfect reason to bring these elements back into the forefront". Yulia Shirobokova of Russian site Cybersport disagreed, saying that Cerydra's design favors a Victorian or Gothic aristocratic aesthetic. She interpreted the asymmetric cut, sharp chopped hair, and cold blue-black-white palette as a visual representation of Cerydra's coldness and need for control. Shirobokova said there was a chess theme in Cerydra's appearance, comparing her crown and scepter to a queen, which symbolizes her as the most powerful piece on the board who influences the game even after death. She has been called a tyrant as well, both by other characters and by Catherine Daro of GameSpace. Both Shirobokova and Wutz, as well as Siliconera writer Jenni Lada, compared her design to another miHoYo character, Furina from Genshin Impact, with Shirobokova speculating that both characters' story arcs might share thematic similarities. Lada, on the other hand indicated that both characters had blue as their primary color and occupy a position of power. They are both hostile towards the player character at first, and similar to Furina, Cerydra is associated with the idea of justice.

Cerydra was heavily characterized in terms of her status as a ruler as well as in terms of her relationship with Hysilens. Upon the release of Hysilens's trailer, in which Cerydra appears, Lada believed that it painted Cerydra as a villain, teasing the role of Cerydra in the story as it relates to Hysilens. She said that this was true because Cerydra, an Imperator associated with law and judgment, sends troops after Hysilens and the Trailblazer leave the ocean in the story. Hysilens and her people had lived in exile before; Lada indicates that Cerydra may have been responsible for this. Shirobokova, meanwhile, framed Cerydra as a proactive conqueror who actively sought to fulfill the prophecy surrounding Hysilens and Cerydra and seize the Coreflames from the Titans. She emphasized Cerydra's dual legacy as a strategist and lawmaker, contrasting this against her death at Hysilens's hands. Pocket Tactics writer Daz Skubich characterized her as a leader who "moves her king first" in a reference to chess, framing her authority as personal and strategic rather than simply ceremonial in nature. Kevin Felt of The Direct wrote that since Cerydra became a Chrysos Heir, Amphoreus' timeline changed dramatically, which eventually led to the wiping out of Hysilens and her people. He said that this means that when the two of them meet, he hopes they can put an end to the crisis that had taken away Hysilens's home. Bruno Yonezawa of Screen Rant indicated that both Cerydra and Hysilens play important roles in Amphoreus' lore and that they will be crucial allies for the Trailblazer there. A survey conducted by Dengeki Online indicated that voters believed that Cerydra and Hysilens have two different ideals and ways of thinking; this, they said, was even reflected in their Myers–Briggs Type Indicator profiles, which are exact opposites. One voter said that Hysilens was a very loyal subordinate to Cerydra despite their contrasting personalities, theorizing that Hysilens was deeply attracted to Cerydra's character. Another said that they were deeply captivated by Cerydra's commanding persona and tragic pride, and called the prophecy "cruel".

After Cerydra's Japanese voice actress was revealed, fans noted that she voices Sakiko Togawa from BanG Dream! Ave Mujica, while fellow Chrysos Heir Hyacine's voice actress plays Tomori Takamatsu from MyGO!!!!!, prompting jokes about a Tomori–Sakiko reunion or pairing in Honkai: Star Rail.

Cerydra's gameplay received mixed reviews. Both Yonezawa and Catherine Daro of GameSpace criticized her for lack of versatility in team compositions compared to other support characters. However, Yonezawa did praise her as a useful support for the characters she was compatible with, and said that she "excels as a complementary source of damage output". Delle Tribdino characterized her gameplay as powerful but niche, and said that her damage was decent compared to other Harmony characters.
