= Kaeding =

Kaeding is a surname. Notable people with the surname include:

- Ed Kaeding (1920–2015), Canadian provincial politician
- Nate Kaeding (born 1982), American football player
- Warren Kaeding, Canadian provincial politician

== See also ==
- Kading (surname)
- Kaede (disambiguation)
