= Umami (Hanabie. album) =

2026 studio album by Hanabie

Studio album by Hanabie.
- Released: December 2, 2026
- Genres: Metalcore; electronicore
- Language: Japanese
- Label: Epic Records Japan

Hanabie. chronology
Hot Topic (2026)	Umami (2026)

Hanabie. studio chronology
Reborn Superstar! (2023)	Umami (2026)

Singles from Umami
- 1. "Bari Bari Buddy" Released: October 8, 2026

Umami (うま味) is the upcoming third studio album by Japanese metalcore band Hanabie. The album will be released on December 2, 2026 by Epic Records Japan, a subsidiary of Sony Music Japan.

== Background ==
In July 2023, Hanabie released their second album Reborn Superstar!. It received positive critical reviews and peaked at number 26 on Billboard Japan's weekly album charts. The success of the album led to international recognition and appearances at various music festivals outside Japan. Reborn Superstar! was followed by the EPs Bucchigiri Tokyo in 2024 and Hot Topic in 2026.

On October 8, 2026, Hanabie announced their third studio album Umami. On November 7, the band revealed the cover art and track listing for the album.

== Release and promotion ==
Umami will be released by Sony Music Japan under their sub-label Epic Records Japan on December 2, 2026. From January 2025 to July 2026, Hanabie. released the singles "Tasty Survivor", "Karu Garu Everyday!" and "Life Is Short, O Brave Girl", all of which were included in the album Umami. On October 8, 2026, the band released the album's lead single "Bari Bari Buddy".

== Track listing ==
All lyrics are written by Yukina and Matsuri except where noted; all music is composed by Matsuri and Yukina except where noted.

Umami track listing
No.	Title	Length
1.	"Perfecta Matcha Day"
2.	"Edomo"
3.	"Life Is Short, O Brave Girl"	3:48
4.	"Karu Garu Everyday!"	2:42
5.	"No No Kuwazu Girai"
6.	"Uma Uma Paradise"
7.	"Bari Bari Buddy"	3:39
8.	"Hyper Omusubi Story"
9.	"Midnight Blast"
10.	"Tasty Survivor"	6:51
11.	"BBB!"

== Personnel ==
=== Hanabie. ===
- Yukina – harsh vocal, clean vocals
- Matsuri – lead guitar, rhythm guitar, clean vocals
- Hettsu – bass guitar, clean vocals
- Chika – drums
