= Sergief Island =

Island in Wrangell City and Borough, Alaska, United States

Coordinates: 56.594700°N 132.424869°W

Sergief

Geography
- Location: Pacific Ocean
- Archipelago: Alexander Archipelago

Administration
- United States
- State: Alaska
- Borough: Wrangell

Sergief Island is an island in the Alexander Archipelago, Alaska, located east of Mitkof Island and north of Kadin Island near the mouth of the Stikine River. It lies within the Tongass National Forest. The USDA Forest Service operates 2 cabins on the island.

The island was given the named Sergief by the Russian naval officers on the corvette Rynda in 1863 after one of the sailors drowned in the Sergief rapids.
