= Tasty Survivor =

Japanese single by Hanabie

Single by Hanabie.

from the album Umami
- Language: Japanese
- Released: January 30, 2025
- Length: 6:51
- Label: Epic Records Japan

Hanabie. singles chronology
"Bucchigiri Tokyo" (2024)	"Tasty Survivor" (2025)

Music video
- "Tasty Survivor" on YouTube

"Tasty Survivor" (Japanese: おいしいサバイバー, Hepburn: Oishii Sabaiba) is a single by Japanese metalcore band Hanabie. It was released on January 30, 2025, through Epic Records Japan. The title track "Tasty Survivor" was specifically composed by the band to serve as the opening theme for the anime series Momentary Lily. The single peaked at rank 24 on Billboard Japan's weekly singles sales charts.

== Background ==
Hanabie.'s song Tasty Survivor was announced as the opening theme for anime series Momentary Lily in December 2024. The song was released digitally along with a music video on 30 January 2025.

== Writing and composition ==
The music and lyrics of the song Tasty Survivor was written by Matsuri and Yukina. The band members viewed the anime before writing the song. The song is inspired by the anime and its characters as well as "band life". The intro of the song was inspired the anime's intense battle scenes. According to Yukina "From the intense eat or be eaten vibe of live band battles to the exhilarating build-up toward the chorus, it mirrors the way we warm up for a live show and the anticipation of listeners heading to the venue".

== Track listing ==
All tracks are written by All music written by Matsuri, Yukina. All lyrics written by Yukina, Matsuri.

No.	Title	Length
1.	"Tasty Survivor"	2:58
2.	"Otaku Lovely Legend (WAZGOGG Remix)"	3:53
Total length:		6:51

== Personnel ==
=== Hanabie. ===
- Yukina – harsh vocal, clean vocals
- Matsuri – lead guitar, rhythm guitar, clean vocals
- Hettsu – bass guitar, clean vocals
- Chika – drums

== Charts ==
Chart (2021)	Peak position
Japan (Oricon)	31
Japan Top Singles Sales (Billboard)	24
