= Kaede =

Kaede (楓) ("maple") may refer to:

- Kaede (protein), a photosynthetic activated fluorescent protein
- Japanese ship Kaede, several torn down ships

== People ==
- Kaede (dancer) (楓; born 1996), Japanese dancer, fashion model and actress
- Kaede Ariyama (有山 楓; born c. 1997), murder victim of Kaoru Kobayashi
- Kaede Hagitani (萩谷 楓; born 2000), Japanese athlete
- Kaede Hondo (本渡 楓; born 1996), Japanese voice actress
- Kaede Kaga (加賀 楓; born 1999), Japanese musician, ex-member of Morning Musume
- Kaede Kondo (近藤 楓; born 1991), Japanese basketball player
- Kaede Nakamura (中村 楓; born 1991), Japanese women's footballer
- Kaede Sato (佐藤 楓; born 1992), Japanese professional footballer
- Kaede, former percussionist for Japanese heavy metal music ensemble Hanabie.
- Kaede, member of Japanese idol music group Negicco

== Fictional characters ==
- Kaede, a character from Marie Lu's Legend trilogy
- Lady Kaede, the villain from Akira Kurosawa's Ran
- Kaede, a Blade Brandier from the .hack//G.U. series
- Kaede (InuYasha), supporting character of the InuYasha series
- Kaede, the main character in The Last Blade series of games
- Kaede, the female protagonist of Elfen Lied, more commonly known as Lucy
- Kaede, a kunoichi (female ninja) from the video game Onimusha
- Kaede, a female "shadow" or ninja in the video game Shadow of the Ninja
- Kaede, a character from the seinen anime Manyu Scroll
- Kaede Agano, a Neon Genesis Evangelion character
- Kaede Akamatsu, a Danganronpa V3: Killing Harmony character
- Kaede Azusagawa, a major character from the Rascal Does Not Dream series
- Kaede Furutani, a character from YuruYuri
- Kaede Fuyou, a character in the H game and anime Shuffle!
- Kaede Higa, the Red Rose-Rhode Knight from the manga Kiss of the Rose Princess
- Kaede Ichinose, a character in the anime Aikatsu!
- Kaede Ikeno, a character from the manga/anime Sakura Trick
- Kaede Kaburagi, a character in Tiger & Bunny
- Kaede Kagayama, the candy store owner from Non Non Biyori
- Kaede Kayano, a major character from Assassination Classroom
- Kaede Komura, the main protagonist of The Girl I Like Forgot Her Glasses
- Kaede Manyuda, a supporting character from Kakegurui
- Kaede Minami, a character from Mirmo! (Selfish Fairy Mirumo de Pon in Japanese)
- Kaede Misumi, of the Please Twins! series
- Kaede Mizuno, a character from Nyan Koi!
- Kaede Murenai, a character in the anime Betterman
- Kaede Nagase, a character from Negima! Magister Negi Magi
- Kaede Otori, a supporting character from Komi Can't Communicate
- Kaede Rukawa, a main character from Slam Dunk
- Kaede Saitou, a character from Angelic Layer
- Kaede Saitou, a character from Encouragement of Climb
- Kaede Sajō, a main character from The Dreaming Boy Is a Realist
- Kaede Sakura, a character from Kämpfer
- Kaede Shirakawa, the female protagonist of Lian Hearn's Tales of the Otori trilogy
- Kaede Shiranui, a character from Ninja Nonsense
- Kaede Smith, a playable character in the video game Killer7
- Kaede Takagaki, a character in the game The Idolmaster Cinderella Girls

== See also ==
- Kaede ~If Trans...~, a VHS released by Japanese rock band Dir En Grey
