= Kading (surname) =

Kading is a surname. Notable people with this surname include:

- Charles A. Kading (1874–1956), U.S. Representative from Wisconsin
- Greg Kading (born 1963), American author and former Los Angeles Police Department detective
- Jack Kading (1884–1964), first baseman in Major League Baseball
- Tom Kading (born c. 1987), American politician, business owner, and lawyer
- Walter Kading, German recipient of the Knight's Cross of the Iron Cross

== See also ==
- Kading or Kedenj, a village in Fars Province, Iran
- Kadin (disambiguation)
- Kanding
