= Natsuko Abe =

Japanese voice actress

- 阿部 菜摘子
- Born: February 9 Kanagawa Prefecture, Japan
- Status: Active
- Occupation: Voice actress
- Years active: 2010–present
- Agent: Intention
- Notable work: The Exiled Heavy Knight Knows How to Game the System as Maris Edvan; In the Land of Leadale as Lonti Arbalest; Momentary Lily as Yuri Kawazu; Tying the Knot with an Amagami Sister as Karen Matsugasaki

Natsuko Abe (阿部 菜摘子, Abe Natsuko; born February 9) is a Japanese voice actress from Kanagawa Prefecture who is currently affiliated with Intention. She participated in the open audition for the heroine of Sakugan, an anime adaptation decided under the production Project ANIMA, and she advanced to the second screening.

== Filmography ==
=== Anime television series ===
2021

- Sakugan, Female customer A
- So I'm a Spider, So What?
- SSSS.Dynazenon, Child
- My Senpai Is Annoying, Female employee and department store clerk
- Taisho Otome Fairy Tale, Reimi

2022

- In the Land of Leadale, Lonti Arbalest
- My Dress-Up Darling, Event participant
- Princess Connect! Re:Dive 2, Waitress
- Link Click, Student
- Trapped in a Dating Sim: The World of Otome Games Is Tough for Mobs, Follower
- The Greatest Demon Lord Is Reborn as a Typical Nobody, Latima
- I'm the Villainess, So I'm Taming the Final Boss, Claude

2023

- Endo and Kobayashi Live! The Latest on Tsundere Villainess Lieselotte, Club member B
- Farming Life in Another World, Lalu, Lasa, Leeta, and Leezay
- The Idolmaster Cinderella Girls U149, Classmate A
- Level 1 Demon Lord and One Room Hero, Announcement
- Horimiya: The Missing Pieces, Schoolgirl B
- The Gene of AI, Taguchi's son
- The Saint's Magic Power Is Omnipotent, Maid
- KamiErabi God.app, Chika Nojima
- My New Boss Is Goofy, Employee

2024

- Beyblade X, Rikorun
- Go! Go! Loser Ranger!, Mother and Receptionist
- Mysterious Disappearances, Girl
- The Many Sides of Voice Actor Radio, Staff member
- Train to the End of the World, Darkizumite
- Senpai Is an Otokonoko, Ryuji Taiga (young)
- Tower of God, Nya Nia
- Days with My Stepsister, Vending Machine Voice
- The Magical Girl and the Evil Lieutenant Used to Be Archenemies, Child A
- The Elusive Samurai
- No Longer Allowed in Another World, Children in an Orphanage
- Shangri-La Frontier, SF-Zoo Female B
- Murai in Love, Female Student
- Whisper Me a Love Song, Live Audience

2025

- Momentary Lily, Yuri Kawazu
- Tying the Knot with an Amagami Sister, Karen Matsugasaki
- Ishura, Daughter
- The 100 Girlfriends Who Really, Really, Really, Really, Really Love You, Fuute Ranoko

2026

- Playing Death Games to Put Food on the Table, Moegi
- Medalist 2nd Season, Yūna Yagi
- The Exiled Heavy Knight Knows How to Game the System, Maris Edvan
- Firefly Wedding, Aoi

=== Anime film ===
2021

- Jujutsu Kaisen 0, Passerby

=== Video games ===
2021

- Phantasy Star Online 2, Twilight Rune

2022

- A Man and His Cat, Kitten
- Quiz RPG: The World of Mystic Wiz, Shalom, Shalom Peace
- Kantai Collection, Ranger, Natsugumo
