= Araiguma Calcal-dan =

Japanese anime television series

- Promotional poster
- あらいぐま カルカル団
- Created by: ytv; Nippon Animation Co., Ltd.
- Directed by: Henry Hirakawa
- Music by: Arisa Okehazama
- Country of origin: Japan
- Original language: Japanese
- No. of episodes: 24

Production
- Producers: Hiroya Nakata; Kasumi Dekune
- Animator: Nippon Animation
- Running time: 1 minute
- Production companies: ytv; Nippon Animation Co., Ltd.

Original release
- Network: ytv, BS NTV
- Release: April 4 – September 12, 2025

Araiguma Calcal-dan (あらいぐま カルカル団, Araiguma Karukaru-dan; lit. 'Raccoon Calcal Force') is a 2025 Japanese short anime television series produced by Nippon Animation, and a spin-off to the Rascal the Raccoon 1977 anime series, made in commemoration of 50th anniversary of Nippon Animation. It is directed by Henry Hirakawa, with Ayano Yoshioka designing the characters and Arisa Okehazama composing the music. It aired from April 4 to September 12, 2025, on ytv and BS NTV. The theme song is "Karugaru Everyday!!" (Easy Everyday) performed by Hanabie.

== Characters ==
Acacal (アカカル, Akakaru)
Voiced by: Junya Enoki
Logical (ロジカル, Rojikaru)
Voiced by: Taku Yashiro
Subcal (サブカル, Sabukaru)
Voiced by: Kenshō Ono
Comical (コミカル, Komikaru)
Voiced by: Yōhei Azakami
Middle (ミドル, Midoru)
Voiced by: Kenjiro Tsuda

=== Support characters ===
Vocal (ボーカル, Bōkaru)
Voiced by: Akina Nakamori
