= Momentary Lily =

Japanese anime television series

- Key visual

もめんたりー・リリィ (Momentari Riryi)
- Genre: Post-apocalyptic; Adventure; Cooking
- Created by: GoHands; Shochiku
- Manga
- Written by: Reiri
- Published by: Square Enix
- Magazine: Manga Up!
- Original run: September 2024 – July 2025
- Volumes: 2
- Anime television series
- Directed by: Shingo Suzuki (chief); Susumu Kudo; Katsumasa Yokomine
- Produced by: Toshio Iiduka
- Written by: Tamazō Yanagi; Shingo Suzuki
- Music by: Ryosuke Kojima
- Studio: GoHands
- Licensed by: Crunchyroll: SA/SEA: Muse Communication
- Original network: Tokyo MX, BS Asahi, Kansai TV, AT-X
- Original run: January 2, 2025 – March 30, 2025
- Episodes: 13 + OVA

Momentary Lily (もめんたりー・リリィ, Momentari Riryi) is a Japanese original anime television series produced by Shochiku and animated by GoHands. The series premiered from January to March 2025. It received generally negative reviews from critics.

== Plot ==
Robotic invaders have wiped out all life, as a lonely girl named Renge Kasumi fights to survive using her newly discovered powers. With no memories of her previous life, she roams the city until she meets five other beautiful girls, each with their unique abilities. Together, the girls make the most of their lives, cooking delicious meals in-between their battle encounters with mechanical monstrosities. As the girls cook delicious meals and uncover the secrets of their powers and pasts, they find strength in their friendship together.

== Characters ==
Yuri Kawazu (河津 ゆり, Kawazu Yuri)
Voiced by: Natsuko Abe
Erika Kōdaiji (高台寺 えりか, Kōdaiji Erika)
Voiced by: Tsugumi Sakuragi
Hinageshi Usuzumi (薄墨 ひなげし, Usuzumi Hinageshi)
Voiced by: Shion Wakayama
Renge Kasumi (霞 れんげ, Kasumi Renge)
Voiced by: Manatsu Murakami
Sazanka Yoshino (吉野 さざんか, Yoshino Sazanka)
Voiced by: Misaki Kuno
Ayame Sakuya (咲耶 あやめ, Sakuya Ayame)
Voiced by: Miyuri Shimabukuro

== Media ==
=== Anime ===
The series is produced by Shochiku and animated by GoHands. It is directed by Susumu Kudo and Katsumasa Yokomine and written by Tamazō Yanagi, with Shingo Suzuki serving as chief director and character designer and Ryosuke Kojima composing the music. The series aired from January 2 to March 30, 2025, on Tokyo MX and other networks. (Note: Tokyo MX lists the series premiere on January 2, 2025, at 24:00, which is effectively January 3 at midnight JST.) The opening theme song is "Oishīi Survivor" (おいしいサバイバー; Tasty Survivor), performed by Hanabie., while the ending theme song is "Real" (リアル; Riaru), performed by miwa. Crunchyroll streams the series. Muse Communication licensed the series in Asia-Pacific.

==== Episodes ====
No.	Title	Directed by (Note: Production staff information is taken from the ending credits of each episode.)	Written by	Storyboarded by	Original release date
1	"Saury Hitsumabushi After the Loneliness"; Transliteration: "Hitoribocchi no Go no Sanma no Hitsumabushi" (Japanese: ひとりぼっちの後のさんまのひつまぶし)	Katsumasa Yokomine & Shingo Suzuki	Tamazo Yanagi	Shingo Suzuki	January 2, 2025 (Note: Episode 1 premiered 30 mins earlier than the original air time on Tokyo MX.)
The world has been overrun by the Wild Hunts, robotic beings that erase humans. A team of five girls, Yuri, Erika, Hinageshi, Sazanka, and Ayame, are fighting the Wild Hunts with their Andvari weapons. Elsewhere, a lonely and amnesiac girl named Renge wanders the city, believing there are no other humans around until she meets the five girls. After introductions, Renge cooks for them all. Then all of sudden two Wild Hunts shows up. Renge summons her Andvari which enables her to fly and kills the two Wild Hunts instantly. The other girls are surprised Renge has an Andvari and is so strong. Then Renge reveals she has no memories and had this strange weapons with her. The girls welcome Renge to the team, but Yuri tells her that they cannot become friends because then it would be too sad if any of them disappeared.
2	"Canned Mackerel Italian-style Tomato Hot Pot Together"; Transliteration: "Minna to Issho no Saba Kan no Itariafū Tomato Nabe" (Japanese: みんなと一緒のサバ缶のイタリア風トマト鍋)	Shingo Suzuki & Shouhei Adachi	Tamazo Yanagi & Shingo Suzuki	Shingo Suzuki	January 10, 2025
Renge shows the girls a social media post showing the city center from the previous day. Realizing there are other survivors around, they decide to check it out. Yuri tells Renge about a friend she once had named Nerine Shirayuki, who she got separated from. Renge vows to help find her. On the way to the city center, the group battle Wild Hunts. Erika runs into trouble. Renge and Yuri arrive and manage to save her from a Wild Hunt. Yuri destroys the Wild Hunt, but it kills her as well.
3	"Unforgettable Canned Crab and Canned Mackerel Chirashi Sushi"; Transliteration: "Wasure Rarenai ka ni Kan to Saba Kan no Chirashi Zushi" (Japanese: 忘れられないかに缶とサバ缶のちらし寿司)	Shohei Adachi & Shingo Suzuki	Tamazo Yanagi & Shingo Suzuki	Shingo Suzuki	January 17, 2025
As the team mourns Yuri's loss, they try to decide their next move. When more Wild Hunts arrive, Yuri's Andvari combines with Renge's, and Renge destroys the Wild Hunts with it. Renge realizes she remembers meeting Yuri before, even though that shouldn't be possible.
4	"Rich and Warm Corned Beef Miso Ramen"; Transliteration: "Nukumori Kasaneta Nōkō Konbīfu Miso Rāmen" (Japanese: ぬくもり重ねた濃厚コンビーフ味噌ラーメン)	Tetsuichi Yamagishi	Tamazo Yanagi	Shingo Suzuki & Katsumasa Yokomine	January 24, 2025
The girls take refuge in a school during a snowstorm.
5	"Wishing On Mackerel, Oyster, and Egg Zosui Soup Kuzushi Kiritampo Style"; Transliteration: "Omoi o Tsutaete Saba to Kaki no Tamago Zōsui Kuzushi Kiritanpo-fū" (Japanese: 想いを伝えてサバと牡蠣の卵雑炊 崩しきりたんぽ風)	Tetsuichi Yamagishi	Tamazo Yanagi	Shingo Suzuki & Katsumasa Yokomine	January 31, 2025
Erika and Hinageshi face off in a series of three duels, first a video game, then a race, and finally a cooking duel. Later, Renge finds a message on social media asking them if they're humans.
6	"Pool, Videos, Summer and Shanghai-style Squid Yakisoba"; Transliteration: "Pūru to Dōga to Natsu no Shanhai-fū ika Yakisoba" (Japanese: プールと動画と夏の上海風イカ焼きそば)	Shohei Adachi	Tamazo Yanagi	Katsumasa Yokomine	February 7, 2025
To prove their humanity, the girls head to a pool to shoot videos of themselves for social media.
7	"Fighting Together for Shio Musubi"; Transliteration: "Minna de Tatakau Shio Musubi" (Japanese: みんなで戦う塩むすび)	Shohei Adachi	Tamazo Yanagi	Katsumasa Yokomine	February 14, 2025
The girls finally reach the city center and make contact with other survivors. Erika reunites with her family. Renge learns of another girl who resembles her and shares her last name. Renge goes off alone to find her.
8	"Chocolate Bars Once the Rain Stops"; Transliteration: "Ame ga Yandara Chokorēto Bā" (Japanese: 雨がやんだらチョコレートバー)	Katsumasa Yokomine	Tamazo Yanagi	Shingo Suzuki & Katsumasa Yokomine	February 21, 2025
Renge meets Suzuran Kasumi, who claims to be her sister. However, she also claims Renge died protecting her. Renge starts to wonder what she actually is.
9	"Curry That Accidentally Turned Out Delicious after Adding Various Secret Ingredients While Smiling All Night"; Transliteration: "Yodōshi Waratta Kakushimi ni Iroiro Iretara Gūzen Oishiku Natta Karē" (Japanese: 夜通し笑った隠し味に色々入れたら偶然おいしくなったカレー)	Katsumasa Yokomine	Tamazo Yanagi	Katsumasa Yokomine	February 28, 2025
The team meets Suzuran and prepare to face a Wild Hunt known as Balor. They stay at a hotel to rest. Later, they find another version of Yuri.
10	"One More and a Missing Can"; Transliteration: "Mō Hitori to Tarinai Kandzume" (Japanese: もうひとりと足りない缶詰)	Tetsuichi Yamagishi	Tamazo Yanagi	Katsumasa Yokomine	March 7, 2025
The team finds a Wild Hunt facility where they meet the other Yuri, along with another Erika, Hinageshi, Sazanka, Ayame, and Nerine. Renge recovers a memory of meeting Nerine before. She realizes she got her Andvari from Nerine and inherited some of Nerine's memories from it. Hinageshi takes control of the facility's systems. The facility's AI appears in Yuri's form to talk to them.
11	"Cooking Together With the Untouchable Girl"; Transliteration: "Furenai Ano Ko to Minna de Kappō" (Japanese: 触れないあの子とみんなで割烹)	Tetsuichi Yamaichi	Tamazo Yanagi	Katsumasa Yokomine	March 14, 2025
The AI explains that all of the girls except Renge are copies created by the aliens that created the Wild Hunt, intended to replace the real humans for a plot that has since been abandoned. It reveals that humanity itself was a science project created by the aliens, who also created several other civilizations on other planets. The Wild Hunts were intended to erase humanity and record their civilization, but that order was halted. The other Yuri, Erika, Hinageshi, Sazanka, Ayame, and Nerine in the facility are in fact the real ones, while Renge is the real Renge, but was biologically altered by her Andvari and is doomed to die if she continues using it. Renge decides to cook a meal for everyone, since that's the only thing she knows is real about herself anymore.
12	"Such A Fun Full-Course Meal"; Transliteration: "Konnani Yanoshī Furukōsu" (Japanese: こんなに楽しいフルコース)	Shohei Adachi	Tamazo Yanagi	Katsumasa Yokomine	March 21, 2025
The group shares a meal together as Erika, Hinageshi, Sazanka, and Ayame bond with their originals. After sending the originals off to where the other survivors are, Renge visits her copy's grave and pays her respects. Hinageshi confirms that with the aliens' operation shut down, no new Wild Hunts are being created, so once they destroy all the remaining ones, the Wild Hunts will be gone. Despite the danger to herself, Renge takes up her Andvari one last time and destroys Balor, but then dies right afterward.
13	"Ending on an Ochazuke Buffet with Everyone Around"; Transliteration: "Minna ga Iru no Ochazuke Baikingu" (Japanese: みんながいる〆のお茶漬けバイキング)	Shohei Adachi	Tamazo Yanagi	Katsumasa Yokomine	March 28, 2025
The team fight off some more Wild Hunts that Balor had called for backup. Renge's Andvari, still operating according to her will, flies in and destroys two Wild Hunts. Erika picks up Renge's Andvari and the team battles on. Later, it's shown that their originals have met up with the other survivors. Another timid young girl is shown wandering the city until she finds the team back at their base, just as Renge had at the beginning of the series. The team fight off some more Wild Hunts to protect the girl, and then tell her that they can become friends.
14 (OVA)	"Kappou On and On"; Transliteration: "Tsuzuiteiku Kappō, Kappō!" (Japanese: 続いていく割烹、割烹!)	Shohei Adachi	Tamazo Yanagi	Katsumasa Yokomine	August 27, 2025

=== Manga ===
A manga adaptation by Reiri entitled Momentary Lily: 100 Things I Want to Do Before Graduation (Japanese: もめんたりー・リリィ〜卒業までにしたい100のこと〜, romanized: Momentari ̄Riryi 〜Sotsugyō Made ni Shitai 100 no Koto〜) was serialized in Square Enix's Manga Up! from September 2024 to July 2025. In a different timeline from the TV anime, Renge and her friends put into practice the things they wrote on their "Things to Do Before Graduation List" at school.

No.	Japanese release date	Japanese ISBN
1	January 7, 2025	978-4-7575-9606-1
2	August 6, 2025	978-4-7575-9995-6
