= Kadin =

Kadin or Kadın may refer to

- KADIN, Indonesian Chamber of Commerce and Industry
- Kadin (name)
- Kadın (title), for an imperial consort of the Sultan of the Ottoman Empire
- Kadin Island in southeastern Alaska
- Kadin Jelovac, a village in Bosnia and Herzegovina
- Kadin most, a 15th-century stone arch bridge over the Struma River in Bulgaria
- O Kadın, a 1982 Turkish romantic drama film
- Haremde Dört Kadın, a 1965 Turkish drama film
- Hükümet Kadın, a 2013 Turkish comedy film
- Kadın (TV series), a 2017 Turkish television series

== See also ==
- Khatun
- Hatun
