= Japanese ship Kaede =

Several ships have been named Kaede (楓 / かえで; "maple") :

- Japanese destroyer Kaede (1915), a Kaba-class destroyer of the Imperial Japanese Navy during World War I
- Japanese destroyer Kaede (1944), a Matsu-class destroyer of the Imperial Japanese Navy during World War II
- JDS Kaede (PF-13, PF-293), a Kusu-class patrol frigate of the Japan Maritime Self-Defense Force, formerly USS Newport (PF-27)

== See also ==
- Kaede (disambiguation)
