= Tying the Knot with an Amagami Sister =

Japanese manga series by Marcey Naito

- First tankōbon volume cover

甘神さんちの縁結び (Amagami-san Chi no Enmusubi)
- Genre: Harem; Romantic comedy Supernatural
- Manga
- Written by: Marcey Naito
- Published by: Kodansha
- English publisher: NA: Kodansha USA
- Imprint: Shōnen Magazine Comics
- Magazine: Weekly Shōnen Magazine
- Original run: April 21, 2021 – August 27, 2025
- Volumes: 22
- Anime television series
- Directed by: Yujiro Abe
- Produced by: Renta Suzuki; Kou Tachibana; Nobuhiko Kurosu; Tooru Miyakoshi; Fumihiro Ozawa; Hideo Shimazaki
- Written by: Yasuko Aoki
- Music by: Ryo Kawasaki; Tomoyuki Kono
- Studio: Drive
- Licensed by: Crunchyroll (streaming); SEA: Plus Media Networks Asia
- Original network: TXN (TV Tokyo), BS NTV
- Original run: October 2, 2024 – March 26, 2025
- Episodes: 24
- icon

Tying the Knot with an Amagami Sister (Japanese: 甘神さんちの縁結び, Hepburn: Amagami-san Chi no Enmusubi; lit. 'Matchmaking of the Amagami Household') is a Japanese manga series written and illustrated by Marcey Naito. It was originally published as a one-shot in Kodansha's Weekly Shōnen Magazine in December 2020, before serialized in the same magazine from April 2021 to August 2025. An anime television series adaptation produced by Drive aired from October 2024 to March 2025.

== Plot ==
The series follows Uryū Kamihate, a high school student who is aiming to pass the entrance exams to the Kyoto University's medical school. After living in an orphanage for much of his life following the death of his mother, he comes to live at Amagami Shrine, where the head priest asks him to marry one of his three granddaughters. Uryū and the Amagami sisters also have to contend with various issues, such as the shrine being in danger of closing down due to financial issues. Through flashforwards, it is implied that Uryū will eventually marry one of the sisters, even though he does not want to at all, and actively tries to avoid it at all costs.

== Characters ==
Uryū Kamihate (上終 瓜生, Kamihate Uryū)
Voiced by: Sōnosuke Hattori (voice comic), Ryōta Suzuki (anime) (Japanese); Branden Loera (English)
A high school student aiming to enter Kyoto University's medical school. He was inspired to become a doctor after his mother's death. Despite being engrossed in studying most of the time, he managed to bond with the Amagami siblings in spite of their rough start and is destined to marry one of the siblings in order to continue the legacy of Amagami Shrine. Because he believes that God did not answer his prayers for his mother to get better, he initially does not believe in spirituality or religion, and hates the idea of relationships and having a significant other. Initially, he has no romantic feelings for any of the girls at all, and refuses to marry any of them, wanting to get away from them and the shrine as soon as possible. However, he eventually warms up to the girls and starts treating them better. He's very capable of doing household chores and cooking which the Amagami siblings adore very much. A frequent running gag of Uryu revolves around him getting caught in awkward situation where the Amagami siblings, Yuna in particular, keep on chiding him for being perverse.
Yae Amagami (甘神 夜重, Amagami Yae)
Voiced by: Miyu Tsuji (voice comic), Ai Kayano (PV1), Reina Ueda (PV2), Sumire Uesaka (anime) (Japanese); Monica Rial (English)
The eldest daughter and an art major at a university with a playful personality. It is later revealed that she was actually adopted into the Amagami family and that her birth name is Reiko Ichijōji (一乗寺 澪子, Ichijōji Reiko). She has had a crush on Uryū since their short encounter few years ago, even though he does not reciprocate at all. Uryu's encouragement at the time led her to become more decisive and more carefree which allowed her to leave her dark childhood behind which helps shape her current personality.
Yuna Amagami (甘神 夕奈, Amagami Yuna)
Voiced by: Miyu Tsuji (voice comic), Sora Amamiya (PV1), Rie Takahashi (PV2), Kaede Hondo (anime) (Japanese); Hayden Daviau (English)
The second sister, who has a tsundere personality. She excels academically despite having a poor command of English. She strives to preserve the legacy of the Amagami Shrine. She likes cats. Her birth name is Nadeshiko Kurama (鞍馬 撫子, Kurama Nadeshiko).
Asahi Amagami (甘神 朝姫, Amagami Asahi)
Voiced by: Miyu Tsuji (voice comic), Ayane Sakura (PV1), Ayana Taketatsu (PV2), Shion Wakayama (anime) (Japanese); Abigail Blythe (English)
The youngest sister, who is a member of her school's track-and-field club. She is a mature middle school scholar despite her age. However, she has a complex about her small breasts. She fell in love with Uryū after the incident involving a time loop. It is later revealed that she too was adopted into the Amagami family and that she was born Miyuki Kiyomizu (清水 美雪, Kiyomizu Miyuki).
Chidori Amagami (甘神 千鳥, Amagami Chidori)
Voiced by: Sōnosuke Hattori (voice comic), Bin Shimada (anime) (Japanese); Kenny Green (English)
The grandfather of the Amagami sisters and the chief priest of Amagami Shrine, who started caring for the sisters after the death of their mother.
Mahiru Anekōji (姉小路 舞昼, Anekōji Mahiru)
Voiced by: Nana Mizuki
A doctor and the dormitory mother at the orphanage where Uryū used to stay at. She was the one who encouraged Uryū to stay at the Amagami Shrine.
Yomiko Tsukigami (月神 読子, Tsukigami Yomiko)
Voiced by: Yui Horie
A senior priestess at the Tsukigami Shrine and a mentor to the Amagami sisters.
Shirahi Tsuruyama (鶴山 白日, Tsuruyama Shirahi)
Voiced by: Chika Anzai
Uryu's childhood friend from the orphanage who shares his dream of entering Kyoto University's medical school. She has been in love with Uryu ever since the day she first met him at the orphanage, even though Uryuu has never reciprocated at all, and is dismayed by his newfound relationship with the Amagami sisters, wanting to get rid of them and have Uryuu all to herself. However, Uryu eventually rejects her and helps her realize her mistake, which leads to her mending her relationship with the girls and becoming a temporary maiden at the shrine.
Miemon Kitashirakawa (北白川 巳右衛門, Kitashirakawa Miemon)
Voiced by: Kōji Yusa
Mitsuko Umenoki (梅ノ木 みつ子, Umenoki Mitsuko)
Voiced by: Ayasa Itō
Yuna and Uryū's classmate, and Yuna's friend. Her hairstyle resembles a dango, a reference to her family's shop.
Makoto Takeda (竹田 真, Takeda Makoto)
Voiced by: Haruka Shiraishi
Karen Matsugazaki (松ヶ崎 花蓮, Matsugazaki Karen)
Voiced by: Natsuko Abe

== Media ==
=== Manga ===
Tying the Knot with an Amagami Sister is written and illustrated by Marcey Naito, who had previously worked as assistant under Negi Haruba on The Quintessential Quintuplets. It was originally published as a one-shot in Kodansha's shōnen manga magazine Weekly Shōnen Magazine on December 2, 2020, as part of a competition with three other one-shots where readers could vote on which would be serialized. It received the most votes among readers, and serialized in the same magazine from April 21, 2021, to August 27, 2025. To promote the manga, a voiced comic video was released on Weekly Shōnen Magazine's official YouTube channel on April 8, 2021. Kodansha has collected its chapters into individual tankōbon volumes. The first volume was released on July 16, 2021; advertisements featuring Ai Kayano, Sora Amamiya, and Ayane Sakura were released to commemorate the release of the first volume. The 22nd and final volume was released on October 17, 2025.

The series is licensed in English digitally by Kodansha USA. During their panel at Anime NYC 2022, Kodansha USA announced a print release for Fall 2023.

==== Volumes ====
No.	Original release date	Original ISBN	English release date	English ISBN
1	July 16, 2021	978-4-06-524041-0	February 1, 2022 (digital); October 17, 2023 (print)	978-1-64-651854-8
1. "A Miraculous Beginning" (奇跡のはじまり, Kiseki no Hajimari); 2. "Stringing Cranes at Mid-Day" (白昼と鶴, Hakuchū to Tsuru); 3. "Lacing Shoes in the Morning" (朝の靴紐, Asa no Kutsu-himo); 4. "Cat's Cradle in the Evening" (夕焼けの猫, Yūyake no Neko); 5. "Tying the Fox Mast at Night" (夜と狐, Yoru to Kitsune)
2	September 17, 2021	978-4-06-524831-7	March 29, 2022 (digital); December 5, 2023 (print)	978-1-64-651855-5
6. "The Amagami Shrine Festival (Part One)" (甘神神社例大祭 其の一, Amagami-jinja Rei-taisai So no Ichi); 7. "The Amagami Shrine Festival (Part Two)" (甘神神社例大祭 其の二, Amagami-jinja Rei-taisai So no Ni); 8. "The Amagami Shrine Festival (Part Three)" (甘神神社例大祭 其の三, Amagami-jinja Rei-taisai So no San); 9. "The Amagami Shrine Festival (Part Four)" (甘神神社例大祭 其の四, Amagami-jinja Rei-taisai So no Shi); 10. "The Amagami Shrine Festival (Part Five)" (甘神神社例大祭 其の五, Amagami-jinja Rei-taisai So no Go); 11. "The Amagami Shrine Festival (Final Part)" (甘神神社例大祭 其の終, Amagami-jinja Rei-taisai So no Owari); 12. "Morning Races to Night" (朝は夜に馳せる, Asa wa Yoru ni Haseru); 13. "Nightfall's Gift" (薄暮の贈りもの, Hakubo no Okuri Mono); 14. "From Day to Evening" (昼から夕方にかけて, Hiru kara Yūgata ni Kakete)
3	November 17, 2021	978-4-06-525934-4	May 3, 2022 (digital); February 6, 2024 (print)	978-1-64-651856-2
15. "Dreams, the Moon, and More Dreams (Part One)" (夢と月と夢 其の一, Yume to Tsuki to Yume So no Ichi); 16. "Dreams, the Moon, and More Dreams (Part Two)" (夢と月と夢 其の二, Yume to Tsuki to Yume So no Ni); 17. "Dreams, the Moon, and More Dreams (Part Three)" (夢と月と夢 其の三, Yume to Tsuki to Yume So no San); 18. "Dreams, the Moon, and More Dreams (Part Four)" (夢と月と夢 其の四, Yume to Tsuki to Yume So no Shi); 19. "Dreams, the Moon, and More Dreams (Part Five)" (夢と月と夢 其の五, Yume to Tsuki to Yume So no Go); 20. "Dreams, the Moon, and More Dreams (Part Six)" (夢と月と夢 其の六, Yume to Tsuki to Yume So no Roku); 21. "Dreams, the Moon, and More Dreams (Part Seven)" (夢と月と夢 其の七, Yume to Tsuki to Yume So no Shichi); 22. "Dreams, the Moon, and More Dreams (Part Eight)" (夢と月と夢 其の八, Yume to Tsuki to Yume So no Hachi); 23. "Dreams, the Moon, and More Dreams (Part Nine)" (夢と月と夢 其の九, Yume to Tsuki to Yume So no Kyū)
4	February 17, 2022	978-4-06-526899-5	August 23, 2022 (digital); April 2, 2024 (print)	978-1-64-651857-9
24. "Dreams, the Moon, and More Dreams (What Comes Before)" (夢と月と夢 其の昔, Yume to Tsuki to Yume So no Mukashi); 25. "Dreams, the Moon, and More Dreams (What Comes Next)" (夢と月と夢 其の先, Yume to Tsuki to Yume So no Saki); 26. "Dreams, the Moon, and More Dreams (What Comes Now)" (夢と月と夢 其の儘, Yume to Tsuki to Yume So no Mama); 27. "New Look, New You" (衣替え、心替え, Koromo-gae, Kokoro-gae); 28. "The Problem With Packing a Lunch" (黒一点とお弁当, Koku-itten to Obentō); 29. "A Night of Drinking" (夜に酔いしれる, Yoru ni Yoi Shireru); 30. "Guardianship in the Morning" (朝を見守る会, Asa o Mi Mamoru Kai); 31. "Toying With Fate" (おみくじの悪戯, Omikuji no Itazura); 32. "The Name of the Lost" (迷子の名前, Maigo no Namae)
5	May 17, 2022	978-4-06-527924-3	November 1, 2022 (digital); June 4, 2024 (print)	978-1-64-651858-6
33. "The Truth of Late Nights-Beginning" (夜ふかしの正体 序, Yofukashi no Shōtai Jo); 34. "The Truth of Late Nights-Longing" (夜ふかしの正体 憧, Yofukashi no Shōtai Akogare); 35. "The Truth of Late Nights-Release" (夜ふかしの正体 放, Yofukashi no Shōtai Hanatsu); 36. "The Truth of Late Nights-Challenge" (夜ふかしの正体 争, Yofukashi no Shōtai Arasoi); 37. "The Truth of Late Nights-Falling" (夜ふかしの正体 転, Yofukashi no Shōtai Korogaru); 38. "The Truth of Late Nights-Origin" (夜ふかしの正体 初, Yofukashi no Shōtai Hajimari); 39. "The Truth of Late Nights-Connection" (夜ふかしの正体 縁, Yofukashi no Shōtai Tsunagari); 40. "The Truth of Late Nights-Love" (夜ふかしの正体 恋, Yofukashi no Shōtai Koi); 41. "A New Silent Comedy Show" (無声の新喜劇, Musei no Shin-kigeki)
6	July 15, 2022	978-4-06-528496-4	January 24, 2023 (digital); August 6, 2024 (print)	978-1-64-651859-3
42. "Wishes Balanced on the Scale-Beginning" (願いをのせた天秤 序, Negai o Nose ta Tenbin Jo); 43. "Wishes Balanced on the Scale-Circuit" (願いをのせた天秤 廻, Negai o Nose ta Tenbin Mawaru); 44. "Wishes Balanced on the Scale-Repeat" (願いをのせた天秤 戻, Negai o Nose ta Tenbin Modoru); 45. "Wishes Balanced on the Scale-Choice" (願いをのせた天秤 択, Negai o Nose ta Tenbin Erabu); 46. "Wishes Balanced on the Scale-Desire" (願いをのせた天秤 望, Negai o Nose ta Tenbin Nozomu); 47. "Wishes Balanced on the Scale-Decision" (願いをのせた天秤 決, Negai o Nose ta Tenbin Kimeru); 48. "Wishes Balanced on the Scale-Return" (願いをのせた天秤 帰, Negai o Nose ta Tenbin Kaeru); 49. "Wishes Balanced on the Scale-Confession" (願いをのせた天秤 伝, Negai o Nose ta Tenbin Tsutaeru); 50. "The Guiding Fire" (送り火と, Okuri-bi to)
7	September 16, 2022	978-4-06-529127-6	March 7, 2023 (digital); October 8, 2024 (print)	978-1-64-651929-3
51. "Parting Before the Gods" (神様との別れ, Kami-sama to no Wakare); 52. "Vowing Before the Gods" (神様の契り, Kami-sama to no Chigiri); 53. "Averting One's Gaze" (目線をそらして, Mesen o Sorashi te); 54. "Fever Dreams" (熱と白昼夢, Netsu to Hakuchūmu); 55. "Analysis Paralysis" (選択問題, Sentaku Mondai); 56. "The Maiden's Hide and Seek-Beginning" (撫子のかくれんぼ 序, Nadeshiko no Kakurenbo Jo); 57. "The Maiden's Hide and Seek-Swap" (撫子のかくれんぼ 換, Nadeshiko no Kakurenbo Kawaru); 58. "The Maiden's Hide and Seek-Distress" (撫子のかくれんぼ 懊, Nadeshiko no Kakurenbo Nayamu); 59. "The Maiden's Hide and Seek-Practice" (撫子のかくれんぼ 通, Nadeshiko no Kakurenbo Kayō)
8	December 16, 2022	978-4-06-529935-7	May 2, 2023 (digital); February 11, 2025 (print)	978-1-68-491930-7
60. "The Maiden's Hide and Seek-Hiding" (撫子のかくれんぼ 陰, Nadeshiko no Kakurenbo Kakusu); 61. "The Maiden's Hide and Seek-Seeking" (撫子のかくれんぼ 捜, Nadeshiko no Kakurenbo Sagasu); 62. "The Maiden's Hide and Seek-Finding" (撫子のかくれんぼ 見, Nadeshiko no Kakurenbo Mitsuke ta); 63. "The Maiden's Hide and Seek-Revealing" (撫子のかくれんぼ 現, Nadeshiko no kakurenbo Arawareru); 64. "The Maiden's Valor" (大和、撫子、武る, Yamato, Nadeshiko, Takeru); 65. "The Maiden's Night" (撫子祭 夜の部, Nadeshiko-matsuri Yoru no Bu); 66. "The Maiden's Morning" (撫子祭 朝の部, Nadeshiko-matsuri Asa no Bu); 67. "The Maiden's Hide and Seek-Captivation" (撫子のかくれんぼ 惹, Nadeshiko no Kakurenbo Hikareru); 68. "A Feast of Information" (情報の多い宴, Jōhō no Ōi Utage)
9	March 16, 2023	978-4-06-530972-8	July 4, 2023 (digital); April 15, 2025 (print)	979-8-88-933029-5
69. "A New Place and an Old Friend" (新天地と再会, Shin-tenchi to Saikai); 70. "Ulterior Motives" (思惑の勉強会, Omowaku no Benkyō-kai); 71. "The Healing Songstress" (ゆらぎの歌姫, Yuragi no Uta-hime); 72. "A Wish From the Dark" (暗闇の願いごと, Kurayami no Negai-goto); 73. "Glipses of the Other Side" (向こう側の景色, Mukō-gawa no Keshiki); 74. "Daylight Mirage-Beginning" (白日の逃げ水 序, Hakujitsu no Nige-mizu Jo); 75. "Daylight Mirage-Differences" (白日の逃げ水 異, Hakujitsu no Nige-mizu Kotonaru); 76. "Daylight Mirage-Ties" (白日の逃げ水 繋, Hakujitsu no Nige-mizu Tsunagari); 77. "Daylight Mirage-Sendoff" (白日の逃げ水 還, Hakujitsu no Nige-mizu Kaesu)
10	May 17, 2023	978-4-06-531607-8	September 5, 2023 (digital); June 10, 2025 (print)	979-8-88-933136-0
78. "Daylight Mirage-Sentiment" (白日の逃げ水 想, Hakujitsu no Nige-mizu Omoi); 79. "Daylight Mirage-Conversation" (白日の逃げ水 話, Hakujitsu no Nige-mizu Hanasu); 80. "Daylight Mirage-Feeling" (白日の逃げ水 思, Hakujitsu no Nige-mizu Omō); 81. "Daylight Mirage-Worlds" (白日の逃げ水 世, Hakujitsu no Nige-mizu Yo no Naka); 82. "Daylight Mirage-Split" (白日の逃げ水 別, Hakujitsu no Nige-mizu Wakatsu); 83. "Daylight Mirage-Entwining" (白日の逃げ水 結, Hakujitsu no Nige-mizu Musubu); 84. "A Comedy of Errors" (勘違いの新喜劇, Kan-chigai no Shin-kigeki); 85. "The Case of the Flying Bra" (空飛ぶブラジャー, Sora Tobu Burajā); 86. "A Dazzling Morning" (眩しい朝, Mabushii Asa)
11	July 14, 2023	978-4-06-532190-4	December 5, 2023 (digital); August 12, 2025 (print)	979-8-88-933285-5
87. "A Grouchy Evening" (気難しい夕暮れ, Ki-muzukashii Yū-gure); 88. "A Wonderful Night" (素敵な夜, Sutekina Yoru); 89. "A Sympathetic Voice" (思いやりの昼, Omoi Yari no Hiru); 90. "Morning's Course" (朝の道, Asa no Michi); 91. "Evening's Course" (夕の道, Yū no Michi); 92. "Night's Course" (夜の道, Yoru no Michi); 93. "Three Paths Forward (Part One)" (進路の三ツ辻 其の一, Shinro no Mi-tsu Tsuji So no Ichi); 94. "Three Paths Forward (Part Two)" (進路の三ツ辻 其のニ, Shinro no Mi-tsu Tsuji So no Ni); 95. "Three Paths Forward (Part Three)" (進路の三ツ辻 其の三, Shinro no Mi-tsu Tsuji So no San)
12	October 17, 2023	978-4-06-532894-1	March 5, 2024 (digital); October 14, 2025 (print)	979-8-88-933408-8
96. "Three Paths Forward (Part 4)" (進路の三ツ辻 其の四, Shinro no Mi-tsu Tsuji So no Shi); 97. "Three Paths Forward (Part 5)" (進路の三ツ辻 其の五, Shinro no Mi-tsu Tsuji So no Go); 98. "Three Paths Forward (Part 6)" (進路の三ツ辻 其の六, Shinro no Mi-tsu Tsuji So no Roku); 99. "Three Paths Forward (Part 7)" (進路の三ツ辻 其の七, Shinro no Mi-tsu Tsuji So no Shichi); 100. "Three Paths Forward (Part 8)" (進路の三ツ辻 其の八, Shinro no Mi-tsu Tsuji So no Hachi); 101. "Three Paths Forward (Part 9)" (進路の三ツ辻 其の九, Shinro no Mi-tsu Tsuji So no Kyū); 102. "Three Paths Forward (Part 10)" (進路の三ツ辻 其の十, Shinro no Mi-tsu Tsuji So no Jū); 103. "Three Paths Forward (Part 11)" (進路の三ツ辻 其の十一, Shinro no Mi-tsu Tsuji So no Jūichi); 104. "Three Paths Forward (Part 12)" (進路の三ツ辻 其の十二, Shinro no Mi-tsu Tsuji So no Jūni)
13	December 15, 2023	978-4-06-533897-1	May 7, 2024 (digital); December 16, 2025 (print)	979-8-88-933485-9
105. "Three Paths Forward (Final Part)" (進路の三ツ辻 其の終, Shinro no Mi-tsu Tsuji So no Owari); 106. "A New Costumed Comedy Show" (仮装の新喜劇, Kasō no Shin-kigeki); 107. "A New Perspective" (心機一転と出会い, Shinki-itten to Deai); 108. "A Fountain of Energy" (活力の源, Katsuryoku no Minamoto); 109. "The Ephemeral Blossoms" (泡沫の散り菊, Utakata no Chiri-giku); 110. "Hear No Evil, Speak No Evil" (聞かざる、言わざる, Kika zaru, Iwa zaru); 111. "The Fortune of the Unchosen" (余り茶に福あり, Amari-cha ni Fuku Ari); 112. "The Guardian Dog of the Shrine" (阿形の狛犬, Agyō no Koma-inu); 113. "The Other Guardian Dog of the Shrine" (吽形の狛犬, Ungyō no Koma-inu)
14	March 15, 2024	978-4-06-534878-9	July 2, 2024 (digital); February 17, 2026 (print)	979-8-88-933619-8
114. "Three Sides of the Genius" (才人三面相, Saijin San-mensō); 115. "The Strange Tale of the Lunatic" (狂人怪奇譚, Kyōjin Kaiki-tan); 116. "The Chill of the Ice Maiden" (情人寒冷期, Jōjin Kanrei-ki); 117. "Colorful Memories of Years Gone By" (千秋の匂い, Senshū no Nioi); 118. "Four Children of the Dragon" (竜生四子, Ryū-sei Yon-shi); 119. "Encounters on the Slope" (人と人との坂道, Hito to Hito to no Sakamichi); 120. "Together in the Rain" (雨と一緒に, Ame to Issho ni); 121. "The Red Stamp of Happiness" (幸せの朱い印, Shiawase no Akai Shirushi); 122. "More Passionate than Forever" (永遠よりも熱い, Eien Yori mo Atsui)
15	June 17, 2024	978-4-06-535785-9	November 5, 2024 (digital)	979-8-89-478158-7
123. "Dreams of a White Coat" (白衣と憧れ, Hakui to Akogare); 124. "Now and Forever (Part 1)" (今今と永遠 其の一, Ima-ima to Eien So no Ichi); 125. "Now and Forever (Part 2)" (今今と永遠 其の二, Ima-ima to Eien So no Ni); 126. "Now and Forever (Part 3)" (今今と永遠 其の三, Ima-ima to Eien So no San); 127. "Now and Forever (Part 4)" (今今と永遠 其の四, Ima-ima to Eien So no Shi); 128. "Now and Forever (Part 5)" (今今と永遠 其の五, Ima-ima to Eien So no Go); 129. "Now and Forever (Part 6)" (今今と永遠 其の六, Ima-ima to Eien So no Roku); 130. "Now and Forever (Part 7)" (今今と永遠 其の七, Ima-ima to Eien So no Shichi); 131. "Now and Forever (Part 8)" (今今と永遠 其の八, Ima-ima to Eien So no Hachi)
16	August 16, 2024	978-4-06-536522-9	January 7, 2025 (digital)	979-8-89-478308-6
132. "Now and Forever (Part 9)" (今今と永遠 其の九, Ima-ima to Eien So no Kyū); 133. "Now and Forever (Part 10)" (今今と永遠 其の十, Ima-ima to Eien So no Jū); 134. "Now and Forever (Part 11)" (今今と永遠 其の十一, Ima-ima to Eien So no Jūichi); 135. "Now and Forever (Part 12)" (今今と永遠 其の十二, Ima-ima to Eien So no Jūni); 136. "Now and Forever (Part 13)" (今今と永遠 其の十三, Ima-ima to Eien So no Jūsan); 137. "Now and Forever (Part 14)" (今今と永遠 其の十四, Ima-ima to Eien So no Jūshi); 138. "Now and Forever (Part 15)" (今今と永遠 其の十五, Ima-ima to Eien So no Jūgo); 139. "Now and Forever (Part 16)" (今今と永遠 其の十六, Ima-ima to Eien So no Jūroku); 140. "Now and Forever (Part 17)" (今今と永遠 其の十七, Ima-ima to Eien So no Jūshichi)
17	October 17, 2024	978-4-06-537132-9	March 4, 2025 (digital)	979-8-89-478428-1
141. "Now and Forever (Part 18)" (今今と永遠 其の十八, Ima-ima to Eien So no Jūhachi); 142. "Now and Forever (Part 19)" (今今と永遠 其の十九, Ima-ima to Eien So no Jūkyū); 143. "Now and Forever (Part 20)" (今今と永遠 其の二十, Ima-ima to Eien So no Nijū); 144. "Now and Forever (Part 21)" (今今と永遠 其の二十一, Ima-ima to Eien So no Nijūichi); 145. "Now and Forever (Part 22)" (今今と永遠 其の二十二, Ima-ima to Eien So no Nijūni); 146. "Now and Forever (The End)" (今今と永遠 其の終, Ima-ima to Eien So no Owari); 147. "Holy Night Disappointment" (聖なる夜の後, Seinaru Yoru no Ato); 148. "Hand-Holding For a Second Time" (ニ度目の手のひら, Ni-do-me no Te no Hira); 149. "Angels in White Robes" (白衣の天使たち, Hakui no Tenshi-tachi)
18	January 17, 2025	978-4-06-538067-3	May 6, 2025 (digital)	979-8-89-478520-2
150. "The Power of Continuous Effort" (継続の力なり, Keizoku no Chikara Nari); 151. "The Demon of Drunkenness" (酒呑童大人, Shuten-dō Otona); 152. "Meanwhile..." (一方、その頃, Ippō, So no Koro); 153. "Year's End Through the Mirror (Part 1)" (鏡の中の年の暮れ 其の一, Kagami no Naka no Toshi no Kure So no Ichi); 154. "Year's End Through the Mirror (Part 2)" (鏡の中の年の暮れ 其の二, Kagami no Naka no Toshi no Kure So no Ni); 155. "Year's End Through the Mirror (Part 3)" (鏡の中の年の暮れ 其の三, Kagami no Naka no Toshi no Kure So no San); 156. "Year's End Through the Mirror (Part 4)" (鏡の中の年の暮れ 其の四, Kagami no Naka no Toshi no Kure So no Shi); 157. "Year's End Through the Mirror (Part 5)" (鏡の中の年の暮れ 其の五, Kagami no Naka no Toshi no Kure So no Go); 158. "Year's End Through the Mirror (Part 6)" (鏡の中の年の暮れ 其の六, Kagami no Naka no Toshi no Kure So no Roku)
19	March 17, 2025	978-4-06-538712-2	December 2, 2025 (digital)	979-8-89-478803-6
159. "Year's End Through the Mirror (Part 7)" (鏡の中の年の暮れ 其の七, Kagami no Naka no Toshi no Kure So no Shichi); 160. "Year's End Through the Mirror (Part 8)" (鏡の中の年の暮れ 其の八, Kagami no Naka no Toshi no Kure So no Hachi); 161. "Year's End Through the Mirror (Part 9)" (鏡の中の年の暮れ 其の九, Kagami no Naka no Toshi no Kure So no Kyū); 162. "Year's End Through the Mirror (Part 10)" (鏡の中の年の暮れ 其の十, Kagami no Naka no Toshi no Kure So no Jū); 163. "Year's End Through the Mirror (Part 11)" (鏡の中の年の暮れ 其の十一, Kagami no Naka no Toshi no Kure So no Jūichi); 164. "Year's End Through the Mirror (Part 12)" (鏡の中の年の暮れ 其の十二, Kagami no Naka no Toshi no Kure So no Jūni); 165. "Year's End Through the Mirror (Part 13)" (鏡の中の年の暮れ 其の十三, Kagami no Naka no Toshi no Kure So no Jūsan); 166. "Year's End Through the Mirror (Part 14)" (鏡の中の年の暮れ 其の十四, Kagami no Naka no Toshi no Kure So no Jūshi); 167. "Year's End Through the Mirror (Part 15)" (鏡の中の年の暮れ 其の十五, Kagami no Naka no Toshi no Kure So no Jūgo)
20	June 17, 2025	978-4-06-539765-7	March 3, 2026 (digital)	979-8-89-830029-6
168. "Year's End Through the Mirror (Part 16)" (鏡の中の年の暮れ 其の十六, Kagami no Naka no Toshi no Kure So no Jūroku); 169. "Year's End Through the Mirror (Part 17)" (鏡の中の年の暮れ 其の十七, Kagami no Naka no Toshi no Kure So no Jūshichi); 170. "Year's End Through the Mirror (Part 18)" (鏡の中の年の暮れ 其の十八, Kagami no Naka no Toshi no Kure So no Jūhachi); 171. "A New Romantic Comedy Play" (甘ったるい新喜劇, Amattarui Shinkigeki); 172. "Ways to Make Me Happy" (君が私を幸せにする方法について, Kimi ga Watashi o Shiawase ni Suru Hōhō ni Tsuite); 173. "Lilies Floating on the Pond" (浅池に睡蓮, Asaike no Suiren); 174. "How to Hate" (嫌いになるためには, Kirai ni Naru Tame ni wa); 175. "The Pup at My Side" (隣の子犬, Tonari no Koinu); 176. "Tying the Skies Together – Beginning" (空の結び方 序, Sora no Musubi-kata Jo)
21	August 12, 2025	978-4-06-540369-3	May 5, 2026 (digital)	979-8-89-830100-2
177. "Tying the Skies Together – Realization" (空の結び方 気, Sora no Musubi-kata Kizuki); 178. "Tying the Skies Together – Stars" (空の結び方 星, Sora no Musubi-kata Hoshiboshi); 179. "Tying the Skies Together – Twilight" (空の結び方 昏, Sora no Musubi-kata Tasogare); 180. "Tying the Skies Together – Daybreak" (空の結び方 暁, Sora no Musubi-kata Akatsuki); 181. "Tying the Skies Together – Deliberation" (空の結び方 慮, Sora no Musubi-kata Omonbakaru); 182. "Tying the Skies Together – Investigation" (空の結び方 探, Sora no Musubi-kata Saguru); 183. "Tying the Skies Together – Origin" (空の結び方 始, Sora no Musubi-kata Hajimari); 184. "Tying the Skies Together – Happiness" (空の結び方 幸, Sora no Musubi-kata Shiawase); 185. "Tying the Skies Together – Answer" (空の結び方 答, Sora no Musubi-kata Kotaeru)
22	October 17, 2025	978-4-06-541113-1; 978-4-06-541111-7 (SE)	August 4, 2026 (digital)	979-8-89-830204-7
186. "Tying the Skies Together – Assent" (空の結び方 応, Sora no Musubi-kata Kotaeru); 187. "Tying the Skies Together – Cord" (空の結び方 緒, Sora no Musubi-kata Ribon); 188. "Tying the Skies Together – Night" (空の結び方 夜, Sora no Musubi-kata Yoru); 189. "Tying the Skies Together – Collection" (空の結び方 重, Sora no Musubi-kata Kasanaru); 190. "Tying the Skies Together – Morning" (空の結び方 朝, Sora no Musubi-kata Asa); 191. "Tying the Skies Together – Princess" (空の結び方 姫, Sora no Musubi-kata Hime); 192. "Tying the Skies Together – Evening" (空の結び方 夕, Sora no Musubi-kata Yūbe); 193. "Tying the Skies Together – Stitch" (空の結び方 奈, Sora no Musubi-kata Karanashi); 194. "A Miraculous Ending" (奇跡の終, Kiseki no Hate)

=== Anime ===
An anime television series adaptation was announced during a livestream that celebrated the manga's second anniversary and Naito's birthday on April 21, 2023. It is produced by Drive and directed by Yujiro Abe, with Hiroshi Watanabe serving as assistant director, Yasuko Aoki writing the scripts, Haruko Iizuka designing the characters, and Ryo Kawasaki and Tomoyuki Kono composing the music. The series aired from October 2, 2024, to March 26, 2025, on TV Tokyo and its affiliates. (Note: TV Tokyo lists the series premiere on October 1, 2024, at 24:00, which is effectively October 2 at midnight JST.) For the first cour, the opening theme song is "Yawaku Koishite ~Zutto Bokura de Iraremasu yō ni~" (やわく恋して ～ずっと僕らでいられますように～), performed by Momoiro Clover Z, while the ending theme song is "Kimi ni Koi wo Musunde" (君に恋を結んで; lit. To Tie You With Love), performed by Sumire Uesaka, Kaede Hondo and Shion Wakayama as the three Amagami sisters. For the second cour, the opening theme song is "Pray Pray Pray", performed by Uesaka, Hondo and Wakayama as the three Amagami sisters, while the ending theme song is "Kami-sama no Iu Tōri!" (神様の言うとーり！; lit. As the Gods Say), performed by ≠Me. Crunchyroll streams the series. Plus Media Networks Asia licensed the series in Southeast Asia and broadcasts it on Aniplus Asia.

==== Episodes ====
No.	Title	Directed by (Note: Production staff information is taken from the ending credits of each episode.)	Storyboarded by	Original release date
1	"The Miracle Begins"; Transliteration: "Kiseki no Hajimari" (Japanese: 奇跡のはじまり)	Ori Yasukawa	Yujiro Abe	October 2, 2024
17 year old orphan Uryu dreams of becoming a doctor and absolutely does not believe in God, so he is exasperated to be moving into Amagami Shrine with the elderly priest Chidori. However he finds only three girls, Chidori's granddaughters and Shrine Maidens; 20 year old Yae (whom secretly has unrequited feelings for him) and 14 year old Asahi welcome him while 17 year old Yuna declares Uryu a blasphemous pervert. Her opinion of him worsens when he manages to end up in lewd situations with all three of them. Yuna is devastated when a bird steals the hair tie she inherited from her deceased mother. She and Uryu argue again when she decides to pray for luck instead of just looking for it. He later disappears, worrying Yae that he left, until they find a photograph showing he used to believe in God until his mother died. Uryu is shown searching bird nests, though in the end he does say a prayer for luck. Seeing him, Yuna decides to give him a chance. On their way back they witness a meteor shower known locally as the Magical Star Shower that answers prayers. To Uryu's disbelief the hair tie blows down from a nest and lands on Yuna's head. Chidori finally returns to the shrine and immediately requests that Uryu marry one of his granddaughters, much to his shock as he heavily detests the idea of having a significant other.
2	"String Cranes at Midday"; Transliteration: "Hakuchū to Tsuru" (Japanese: 白昼と鶴)	Chika Manganji	Hiroshi Watanabe	October 9, 2024
Chidori explains that Uryu will one day take over as priest, and when Uryu protests that he does not want to marry any of them, he bribes him with easier entry into Kyoto University. Uryu of course plans to break his promise as soon as he gets into Kyoto, but in the meantime the sisters plan to make him miserable so he leaves. First they make him responsible for cooking, laundry and cleaning Yae's messy bedroom. When he does all this perfectly they consider letting him stay, but Uryu announces he is leaving since so many chores will get in the way of studying. Yuna soon feels guilty so they follow Uryu all the way to the foster home where he was raised by Dr. Mahiru alongside his childhood friend Shirahi and other children whose parents are too ill to look after them. Seeing Uryu interact with the children gives the girls an insight into his past and desire to become a doctor. At Mahiru's persuasion Uryu agrees to return to the shrine while the girls agree to do some chores themselves. They are so bad at chores Uryu is doomed to do it all himself anyway. Chidori is glad to see Uryu taking over as man of the house and decides it is time for each granddaughter to have an arranged marriage meeting with Uryu.
3	"A Tryst with the Gods"; Transliteration: "Kami-sama to no Ōse" (Japanese: 神様との逢瀬)	Masahiro Watanabe	Hiroshi Watanabe	October 16, 2024
Uryu meets with Asahi first only to be forced on a 5-hour jog and then find her missing running shoes. Searching the storeroom Asahi teases Uryu with what might happen were they to become trapped, just as the door slams closed. Uryu realises Asahi suffers from claustrophobia, so he lets her cling to him while he breaks a window. She apologises but becomes flustered when he calls her cute. Next he meets Yuna who abruptly demands he make her pregnant. Yae and Asahi explain Yuna sees it as her duty to marry Uryu so her sisters do not have to. Uryu moves their meeting to a cat café to cheer her up and she eventually agrees to relax so her sisters do not worry about her. Yae goes missing before their meeting but Uryu finds her at the Inari Shrine where she claims her reasons are secret. As an apology she buys him a good luck charm then teases him by asking which sister he prefers. Shocked, Uryu refuses to reciprocate her feelings and starts to back away, but falls down the shrine stairs and experiences a vision of himself as a doctor marrying all three sisters, leaving him shaken and in denial. He suddenly awakens in his room and suspects he dreamed everything, until he finds the broken charm Yae bought him on his desk.
4	"The Amagami Shrine Festival ~Connections~"; Transliteration: "Amagami-jinja Rei-taisai ~Tsunagari~" (Japanese: 甘神神社例大祭 ～繋(つながり)～)	Yuki Watanabe	Yuki Watanabe	October 23, 2024
Yae is unaware of Uryu falling down stairs. Miemon, head of Kitashirakawa clan that owns the shrine, decides to sell it as worshipper attendance has fallen since the death of the girl's mother, whom he insults. Uryu challenges Miemon; if they attract 5000 visitors during the festival, he will keep supporting them. Miemon agrees, but warns if they do not get 5000 then he will also sell their house. Uryu decides to advertise on social media. Asahi attempts to advertise using the girls beauty, causing an argument with Yuna. Eventually they reconcile, and a picture Uryu takes of the girls smiling goes viral. Hoping to lure people with merchandise Uryu asks Yae to design a limited edition charm, but Yae fails to find inspiration and procrastinates all the way to the deadline. Yae eventually produces a design of cherry blossoms and the shrine's Koi Carp, though Uryu still scolds her for procrastinating, which flusters her. Uryu begs shop owners to set up stalls at the shrine to attract more visitors; otherwise it will be closed forever. The owners agree as they all have fond memories of the shrine but had no idea it was in so much trouble. The girls realise without Uryu helping them connect with the community none of this would have been possible.
5	"The Amagami Shrine Festival ~Blossoming~"; Transliteration: "Amagami-jinja Rei-taisai ~Saku~" (Japanese: 甘神神社例大祭 ～咲～)	Masahiro Watanabe	Tetsuto Saitō	October 30, 2024
On the day of the festival almost no one visits and Asahi discovers someone made a fake social media account for the shrine and announced the festival was cancelled. Uryu realises Miemon is sabotaging them. With only 7 hours left Uryu makes a radical proposal that surprisingly meets with Chidori's approval. Uryu rushes to hand out fliers and is surprised to receive help from Mahiru, Shirahi and the children. Meanwhile, the sisters ride through town with the shrine on a parade float, attracting huge numbers of visitors. A sudden rain storm stops people from coming. The sisters pray for success while Uryu realises the storm has covered the shrine's koi pond in beautiful cherry blossom petals. Soon even more visitors arrive to watch the sisters dancing on the island at the pond's centre. With only 5 minutes remaining they have only attracted 4999 visitors, until Miemon admits they won, since they forgot he has been at the shrine all day, making him the 5000th visitor. As such, he agrees the shrine can stay open. As he leaves Miemon remains hopeful that one day he can manipulate their gratitude towards him for his own purposes. Yae is so happy she impulsively kisses Uryu on the cheek, shocking her sisters and leaving Uryu stunned and dumbfounded.
6	"From Dawn till Dusk"; Transliteration: "Asa kara Yoru ni Kake te" (Japanese: 朝から夜にかけて)	Naoki Hishikawa	Hiroshi Watanabe	November 6, 2024
Asahi decides to find out if Yae really likes him but despite investigating Yae continues to insist her feelings are secret. Asahi becomes annoyed that Uryu treats her like a child, so she bites his ear before running away. The kiss plus the bite leaves Uryu baffled, and he reminds himself to never fall for any of the girls. Yuno and Yae start acting secretive, and Uryu discovers they are making gifts for Asahi's birthday; a good luck charm and a stuffed animal. While they are competing over whose is better, both gifts are ruined. The next morning the girls discover Uryu stayed up all night repairing the gifts. Uryu has an erotic dream of Yuna. Yuna lectures Yae and Asahi for getting too close to Uryu. They in turn scold her for acting coldly towards him. Mahiru scolds Uryu for assuming the sisters are helpless and advises him to treat them like equals, to which he relectunatly agrees. Uryu is baffled when Yuna suddenly starts trying to show him appreciation and attempts to reject her on the spot, only to realise her rubbing his shoulders is identical to the erotic dream he had. He suspects he actually dreamed the future, which is confirmed when Yuna almost accidentally kisses him, which thanks to his dream he is quickly able to prevent. It is made clear to Yuna that Uryu does not reciprocate her feelings in any way, which leaves her disappointed. However she privately decides that she must do more to expel impurities and attempt to move on from her hopeless crush.
7	"Dream and Moon and Dream ~New Moon~"; Transliteration: "Yume to Tsuki to Yume ~Sakugetsu~" (Japanese: 夢と月と夢 ～朔(さくげつ)～)	Yoshihisa Matsumoto & Hidehiko Kadota	Yoshihisa Matsumoto	November 13, 2024
Uryu has a dream of another shrine. Next morning Yuna announces they must visit Tsukigami Shrine to ask Shrine Maiden Yomiko advice. Determined to avoid the future, Uryu refuses to go, but Chidori tricks him into going anyway. Tsukigami is famous for the Moonlit Rainbow, which causes dreams to come true. Yomiko believes they are unsuited to continue running their shrine. Instead she asks them to consider whether they wish to run the shrine or follow their other dreams. She also warns Uryu if the girls wish to run the shrine, it will be up to him to make it possible by marrying one of them. Uryu decides he cannot marry as he is determined to become a doctor. Yae runs away so Asahi chases after her. Yuna becomes catatonic so Uryu is forced to look after her, even though it follows his dream. Yuna admits she runs the shrine from obligation, dismissing everything else as unimportant. Uryu catches Yomiko spying and becomes suspicious. Soon after, Uryu catches a still dazed Yuna trying to begin waterfall meditation and accidentally gropes her whilst pulling her out, snapping her back to her normal angry self. She yells at him that if he really wanted to be a doctor he would study instead of helping them all the time. He shouts back that he does that because he wants to, making her laugh and feel better.
8	"Dream and Moon and Dream ~Half Moon~"; Transliteration: "Yume to Tsuki to Yume ~Gengetsu~" (Japanese: 夢と月と夢 ～弦(げんげつ)～)	Maki Kamiya	Hidetoshi Yoshida	November 20, 2024
Asahi returns without Yae. Uryu follows his dream prediction and finds Yae by the river. She hints she would be willing to give up her future career to marry him. As predicted, Uryu falls into the river and wakes up in the bath at Tsukigami. It is revealed Yae struggles to make decisions because her mother used to always choose for her, so she tends to run away at stressful moments. She is touched when Uryu claims he will always help when she struggles, but warns him not to go making assumptions about the future. The next morning Asahi reveals to Uryu she has accepted an offer to attend a famous sports college and will be moving to Tokyo, though she is struggling to tell her sisters. Uryu insists she has to tell them but she runs away, so Uryu tells them instead. They reveal they knew Asahi was planning on leaving but chose to let her make the decision by herself. Uryu wonders if it is truly what Asahi wants so they chase after her. After hearing their support for her Asahi decides she wants to stay at the shrine with her sisters. She thanks Uryu for interfering as it helped her realise what she really wanted.
9	"Dream and Moon and Dream ~Full Moon~"; Transliteration: "Yume to Tsuki to Yume ~Mochizuki~" (Japanese: 夢と月と夢 ～望(もちづき)～)	Chika Manganji	Tetsuhito Satō	November 27, 2024
Uryu has a dream of a future where he is a doctor, head priest and married to all three sisters. Mahiru visits Yomiko, who reminisces about first meeting the sisters 6 years ago. Meanwhile, the girls admit to Uryu they wish they could spend more time with Yomiko. Mahiru realises Yomiko misses the girls too and tells her to stop making excuses and visit more often. Before the girls can return home Yomiko asks for their answers on what their dreams are. Surprisingly, all three dream of running the shrine. At first Yomiko is satisfied, until Uryu points out the girls are still immature and will require a lot more training to run the shrine by themselves. Amused, Yomiko agrees she will need to visit the girls regularly. Yomiko also reminds them someone still needs to marry Uryu. Uryu insists he will still become a doctor and offers to let the girls marry some of his foster brothers instead. All three sisters decide they would rather marry Uryu, with Asahi even wishing all three of them marry him. At that moment the multi-coloured street lights over the bridge come on and Uryu and the girls realise they are standing inside Tsukigami's famous Moonlit Rainbow, leading them to wonder if Asahi's wish might actually come true.
10	"Changing Clothes, Changing Hearts"; Transliteration: "Koromo-gae/Kokoro-gae" (Japanese: 衣替え・心替え)	Ori Yasukawa	Bob Shirahata	December 4, 2024
With break over, the girls return to school. Yuna is horrified her all-girls school has started accepting male students, including Uryu who transfers into her class as the only boy among 30 girls. Uryu is immediately popular, making Yuna jealous, but she stubbornly insists he not talk to her in public. This is made difficult when her friend Mitsuko notices something about them and starts trying to push them together. As the girls are unused to having boys around Uryu accidentally sees the whole class undressing for gym, though only Yuna realises. Uryu starts preparing box lunches for the girls but at school Mitsuko notices Yuna's lunch has similar ingredients to Uryu's, though he is able to eat his quickly before she can see they are actually identical. Regardless, she becomes more suspicious. Rather than being angry Yuna thanks him for the lunches but asks that he make sure they are not identical in the future. On his way home Uryu encounters Shirahi who tries to invite him to study together but Uryu suddenly spots the girls surrounded by obnoxious fans who recognised them as shrine maidens. Despite promising Yuna he would not talk to her in public he barges through the crowd to rescue them. Despite the situation all three girls tease Uryu for using their first names.
11	"The Real Reason For Staying Up Late ~Beginning~"; Transliteration: "Yofukashi no Shōtai ~Hajimari~" (Japanese: 夜ふかしの正体 ～序(はじまり)～)	Hidehiko Kadota & Yoshihisa Matsumoto	Yoshihisa Matsumoto	December 11, 2024
Uryu dreams of a lost girl he met as a young child. Yae goes drinking with classmates. Fearing for her chastity Yuna and Asahi send Uryu as her bodyguard. When Yae does indeed draw a lot of male attention Uryu is forced to claim to be her boyfriend. Her childhood friend Makoto, an actual student at Tokyo Medical University, knows they are lying and takes an immediate dislike to Uryu whom she views as a freeloader living in Yae's house. Returning her home Uryu finds Yae's wallet and is surprised to learn from her driving licence her legal name is Reiko Ichijoji, not Yae Amagami. Despite the late hour Yae is able to convince everyone to visit the city with Makoto to see all her favourite night time spots. Watching fireflies at the river Uryu tries to ask Yae about her real name but Makoto keeps interfering. Asahi tries to ask Uryu if he prefers Yae to her but cannot do it as she fears what his answer will be. At a convenience store Makoto continues interfering between Uryu and Yae so he ends up sharing ice creams with Yuna instead. Seeing this, Makoto starts relaxing around him, until he suddenly asks her if she knows Reiko Ichijoji. This makes her angry again and she warns him that as far as Yae is concerned Reiko Ichijoji no longer exists.
12	"The Real Reason For Staying Up Late ~Connections~"; Transliteration: "Yofukashi no Shōtai ~En~" (Japanese: 夜ふかしの正体 ～縁～)	Miyuki Iwata	Hiroshi Matsuzono	December 18, 2024
Makoto warns Uryu if he insists on knowing Reiko Ichijoji his dream will be over. They next visit Inari Shrine. Yae suggests splitting up so Uryu insists he and Yae will go together. Yuna and Asahi insist on Rock, Paper, Scissors with Yuna ending up with Uryu instead. Yae asks Asahi if she loves Uryu, shocking Asahi who falls over the fence. Yuna admits she hopes to see her mother's spirit at the shrine. Uryu admits he sometimes wonders if the gods are watching him. Asahi calls them, explaining Yae saved her but fell down the hill. Uryu climbs down after her but encounters a mystical floating mask and is inexplicably transported into the past. Confused and believing he is a child again he encounters a lost girl; Reiko Ichijoji. Uryu briefly realises she is just like Yae and then gets confused as he has no idea who Yae is. Uryu spends the whole day with her but several men appear to fetch her, revealing she is the daughter of an important woman. Reiko does not want to go as her mother controls her whole life and never lets her do anything. Uryu suddenly remembers everything about Yae and grabs Reiko's hand to help her escape. As they run Uryu realises Yae is Reiko and he was the one many years ago who changed her life forever.
13	"The Real Reason For Staying Up Late ~Love~"; Transliteration: "Yofukashi no Shōtai ~Koi~" (Japanese: 夜ふかしの正体 ～恋～)	Masahiko Watanabe	Bob Shirahata	December 25, 2024
Uryu makes Yae laugh but she quickly stops, revealing her mother punishes her for laughing. Uryu takes her to a secret spot where she can shout and it will stay secret. Yae shouts about hating her mother and wanting to be free. Uryu realises this explains adult Yae's personality; once she attained freedom she did not know what to do with it, so she feels lost. Uryu promises when she is lost he will always find her. Uryu abruptly returns to the present and finds Yae. Yae reveals it was meeting Uryu that helped her escape her mother and find Amagami Shrine. The others find them and Makoto is glad Uryu changed Yae's fate. Returning home Yae hides in her room, having realised she is in love with Uryu. Over the next few days Uryu notices Yae always wanting to be near him and even teasing him suggestively, though Uryu always shuts her down out of annoyance and embarrassment. Asahi and Yuna notice this and demand to know if they are dating. Yae admits she plans to ask Uryu out officially once he is less busy with studying, but in the meantime she intends to try to seduce him as often as possible. She is also determined that no matter what, she will be the one to marry him.
14	"The Scales That Hold Wishes ~Loop~"; Transliteration: "Negai o Nose ta Tenbin ~Mawaru~" (Japanese: 願いをのせた天秤 ～廻(まわる)～)	Ken Sanuma	Ken Sanuma	January 15, 2025
For the Tanabata festival Asahi distributes wish charms to her classmates. Karen Matsugazaki, Asahi's athletic rival, wishes for victory at the next marathon so Asahi also wishes for victory. Yuna, Yae and Uryu promise to watch the race. A large storm is forecast so the marathon is delayed to July 7th, the same day as Tanabata when Yuna and Yae are busy. During the race Asahi is distracted and falls behind Karen. Uryu turns up with Yomiko and with Yuna and Yae on a video call. With everyone cheering her on Asahi wins first place. The very next day Uryu awakens expecting it to be July 8th, yet somehow it is June 28th, 10 days in the past. Asahi is also aware of time reversing as she remembers winning the marathon on July 7th. Unsure what to do they live the week exactly as they did before and Asahi wins the race a second time, but on the morning of July 8th time reverses to June 28th again. Since Asahi is aware of time reversing Uryu reasons the loop was created by either the marathon or Tanabata, both important events to Asahi. Since she has won the race twice Uyru suggests next time she attend Tanabata with her sisters.
15	"The Scales That Hold Wishes ~Going Back~"; Transliteration: "Negai o Nose ta Tenbin ~Modoru~" (Japanese: 願いをのせた天秤 ～戻(もどる)～)	None (Note: The episode listed no episode director)	Tetsuhito Saito	January 22, 2025
Asahi recalls winning the marathon against Karen in elementary school without having to try very hard. For Tanabata Asahi suggests a beauty contest. Shirahi visits to make her wish to be accepted to Kyoto University. Uryu refuses to make a wish, preferring to rely on his own effort. Somehow, all three sisters receive the same number of votes. Realising Uryu has not voted Asahi steals it from his pocket and finds he voted for her, making her the victor. Yuna and Yae become jealous and punish him. Karen visits but refuses to make a wish since her wish is impossible. Asahi retrieves her ruined wish from the ground and finds all Karen wished for was a race against Asahi where they both try their hardest. Despite the festival's success Uryu and Asahi once again awaken on June 28th. Uryu suggests finding a way to both win the marathon and make Tanabata a success. This time when he calls Yomiko she is curious why he thinks Asahi only cares about the marathon or the festival. Uryu realises she is right; the whole time he was pushing his own ideas onto Asahi but never asked her opinion. Asahi starts to realise she has not been happy for a long time. Karen suddenly visits.
16	"The Scales That Hold Wishes ~Going Forward~"; Transliteration: "Negai o Nose ta Tenbin ~Susumu~" (Japanese: 願いをのせた天秤 ～進(すすむ)～)	Ōri Yasukawa	Hiroshi Matsuzono	January 29, 2025
Karen insists they race and if Asahi loses she must quit racing. Karen reveals her disappointment Asahi has been neglecting training while she has improved. Karen wins the race and is elated she can forget their rivalry. Asahi admits she never knew what was more important, running or the shrine, but now realises their rivalry was what kept her going. They decide their rivalry will be concluded running the marathon. Asahi wins the marathon on the 7th and the next day she and Uryu awaken on the 8th, having escaped the time loop when Asahi realised what she really wanted for herself. Chidori announces a change to the calendar means they will be holding a second Tanabata festival on August 7th. Yomiko accidentally reveals the second festival was secretly Uryu's idea so Asahi could enjoy it with her sisters. Uryu suspects Yomiko was in the time loop with them, helping him. Yomiko prays to a masked God with thanks for their help. At the fireworks later Asahi loses Yuna and Yae so Uryu escorts her, holding her hand. Asahi thanks him since without him she fears she would still be stuck in the loop. She also knows Uryu only sees her as a sister, and will likely marry either Yuna or Yae, but she refuses to give up and shocks him by kissing him and confessing her love.
17	"The Send-Off Fires and the Vow with the Gods"; Transliteration: "Okuri-bi to Kami-sama to no Chigiri" (Japanese: 送り火と神様との契り)	Masahiko Watanabe	Hiroshi Watanabe & Bob Shirahata	February 5, 2025
Uryu cannot focus and receives a B on an exam. Mahiru advises him to have a serious talk about marriage. Uryu considers becoming a doctor too important to risk inheriting the shrine. Mahiru gives her opinion that he would be an excellent priest. At the shrine he finds the girls praying for souls to return to heaven after the festival, including their mother and his mother. Chidori decides to tell Uryu the secret. Chihiru adopted all three sisters separately, so none of the sisters are related by blood nor are they related to Chihiru. Uryu is unsurprised and realises he and the girls have something in common; orphans raised by someone special. The girls start doing chores, confusing Uryu. They admit to eavesdropping on his conversation with Mahiru, so they showed him they can do chores on their own in preparation for evicting him from the shrine to live his own life. They also intend to find another heir. Uryu leaves then turns round and comes right back to the shrine, declaring that he has grown up since meeting them and has a new dream of becoming a doctor and heir to Amagami Shrine. Relieved that he came back the girls tackle him, demanding to know which of them he will be marrying, making him feel pressured and embarrassed.
18	"Nadeshiko Hide-and-Seek ~Switch~"; Transliteration: "Nadeshiko no Kakurenbo ~Kawaru~" (Japanese: 撫子のかくれんぼ ～換(かわる)～)	Shunji Yoshida	Tomomi Mochizuki	February 12, 2025
Uryu catches a cold and while caring for him Yuna almost kisses him. With only vague memory of this Uryu eventually recovers but Yuna ends up catching a cold as well. Yuna insists she needs to work harder to support Uryu, but he insists she relax. Yuna prays for continued good health, only for the shrines masked God to visit her. Everyone returns to school and begin planning for the Nadeshiko Festival. Yuna and Uryu's class plan to perform The Changeling, a story of two siblings, a feminine prince and a masculine princess, both of whom live as the opposite gender. As the only boy Uryu is chosen to play the feminine prince, so Yuna volunteers as the masculine princess. Mitsuko is pleased as she is still convinced they are secretly dating. However, later that night it is revealed the God caused Uryu and Yuna to switch bodies several days ago, and have been trying to act normally so no one else realises. This includes getting used to their new bodies and performing each others chores and shrine duties. They are both terrified when Asahi asks Uryu to be her lover, and Yae tells Yuna she is in love with Uryu, unaware who they are really speaking to. Realising just waiting around will not fix things they decide they need to find a cure themselves.
19	"Nadeshiko Hide-and-Seek ~Worry~"; Transliteration: "Nadeshiko no Kakurenbo ~Nayamu~" (Japanese: 撫子のかくれんぼ ～懊(なやむ)～)	Chika Manganji	Shin'ya Kawabe	February 19, 2025
Yuna worries they have an English test approaching, and if she does badly she will ruin Uryu's grades. Uryu worries there is a ceremony for which he will have to dance. Uryu accidentally reveals to Mitsuko he is heir to the shrine. Mitsuko realises something is wrong since Yuna would never be happy about that. This confuses Uryu. The Masked God suddenly switches Uryu and Yuna back to their own bodies. Yuna awakens to an angry Mitsuko while Uryu awakens where Yuna had just been, in an unfamiliar part of town with a key. Returning the key to Yuna he demands to know how she really feels about him being the heir. She assures him she is fine with it but Uryu is not convinced. Overnight, the Masked God switches them again but then starts switching them at random, inconvenient moments. As Yuna, Uryu finds books showing Yuna has been considering careers other than shrine maiden. Mitsuko realises he is Uryu in Yuna's body and takes him to the unfamiliar part of town, where the key turns out to be to Mitsuko's parent's café where Yuna had hidden a secret list of everything she wanted to do in the future. Eavesdropping, Yuna cannot believe Uryu found her list, but Uryu refuses to invade Yuna's privacy by reading it. Instead he thanks the God for helping him meet the real Yuna. Her job done, the God switches them back.
20	"Nadeshiko Hide-and-Seek ~Attraction~"; Transliteration: "Nadeshiko no Kakurenbo ~Hikareru~" (Japanese: 撫子のかくれんぼ ～惹(ひかれる)～)	Michita Shiraishi	Tetsuhito Saitō	February 26, 2025
Yuna reveals her diary only contains ideas on improving the shrine. She also reveals Shinto religions are very patriarchal so many prefer to adopt men like Uryu rather than allow women to inherit. Realising she is hiding her feelings again Uryu tells her if she wants to be Head Priestess then fight for it. Reacting to his picking a fight Yuna insists she will take over the shrine instead of him. During Nadeshiko Festival Mitsuko warns Uryu boys visit from other schools to flirt with the girls, so he ends up escorting Yae to keep her safe. Yuna notices them holding hands. Asahi is disappointed she did not get to spend time with Uryu, so she visits a "Shout Your Feelings" stall and yells loudly enough for him to find her. Yuna feels even worse seeing them together. While preparing for The Changeling Uryu and Yuna learn the original ending saw the prince and princess return to their original genders to pursue their dreams, mirroring their own gender-swapping experience. Yuna asks Uryu what he thinks of Yae and Asahi but is disappointed with his response he is too young for marriage. The play is a huge success, though it causes Shirahi to leave upset. Yuna becomes embarrassed around Uryu and believes she is possessed by an evil spirit, but Mitsuko explains she is actually in love with Uryu.
21	"Shirahi's Mirage ~Divergence~"; Transliteration: "Hakujitsu no Nige-mizu ~Kotonaru~" (Japanese: 白日の逃げ水 ～異(ことなる)～)	Masahiko Watanabe	Hiroshi Matsuzono	March 5, 2025
Shirahi visits Uryu at the shrine and is upset all three sisters are clearly in love with him, so she impulsively asks him to visit her house for dinner. Uryu almost agrees, but the sisters cause an accident trying to cook their own dinner so Uryu is forced to postpone. Realising she barely recognises the man he has become a broken-hearted Shirahi wishes desperately for the old Uryu to return, so he can be hers. The girls decide to visit Kuragami Shrine which is rumoured to have started granting wishes. The girls consider what wishes they might make, which all end up being marrying Uryu. In the mountains they find Kuragami abandoned. Uryu prefers not to make a wish as he still wants to succeed on his own. The girls agree and as they leave all four of them share a very brief vision of the future where they run Amagami together. Nearby, a jealous Shirahi desperately asks Kuragami to grant her wish. Uryu suddenly awakens at his old foster home where Shirahi tries to seduce him like it is normal. Panicking, he runs all the way to Amagami Shrine but the girls do not know him and threaten to call the police. Devastated he returns to the foster home where Shirahi tries to cheer him up, revealing she is his girlfriend.
22	"Shirahi's Mirage ~Feelings~"; Transliteration: "Hakujitsu no Nige-mizu ~Omoi~" (Japanese: 白日の逃げ水 ～想(おもい)～)	Shunji Yoshida	Bob Shirahata	March 12, 2025 (Note: This episode aired at 12:10 a.m. JST, 10 minutes after the original air time on TV Tokyo.)
Uryu suspects the past was changed so he was never sent to Amagami. In this reality he attends a different high school and already has a recommendation for Kyoto University. Despite this he is determined to return to his real life, but when he asks Shirahi for help and describes his old life where they were not dating, she assumes he wants to break up. Mahiru scolds him, reminding him he was Shirahi's first friend after losing her parents. Uryu apologises to Shirahi but still worries about the girls. By chance he encounters Asahi who runs away from him. He follows her to Amagami where Yae beats him up, only to realise he was trying to return the hair tie Asahi dropped. Apologising for scaring them he is able to tell them about his real life living with them. All three sisters find something familiar about him, but eventually send him away. Yae suddenly stops him, having remembered meeting him as children. Mahiru worries Uryu has been gone a long time, but Shirahi already knows where he is. Yuna and Asahi remain sceptical but slowly realise he knows more about them than even a stalker could know. They still refuse to let him live with them, but as shrine maidens they offer to help him return to his own world and the other versions of themselves waiting for him. Happy to have their help Uryu leaves for the night but finds an upset Shirahi outside the door, who furiously introduces herself as his girlfriend, much to his shock.
23	"Shirahi's Mirage ~Ties~"; Transliteration: "Hakujitsu no Nige-mizu ~Musubu~" (Japanese: 白日の逃げ水 ～結(むすぶ)～)	Masahiko Watanabe	Hiroshi Matsuzono	March 19, 2025
Yuna decides to let them both stay the night and figure everything out in the morning, though Shirahi remains resentful and hostile towards them, desperately wanting Uryu as her boyfriend, which only disturbs him even further. Shirahi sneaks into his room so they can study together, still intending to realise their dream of opening a hospital and expanding the foster home. Shirahi becomes tired and apologises to Uryu in her sleep. The next morning Uryu demands to know if she is the one who changed the past. Shirahi admits she made a wish at Kuragami and blames herself for not confessing her feelings earlier. Uryu thanks her for her honesty, but tells her he does not feel the same way. Shirahi is surprised when Uryu asks to pray at the shrine before they leave. Uryu explains that while he struggles with his faith he has seen the benefits it brings to others, which is why his dream now includes being a doctor and a priest. Seeing the girls are short-staffed Shirahi volunteers as a temporary shrine maiden and starts to understand how Uryu felt working with them. Shirahi apologises for changing the past and decides to help change it back, hoping visiting Kuragami again will fix everything. The girls volunteer to help them after the Fall festival is over. Shirahi asks Uryu how he honestly feels about the girls, but he cannot find the words and is unsure if he actually reciprocates their feelings. The girls begin their festival dance and as Shirahi watches Uryu she is convinced she knows what his feelings really are. As Uryu and Shirahi are about to leave Yomiko suddenly arrives.
24	"Tying the Knot with an Amagami Sister"; Transliteration: "Amagami-san Chi no Enmusubi" (Japanese: 甘神さんちの縁結び)	Unknown	TBA	March 26, 2025
Yomiko explains Gods create connections and in this instance the connection is between two worlds, one where they are dating and one where they are not. Uryu is confused why the Gods would let him keep his memories of the world where they were not dating. Yomiko is impressed by his question but claims he is not ready for the answer. Uryu realises Yomiko's knowledge of every supernatural thing that has happened to him should not be possible. Yomiko merely claims she serves the Gods. Uryu decides to make a second wish to Kuragami. The masked God is amused and as Yomiko joins her it is revealed Yomiko has a mask of her own. Uryu and Shirahi are confronted by Kuragami who accepts Shirahi's wish to return home but reveals by bringing them to this world she forged a bond between them, but if they choose to return home the bond will be destroyed permanently. Shirahi confesses she loves him and asks to know what his feelings are. After a difficult start he admits he wants to make the sisters happy, and while he does have feelings for them he is not sure if it is romantic or paternal. Accepting this, Shirahi decides once their bond is severed she will just have to forge a new one. Kuragami returns them home. Uryu awakens in his room and looks for the sisters in a panic, accidentally walking in on them naked in the bathroom again. During a BBQ Miemon pays an unexpected visit to cause mischief but is forced to behave by Yomiko and Mahiru, who knew Miemon when they were younger. Chidori is glad to see everything so lively. The masked God watches them and is satisfied.
