= Kaede Sato =

Japanese footballer

Personal information
- Date of birth: 4 January 1992 (age 34)
- Place of birth: Oita Prefecture, Japan
- Height: 1.70 m (5 ft 7 in)
- Position: Defender

Team information
- Current team: MyNavi Sendai Ladies
- Number: 19

Senior career*
Years	Team	Apps	(Gls)
2011-2012	Fukuoka J. Anclas	24	(2)
2013-2016	Speranza Osaka-Takatsuki	76	(11)
2017	Iga FC Kunoichi Mie	18	(3)
2018-	MyNavi Sendai Ladies	52	(3)
- * Club domestic league appearances and goals

Kaede Sato (佐藤 楓, Satō Kaede; born 4 January 1992) is a Japanese professional footballer who plays as a defender for WE League club MyNavi Sendai Ladies.

== Club career ==
Sato made her WE League debut on 12 September 2021.
