= Reborn Superstar! =

2023 studio album by Hanabie

Studio album by Hanabie.
- Released: July 26, 2023
- Genre: Metalcore; electronicore
- Length: 29:15
- Language: Japanese
- Label: Epic Records Japan

Hanabie. chronology
Girl's Reform Manifest (2021)	Reborn Superstar! (2023)	Bucchigiri Tokyo (2024)

Reborn Superstar! (Japanese: 来世は偉人, Hepburn: Raise wa Ijin!) is the second studio album by Japanese metalcore band Hanabie, released on July 26, 2023 by Epic Records Japan, a subsidiary of Sony Music Japan. The album received international recognition for its unique take on metalcore, being covered in various media outlets across the US and Europe, exposure which resulted in various musical festival appearances by the band on their first EU and US tours. Commercially, it received moderate success, shipping 1,956 units within the first week of release and ranking 24th on Billboard Japan's weekly album charts. The cover art is by digital illustrator Ponko.

== Background ==
In July 2023, Hanabie performed at the Japanese music festival Satanic Carnival. During the performance the band announced that they had signed with Sony Music Japan followed by an announcement of a new album. The name of the album and the release date were revealed via a video skit uploaded on the band's official YouTube channel. Four of the ten songs in the album were released prior to the album as digital singles. "Neet Game" was released in August 2022, and "Pardon Me I Have to Go Now" was released in January 2023. These were followed by "Run Away" and "Be the Gal (Early Summer Version)" in June and July, respectively. All the songs were written before the departure of the band's former drummer Sae in April 2023.

== Writing and composition ==
Much of Reborn Superstar! was written by singer Yukina and guitarist/singer Matsuri, except "Blast Off," which was solely composed by Matsuri, and "Me, the Ultimate Invader of the Universe," which was written by Matsuri and bassist Hettsu. Several songs on the album feature lyrics about outer space. In an interview with Rolling Stone Japan the band admitted that they were aiming for a "sparkly" sound and used synths to this effect, this influencing the space-related lyrics. In another interview, Matsuri stated that the songs on their earlier albums were written when the band members were still in high school and consequently were rather hard-edged, and in Reborn Superstar! they were aiming for a different sound, instead of strictly adhering to the metalcore genre. According to Yukina, they wanted to make something which "even the people who do not like metal song would be interested in." While composing the songs Matsuri designed sections where the bass guitar could be highlighted because, according to her own admission, there were not enough opportunities for Hettsu to express herself in their previous album.

"Our first album Girls Reform Manifest was a compilation of my high school and college sophomore years, so I think I wrote those in a hard-edged way. This time, in terms of the concept of the songs, I felt it was okay to play around as much as I wanted, so I wrote some phrases in which the bass guitar stood out. Also, many of the songs are more like mixed-genre than strictly metalcore songs, so I put in a lot of groovy phrases in that sense as well."

— Matsuri, Rolling Stones Japan

The first track "Blast Off" is an overture with the theme of the band members departing on a spaceship. The synthesizer sounds create an outer space feel with the bass drop at the end reminiscent of the sound made by a moving spaceship. "Blast Off" was originally titled "Brain BGM". The song was added to the album after writing the second track "Hyperdimension Galaxy". That song was written with a conventional structure and pop style, out of awareness of recently signing with a major label and to convey moving into the unknown. Lyrically, the song is about delivering music from Japan to outer space, a metaphor for people overseas. Originally a love song inspired by the Netflix drama First Love, and was intended to feel like an anime song.

"Neet Game" has a loud and distorted sound akin to a video game soundtrack. The song has a traditional song structure and electronic sounds, and as one of the first songs written from the album it foreshadows many of the album's other songs. The lyrics are intended to encourage those who left the music scene during the COVID-19 pandemic. "Be the Gal (Early Summer Version)" is about the inability to become a gyaru, a fashion sub-culture the band members admired but were too young to adopt. Written with a summer theme to coincide with the band's major debut and to be popular at festivals and with clubgoers. It features an Arabian-style guitar solo by Matsuri.

The fifth track "Tale of Villain" is about Ursula from The Little Mermaid who extracts souls through singing, but also cares for her underlings. The "sa" sounds indicate a loss of voice. Ocean sounds were added by Yukina, according to whom the song's dark mood masks its playful lyrics. "Warning!!" is about Gen Z, referencing digital natives who don't have a driver's license, watch TV, or read newspapers, and who fall asleep looking at their smartphones. Musically, the song consists of multiple parts that transition abruptly like the fever dreams experienced as a child by Matsuri. Matsuri thought it would be interesting to have Hettsu appear unexpectedly and asked her to sing her last line like a gyaru, increasing the sense of chaos through the different singing styles. This song was the last song recorded and the most difficult for new drummer Chika, whose sheet music contained so many notes, it looked pitch black.

"I Am the Most Powerful Invader Girl" (titled "Me, the Ultimate Invader of the Universe" in English versions of the album) describes an alien invasion of Earth of which Earthlings are unaware and is used as a metaphor for the band traveling the world. Matsuri, wanting to fully utilize Hettsu's voice, composed the song like a Hettsu solo project and thought it would be unexpected to have it be fully-programmed. Upon hearing the demo, which included the line "everybody on Earth," Hettsu thought the song had an alien theme, but found the lyrics difficult to write. Hettsu believed the song's rap feel required rap vocals and wanted to include "별" (byeol), Korean for "star," because the music also reminded her of K-pop. Hettsu likens this to seeing light from a distant star whose fate is unknown on Earth. Matsuri thought it would be funny if this song, which was unusual for the band, became a hit on TikTok only for people to discover their true style.

"Tousou" (titled "Run Away" in English versions of the album) is about a high-speed police chase with lyrics inspired by detective dramas, such as Police24 O'Clock, Bayside Shakedown, and Abunai Deka, and the movie Catch Me If You Can. Matsuri added the opening siren to be playful and sampled the sound from a newscast from a free site. The music video was shot with expensive cameras tied around the waists of the members, running and singing slowly with the footage lad sped up. Hettsu's explosion in the video is a reference to the ending of a Drifters skit. This was the first song recorded by with drummer Chika.

"If you keep repeating the same structure, people will think, let's just listen to the first song and move on, but if the structure keeps changing and the song ends quickly, you'll be on the second song before you know it."

— Hettsu, on Hanabie's unconventional song structures, Headbang Magazine

"Pardon Me I Have to Go Now" uses Japanese instruments and phrases, such as "Suremasu" which is used by Anya in the anime Spy x Family, and named after a phrase used when confronting aggressive coworkers in an office setting. The choreography in the video was improvised by a make-up artist when the director requested dance moves in which Hettsu plays a chore person, Matsuri plays the sister who enjoys working overtime, and Yukina plays the "peko peko sister", even though none of the members had experience working as office ladies. "Today's Good Day & So Epic" is the first Hanabie song composed in a major key and was written to end the album on a happy note. Named after Good Day, the band's agency, and Epic, the band's label, Yukina added "epic" after learning its meaning, but worried her agency or label would disapprove. The lyrics convey the image of a concert with a circle pit around Yukina and everyone working together. The song also features vocals by Hettsu, who was asked to sing the day before recording due to Matsuri's throat problems. "Today's Good Day & So Epic" was composed with the melody first and, according to Matsuri, showcased Hanabie's punk and easycore influences, especially Chunk! No, Captain Chunk!.

== Release and promotion ==
Before the release of the album, a promotional event, "Orihime Who Ran Away," was held in July. The event was based on the song "Tousou," which was released as a single in the same month and would also be included in the album. As a part of the event, the band members hid across various locations in Tokyo, while the fans tried to find them based on hints posted on social media. The winners received event-exclusive merchandise as rewards, as well as pictures with the member,s which were also shared on the band's official X account.

Reborn Superstar! was released by Sony Music Japan under their sub-label Epic Records Japan on July 26, 2023. Two versions of the album were simultaneously released: a regular edition which only included the audio CD, and a limited edition which was shipped with a Blu-ray containing behind-the-scenes footage and interviews with the members. The album was sold through various online and offline outlets, including Amazon Japan, Rakuten Books, All Tower Record Store, Seven Net Shopping, and the band's official website. Additional rewards were included with the album based on the outlet where it was bought. In Germany, the album was released on August 26, 2023, via Century Media.

== Critical reception ==
Professional ratings
Review scores
Source	Rating
Metal.de	7/10
Metal Hammer	4/5 stars
Soundmagnet	7.5/10

Reborn Superstar! received overall positive reviews upon release, with critics praising its unique take on metalcore. Eleanor Goodman of Metal Hammer, pointing to the fusion metalcore sound of Hanabie, remarked: "Mashing furious, stomping metalcore with dizzy electronica and fun, colourful aesthetics, Hanabie are the breath of fresh air metal needs." While Metal.de commented upon the album's colorful aesthetics and intense metalcore sound remarking "Hanabie underpin their Japano madness with crashing metalcore, Reborn Superstar! is contagious with its energy." Soundmagnet praised the album's "Harajuku-core" sound for being unconventional and innovative. Critic Susan K., while writing for Soundmagnet, also pointed out the fusion of electronic and metal elements and tempo changes in the album, drawing comparisons with Maximum the Hormone.

== Track listing ==
All lyrics are written by Yukina and Matsuri except where noted; all music is composed by Matsuri and Yukina except where noted.

Reborn Superstar! track listing
No.	Title	Lyrics	Music	Arrangement	Length
1.	"Blast Off"		Matsuri, LASTorder		1:03
2.	"Hyperdimension Galaxy" (超次元ギャラクシー)			Matsuri, Megmetal	4:44
3.	"Neet Game"			Matsuri, Naoki Itai	2:49
4.	"This Is the Year to Be a Gal" (Early Summer Version; 今年こそギャル ～初夏 ver.～)			Matsuri, Megmetal	3:14
5.	"Tales of Villain"			Matsuri, Monjoe	3:41
6.	"Warning!!"			Matsuri, Gaku Taura	3:25
7.	"I Am the Most Powerful Invader Girl in the Universe" (我は宇宙最強のインベーダーちゃんである; Me, the Ultimate Invader of the Universe)	Hettsu	Matsuri, Hettsu	Matsuri, LASTorder	1:41
8.	"Run Away" (Tousou)			Matsuri, Naoki Itai	2:51
9.	"Osaki ni Shitsurei Shimasu" (お先に失礼します。; Pardon Me, I Have to Go Now.)			Matsuri, Yuyoyuppe	3:10
10.	"Today's Good Day & So Epic"			Matsuri, Ko-hey	2:37
Total length:					29:15

== Personnel ==
Credits are adopted from the album's liner notes.

=== Hanabie. ===
- Yukina – harsh vocal, clean vocals
- Matsuri – lead guitar, rhythm guitar, clean vocals
- Hettsu – bass guitar, clean vocals
- Chika – drums (track 1–2, 4–8, 10)

=== Other musicians ===
- Sae – drums (track 3, 9)

=== Technical personnel ===
- Megmetal – production, recording engineer, mixing (tracks 1–5, 7–10)
- Takumi Fukui – mixing (track 6)
- Hiromichi Takiguchi – mastering
- Shoichiro Inagaki – recording engineer
- Shunsuke Tareda – recording engineer
- Nobuyuki Murakami – recording engineer
- Hiroyuki Hasegawa – recording engineer

== Charts ==
Chart performance for Reborn Superstar!
Chart (2023)	Peak position
Japanese Albums (Oricon)	34
Japanese Top Albums Sales (Billboard)	24
UK Record Store Albums (OCC)	36
