= Hanabie. =

Japanese all-female metalcore band

Hanabie. 花冷え。
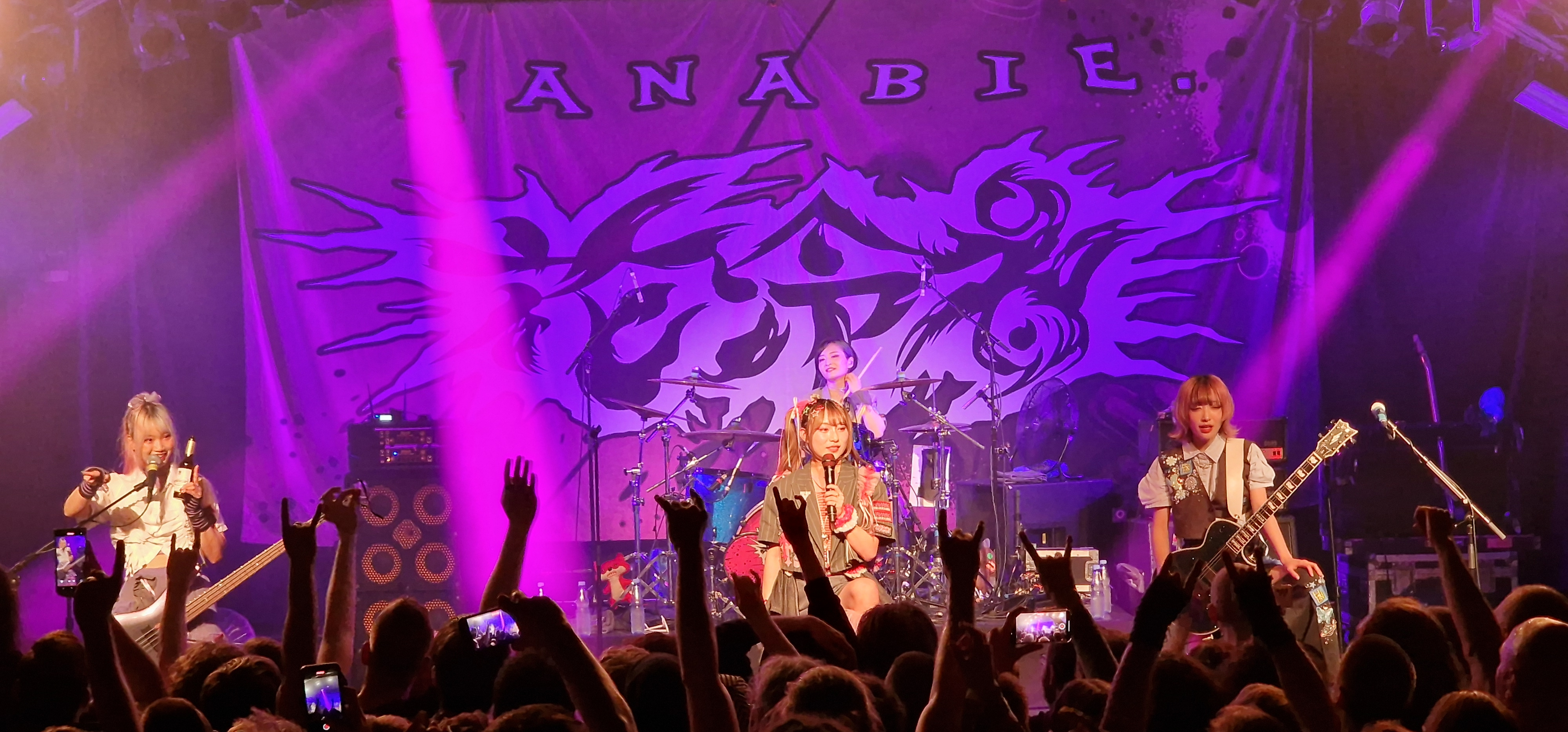
- Hanabie. performing at Markthalle Hamburg in July 2024

Background information
- Origin: Kichijōji, Tokyo, Japan
- Genres: Metalcore; nu metal; electronicore; hardcore punk
- Years active: 2015–present
- Label: Epic Records Japan
- Members: Yukina; Matsuri; Hettsu; Chika
- Past members: Kaede; Boa; Sae
- Website: Official website

Hanabie. (Japanese: 花冷え。) stylized in all caps, is a Japanese metalcore band from Tokyo, formed in 2015. The band consists of singer Yukina, guitarist/singer Matsuri, bassist Hettsu, and drummer Chika. Their music combines metalcore, hardcore punk, and nu metal, with influences from electronica, J-pop, and contemporary culture centered around Harajuku district in a style self-described as "Harajuku-core".

The band was formed by four high school friends due to their shared admiration of Maximum the Hormone, as a part of their light music club activities. Initially a cover band, they soon transitioned into writing original music, self-producing their first single in 2016. After a period as an independent band, during which they released an album and an EP, they were signed by Epic Records Japan, a subsidiary of Sony Music Japan, in 2023. In the same year, their second album Reborn Superstar! was released, reaching number 24 on Billboard Japan's weekly album charts. The success of the album led to international recognition and appearances at various music festivals outside Japan.

In 2024, Hanabie. became the first Japanese band since X Japan, as well as the first all-female Japanese band, to perform on the main stage at Lollapalooza. Their music has been featured in the DMM TV drama Kenshiro ni Yoroshiku and the Japanese variety show Kannai Devil. The band has written the opening themes of anime series Momentary Lily, Araiguma Calcal-dan, Young Ladies Don't Play Fighting Games and Reincarnated as a Sword (season 2).

== History ==
=== 2015–2016: Formation and early years ===
Yukina, Matsuri, Hettsu, and Kaede attended the same middle school and high school. During their final year of junior high, Yukina decided to form a Maximum the Hormone cover band with her friends after witnessing an upperclassman perform. She discussed about joining their school's music club and forming a band with Hettsu, who was surprised that Yukina enjoyed "such indecent music". The following year, in their first year of high school, they became members of the light music club. Yukina invited Hettsu's classmate, Matsuri, to join the music club after observing her bring towels to gym class featuring the names of bands she also admired. Subsequently, they recruited Matsuri's friend and classmate Kaede, who had previously been a member of the school's brass band. Together, the four of them formed Hanabie in July 2015. Matsuri assumed the role of guitarist as she played guitar since childhood. Hettsu decided to play the bass though she had never played the instrument before, while Kaede opted for drums. Yukina chose to be the vocalist as it was the only role left.

The band name Hanabie is a Japanese word for the spring day on which the coldness of winter returns. It is a reference to the birthdays of the founding members, who were born in either spring or winter months; Matsuri, Hettsu, and Kaede were all born in December, and Yukina was born in April. The name was suggested by Kaede. The choice of a Japanese word for the band was deliberate as they felt that English band names were too common. The "。" at the end is a nod to the band Cocoa Otoko of which Yukina and Hettsu were fans of during middle school.

They soon moved on from covering Maximum the Hormone songs and started writing original music. In October 2016, the band wrote their first songs, "Crash Over" and "Sweet Killer". In December 2016, Kaede left the band to focus on her studies.

=== 2017–2019: First mini album, band contests, indie career ===
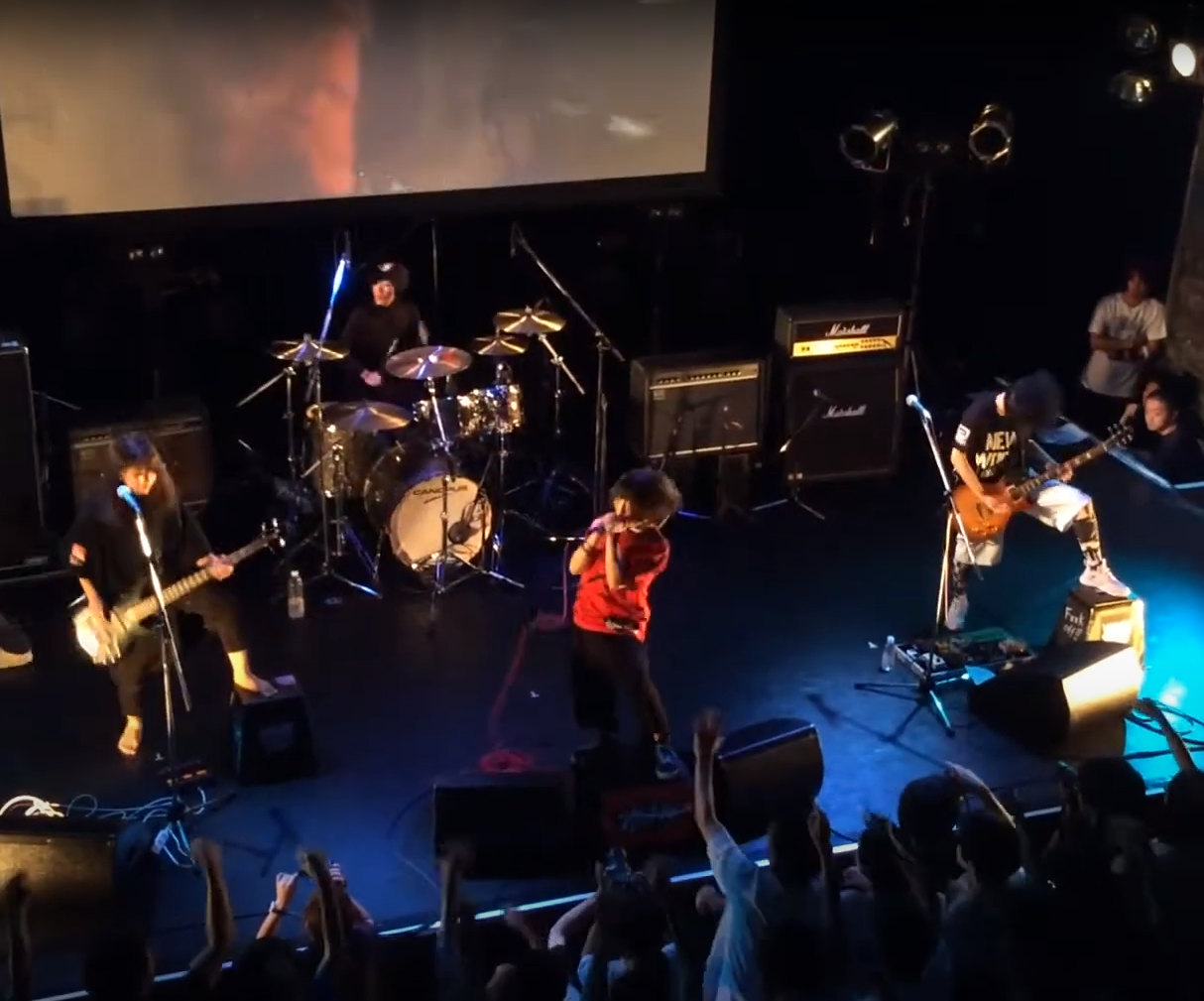
Hanabie. performing in 2017 with former drummer Boa

After discovering that high school students could perform at live houses, they reached out to the manager of Tachikawa Babel and made arrangements to perform there. Subsequently, they started performing regularly at various venues across Tokyo. Due to Kaede's departure, the band continued their activities with various support drummers. They released their third song, "Envy," in June 2017, which was sold exclusively at their live performances as a part of the "Crash Over" demo CD. In July 2017, Boa officially joined the band, having previously performed as a support drummer. In August, they took part in the national band competition "School Out", where they finished as runners-up. During the competition they caught the attention of Crystal Lake drummer Gaku Taura. Upon learning that they were searching for a recording studio, Taura offered to record their album at his studio.

In January 2018, they participated in their first three-man live event with Oshamegane and Wacality at "Shinjuku Antiknock". In August, the band entered the Japan Expo Rock contest and made it to the finals, becoming the only teenage band to do so. During this period, they contemplated quitting music due to uncertainty about their future, but Taura convinced them otherwise, believing that "these kids could be big in the future." On October 17, the band announced the release of their debut mini album, Cherry Blossoms Are Blooming, along with an accompanying tour.

Boa decided to depart from the band in September 2018, leading them to continue their live performances with the assistance of various support drummers. In November, they embarked on the "Flowering Declaration" release tour, which included shows in Shinjuku, Nagano, Osaka, Nagoya, Shizuoka, Kyoto, and Tachikawa. They also performed at "Ro Jack for Countdown Japan 18/19". Their single "L.C.G" was released in November 2019 on digital platforms, accompanied by a music video on YouTube.

=== 2020–2022: Girls Reform Manifest and indie success ===
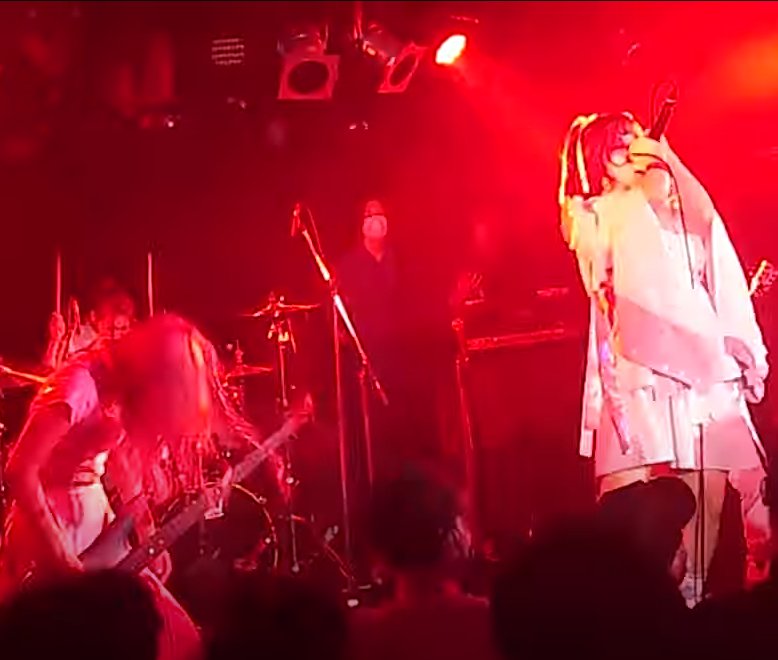
Hanabie. frequently performed at live houses in Tokyo

The band made an appearance at "Ro Jack for Rock in Japan 2020" in June 2020. In August 2020, they released "Sentimental Heroine" on different music streaming platforms, accompanied by a lyric video on YouTube. During the same month, they also announced a crowdfunding campaign to support their upcoming album. Backers were offered various rewards, with the highest tier receiving a new customized song written by the band based on their requests.

In September 2020, the band introduced Sae as their new drummer, who had previously been active in the local underground scene. In that same month, they unveiled the song "Reiwa Matching Generation". Their breakthrough came with the release of "We Love Sweets" in January 2021, which garnered over one million views on YouTube. The success of the song led to more opportunities to perform at different musical events and increased attendance at their shows. They also participated in two-man and three-man shows with bands like C-Gate and Oshamagane.

Due to the band members still being university students, they had to balance their studies, part-time jobs, and recording sessions while continuing to perform at live houses. They squeezed in shows during holidays or whenever they had time off. In 2021, the band members graduated from university. Later that year their first full album, Girls Reform Manifest, was released on 14 January 2021. An album release concert was held in the same month. In April 2022, they unveiled the single "Love♡ Ranbu", followed by "Neet Game" in August 2022, the latter of which also received a music video. After successfully establishing themselves in the indie scene of Tokyo, by 2022 they were performing at various venues in Shimokitazawa, Shibuya, Nagoya, and Shinjuku.

=== 2023–present: Reborn Superstar!, international recognition, and major record deal ===
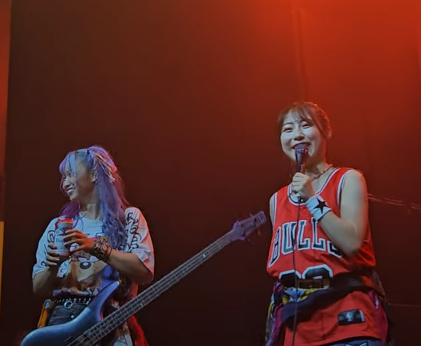
Hettsu (left) and Yukina performing during Hanabie's US tour in 2023

In January 2023, they released a new single "Pardon Me, I Have to Go Now". The success of the song attracted the attention of international promoters, with the band receiving invitations to perform at festivals in several countries including MetalDays, Leyendas del Rock, Dynamo Metalfest, Blue Ridge Rock Festival, Louder than Life, and Aftershock. Their performance at MetalDays was cancelled due to severe rainfall and flooding.

Following a period of absence from live performances, it was announced in April that Sae would be departing from the band for personal reasons. In a subsequent interview with Headbang magazine, the band members cited differences over the band's direction and personal disagreements among other reasons for Sae's departure. With an international tour approaching, the band initially considered utilizing a support drummer due to the difficulty of recruiting a new drummer on short notice. However, they ultimately opted to search for a permanent drummer to ensure a complete lineup for their major label debut. Matsuri reached out to her contacts, inquiring "We are a band in this genre, is there anyone who would be willing to do it?". Following an audition, Chika, who had previously worked as a drum instructor, was chosen for the role. She was formally introduced as the band's new drummer in May during the encore of their performance at the "Great Spring Liberation Festival 2023". In the same month, the band announced tours in Europe and the United States for summer 2023.

The band participated in the Japanese music festival Satanic Carnival in June. During the show, they revealed that they had signed with Epic Records Japan, a subsidiary of Sony Music Japan. Shortly thereafter the band's first album under their new label was also announced. In July 2023 the band was featured in the Metal Hammer Japan magazine. Also in July, the band held a promotional event in Tokyo called "Orihime Who Ran Away" to promote their upcoming album.

Their second album Reborn Superstar! was released on July 26, 2023. It received positive critical reviews and peaked at number 26 on Billboard Japan's weekly album charts. The album's release coincided with their 8th anniversary national Japan tour. Shortly thereafter the band embarked on their first European tour in August which was followed by their first US tour in September. They opened for Limp Bizkit in November. In the following month they accompanied the British metalcore band While She Sleeps on their Asia tour, as an opening act.

A new single "Otaku Lovely Densetsu" was released on January 13, 2024. In the same month they commenced on "Hajimete no Lovely Legend 2-man Japan Tour". The band's second European and North American tours were announced in February with Left to Suffer and Outline in Color as supporting acts. The tour would include appearances at Download Festival, Rock am Ring, Rock im Park, Resurrection Fest, and Full Force. In June the band announced their North American tour as an opening act for Jinjer, along with Born of Osiris. In the same month, "Oishii Survivor" was adopted as the theme song for Momentary Lily, with the song being specifically written by the band for the anime series. The band released the six-song EP Bucchigiri Tokyo in December 2024. "Oishii Survivor" was released as a single on March 12 and peaked at rank 31 on Oricon weekly single charts. "Spicy Queen" was released as a single on May 28, 2025.

On January 28, 2026, the band released a new EP, Hot Topic.

== Musical style and influences ==
=== Musical style ===
"Our style is inspired by melodic hardcore, loud rock, and metalcore. We are all huge fans of Maximum the Hormone, so we decided to form a copy band. We all have different musical roots and mixed them, which became our current music style."

— Hanabie. on their origins and influences

Hanabie.'s music can be broadly classified as metalcore albeit with influences from various musical styles. Music critic Katarina McGinn opines that the band "incorporates as many different outside influences from a variety of genres along with the metalcore backbone to make a slurry that feels as inventive as it does abrasive". In addition to metalcore, elements from nu metal, hardcore punk, electronica, EDM, and Japanese hyperpop have been observed in their music by Metal Hammer. Their tongue-in-cheek lyricism and genre defying compositions share an aesthetic with Maximum the Hormone, whom they used to cover in their early days. Most of the band's songs have a backdrop of heavy power chord-based riffs and feature breakdowns, but usually lack guitar solos, with "Envy" and "Be the GAL" being the only two of their songs to feature such. Some of their songs follow non-traditional, non-linear structures with no repeating verse or chorus. Vocals alternate between screaming and clean singing. They have been characterized as similar to Bring Me the Horizon by knotfest.com. Metal Hammer magazine has compared their music to Maximum the Hormone, Enter Shikari, and Crossfaith.

=== Songwriting ===
Hanabie. songs are mostly written by Matsuri and Yukina. Matsuri is the band's primary music composer and is also involved in arrangements. The lyrical theme of each song is written by Yukina based on Matsuri's instrumental demos. Yukina and Matsuri write melodies and lyrics for their respective vocal parts. Hettsu usually only writes the bass lines but has also occasionally written lyrics. Drum sections have been composed by Matsuri during the absence of a permanent drummer. Being the sole guitarist, Matsuri switches between rhythm and lead parts which she loosely writes in a 2:1 ratio. Screaming and clean vocals constitute roughly equal portions of their songs.

=== Influences ===
Want to Tie-Up
The tenth song from the album Girl's Reform Manifest, demonstrates the influence of metalcore, hardcore, and melodic hardcore. The dueling vocals, metalcore guitar riffs, and double bass drumming are staples of the band's music.

Yukina cites Maximum the Hormone, A Crowd of Rebellion, Hysteric Panic, and Ellegarden as her influences. Matsuri has stated her musical tastes were influenced by her parents, both of whom are fans of rock and metal music. She cites Maximum the Hormone, Hi-Standard, Hysteric Panic, SiM, and Coldrain as her influences. Hettsu cites anime songs as her biggest influences. Chika cites One Ok Rock, Sekai no Owari, and Spitz as her musical roots. Vocaloid and electronic music popular on Nico Nico Douga have also been cited as influences by the band members. All of the members have admitted to being fans of anime and video games, influences of which can be seen in their music, album covers, and music videos.

== Image ==
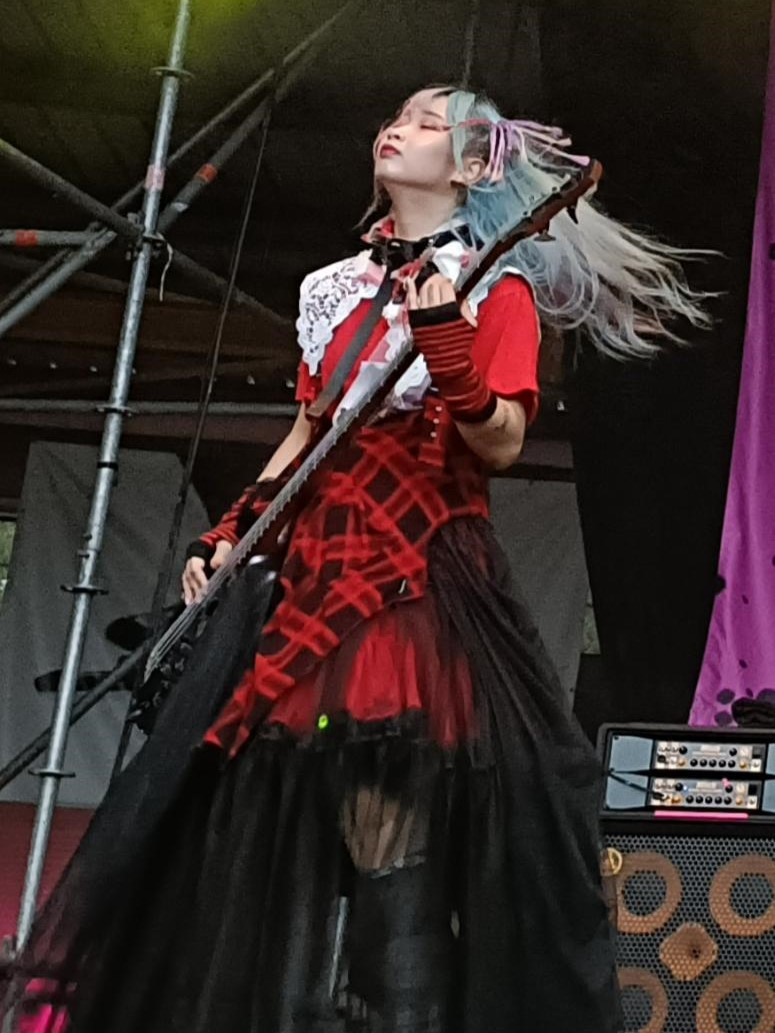
Hettsu (pictured in 2023) performing in a Harajuku street fashion inspired outfit

Hanabie. has been noted for their Gen-Z image of "authenticity, relaxation, and messiness" by Metal Hammer magazine. The band has often addressed Gen-Z issues in their lyrics. Contemporary Japanese culture and fashion centered around the Akihabara and Harajuku districts of Tokyo are a notable part of the band's image. The term "Harajuku-core" was originally coined by the band's overseas fans and they have since adopted it themselves. Furthermore, the group has incorporated elements from various subcultures including Gal and Otaku culture among others. Anime imagery is frequently used by them and features of all of their albums covers as well as much of their merchandise. The band's outfits are designed by Hettsu, who also makes some of them herself.

Prior to 2019 the band had a more casual dressed-down look. According to Matsuri, "We didn't want to be underestimated. Back then, the metalcore scene consisted of a lot of skinny black jeans. Skinny black jeans, white T, no smile. We tried replicating that for a bit as best we could." But eventually they decided to change their look to differentiate themselves from other similar bands.

== Members ==
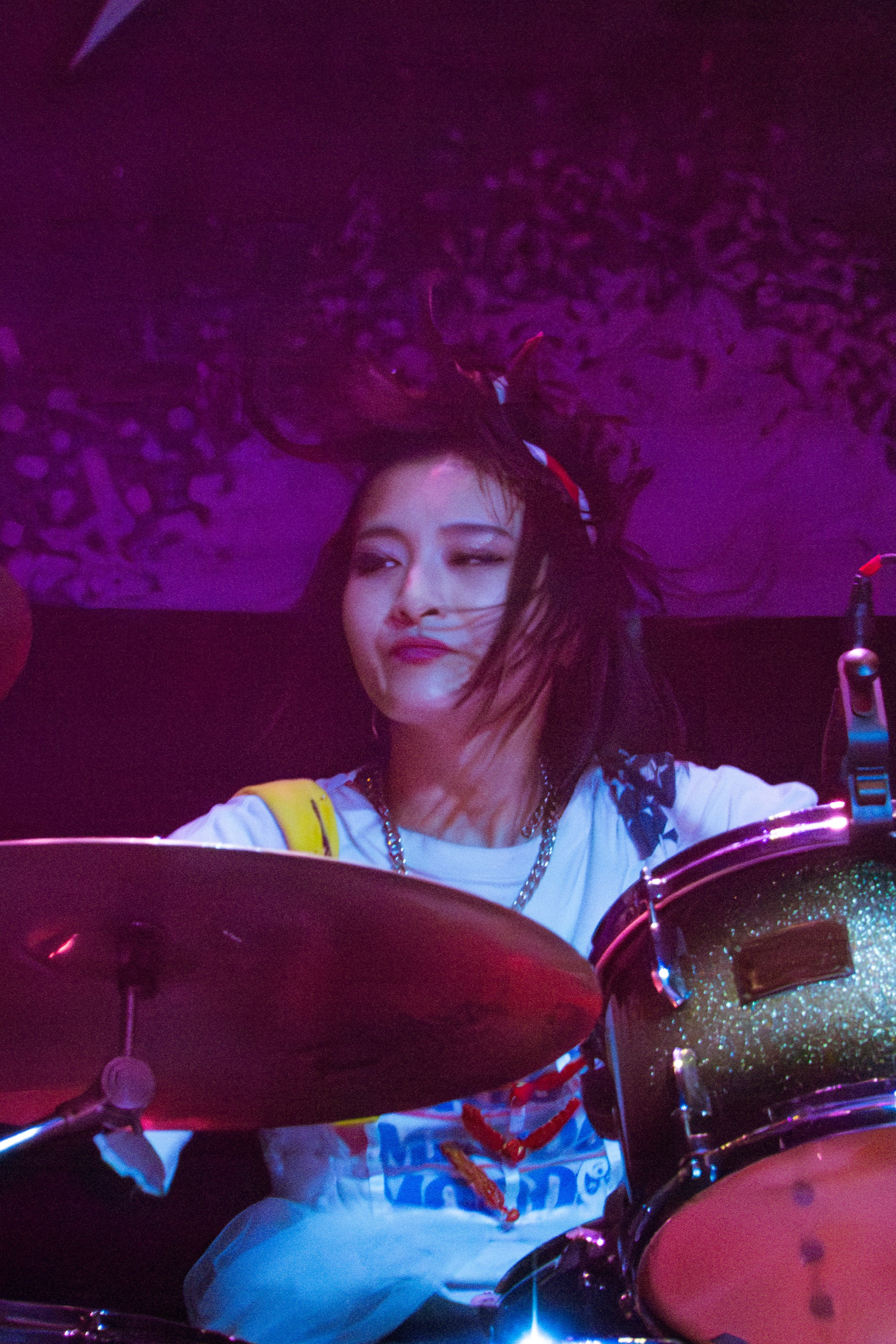
Chika

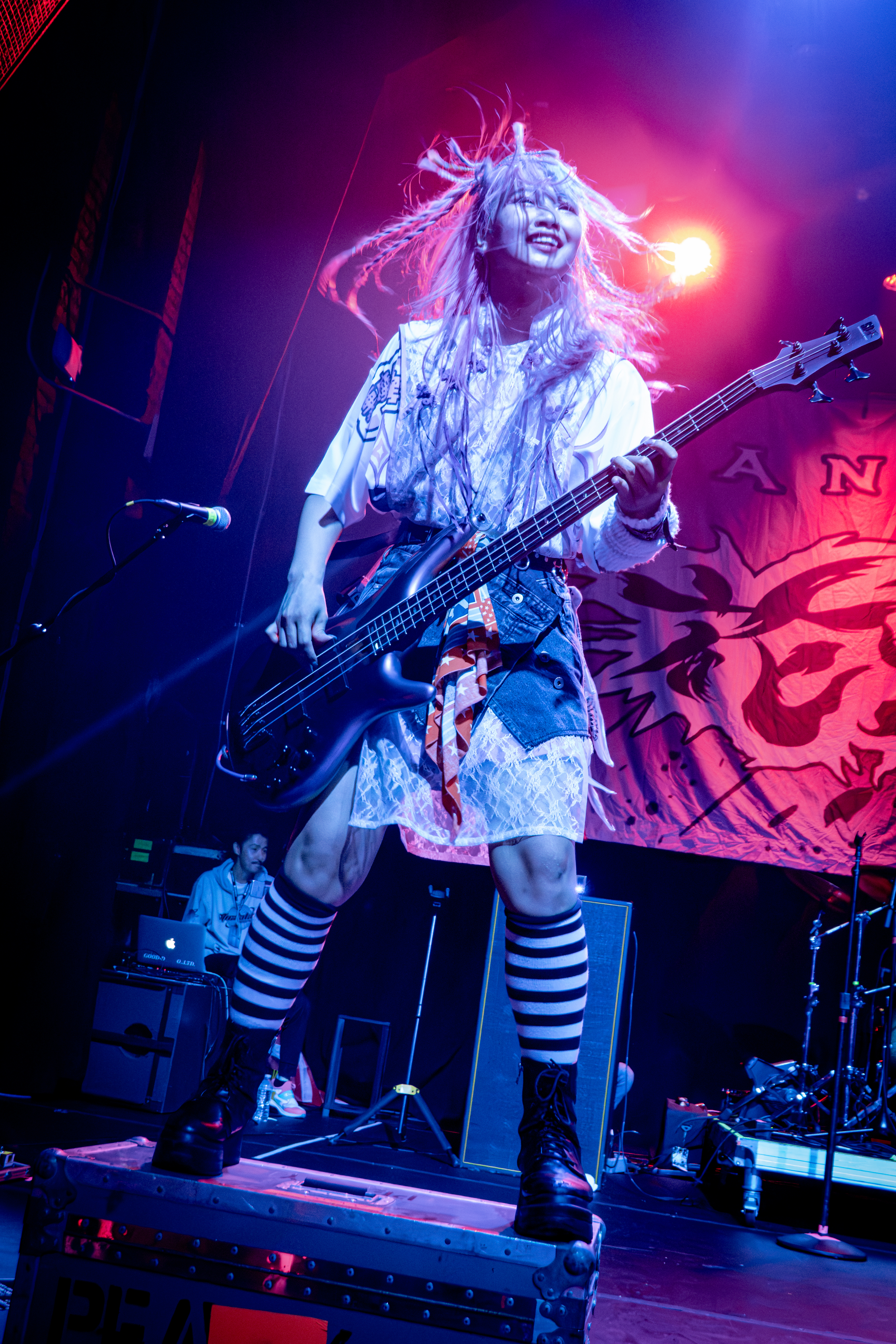
Hettsu

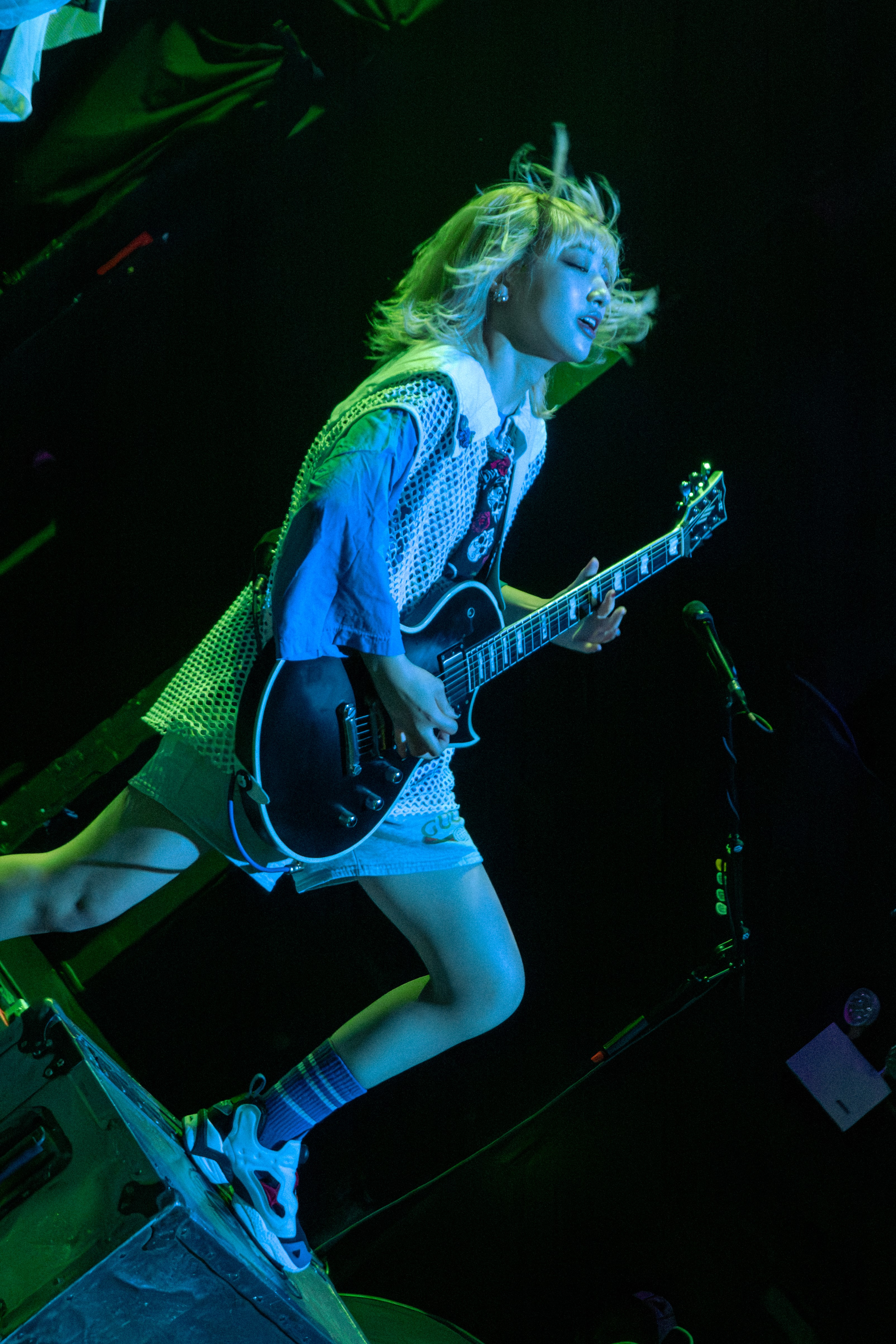
Matsuri

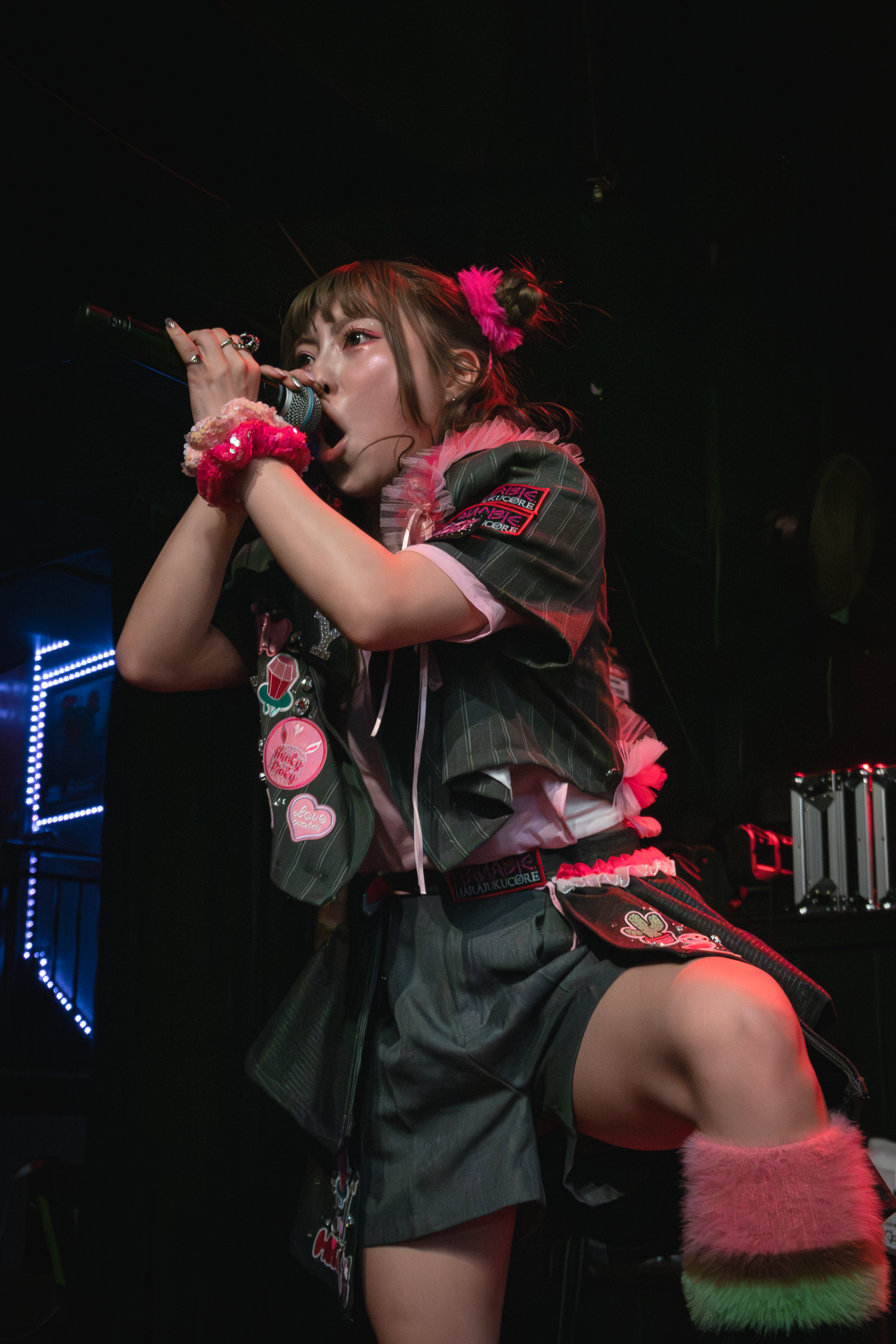
Yukina

=== Current members ===
- Yukina – lead vocals (2015–present)
- Matsuri – guitar, vocals (2015–present)
- Hettsu – bass, backing vocals (2015–present)
- Chika – drums (2023–present)

=== Past members ===
- Kaede – drums (2015–2016)
- Boa – drums (2017–2018)
- Sae – drums (2020–2023)

== Discography ==
=== Studio albums ===
- Girl's Reform Manifest (2021)
- Reborn Superstar! (2023)
- Umami (2026)

=== EPs ===
- Cherry Blossoms Are Blooming (2018)
- Bucchigiri Tokyo (2024)
- Hot Topic (2026)

=== Singles ===
List of singles
Title	Year	Album
"Crash Over"	2016	Non-album single
"L.C.G."	2019	Girl's Reform Manifest
"Love Ranbu" (Love乱舞)	2022	Non-album single
"Neet Game"	2022	Reborn Superstar!
"Osaki ni Shitsurei Shimasu"	2023	Reborn Superstar!
"Run Away" (Tousou)	2023	Reborn Superstar!
"This Is the Year to Be a Gal" (Early Summer version)	2023	Reborn Superstar!
"Believer" (Imagine Dragons cover)	2023	Non-album single
"Otaku Lovely Densetsu"	2024	Bucchigiri Tokyo
"Girl's Talk"	2024	Hot Topic
"Metamorphose!"	2024	Bucchigiri Tokyo
"Tasty Survivor"	2025	Non-album single
"Spicy Queen"	2025	Hot Topic
"Karu Garu Everyday!"	2025	Non-album single
"Iconic"	2026	Hot Topic

== Tours ==
=== Japan ===
- I've Kept You Waiting! First One-Man Tour for the 8th Anniversary of Our Formation!! (2023)
- Hajimete no Lovely Legend 2-man Japan Tour (2024)
- Bucchigiri Japan Tour (2024)

=== Overseas ===
- Hanabie. EU Tour (2023)
- Hanabie. US Tour (2023)
- Hanabie Europe Tour (2024)
