= Kadin Island =

Island in Alaska, United States

Coordinates: 56°31′44″N 132°27′27″W

Kadin Island is an island in the Alaska Panhandle of southeastern Alaska. It is located in the mouth of the Stikine River, 7 km (4 mi) NW of Wrangell Island, Alexander Archipelago.

Kadin Island is 3.5 km (2 mi) in length. The highest point on the island is 1,810 ft (550 m) above sea level. It belongs administratively to the City and Borough of Wrangell.

This island was named in 1863 by the surveyors of the Russian corvette Rynda after pilot Mikhail Kadin, an Aleut born in Atka, who was also a member of the surveying party. Kadin drew the charts in the Tebenkov atlas, along with Kozma Terentev in Sitka between 1848 and 1850.
