= Bucchigiri Tokyo =

EP by Hanabie.
- Released: December 4, 2024
- Genre: Metalcore; electronicore
- Length: 17:41
- Language: Japanese
- Label: Epic Records Japan

Hanabie. chronology
Reborn Superstar! (2023)	Bucchigiri Tokyo (2024)	Hot Topic (2026)

Bucchigiri Tokyo (Japanese: ぶっちぎり東京, Hepburn: Bucchigiri Tokyo) is the second extended play by Japanese metalcore band Hanabie, released on December 4, 2024 by Epic Records Japan, a subsidiary of Sony Music Japan. It is the first record the band co-wrote with drummer Chika, who had joined during the latter stages of production of their previous release Reborn Superstar!. The EP entered Billboard Japan's weekly album charts at #33 and peaked at #3 on Oricon's weekly rock album chart. The song "Ito Okashi My Type" was highlighted as one of the best releases of its week by Kerrang!.

== Background ==
On August 7, 2024, Hanabie released "Metamorphose!" as a digital single. A new EP named Bucchigiri Tokyo was announced on the same day along with an accompanying national tour. In November 2024 the track list and the album cover designed by digital artist Ponko were revealed. Two of the six tracks on the EP were previously released as singles.

== Writing and composition ==
All songs on the album were written by Yukina and Matsuri, with the exception of track 6 which was solely written by Matsuri. The EP is centered around the theme of returning to one's roots, and the title references the band's home city of Tokyo.

The title track "Bucchigiri Tokyo" opens with a punk inspired riff. According to an interview published in Billboard Japan, Matsuri composed the music for the song after watching a Green Day performance at a European music festival. The second track "Metamorphose!" is based on superheroes and was influenced by the anime Purikyua, specifically “the cuteness and powerfulness” of the show, which Yukina watched as a child. The third track "Otaku Lovely Densetsu" combines the band's erratic metalcore style with EDM samples and pop sensibilities. lyrically themed around Japanese otaku sub-culture. In an interview with Revolver, Yukina stated "I wanted to write a song to express my gratitude to all the fans, staff, and bands that I met and played with on our world tour, and to express what I felt on the tour. One of the things I felt was 'Japanese culture, such as anime and video games, is truly loved'! We love Japanese culture, but not only about Japanese culture, this is a chaotic and Harajuku-core-like song that makes you think it’s cool to be faithful and straight up to what you like."

This is a song that goes back to our roots. I didn't add any decorations such as synths, I didn't ask for an arranger, and I made it with just the members. In 2018, we released our first EP called "Cherry Blossoms are Blooming", and we wanted it to be a song that would stick with people who liked songs from that era.

— Matsuri on the song 'Gambler', Ototoy.jp

The 4th track "Gambler" is about Hanabie's early days as an independent band in the Tokyo underground scene when they performed at venues like Shinjuku Antiknock. The band, in an Ototoy Japan interview, explained that as struggling musicians they felt like "gamblers" as they faced an uncertain future. After graduating from high school the band members were unsure about continuing as a band. While talking about the song in Kerrang!, Yukina stated " Doing a band is like a gamble, especially right out of high school or college… We had many, many paths we could choose, like having a job, or continuing with the band, and we bet everything on this band." In a separate interview with Billboard Japan, Matsuri said that they wanted to make the song sound closer to the band's early sound.

The fifth track "Ito Okashi My Type" is about people who get obsessed with modern trends like online personality tests. The sixth track "Bonus Guilty Time" is the first song by the band to feature Chika on vocals. The song is intended to sound like "I Am the Most Powerful Invader Girl in the Universe" from the band's previous album, but due to Chika's hesitation to sing she asked her to rap instead. While recording, Chika pointed out that her vocals were a bit rhythmically off and asked if they should re-record it, but Matsuri decided to keep it as she felt these imperfections gave the song a unique personality.

== Critical reception ==
Bucchigiri Tokyo received positive critical reviews upon release. According to JRock News, "Overall, Bucchigiri Tokyo marks a noticeable yet subtle step toward maturity in HANABIE.’s sound. While the shift isn’t drastic, this evolution gives the music a greater sense of cohesion while still delivering the playful, high-energy vibe that has made HANABIE. so beloved.". Amped remarked, "Bucchigiri Tokyo marks an exciting evolution, delivering relentless heaviness, soaring clean vocals, and dynamic synths that push their sound to bold new heights."

== Track listing ==
All lyrics are written by Yukina, Matsuri; all music is composed by Matsuri, Yukina except where noted.

No.	Title	Lyrics	Music	Arrangement	Length
1.	"Bucchigiri Tokyo" (ぶっちぎり東京)			Matsuri, Yuyoyuppe	2:41
2.	"Metamorphose!" (メタ盛るフォーゼ！)			Matsuri, LASTorder	3:23
3.	"Otaku Lovely Densetsu" (O・TA・KUラブリー伝説)			Matsuri, LASTorder	3:11
4.	"Gambler"			Matsuri	3:30
5.	"Ito Okashi My Type" (いとをかしMyType)			Matsuri, LASTorder	3:07
6.	"Bonus Guilty Time" (ボーナス☆ぎるてぃたいむ)	Matsuri	Matsuri	Matsuri	1:51
Total length:					17:43

== Personnel ==
=== Hanabie. ===
- Yukina – harsh vocals, clean vocals
- Matsuri – lead guitar, rhythm guitar, clean vocals
- Hettsu – bass guitar, clean vocals
- Chika – drums, vocals in "Bonus Guilty Time"

== Charts ==
Chart performance for Bucchigiri Tokyo
Chart (2023)	Peak position
Japanese Albums (Oricon)	36
Japanese Albums (Billboard Japan)	33
Japanese Rock Albums (Oricon)	3
