= Tingyun =

Video game character

- Honkai character
- Official artwork
- First game: Honkai: Star Rail (2023)
- Voiced by: English: Laci Morgan (2023–2024); Anya Floris (2024–present); Chinese: Jiang Li; Japanese: Yūki Takada; Korean: Lee Myeong-ho

In-universe information
- Species: Foxian
- Weapon: Fan
- Origin: The Xianzhou Luofu
- Types: Lightning, Fire
- Paths: Harmony, Nihility (combat); Destruction (lore)

Tingyun (Chinese: 停云; pinyin: Tíngyún) is a character from the video game Honkai: Star Rail, developed by miHoYo. Tingyun is a foxian, a species that mostly resembles humans, except that they live longer and have the ears and tail of a fox. In the lore, Tingyun is an "amicassador", a position responsible for trade, of the starship called the Xianzhou Luofu. Tingyun was possessed and subsequently attacked by the antagonistic Lord Ravager, Phantylia, and was incorrectly presumed dead. She recovered from this with help from Ruan Mei, but lost her identity as Tingyun. She was released in version 1.0 of the game.

In version 2.7, Tingyun was released as a separate playable character called Fugue (忘归人; Wàngguīrén; 'the one who forgot to return'). Tingyun was received positively, with critics praising her role in the story and speculating whether she had died before Fugue was released. Her gameplay was also well received.

== Design and voice acting ==
Tingyun made her first appearance in the game in version 1.0, alongside the game's release, on April 26, 2023. In the game, it was revealed that she was an "amicassador" of the Whistling Flames, a merchant guild operating under the Sky-Faring Commission of the Xianzhou Alliance. Her position deals largely with trade issues on the Xianzhou starships. She uses a fan to assert her authority and solve conflicts, but she generally tries to solve these issues using her words first. In the story, Tingyun suffers a near-death experience due to a catastrophe. In addition, it is revealed that her identity and face had been stolen.

Tingyun received a five-star form in version 2.5 of the game under the name Fugue, which first appeared as a non-player character. Tingyun is Fugue's past self; she was brought back from the brink of death by Ruan Mei and henceforth identified as Fugue. Fugue is described as a tactful foxian whose identity has been stolen. On December 17, 2024, miHoYo released a video explaining Fugue's combat abilities. Two days later, the developers released a trailer exploring Fugue's lore and identity entitled "Unlike a Floating Cloud". A trailer for Fugue entitled "Wordless" was released on December 23, 2024. Fugue was released two days later in version 2.7 of the game.

Tingyun and Fugue are both voiced in Chinese by Jiang Li, in Japanese by Yūki Takada, and in Korean by Lee Myeong-ho. They were originally voiced in English by Laci Morgan, but she was replaced in version 2.7 of the game in December 2024 by Anya Floris. In an interview, Takada said that she was happy the players could meet Tingyun again in the form of Fugue, and she recalled that Tingyun was on the verge of losing her identity on the Xianzhou Luofu. Takada believed that Tingyun experienced many changes during the process of being saved by Ruan Mei.

== Appearances ==
The Trailblazer, the game's protagonist, first sees Tingyun shortly after landing on the Xianzhou Luofu and rescuing her from a group of soldiers corrupted with a curse known as mara, which results in loss of sanity for the afflicted. Tingyun introduces herself to them and takes the group to meet Yukong, a local official who is dealing with the crisis posed by a Stellaron, a highly destructive entity. The group also meets Jing Yuan, a respected general who entrusts them with capturing the Stellaron Hunter Kafka, who is also on the Xianzhou. After searching for a while, the group realizes Kafka had been intentionally placing clues to try and lead them to her the entire time, resulting in a chase. Kafka is arrested by Fu Xuan of the Divination Commission. Tingyun accompanies the group in walking to Exalting Sanctum (where Kafka's interrogation takes place), saying she cannot find a direct entrance to the Divination Commission from there. At the Alchemy Commission, they find evidence of a brutal battle, prompting Tingyun to explain that the Abundance and the Xianzhou Luofu do not have a good relationship. It is revealed that the Disciples of Sanctus Medicus, a secret pro-Abundance cult that embraces immortality, are responsible for the recent surge in mara cases. They have weaponized the Elixir Crucibles' smoke by infusing it with "medicine" that triggers mara. Fu Xuan asks the Trailblazer and their companions to clear the smoke, since it specifically affects long-life Xianzhou natives. When the Disciples' leader, Dan Shu, calls on the person who brought the Stellaron to the Xianzhou Luofu, "Tingyun" is revealed to be an impostor, the Lord Ravager Phantylia, who appears to snap Tingyun's neck before vanishing. Welt suggests that the real Tingyun may still be alive because the body disappeared rather than being left behind. The crew then follows Phantylia and defeats her eventually.

Official artwork of Fugue

The real Tingyun's consciousness drifted in darkness, unable to speak for a while. She eventually awakens in a laboratory run by Ruan Mei, a member of the Genius Society who is overseeing Tingyun's recovery. Ruan Mei tells Tingyun that her body bears scars from Phantylia's actions and that Tingyun must learn to change quickly; her tail has changed color as well. She gradually heals from her injuries. Eventually, Ruan Mei tells Tingyun the truth about what Phantylia did while disguised as her: causing calamity and poisoning the living with mara. Tingyun realizes that Phantylia not only stole her life, but her identity. Tingyun realizes that her fate was now tied to the Astral Express and decides to leave her old identity behind, concealing the news of her survival. The Xianzhou arc ends with a brief funeral-like ceremony for Tingyun, with its inhabitants unaware she is still alive. On the planet of Penacony, it is revealed that Tingyun's survival left her physically scarred and psychologically fragmented, but also gives her a chance to reclaim her identity by forming a bond with the Astral Express. After reuniting with Yukong, who helped raise her as a child, she decides not to simply return home, but to use the Destruction's marks on her body as an advantage against the enemies of the Xianzhou. Later, in Planarcadia, Tingyun goes undercover with an assassin to investigate a gang known as the Synwish Syndicate and Blade's connection to the Phantasmoon Games, but the mission escalates when Sunday is made a participant in those games. (Note: The Phantasmoon Games are a phenomenon that occurs in Planarcadia in which the Aeon of Elation, Aha, offers the winner the power of Elation for one minute, and they can do with it as they see fit.)

=== Gameplay ===
Tingyun is a four-star Lightning-damage dealer who walks the Path of the Harmony. Her Basic Attack deals Lightning damage to a single enemy. Her Skill grants an ally the Benediction status effect to one ally and increases that ally's ATK. The next three times that ally attacks, they will deal additional Lightning damage. Tingyun's ultimate grants 50 units of energy to the ally and increases their damage dealt for two turns. Her Talent is such that when Tingyun attacks an enemy, the ally with Benediction immediately deals additional Lightning damage to the same enemy.

Fugue is considered a separate character from Tingyun for combat purposes. Fugue is a five-star Fire damage dealer who walks the Path of the Nihility. Her regular Basic Attack deals Fire damage to a single enemy, and her enhanced Basic Attack does the same except it also damages adjacent targets. Her Skill grants a single designated ally the Foxian Prayer status and enters the Torrid Scorch state, which lasts for three turns. During that state, the ally with the Foxian Prayer status increases their Break Effect stat and can also reduce an enemy's Toughness. In the Torrid Scorch state, Fugue also enhances her Basic Attack; whenever an ally with Foxian Prayer attacks, Fugue reduces the attacked enemy's defense for two turns. Fugue's ultimate deals Fire damage to all enemies, reducing all enemies' Toughness. While on the battlefield, her Talent afflicts enemies with the Cloudflame Luster effect equal to a percentage of their maximum Toughness; when Cloudflame Luster is reduced to zero, the enemy will receive Weakness Break damage.

== Promotion ==
In February 2024, it was announced that miHoYo would be collaborating with Myethos Gift, a Chinese company, to release a figure of Tingyun in September that year. The figure cost CN¥199; some commenters on the official announcement on Weibo were shocked at the price. Others wondered whether miHoYo would ever release similar figures for male characters, and still others posted comments about whether Tingyun's in-game fate would be revealed.

== Reception ==
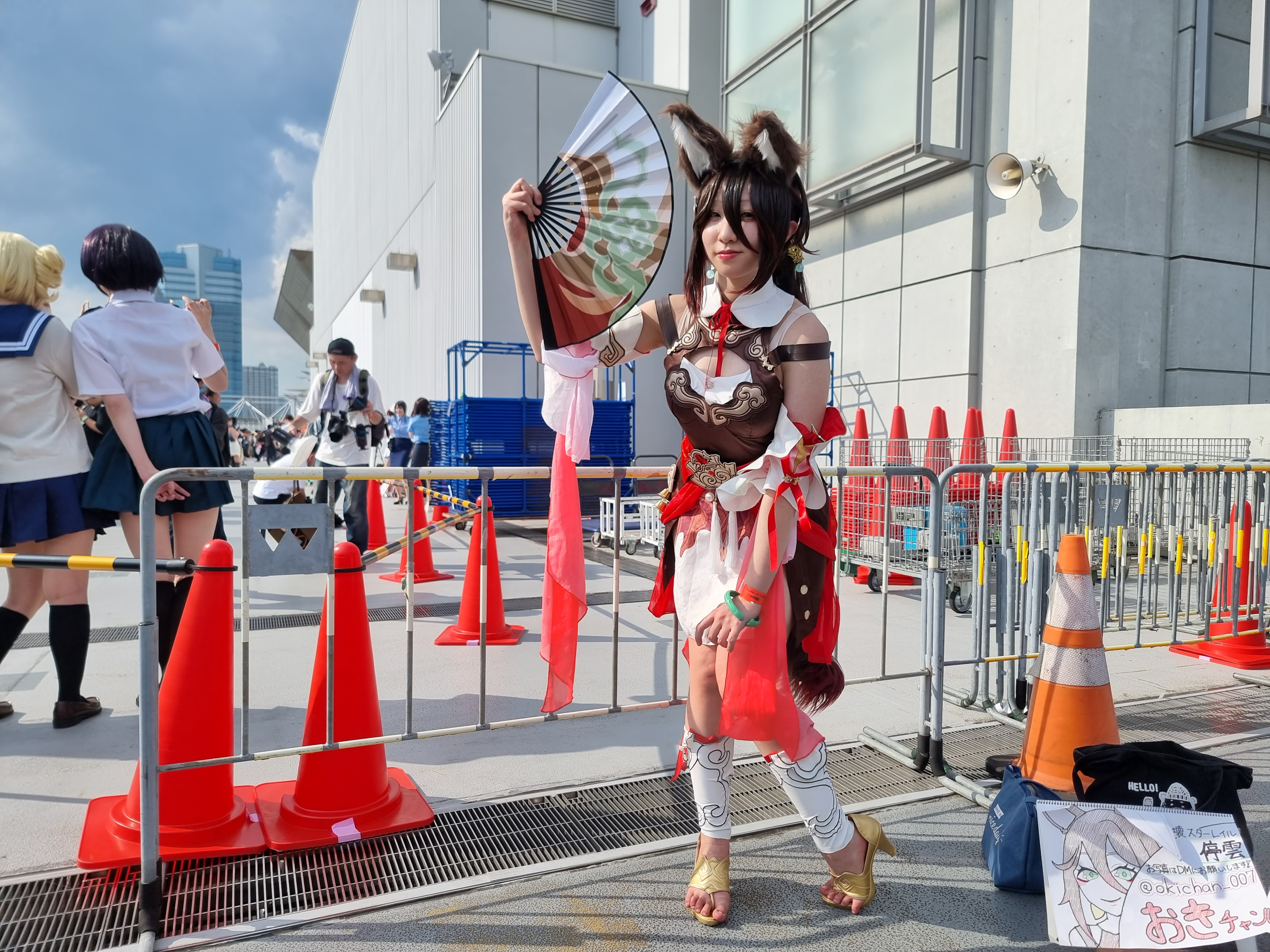
Cosplay of Tingyun

Tingyun was generally received well upon release, as was Fugue. Players expressed their love for the character through cosplay. By December 4, 2024, Honkai: Star Rail reached the top 10 in revenue in many regions including the United States, Japan, and South Korea. Around the same time, the game's overseas revenue doubled, ranking fifth out of all Chinese games in terms of foreign revenue that month.

=== Story ===
Tingyun's role in the story was generally well received. Writing for Siliconera, Jenni Lada described Tingyun as a "steadfast guide" who was always there to help people if they needed it. She wrote that Tingyun's part in the story seemed relatively small at first, as she mainly offered players guidance into the Xianzhou Luofu. The turning point, Lada writes, is when Fu Xuan tasked the Trailblazer with taking care of the Elixir Crucibles, since only short-life species are able to be around them. Long-life species such as foxians are afflicted with mara if they get too close. Lada wrote that the truth about who the Trailblazer was really interacting with was only revealed when Tingyun shrugged off requests by March 7th and Welt to stay back for her own safety, stating that this was a red flag. She described the reveal as well-handled in that it does not draw out that "Tingyun" acted strangely at first; doing so would be out of line, as she was a new character. She wrote that in past missions the Trailblazer had seen that anyone could be a secret member of the Disciples of Sanctus Medicus, but players did not have much reason to believe someone as close as Tingyun could be among them. She did concede that Tingyun could still have been genuine because of her dedication in helping the Trailblazer. Lada described the moment where Tingyun's neck was snapped as "so jarring that it changes everything" and sets the tone for what comes next. Bruno Yonezawa of Screen Rant agreed in that the scene in which Tingyun's neck is snapped was among the game's most shocking; writer Freedom Yamanaka of Famitsu thought that many people felt similarly. Writer Taro of UDN speculated that Tingyun was fake as well, but indicated that this was because of an earlier text message she sends to the Trailblazer about immortality. Taro also argued it was unlikely Tingyun had been brainwashed by Phantylia.

Yonezawa said it was risky for the game to kill off characters, and that Tingyun was treated as if she was really dead for the time being. He wrote that her supposed death showed that the game was ready to let players get emotionally invested in its story, and that "not everyone is safe" from death. Even if set in a fantasy world, stories and characters improve and become much more relatable when death is involved. Deaths such as Tingyun's stimulate players' emotional involvement by causing attachment followed by grief, he argued. Taro speculated that not all hope was lost for Tingyun, saying that other characters such as Blade had shown in past missions that the mara-struck disease's power can be contained. Since the character Luocha follows the Abundance, they also suggested there was a high probability of him being able to help Tingyun. Lada theorized that the real Tingyun was in fact alive and safe because the Tingyun who had been accompanying the Trailblazer was a fake vessel, and correctly speculated that a five-star version of her would later be released. Freedom Yamanaka was happy to see that Tingyun was alive, but incorrectly guessed that Ruan Mei had resurrected her from the dead, as opposed to preventing her from dying in the first place. In version 2.7 of the game, there is a scene in which Tingyun's memories are split into many small parts. By talking to different memory fragments, players interact with different aspects of Tingyun, such as her love of food.

Critics discussed Fugue primarily in relation to Tingyun's identity and return after Phantylia impersonated her. Before Fugue's release, Freedom Yamanaka questioned what it meant for Tingyun to be stripped of her appearance, name and status, and they also speculated about the fact that Fugue has more than one tail, unlike Tingyun who only has one; they wondered if this was the price she paid. Jackie Arias of Game Rant mentioned that in psychiatry, the word "fugue" means loss of awareness of one's own identity and that it is often associated with hysteria and epilepsy. She suggested that Ruan Mei was attempting to help Tingyun recover, and that this could be related to the name "Fugue". Taro described the real Tingyun's text messaging style as "lively and cute", and compared it to the impostor's addressing of the Trailblazer as "benefactor".

=== Trailer and gameplay ===
Tingyun's gameplay was also positively received. Lada noted that she was a popular character due to the amount of energy she gives other characters. Critics praised her utility as a support character; Christian Vaz of PCGamesN described her as one of the game's best, citing her damage buffs, energy regeneration and ability to function without consuming Skill Points, which allowed for greater team flexibility. Nahda Nabiilah of Game Rant similarly called Tingyun an "excellent support" and one of the game's best, while Josh Broadwell of VG247 described her as a strong support who could fit into many teams and help wear down enemy break meters, though not as a main source of Lightning damage. He later wrote that Fugue's role as a break-focused support made sense in light of what happened to Tingyun in the story.

== See also ==
- Sayori – Character in the 2017 visual novel Doki Doki Literature Club!
- Kitsune – Fox spirit in Japanese folklore that can shapeshift
