= The Xianzhou Luofu =

Fictional spaceship in Honkai: Star Rail

- Honkai location
- Aurum Alley, one of the prominent locations on the Xianzhou Luofu, which functions as a trade and commercial hub
- Created by: miHoYo
- Based on: Ancient China

In-universe information
- Type: Spaceship
- Ruled by: Ten-Lords Commission
- Races: Xianzhou Natives; Foxians; Vidyadhara
- Characters: List
- Path: The Hunt

The Xianzhou Luofu (Chinese: 仙舟「罗浮」; pinyin: Xiānzhōu "Luófú"; lit. 'Fairy Boat Luofu') is a location in the video game Honkai: Star Rail, developed by miHoYo. It is part of the Xianzhou Alliance, an ancient space-faring civilization composed of massive ships that follow the godlike Aeon, Lan. Originally setting sail to find an elixir of immortality, they now wage an eternal war to eradicate the antagonistic Abominations of Abundance.

Critical reception to the Xianzhou Luofu storyline was mixed, but commentators broadly praised its world-building for seamlessly blending traditional Chinese culture, Taoist mythology, and folklore with futuristic science fiction to create a distinct "silkpunk" aesthetic.

== Conception and creation ==
The game development team stated that the general concept of the Xianzhou Luofu originates from the ancient Chinese legend of Qin Shihuangdi sending the explorer Xu Fu to sea to search for an elixir of immortality. One of the producers said that this wandering spirit and determination to explore the unknown resonated with the idea of navigating the cosmos in the game, so the development team decided to use this as a starting point in order to construct an Eastern fantasy world. HoYoverse indicated that the works of authors such as Arthur C. Clarke, Isaac Asimov, Robert A. Heinlein and Walter M. Miller Jr. were all used as points of inspiration when discussing design. The Xianzhou Luofu is also inspired by other Chinese legends, many of which contain stories about humanoid races that are part-dragon or part-fox, which is also one of the recurring traditional Chinese cultural themes seen on the Xianzhou. The Xianzhou Luofu in particular is inspired by the pre-Qin dynasty idea of seeking immortality. Many comparisons can be seen to Taoist mythology, as well; the names of other ships in the Xianzhou Alliance, such as Fanghu, are named after mythological celestial mountains from Taoist texts, and the Alchemy Commission draws from the traditional Taoist connection between alchemical cultivation and medical practice. The transportation system used by the Xianzhou Alliance uses spaceships called starskiffs are inspired by the xingcha (星槎; Xīng chá) space ships from Jin Dynasty Zhang Hua's Bowuzhi stories. The Ambrosial Arbor, a legendary tree on the Xianzhou Luofu which granted the people eternal life, is based on the Jianmu (建木; Jiànmù) from the Classic of Mountains and Seas.

The name "Xianzhou" references classical Chinese poetry and represents world-ship fleets navigating the cosmos. "Luofu" draws from Mount Luofu, a famous Taoist mountain and dongtian sanctuary, implying a blessed land full of wonder. Certain names associated with the Xianzhou, such as "Reignbow Arbiter" (帝弓司命; Dì gōng sī mìng; 'The Siming bow of the Huangdi') are said to evoke familiar Chinese cultural and mythological motifs as well.

The design of the Xianzhou Luofu blends traditional Chinese architectural principles with futuristic science-fiction elements to create a distinctive Eastern aesthetic. Hui Style architecture provides the visual foundation, with white walls, black tiles, horse-head gables, high-enclosing walls, upturned eaves, and staggered rooflines offering both a recognizable Jiangnan character and enough flexibility to incorporate holograms, neon lighting, spacecraft infrastructure, and other advanced technology.

The Temple of Heaven in Beijing

The Xianzhou Luofu's spatial planning similarly draws on Chinese architectural symbolism. Administrative and sacred locations, such as the Divination Commission and Fyxestroll Garden, use horizontal layouts and symmetrical axes, while Scalegorge Waterscape echoes the layout and philosophical symbolism of the real-life Temple of Heaven in Beijing. By contrast, commercial districts and transit hubs such as Aurum Alley and Starskiff Haven use asymmetrical axes, geometric lines, and linear arrangements that encourage flexibility and movement. Vertical, multi-layered construction accommodates the dense population of the Xianzhou Luofu, while classical garden techniques such as framed views and carefully placed rocks add depth and complexity to the local environment.

The Xianzhou Luofu's aesthetic can be understood through the concept of silkpunk, a term associated with the science fiction writer Ken Liu that describes the fusion of futuristic technology with ancient East Asian cultural, technological, and mythological traditions, rather than simply copying traditional Chinese themes. Instead, the game uses Hui architecture as a foundation and integrates it with the structure and technology of a massive interstellar vessel. The same design philosophy extends beyond architecture to clothing, food, transportation, and other details that reinterpret elements of Chinese civilization within a modern cultural and technological context. Traditional folk arts, such as a mahjong-inspired game known as Celestial Jade, storytelling, narrative drum singing and acrobatics also create a grounded sense of everyday life aboard the Xianzhou. The soundtrack for the Xianzhou Luofu integrates the traditional Chinese pentatonic scale and vocal techniques inspired by Dong Grand Songs.

== Lore ==
In the game, the Astral Express is a train that travels through the cosmos to connect different worlds. Its crew is contacted by Kafka, a wanted member of the Stellaron Hunters. The Stellaron Hunters are a group of criminals whose sole purpose is to hunt down Stellarons, powerful destructive objects capable of destroying planets and effecting massive changes in civilizations. Kafka asks the Astral Express crew to change course from their original destination (the planet of Penacony) and travel to the Xianzhou Luofu because a Stellaron has arrived there. The crew agrees to investigate, but Dan Heng stays behind because he has a troubled past with the Luofu. The Trailblazer (the game's protagonist) as well as fellow crew members March 7th and Welt Yang, arrive on the Luofu and find the ship under attack by soldiers affected by mara — long-lived people whose minds have been overpowered by painful memories, turning them violent. They meet Tingyun, a local trade representative, and General Jing Yuan, who asks them to capture Kafka. Meanwhile, Dan Heng changes his mind and travels to the Luofu, where he joins Luocha, a mysterious merchant, and Sushang, a member of the Xianzhou military known as the Cloud Knights.

The group eventually finds Kafka, but she allows herself to be captured because she wants Fu Xuan, the Luofu's chief diviner, to examine her memories. Fu Xuan learns that the Stellaron Hunters were not responsible for the Stellaron's presence on the Luofu. Kafka explains that someone already on the Luofu planted the Stellaron there and that the Stellaron Hunters only lured the Astral Express crew there because her superior, Elio, predicted that the Trailblazer would save the Luofu and gain a powerful new ally. Soon after, the Ambrosial Arbor begins to grow, and Kafka escapes with Blade, one of her fellow Stellaron Hunters who is also a Xianzhou native. Jing Yuan reveals that the Disciples of Sanctus Medicus, a group that worships immortality, placed the Stellaron inside the tree. The Trailblazer fights the creatures and discover that Dan Shu, a blind healer, leads the group. At the Alchemy Commission, they stop the Disciples from using drugged smoke to force soldiers into becoming mara-struck. However, "Tingyun" then reveals herself to be Phantylia, a powerful servant of Nanook, the godlike Aeon of Destruction. Welt suggests that the real Tingyun may still be alive because the body disappeared rather than being left behind. At the same time, Dan Heng confronts Blade, who blames him for events connected to Dan Heng's previous life. After Blade wounds him, Dan Heng transforms into a powerful dragon-like form inherited from his former incarnation, Dan Feng. He reunites with the rest of the Astral Express crew and uses his powers to open a path beneath the sea to the roots of the Ambrosial Arbor. There, the group fights Phantylia and stops her from corrupting Jing Yuan, saving the Luofu from destruction. Afterward, the crew leaves, but later returns when ghost-like spirits called heliobi (sing. heliobus) escaped from a damaged prison. The Trailblazer and others hunt them down, and learn that although some heliobi are dangerous, they are not all evil.

The real Tingyun's consciousness drifted in darkness, unable to speak for a while. She eventually awakens in a laboratory run by Ruan Mei, a member of the Genius Society who is overseeing Tingyun's recovery. Ruan Mei tells Tingyun that her body bears scars from Phantylia's actions and that Tingyun must learn to change quickly; her tail has changed color as well. She gradually heals from her injuries. Eventually, Ruan Mei tells Tingyun the truth about what Phantylia did while disguised as her: causing calamity and poisoning the living with mara. Tingyun realizes that Phantylia not only stole her life, but her identity. Tingyun realizes that her fate was now tied to the Astral Express and decides to leave her old identity behind, concealing the news of her survival. The Xianzhou arc ends with a brief funeral-like ceremony for Tingyun, with its inhabitants unaware she is still alive.

== Release ==
The Xianzhou Luofu was released in version 1.0 of the game, which was released on April 23, 2023. Initially, only the areas of Central Starskiff Haven, Cloudford, Stargazer Navalia, Exalting Sanctum, and the Divination and Artisanship Commissions were released. The Alchemy Commission and Scalegorge Waterscape were released in version 1.2, which was released on July 19. Version 1.3 contained the August 30 release of Aurum Alley, and Fyxestroll Garden (along with the accompanying quest) was released in version 1.5 on November 15. The Shackling Prison was released in version 2.4 on July 30, 2024, and the Skysplitter area was released in version 2.5 on September 10.

== Reception ==
Critics' responses to the Xianzhou Luofu storyline were mixed. During the game's third closed beta, Game Teahouse praised the conclusion of the available storyline, describing Fu Xuan's arrival from the sky as a dramatic intervention that temporarily resolved the conflict and created anticipation comparable to the climax of a television series. Shi Chenlu of Jiefang Daily praised the broader representation of the setting, arguing that its combination of electronic and ethnic music, intangible cultural heritage techniques, and Chinese ink-painting aesthetics expanded international players' awareness of Chinese philosophy and successfully integrated traditional Chinese culture into a science-fiction narrative. Feiyun of GameRes similarly considered the Luofu's systematic use of Taoist mythology as distinctive from other games such as Tower of Fantasy, writing that greater reliance of imagery from the Classic of Mountains and Seas could have made the Xianzhou's setting less distinctive. Stephanie Liu of Siliconera criticized the Xianzhou's storyline for providing substantially less content than Liyue did in miHoYo's other game Genshin Impact, describing the climax as rushed and the epilogue as weak. Liu argued that developments such as Dan Heng's transformation and Tingyun's funeral lacked sufficient buildup, while major conflicts involving the Stellaron, the Ambrosial Arbor, the antagonistic Antimatter Legion, and other villainous factions remained unresolved, weakening the narrative tension. She further observed that Honkai: Star Rail's limited exploration and short updates left players with little additional content after completing daily activities and endgame modes.

Commentators generally highlighted the Xianzhou Luofu's combination of traditional Chinese culture and science fiction. Game Teahouse contrasted the setting with Shenzhou from Honkai Impact 3rd and Liyue, arguing that although all three represent Chinese-inspired fantasy worlds, they differ substantially in their underlying themes and cultural elements. The publication connected the Luofu's origins to the legend of Qin Shihuangdi sending Xu Fu in search of immortality, stating that its themes of wandering and exploring the unknown parallel the Astral Express crew's journey across the universe. It also identified the coexistence of humans with dragon- and fox-like races as an adaptation of creatures found in ancient Chinese legends, regarding the integration of such cultural themes as one of the game's literary strengths. Xuan Jing of Wenhui Daily similarly stated that the collision between a science-fiction worldview and traditional Chinese culture created a distinctive atmosphere. Peng Xinyi characterized the setting's aesthetic as silkpunk, arguing that it balances ancient Chinese imagery with futuristic technology. Peng further observed that symmetrical layouts in some locations convey authority and discipline. Ginkgo trees symbolize the Xianzhou inhabitant's longevity, whereas holographic plum bonsais combine traditional associations with virtue and good luck with advanced technology.

Feiyun of GameRes described the Luofu as a convincing fusion of Chinese mythology and science fiction, and considered it a representative example of this approach. They argued that the setting finds common ground between folklore and science fiction through themes like immortality, reincarnation, and the changing perspectives of long-lived beings. Rather than relying heavily on hard-science concepts, the Xianzhou Luofu uses long lifespans and the resulting conflicts between long- and short-lived species to construct its world and stories. Feiyun also praised the game's accessible and easy-to-understand terminology, noting that terms such as "Divination Commission" are explained organically and that the setting avoids using excessively obscure cultural references or complicated science-fiction jargon. Its portrayal of everyday life was similarly credited with creating an environment that felt simultaneously ancient and futuristic.
