= Kafka (Honkai: Star Rail) =

Video game character

- Honkai character
- Official artwork
- First game: Honkai: Star Rail (2023)
- Voiced by: EN: Cheryl Texiera; ZH: Xu Hui; JA: Shizuka Itō; KO: Sa Moon-young

In-universe information
- Home: Pteruges-V
- Type: Lightning
- Paths: Nihility (combat), Finality (lore)

Kafka (Chinese: 卡芙卡; pinyin: Kǎfúkǎ) is a character in the video game Honkai: Star Rail, developed by miHoYo. She is a member of the in-game fictional organization known as the Stellaron Hunters. She was first seen in version 1.0 of the game in April 2023 and was released as a playable character in version 1.2.

Kafka is the first character players play as in the game. She is second-in-command of the Stellaron Hunters, a group of wanted intergalactic criminals that plays a major role in the game's plot. She works to achieve a future envisioned by Elio, her superior, who uses "scripts" to guide people. She has been positively received by players and critics for her highly attractive design, which was generally seen as sexy.

== Design and voice acting ==
In the game, Kafka is a member of the Stellaron Hunters, a faction that walks the Path of Finality, and one of the most trusted followers of Elio, the organization's leader. She possesses powerful mental manipulation abilities and is skilled at mind control. In terms of character design, she resembles an earlier version of Kafka that first appeared in Guns Girl Z. Her name is derived from the 20th-century novelist Franz Kafka.

Kafka is voiced in Chinese by Xu Hui, in English by Cheryl Texiera, in Japanese by Shizuka Itō, and in Korean by Sa Moon-young.

== Appearances ==
Kafka comes from a planet called Pteruges-V, a planet heavily affected by a Stellaron. Stellarons are mysterious entities spread across the universe that are considered "seeds of disaster" and can cause massive changes to civilizations. On Pteruges-V, people cannot feel fear and are driven instead by pleasure and desire, eventually turning into what Kafka calls "devils." The game does not specify if she means this figuratively or literally. Kafka once worked as a Devil Hunter, but she was dissatisfied with the status quo there and sought change. After encountering Elio on Pteruges-V, she accepted his invitation to join the Stellaron Hunters. Kafka is one of the group's first members, other than Elio himself. Following Elio's instructions, she recruited others, such as Firefly, to join the Stellaron Hunters as well.

Kafka possesses a powerful mind control ability known as Spirit Whisper. When activating this power, she uses the words "Listen to me." In the Trailblaze Mission "Today Is Yesterday's Tomorrow", which takes place at the beginning of the game, she and fellow Stellaron Hunter Silver Wolf infiltrate a space station, steal a Stellaron, and implant it into a vessel (the game's protagonist, the Trailblazer) before leaving. In the lore, the vessel's name and gender are also chosen by Kafka, but in reality, these are chosen by the player. Before Kafka implants the Stellaron inside the Trailblazer, players play as Kafka.

Later, Kafka contacts the Astral Express crew (the Trailblazer and their friends) and tells them that there is a Stellaron crisis unfolding on the starship called the Xianzhou Luofu, asking them to investigate it for her. It is revealed that one of Kafka's accomplices, Blade, is currently aboard the Luofu and is a fugitive from justice there. Kafka is also deemed a threat, and an arrest warrant is issued for her. A search party is formed for Kafka, and eventually it is revealed that she intentionally placed clues on the Luofu to lead the Trailblazer to herself, after which she fights the Trailblazer and allies, and loses. During the fight, she tells them that she believes the Stellaron Hunters are merely slaves to destiny. Fu Xuan arrives to take her prisoner and interrogates her. Fu Xuan clarifies that Kafka has nothing to do with the Stellaron crisis, and leaves the Trailblazer alone with her. Kafka tells the Trailblazer that, among other things, the Stellaron Hunters' sole purpose in arriving on the Luofu was to lure the Astral Express there so that the Trailblazer could help them, and that eventually the Trailblazer would fight the Aeon of Destruction, Nanook, and that they would need all the help they could get. She frees herself from Fu Xuan's shackles, and is aided in her escape by Blade. In Kafka's Companion Mission, she plays a "truth game" with the Trailblazer and reveals several previously-unknown truths about both herself and the Trailblazer, including that the latter is an artificial being created to contain a Stellaron.

=== Gameplay ===
Kafka is a 5-star Lightning character who follows the Path of Nihility. (Note: In the game, Paths define both a character's philosophies and how they fight in combat. Characters on the Path of Nihility don't believe in interacting with others much, and are generally known for putting debuffs on enemies in combat.) Her skill set is built around damage over time (DoT) and follow-up attacks. Kafka's Basic Attack deals Lightning damage to a single targeted enemy. Her Skill deals Lightning damage to a selected enemy and adjacent targets, while also triggering an additional instance of damage based on existing DoT effects on those enemies. Her ultimate deals Lightning damage to all enemies and has a high chance of inflicting a status of Shock, causing additional damage over time. Kafka's Talent allows her to launch a follow-up attack whenever one of her teammates performs a Basic Attack against an enemy. This follow-up attack deals Lightning damage to that target and has a high chance to apply Shock. In version 3.4 of the game, Kafka received additional buffs that allowed her to grant an ATK increase to her allies. Additionally, her Skill, follow-up attacks, and ultimate can all immediately trigger existing DoT effects, further increasing her synergy with certain teams.

== Promotion and release ==
Kafka made her debut as a playable character in version 1.0, when she was released only temporarily during the game's first quest. After the release of version 1.2 of the game, players were able to obtain Kafka permanently as a playable character via the game's gacha system. Before version 1.2 was released, miHoYo had already begun promoting Kafka as a character. On May 24, 2023, the company released Kafka's official character artwork and trailer. On August 8, a character trailer for Kafka called "Dramatic Irony" was released, showcasing her combat animations and abilities. On August 13, another trailer called "Jepella Rebellion: Scene 47" was published, expanding on Kafka and her background. On October 9, 2026, it was revealed that Kafka and Robin would be added as playable crossover characters in another miHoYo game, Zenless Zone Zero.

In August 2023, the Taiwanese beverage chain COMEBUY collaborated with Honkai: Star Rail to release three character-themed drinks: one each for Kafka, Silver Wolf, and their fellow Stellaron Hunter, Blade. The drinks were sold with bonus merchandise featuring Kafka's character, including in-game item cards, exclusive character stickers, and themed coasters. On the first day of the event, COMEBUY stores were surrounded by fans, with lines continuing for twelve hours straight. miHoYo also partnered with the Japanese eyewear brand Zoff to release a line of collaboration glasses featuring characters including Kafka, Dan Heng • Imbibitor Lunae, and Aventurine. Kafka was also featured in a promotion campaign in the Philippines for what Angela Coloma of ABS-CBN News describes as a "famous bubble tea brand". In 2024, miHoYo released a miniature figure of her playing the violin the same way she does in her in-game animations. Good Smile Company announced in October 30, 2025, that they would release nendoroid plastic figures of Kafka starting in May 2026. In 2026, miHoYo partnered with Epic Games to release Kafka and Blade avatars for use in Fortnite. The skins were released on February 26 and sold in bundles.

== Reception ==
Kafka was received warmly by players, who generally have a favorable impression of her character design and personality. Some players have also expressed their love for Kafka via cosplay. Angela Coloma of ABS-CBN News described her as a "fan favorite" and called her appearance cunning, writing that her character trailer had 1.8 million views as of August 2023. Ken Allsop of PCGamesN agreed, calling her "everyone's fave". Lin Zhuoheng of HK01 described her as "probably the most popular and attention-grabbing character" in the game, and attributed this to the combination of her prominent role in the game's story but also her character design. "[W]ho can resist a mature and sexy older sister with a heavy sense of mystery?" they added. Even before the game launched, Kafka had already become one of the most popular characters among players, according to Marco Wutz of Sports Illustrated. Willa Rowe of Inverse characterized her as stylish and charming, arguing that she presents a new threat to the protagonists, and said she particularly remembered the moment when she convinced the Astral Express to switch destinations to deal with a Stellaron that was causing problems. She also theorized about the relationship between Kafka and the Astral Express navigator, Himeko. Writing for Kotaku, Rowe also described her as "morally grey".

Critics and players also highlighted specific moments and traits that contributed to Kafka's popularity. Memorable moments include scenes such as her playing an invisible violin on the space station, her combat animations which have been described as stylish, and the moment where she takes advantage of chaos to implant the Stellaron into the Trailblazer's body. Because of her demeanor and presence, she has been referred to affectionately as "mommy". Jess Reyes of Inverse went further and called her a "dommy mommy", attributing this to her "breathy laugh and trickster charm" and compared Kafka's violin animations to Johann Pachelbel's canon. Jisumarokku of Denfaminico Gamer wrote that Kafka's fighting style and outfit gave her a "sexy coolness". He appreciated what he called the "temporarily playing as an enemy character" aspect of the first part of the game's story. He also praised the fact that she could "wield katanas and fire two submachine guns at once", hypothesizing that her sword would be massively popular with children if it was sold at souvenir shops. Jisumarokku described her as "HoYoverse's version of Makima", referencing the main antagonist of Chainsaw Man, to which the Kotaku staff concurred. However, he also called her use of dual submachine guns in her ultimate "a bit excessive". Kafka was added into the game as a minor boss character that can throw bombs at the protagonists; Jisumarokku said that this move was "ridiculously high-effort" and that she was "way too favored" by the developers.
