= Hex Maniac =

Pokémon trainer type

- Pokémon character
- Hex Maniac in Pokémon X and Y
- First game: Pokémon Ruby and Sapphire (2002)
- Voiced by: Saori Ōnishi (Pokémon Masters EX)

The Hex Maniac, known in Japan as Occult Maniac (Japanese: オカルトマニア, Hepburn: Okaruto Mania), is a fictional character introduced in the 2002 video games Pokémon Ruby and Sapphire. In Pokémon X and Y, the Hex Maniac received a redesign. In these same games, a specific Hex Maniac appears as a ghost girl who, when encountered by the player, states "no, you are not the one" and disappears. A new design was added in Pokémon Legends Z-A, prompting speculation about whether this game would explore the ghost girl's story; it did not.

The Hex Maniac has been generally well received, identified by Inside Games as rivaling the popularity of main characters in the series. The ghost girl was particularly discussed by critics, who felt the encounter mysterious and frightening.

== Concept and creation ==
Developed by Game Freak and published by Nintendo, the Pokémon franchise began in Japan in 1996 with the release of the video games Pokémon Red and Blue for the Game Boy. In these games, the player assumes the role of a Pokémon Trainer whose goal is to capture and train creatures called Pokémon. Players use the creatures' special abilities to combat other Pokémon, both in the wild as well as those used by other Trainers.

Hex Maniacs debuted in Pokémon Ruby and Sapphire, and received a redesign in Pokémon X and Y. The design has a "spooky, gaunt vibe" that makes her seem possessed. The Hex Maniac wears a black outfit in Pokémon X and Y. In Pokémon Legends Z-A, the Hex Maniac gained a new design. It gives her dark circles under her eyes, messy hair, and an all-black outfit, described as "gothic-lolita-esque".

== Appearances ==
First appearing in Pokémon Ruby and Sapphire as a Pokémon Trainer class, the Hex Maniac appears again in Pokémon X and Y. They also appear in Pokémon Legends Z-A. In X and Y, a ghost girl that resembles Hex Maniac appears out of an elevator in Lumiose City, stating "No, you're not the one" to the player-character, and leaving. This ghost girl appears in the Ruby and Sapphire remakes Pokémon Omega Ruby and Alpha Sapphire. References to her appearance in X and Y exist in Legends Z-A as well, with one character expressing a wish to know what this means and another character stating that a ghost girl has been haunting taxis in the city saying "No, you're not the one either".

A card depicting Hex Maniac appears in the Pokémon Trading Card Game. This card, alongside another card called Ghetsis, was banned from competitive play due to both being "oppressive" and causing opponents to sometimes lose before they had a single turn. She also appears in Pokémon Masters EX as a playable character, named Helena in English and Sayoko in Japanese, as part of a Halloween-themed event. She is accompanied by a Haunter.

== Reception ==
Hex Maniac's X and Y design has been generally well received, described by Inside Games writer Sushishi as "incredibly popular". Inside Games writer "Tea Pudding" attributed this popularity to their design and dialogue, which they felt added personality to the game's world. They stated that the X and Y design was a particularly popular one, believing that the trainer class had a reputation rivaling main characters in the series.

Starting with X and Y, the ghost had become a mystery to players and the subject of speculation. Multiple critics considered it a particularly creepy moment; both Game Revolution and Hardcore Gamer ranked it among the most frightening Easter eggs in video games. Multiple fan theories exist, including that she was looking for another character that appears in the series, that she was the intended method to obtain certain unreleased Pokémon species, that she was related to a ghost girl from Pokémon Black and White, and that a message found in the game, referring to a "usual location", is referring to the elevator. None of these theories materialized. Patricia Hernandez, writing for Kotaku, sought to learn more about the ghost girl by showing video of her to Junichi Masuda, the producer of X and Y, who responded by saying "oOoOoOoO" multiple times while smirking and offering no clarification. She believed he may have been teasing her and had nothing to do with its inclusion, but determined that was unlikely due to her appearance on a page on the Japanese official site that was all about her. Hernandez also believed that the website may have been teasing a Halloween-themed event, and hoped that players would learn more about her in time. Hernandez also noted the Hex Maniac in Omega Ruby and Alpha Sapphire, speculating over whether these are the same characters and whether they are looking for the same person.

Dexerto writer Scott Baird speculated that the unresolved nature of the ghost girl story is due to the existence of a cancelled followup called Pokémon Z, which he believed may have expanded on it. In another article, Baird compared the ghost girl favorably to a ghost character in Pokémon Sword and Shield, stating that the former was so effective because players were never given an explanation for her motives or nature. GamesRadar+ writer Paul Cecchini also considered her lack of explanation a positive trait, stating that it made her uniquely creepy. He speculated that the ghost girl may have no backstory at all and was only added to be funny and make players invested in her. Hex Maniac's Z-A appearance received a large amount of fanart, and it was speculated that this appearance may continue the ghost girl plot from X and Y. Kotaku writer Kenneth Shepard, reacting to a trailer for the Pokémon Mega Victreebel, believed it may be hinting towards the return of the ghost girl, stating there seems to be a "girl dressed in a dark purple outfit hiding outside a window" resembling the new Hex Maniac design.
