= Siming =

Siming may refer to:

- Siming District, an urban district of Xiamen, Fujian, China
- Siming (deity), a deity or title thereof of the Director of Fate or Master of Destiny
