= Yūki Takada =

Japanese voice actress

- 高田 憂希
- Born: March 16, 1993 (age 33); Kitakyushu, Fukuoka Prefecture, Japan
- Occupation: Voice actress
- Years active: 2013–present
- Agent: Mausu Promotion
- Height: 151 cm (4 ft 11 in)

Signature
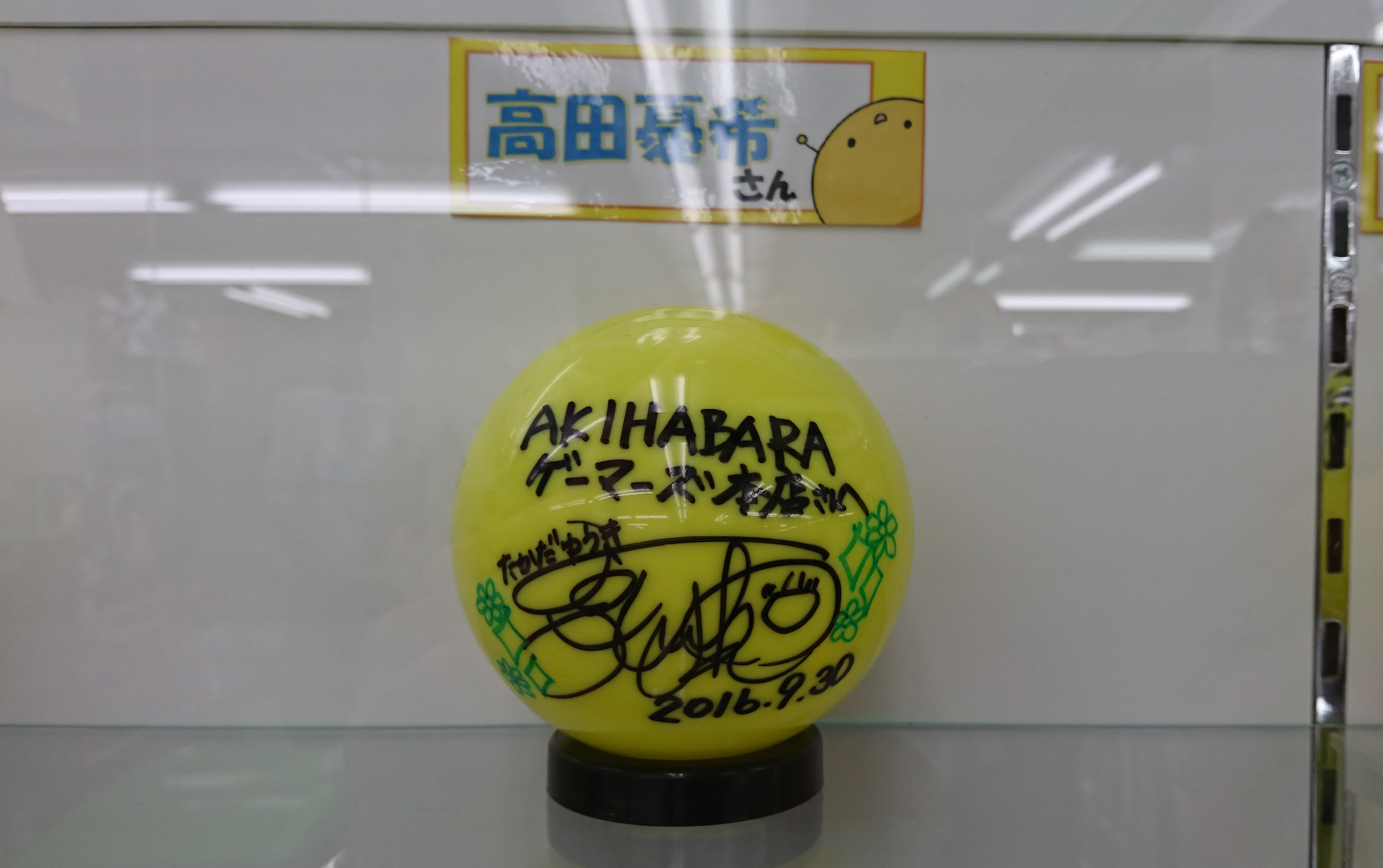

Yūki Takada (高田 憂希, Takada Yūki; born March 16, 1993) is a Japanese voice actress from Kitakyushu, Fukuoka Prefecture. She is affiliated with Mausu Promotion.

After graduating from the Yoyogi Animation School in Fukuoka, she joined Mausu Promotion in 2015. She is best known for her roles as Rin Kurosawa in Aikatsu! and Aoba Suzukaze in the 2016 anime television series New Game!. In New Game!, she performed the opening and ending theme songs alongside Megumi Yamaguchi, Ayumi Takeo, and Megumi Toda under the unit name Fourfolium.

== Filmography ==
=== Anime ===
2014

- Blade & Soul
- Fate/stay night: Unlimited Blade Works as students
- Shōnen Hollywood as Girl

2015

- Aikatsu! as Rin Kurosawa
- Osomatsu-san as a female student

2016

- New Game! as Aoba Suzukaze

2017

- Armed Girl's Machiavellism as Rin Onigawara
- Miss Kobayashi's Dragon Maid as Elma (eps. 8 - 13)
- New Game!! as Aoba Suzukaze

2018

- A Certain Magical Index III as Lessar
- Aikatsu Friends! as Momone Yūki
- Bloom Into You as Yuu Koito
- Mitsuboshi Colors as Yui Akamatsu
- Ulysses: Jeanne d'Arc and the Alchemist Knight as Philip

2020

- By the Grace of the Gods as Mizelia
- Infinite Dendrogram as Babylon
- Kaguya-sama: Love is War? as Rei Onodera
- King's Raid: Successors of the Will as Reina
- Maesetsu! as Manatsu Kogarashi
- DanMachi III as Ray
- Super HxEros as Yona Ichōgi

2021

- Miss Kobayashi's Dragon Maid S as Elma
- The World's Finest Assassin Gets Reincarnated in Another World as an Aristocrat as Tarte
- Mushoku Tensei: Jobless Reincarnation as Aisha Greyrat

2022

- Girls' Frontline as Destroyer (eps. 8–10)
- Kaguya-sama: Love Is War -Ultra Romantic- as Rei Onodera
- In the Heart of Kunoichi Tsubaki as Suzushiro
- Shinobi no Ittoki as Shione Kо̄zuki

2023

- Bullbuster as Miyuki Shirogane
- Malevolent Spirits: Mononogatari as Botan Nagatsuki

2024

- Sengoku Youko as Tama
- A Salad Bowl of Eccentrics as Yuna Naganawa

2026

- Even a Replica Can Fall in Love as Ritsuko Hironaka
- Killed Again, Mr. Detective? as Fido, Belka

=== Original video animation (OVA) ===
- Armed Girl's Machiavellism (2017) as Rin Onigawara
- Thus Spoke Kishibe Rohan (2018) as Naoko's Daughter (ep. 2)
- Onna no Sono no Hoshi (2022) as Yuka Kurata

=== Films ===
- Bayonetta: Bloody Fate (2013)
- HappinessCharge PreCure! Ningyō no Kuni no Ballerina (2014)
- Miss Kobayashi's Dragon Maid: A Lonely Dragon Wants to Be Loved (2025) as Elma

=== Video games ===
- Shironeko Project as Mikan Karatachi
- Tokyo 7th Sisters as Musubi Tendōji
- Aikatsu! My No.1 Stage as Rin Kurosawa
- Nights of Azure
- Girls' Frontline as SR-3MP
- The Idolmaster Cinderella Girls as Yoshino Yorita
- New Game!: The Challenge Stage as Aoba Suzukaze
- Blue Reflection as Hinako Shirai
- Alice Gear Aegis as Eri Yorishiro
- King's Raid as Reina
- Food Fantasy as Jiuniang and Strawberry Daifuku
- Onsen Musume as Yuina Kusatsu
- Atelier Online as Sorrel
- A Certain Magical Virtual-On as Lessar
- Code Vein as Rin Murasame
- Azur Lane as KMS Z18, HMS Icarus
- Fire Emblem Heroes as Tharja, Rhajat, Cherche
- Blue Archive as Saiba Midori
- The Caligula Effect 2 as Kranke
- Blue Reflection: Second Light as Hinako Shirai
- Alchemy Stars as Elma
- The Future You've Been Dreaming Of as Sachi Usui
- Honkai: Star Rail as Tingyun and Fugue
- Sentimental Death Loop as Nemu Tsukishiro
- Arknights as U-Official
- Umamusume: Pretty Derby as Shinko Windy
- Project SEKAI: COLORFUL STAGE! as Arisa Higure
- Stella Sora as Amber

=== Others ===
- Ane no Shinyuu, Watashi no Koibito as Sena (promotional video)
