= List of Honkai: Star Rail characters =

Characters of 2023 role-playing video game

Honkai: Star Rail is a 2023 role-playing video game developed and published by miHoYo. The game contains a rich character roster set in a science fantasy universe. The story follows the Trailblazer and their allies as they travel through space on the interstellar train known as the Astral Express. The universe is highly influenced by ideologies, referred to as Paths, which are embodied by god-like beings known as Aeons. Those who have been given power by Aeons are known as Emanators, while those who just follow Paths are known as Pathstriders. Throughout the story, the Trailblazer and their allies get involved with various worlds' issues as they try to deal with the crises caused by mysterious entities known as Stellarons. Star Rail is the fourth entry in the Honkai series of video games. Some characters from previous titles like Bronya and Himeko are reimagined into alternate versions of themselves.

Honkai: Star Rail's characters have been very well-received by critics. The game's cast have been praised for having unique personalities, animations, and aesthetics. Reviewers noted how the characters all have a strong sense of individuality and are very likeable.

== Creation and design ==
In an interview, Honkai: Star Rail producer David Jiang said the developers place a lot of value on creating characters. It can take around one month to write a story for just one character. The developers also put a lot of effort into the characters so that the developers themselves feel as though they are part of the game world. Jiang added that the developers aren't trying to control what the characters do. Instead they are trying to capture what the characters are saying, doing, and experiencing, as if they were real people. They often base characters' traits on real people they have met.

According to lead game designer Chengnan An, the developers use a "character-first" approach which prioritizes the characters' personalities and story over game mechanics. He explained that the developers will have less creative freedom when designing game mechanics before characters, stating, "we ran out of inspo really, really fast". The characters go through several iterations to make them "prettier and even more handsome and even more cool with each iteration". The developers also like to give the characters unique characteristics to help them stand out. For example, Dr. Ratio uses a large book to attack, which shows off how egotistical he is, while Himeko is shown calmly enjoying her tea in her ultimate animation.

In relation to the design of character AI, Jiang stated that AI has been used to create more immersive gameplay by reducing the stiffness of NPC behavior. The aim is to give players an "alive" feeling when playing the game. He also went on to say that at present, AI is used mainly as a development aid, but in the future it could be used to expand the characters’ dialogue and interactions.

In terms of character backstories, Jiang stated that they have been carefully crafted in order to provide a meaningful narrative within the game. The developers have taken inspiration from road movies where the protagonist and their group travel throughout different worlds with varying social, technological, and cultural settings. This helps to showcase the development of relationships between characters, as well as their personal growth throughout the different environments.

Before a new character arrives in the game they are promoted through miHoYo's official social media accounts via promotional videos. Once a character is added to the game, more depth is given to them through main story content, side quests, and extra game content. The Companion Missions add depth to each character's background and traits that may have not been covered within the main story.

In terms of gameplay, the developers have mentioned that the gameplay mechanics are deeply connected to character design. The game features a system called "Paths" which functions both as ideologies and gameplay roles. In terms of lore, a character's Path represents the philosophical path they take in line with their Aeon. In terms of gameplay, they define what role a character plays in combat, such as damage dealer, support, or healer. At the game's launch, playable characters were categorized into seven Paths, with additional Paths introduced in later updates. In addition to Paths, playable characters are also categorized into seven damage types.

== Astral Express crew ==
The Astral Express crew are the main characters of the game and the current inhabitants of the Astral Express (Chinese: 星穹列车; pinyin: Xīngqióng Lièchē; lit. 'Starry Sky Train'). They follow the Path of Trailblaze.

=== Trailblazer ===
Voiced by: Qin Qiege (Chinese); Caleb Yen (2023–2025), Shaun Mendum (2025–present) (English); Junya Enoki (Japanese); Kim Myung-jun (Korean) (Caelus)
Voiced by: Chen Tingting (Chinese); Rachael Chau (2023–2025), Chloe Eves (2025–present) (English); Yui Ishikawa (Japanese); Kim Ha-ru (Korean) (Stelle)

The Trailblazer (开拓者; Kāituòzhě) is the main protagonist of the game. An artificial receptacle, in the form of a human being, that contains a Stellaron. Players can choose to play as either the male (Caelus, 穹; Qióng) or female (Stelle, 星; Xīng) Trailblazer and may enter their chosen name to be used throughout the story. After being awakened by Kafka and Silver Wolf in Herta Space Station, they joined the Astral Express to eliminate the threats posed by the Stellaron. It is revealed that they were previously part of the Stellaron Hunters prior to the start of the game.

=== Dan Heng ===
Voiced by: Li Chunyin (Chinese); Nicholas Leung (English); Kent Itō (Japanese); Kim Hye-sung (Korean)

Dan Heng (丹恒; Dān Héng) is a reserved young man who acts as the train's guard. He often spends more time in the Astral Express data archives than in his bedroom. He conceals his true identity as a Vidyadhara, a dragon-like species, from the inhabitants of the Xianzhou Luofu. In a previous incarnation, he was known as Imbibitor Lunae (饮月; Yǐn Yuè), the title of the Luofu's high-ranking Vidyadhara leader. Though he has since inherited that incarnation's powers, he has never formally held the title himself because it is reserved for another Vidyadhara, Bailu. During the Xianzhou Luofu chapter, his past is revealed when the Astral Express crew is drawn into a conflict involving the Xianzhou Alliance's armed forces, known as the Cloud Knights. He later reawakens his powers while remaining loyal to the Astral Express.

=== March 7th ===
Voiced by: Nuoya (Chinese); Skyler Davenport (English); Yui Ogura (Japanese); Jung Hye-won (Korean)

March 7th (三月七; Sānyuè Qī) is a cheerful girl with no memory of her past before the Astral Express crew rescued her from being encased in ice. She took the name "March 7th" as it marked the date of her rescue. During the events of Amphoreus, a protective alter ego known as Evernight (长夜月; Chángyèyuè) emerged, seizing control of March and becoming the demigod of Time.

=== Murata Himeko ===
Voiced by: Lin Su (Chinese); Cia Court (English); Rie Tanaka (Japanese); Kim Bo-na (Korean)

Murata Himeko (无量塔姬子; Wúliàngtǎ Jīzǐ) is a scientist who fixed the Astral Express when it became stuck in her home world of Planarcadia as a teenager. She later becomes the train's navigator and de facto owner and is the most senior active member of the Nameless, a group that travels aboard the Astral Express to follow the Path of Trailblaze. During the Planarcadia chapter, it is revealed that Himeko, in her childhood, was stricken with a hereditary curse that would kill her. The curse was instead inherited by an imagenae she created, a sentient creature native to Planarcadia brought into existence through wishes. The imagenae called Motoko (素子; Sùzǐ) eventually faded away, curing Himeko and allowing her to live on.

=== Pom-Pom ===
Voiced by: Jiang Li (Chinese); Christine Sposato (English); Miki Nagasawa (Japanese); Yoon A-yeong (Korean)

Pom-Pom (帕姆; Pàmǔ) is the conductor of the Astral Express.

=== Sunday ===
Voiced by: Xu Xiang (Chinese); Griffin Puatu, Amber Lee Connors (young) (English); Takeo Ōtsuka (Japanese); Kang Seong-woo (Korean)

Sunday is a zealous and revered Halovian, a humanoid species with angelic features. He is the former head of the Oak Family, a political house, as well as Robin's brother. He was secretly a Pathstrider of Order and the main antagonist of the Penacony chapter. In order to seek atonement for his actions in the aftermath of the Stellaron incident, he left Penacony to join the Astral Express as a passenger. During the Astropolis chapter, he becomes an official crew member after being invited by Himeko, an offer he accepts.

=== Welt Yang ===
Voiced by: Peng Bo (Chinese); Corey Landis (2023–2026), Brian T. Delaney (2026–present) (English); Yoshimasa Hosoya (Japanese); Han-sin (Korean)

Welt Yang (瓦尔特·杨; Wǎ'ěrtè Yáng), whose real name is Joachim Nokianvirtanen (约阿希姆·诺基安维塔宁; Yuē'āxīmǔ Nuòjī'ānwéitǎníng), is the second-most senior active member of the Nameless and the former leader of the anti-cataclysmic organization Anti-Entropy. The events that occur in the aftermath of Honkai Impact 3rd's open world mode A Post-Honkai Odyssey Chapter 2 and its supplementary manhua Alien Space eventually led to his appearance in the game.

== Characters by world ==
=== Herta Space Station ===
Herta Space Station (空间站「黑塔」; Kōngjiān Zhàn "Hēitǎ") is named after its founder, Herta, and orbits her home world, the Blue. Originally built as a warehouse to store a collection of interstellar relics known as Curios, it was later inhabited by researchers from numerous planets across the cosmos and has since become a scientific research base.

Arlan (阿兰; Ālán)
Voiced by: Tao Dian (Chinese); Dani Chambers (English); Ryoko Shiraishi (Japanese); Kim Yul (Korean)
Arlan is the head of the space station's security department.
Asta (艾丝妲; Àisīdá)
Voiced by: Guiniang (Chinese); Felecia Angelle (English); Chinatsu Akasaki (Japanese); Kim Hyeon-ji (Korean)
Asta is an astronomer and the space station's lead researcher who comes from a wealthy family from the resort planet Astropolis. Arlan often has to rein in her spending.
Herta (黑塔; Hēitǎ)

Voiced by: Hou Xiaofei (Chinese); PJ Mattson (English); Haruka Yamazaki (Japanese); Kim Seo-yeong (Korean)
The space station's true master and the interest-driven member #83 of the Genius Society. Herta is an Emanator of Erudition who controls her namesake puppets, loosely modelled after her younger self, scattered throughout the space station. To distinguish herself between the puppets, she refers to herself as The Herta (大黑塔; Dà Hēitǎ).
Ruan Mei (阮·梅; Ruǎn Méi)

Voiced by: Zhang Wenyu (Chinese); Emi Lo (English); Saori Ōnishi (Japanese); Yoon Yeo-jin (Korean)
Ruan Mei is a biological sciences expert and member #81 of the Genius Society. She is a completely amoral scientist with dreams of becoming an Aeon herself, though she regrets being unable to emotionally connect with her creations.

=== Jarilo-VI ===
Jarilo-VI (雅利洛-Ⅵ; Yǎlìluò-VI) is an ice planet. It is uninhabitable outside the city of Belobog due to a winter storm, called the Eternal Freeze, that was caused by a Stellaron. Belobog is governed by the Silvermane Guards, who are followers of the Path of Preservation.

Bronya Rand (布洛妮娅·兰德; Bùluònīyà Lándé)

Voiced by: Xie Ying (Chinese); Madeline Reiter (English); Kana Asumi (Japanese); Lee Bo-hee (Korean)
The commander of the Silvermane Guards and Cocolia's adoptive daughter. Bronya became the ruler of Belobog after Cocolia's death.
Clara (克拉拉; Kèlālā)
Voiced by: Zisu Jiuyue (Chinese); Emily Sun (English); Rina Hidaka (Japanese); Kim Yea-lim (Korean) (Clara)
Voiced by: Wang Yuhang (Chinese); D. C. Douglas (English); Hiroki Yasumoto (Japanese); Choi Nak-yoon (Korean) (Svarog)
Clara is a mild-mannered young girl and a self-taught mechanic. She is often accompanied by the robot Svarog (史瓦罗; Shǐwǎluó).
Gepard Landau (杰帕德·朗道; Jiépàdé Lǎngdào)
Voiced by: Ma Yang (Chinese); Bryson Baugus (English); Makoto Furukawa (Japanese); Min Seung-woo (Korean)
The dutiful captain of the Silvermane Guards, who is Serval's and Lynx's brother. Gepard is the middle sibling of the Landau family.
Hook (虎克; Hǔkè)
Voiced by: Wang Xiaotong (Chinese); Felecia Angelle (English); Sora Tokui (Japanese); Lee Jae-hyun (Korean)
Hook is the self-proclaimed boss of the Moles, a group of children who go on adventures and play pranks throughout the underground region of Belobog, known as the Underworld.
Luka (卢卡; Lúkǎ)
Voiced by: Xiao Zhai (Chinese); Howard Wang (English); Gakuto Kajiwara (Japanese); Lee Joo-seung (Korean)
Luka is a fighter and a member of Wildfire, a grassroots organization based in the Underworld. He tries to support his friends and neighbors, even at his own expense.
Lynx Landau (玲可·朗道; Língkě Lǎngdào)
Voiced by: Mihu (Chinese); Risa Mei (English); Haruka Terui (Japanese); Lee Eun-jo (Korean)
Lynx is a polar explorer who is Serval's and Gepard's sister. She is the youngest sibling of the Landau family, as well as a friend of Pela. She is also the keyboardist of the musical band Mechanical Fever.
Natasha (娜塔莎; Nàtǎshā)
Voiced by: Qin Ziyi (Chinese); Elizabeth Maxwell (English); Yumi Uchiyama (Japanese); Gang Eun-ae (Korean)
Natasha is a doctor and the true leader of Wildfire.
Pelageya "Pela" Sergeyevna (佩拉格娅·谢尔盖耶夫娜; Pèilāgéyà Xiè'ěrgàiyēfūnà)
Voiced by: Yanning (Chinese); Xanthe Huynh (English); Sumire Morohoshi (Japanese); Lee Da-eun (Korean)
The intelligence officer of the Silvermane Guards. Pela is a friend of Lynx and the drummer of Mechanical Fever.
Seele (希儿; Xī'ér)
Voiced by: Tang Yajing (Chinese); Molly Zhang (English); Mai Nakahara (Japanese); Song Ha-rim (Korean)
Seele is a spirited member of Wildfire. She grew up at the same orphanage as Bronya.
Serval Landau (希露瓦·朗道; Xīlùwǎ Lǎngdào)
Voiced by: Mu Xueting (Chinese); Natalie Van Sistine (English); Aimi (Japanese); Min-a (Korean)
Serval is a brilliant mechanic who is Gepard's and Lynx's sister. She is the eldest sibling of the Landau family and her affection for rock n' roll is evident in her role as the lead vocalist and guitarist of Mechanical Fever.

=== Xianzhou Alliance ===
The Xianzhou Alliance (仙舟联盟; Xiānzhōu Liánméng) is an ancient, spacefaring civilization that is currently composed of six Xianzhou ships: the Fanghu, the Luofu, the Xuling, the Yaoqing, the Yuque, and the Zhuming. Before the game's events, the fleet (known as the Hexafleet in the game) was composed of nine ships, with the Cangcheng, Daiyu, and Yuanqiao having been destroyed. The Xianzhou Alliance follows the Path of the Hunt.

Bailu (白露; Báilù)
Voiced by: Duoduo (Chinese); Su Ling Chan (English); Emiri Katō (Japanese); Cho Hyun-jung (Korean)
Bailu is a Vidyadhara doctor of the Alchemy Commission on the Luofu. She often tries to escape her responsibilities. She is the heir apparent to the Imbibitor Lunae.
Feixiao (飞霄; Fēixiāo)
Voiced by: Ye Zhiqiu (Chinese); Anairis Quiñones (English); Mikako Komatsu (Japanese); Son Jung-min (Korean)
Feixiao, whose real name is Saran (萨兰; Sàlán), is one of the seven Arbiter-Generals, the top officers of the Cloud Knights. She serves as the general of the Yaoqing. She is a foxian, a humanoid species with fox-like features, but has some canine-like features from her borisin ancestry. This ancestry also afflicts her with Moon Rage, a condition akin to lycanthropy.
Fu Xuan (符玄; Fú Xuán)
Voiced by: Hualing (Chinese); Sarah Wiedenheft (English); Miku Itō (Japanese); Lee Ji-hyeon (Korean)
The head of the Divination Commission on the Luofu. Fu Xuan is the prospective successor for Jing Yuan as Arbiter-General for the Luofu.
Guinaifen (桂乃芬; Guìnǎifēn)
Voiced by: Xiao Gan (Chinese); Morgan Lauré (English); Hina Suguta (Japanese); Kim Su-yeong (Korean)
Guinaifen is a street performer who resides on the Luofu after the Antimatter Legion destroyed her home planet. Her real name is Guinevere (格妮薇儿; Génīwēi'er), which is localized as Guinaifen by her friend Sushang.
Hanya (寒鸦; Hányā)
Voiced by: Zhang Yuxi (Chinese); Suzie Yeung (English); Sayumi Suzushiro (Japanese); Yoon Eun-seo (Korean)
Hanya is a judge of the Ten-Lords Commission on the Luofu who has become numb after becoming flooded with work and haunted by nightmares. She is Xueyi's younger sister.
Huaiyan (怀炎; Huáiyán)
Voiced by: Li Haojia (Chinese); J. Michael Tatum (English); Tadashi Miyazawa (Japanese); Jo Min-soo (Korean)
Huaiyan is one of the seven Arbiter-Generals and the general of the Zhuming. He is Yunli's adoptive grandfather.
Huohuo (藿藿; Huòhuò)
Voiced by: Ge Zirui (Chinese); Courtney Lin (2023–2024), Megan Shipman (2024–present) (English); Maria Naganawa (Japanese); Kim Chae-rin (Korean) (Huohuo)
Voiced by: Liu Beichen (Chinese); Adam Michael Gold (2023–2024), Aaron Veach (2024–present) (English); Takeshi Hirabayashi (Japanese); Han Bok-hyun (Korean) (Tail)
Huohuo is a foxian trainee judge of the Ten-Lords Commission on the Luofu. She has a fear of inhuman beings, but ironically attracts them due to a heliobus, a spirit-like being, whom she calls "Mr. Tail" (尾巴; Wěiba), sealed in her tail by the other judges.
Jiaoqiu (椒丘; Jiāoqiū)
Voiced by: Chenzhang Taikang (Chinese); Mark Whitten (English); Toshiyuki Toyonaga (Japanese); Lee Jung-min (Korean)
Jiaoqiu is a foxian counselor and a healer of the Alchemy Commission on the Yaoqing who was blinded after poisoning his blood to stall the borisin leader, Hoolay.
Jing Yuan (景元; Jǐng Yuán)
Voiced by: Sun Ye, Zhong Ke (young) (Chinese); Alejandro Saab, Brenna Larsen (young) (English); Daisuke Ono, Yūka Matsumi (young) (Japanese); Ryu Seung-gon, Kim Yea-lim (young) (Korean)
Jing Yuan is one of the seven Arbiter-Generals and the general of the Luofu.
Jingliu (镜流; Jìngliú)
Voiced by: Du Mingya (Chinese); AmaLee (English); Houko Kuwashima (Japanese); Park Yi-seo (Korean)
The leader of the now-defunct group, the High-Cloud Quintet. Jingliu was the sword master of the Luofu and Jing Yuan's mentor until she succumbed to mara, a curse that caused its host to become insane, and began attacking her former allies.
Li Sushang (李素裳; Lǐ Sùshang)
Voiced by: Chen Tingting (Chinese); Anjali Kunapaneni (English); Misato Fukuen (Japanese); Park Shi-yoon (Korean)
Sushang is a young Cloud Knight who wields a large sword and yearns to become a legend. A friend of Guinaifen, she assists in some of her acrobatic stunts and almost always appears in her livestreams.
Lingsha (灵砂; Língshā)
Voiced by: Rao Zijun (Chinese); Whitney Holland (English); Kaori Maeda (Japanese); Jang Ye-na (Korean)
Lingsha, whose real name is Dan Zhu (丹朱; Dān Zhū), is a Vidyadhara healer and the head of the Alchemy Commission on the Luofu.
Luocha (罗刹; Luóchà)
Voiced by: Zhao Lu (Chinese); Craig Lee Thomas (English); Akira Ishida (Japanese); Shin Yong-woo (Korean)
Luocha is a foreign trader who is often seen carrying a huge coffin. His true background is a mystery, but Jing Yuan suspects him of having smuggled a Stellaron onboard the Luofu, and Welt suspects him of being linked to Void Archives, Welt's past acquaintance.
Moze (貊泽; Mòzé)
Voiced by: Huang Jinze (Chinese); Ben Balmaceda (English); Shogo Sakata (Japanese); Choi Hyun-sik (Korean)
Moze is a sneaky, fastidious assassin and Feixiao's assistant. He usually remains hidden, only appearing when it's time to assassinate his enemies.
Qingque (青雀; Qīngquè)
Voiced by: Liu Shisi (Chinese); Bryn Apprill (English); Arisa Date (Japanese); Seo Da-hye (Korean)
Qingque is a librarian and a diviner of the Divination Commission on the Luofu. Although incredibly intelligent, she prefers to spend her time slacking off and playing Celestial Jade, a tile-based game heavily inspired by mahjong, rather than working.
Tingyun (停云; Tíngyún)

Voiced by: Jiang Li (Chinese); Laci Morgan (2023–2024), Anya Floris (2024–present) (English); Yūki Takada (Japanese); Lee Myeong-ho (Korean)
Tingyun is an eloquent foxian and a trade envoy of the Sky-Faring Commission on the Luofu. During the Xianzhou Luofu chapter, the Tingyun encountered by the Astral Express crew was not the real one, but a vessel possessed by Phantylia, who had stolen her identity and presumably killed her. The real Tingyun was later rescued from the brink of death by Ruan Mei and became known as Fugue (忘归人; Wàngguīrén).
Xueyi (雪衣; Xuěyī)
Voiced by: Suxun (Chinese); Jenny Yokobori (English); Maki Kawase (Japanese); Park Ri-na (Korean)
Xueyi is a judge of the Ten-Lords Commission on the Luofu and Hanya's older sister. Her natural body was destroyed, but she was resurrected into a puppet body.
Yao Guang (爻光; Yáo Guāng)
Voiced by: Qin Ziyi (Chinese); Ari Thrash (English); Kana Hanazawa (Japanese); Lee Seul (Korean)
Yao Guang is one of the seven Arbiter-Generals and the general of the Yuque.
Yanqing (彦卿; Yànqīng)
Voiced by: Miao Jiang (Chinese); Amber May (English); Marina Inoue (Japanese); Lee Sae-a (Korean)
The lieutenant of the Cloud Knights on the Luofu and Jing Yuan's retainer. Yanqing seeks to become the Luofu's sword master.
Yukong (驭空; Yùkōng)
Voiced by: Zhong Ke (Chinese); Dawn M. Bennett (English); Yumi Tōma (Japanese); Jeon Sook-kyeong (Korean)
Yukong is a foxian former wartime pilot and the head of the Sky-Faring Commission on the Luofu.
Yunli (云璃; Yúnlí)

Voiced by: Liu Wen (Chinese); Brenna Larsen (English); Shion Wakayama (Japanese); Lee Ju-eun (Korean)
Yunli is a sword hunter from the Zhuming and the adoptive granddaughter of Huaiyan.

=== Penacony ===
Penacony (匹诺康尼; Pǐnuòkāngní) is a resort planet. It was originally built as a penal colony of the Interastral Peace Corporation (IPC). Physically, it houses a luxurious hotel called the Reverie, where visitors use special devices to enter a massive, shared dream world. The planet is governed by the Family, who follow the Path of Harmony.

Gallagher (加拉赫; Jiālāhè)
Voiced by: Ma Yufei (Chinese); Erik Braa (English); Satoshi Mikami (Japanese); Park Sang-hoon (Korean)
Gallagher is a security officer of the Bloodhound family who also works as a bartender. He is the result of an amalgamation of traits from present inhabitants of Penacony. His actual identity is that of an agent of the Path of Enigmata, an ally of the Watchmaker, and the keeper of the entity known as "Dormancy".
Misha (米沙; Mǐshā)
Voiced by: Liu Zhixiao (Chinese); Cat Protano (English); Eriko Matsui (Japanese); Bak Sin-hee (Korean)
Misha is a bellboy at the Reverie Hotel. His existence is a reflection of the Watchmaker (「钟表匠」; "Zhōngbiǎojiàng"), whose real name is Mikhail Char Legwork (拉格沃克·夏尔·米哈伊尔; Lāgéwòkè Xià'ěr Mǐhāyī'ěr).
Robin (知更鸟; Zhīgēngniǎo)

Voiced by: Qian Chen (Chinese); Alice Himora (English); Kaori Nazuka (Japanese); Shin On-yu (Korean); Chevy (song vocals)
Robin is an elegant Halovian singer and Sunday's sister. She uses the Path of Harmony to spread her music throughout the cosmos.

=== Amphoreus ===
Amphoreus (翁法罗斯; Wēngfǎluósī; 'Omphalos') is an isolated, simulated planet. It is the result of a recursive experiment managed by Lygus with the purpose of bringing forth Irontomb, an Emanator of Destruction. Amphoreus is locally governed by the Chrysos Heirs, who follow the Path of Remembrance.

Aglaea (阿格莱雅; Āgéláiyǎ)
Voiced by: Chu Yue (Chinese); Morgan Lauré (English); Aya Endō (Japanese); Oh Ro-ah (Korean)
Aglaea is one of the Chrysos Heirs, a group of heroes destined to inherit cores of the Titans' power called Coreflames, and serves as the demigod of Romance. She is the leader of the Chrysos Heirs and a weaver who uses golden threads.
Anaxa (那刻夏; Nàkèxià)
Voiced by: Qian Wenqing (Chinese); Stephen Fu (English); Yuma Uchida (Japanese); Lee Sang-jun (Korean)
Anaxagoras (阿那克萨戈拉斯; Ānàkèsàgēlāsī) is one of the Chrysos Heirs and the demigod of Reason. He is an enlightened scholar from the city of Grove of Epiphany.
Castorice (遐蝶; Xiádié)

Voiced by: Ruan Congqing (Chinese); Melody Muze (English); Chiwa Saitō (Japanese); Serena Lee (Korean)
Castorice is one of the Chrysos Heirs and the demigod of Death. She is an executioner by virtue of possessing the touch of death.
Cerydra (刻律德菈; Kèlǜdélā)

Voiced by: Shi Xinlei (Chinese); Rhiannon Moushall (English); Kanon Takao (Japanese); Kim Yun-chae (Korean)
Cerydra is one of the Chrysos Heirs and the demigod of Law. She is an arrogant tyrant who once ruled as the self-proclaimed ruler of the city of Okhema.
Cipher (赛飞儿; Sàifēi'ér)
Voiced by: Wang Yaxin (Chinese); Shea Fairaday (English); Ayasa Itō (Japanese); Mi So (Korean)
Cifera (赛法利娅; Sàifǎlìyà) is one of the Chrysos Heirs and the demigod of Trickery. She is a nimble kleptomaniac catgirl from the city of Dolos.
Cyrene (昔涟; Xīlián)

Voiced by: Yanning (Chinese); Aiden Dawn (English); Marina Inoue (Japanese); Jo Kyeong-i (Korean)
Cyrene is one of the Chrysos Heirs and Phainon's childhood friend from the village of Aedes Elysiae. She is also known as the Titan Demiurge (德谬歌; Démiùgē), and initially travels alongside the Trailblazer in the form of a small creature named Mem (迷迷; Mímí).
Hyacine (风堇; Fēngjǐn)
Voiced by: Jing Chen (Chinese); Holly Earl (English); Hina Yōmiya (Japanese); Kim Yeon-woo (Korean)
Hyacinthia (雅辛忒丝; Yǎxīntèsī) is one of the Chrysos Heirs and the demigod of Sky. She is a compassionate and whimsical physician from the Grove of Epiphany who acts as Anaxa's assistant lecturer.
Hysilens (海瑟音; Hǎisèyīn)
Voiced by: Fumeng Ruowei (Chinese); Rosie Day (English); Manaka Iwami (Japanese); Oh Eun-soo (Korean)
Helektra (海列屈拉; Hǎilièqūlā) is one of the Chrysos Heirs and the demigod of Ocean. She served as the knight commander of Okhema during Cerydra's rule.
Mydei (万敌; Wàndí)
Voiced by: Zhao Chengchen (Chinese); Gabriel Warburton (English); Yōhei Azakami (Japanese); Ahn Hyo-min (Korean)
Mydeimos (迈德谟斯; Màidémósī) is one of the Chrysos Heirs and the demigod of Strife. He is the crown prince of the city of Castrum Kremnos.
Phainon (白厄; Bái'è)

Voiced by: Qin Qiege, Mi Yang (young) (Chinese); Joshua Waters, Justine Huxley (young) (English); Satoshi Hino, Kotomi Aihara (young) (Japanese); Yoon Yong-sik, Park Ha-jin (young) (Korean)
Phainon, whose real name is Khaslana (卡厄斯兰那; Kǎ'èsīlánnà), is one of the Chrysos Heirs and the demigod of Worldbearing. According to prophecy, he is the fated deliverer who is destined to save Amphoreus and its inhabitants from a cycle of endless destruction. He endures a self-imposed recursive time loop of his world to prevent Amphoreus' decay and a cosmic catastrophe.
Tribbie (缇宝; Tíbǎo)
Voiced by: Cai Shujin (Chinese); Hayden Daviau (English); Hikaru Tono (Japanese); Bang Yeon-ji (Korean)
Together with Trianne (缇安; Tí'ān) and Trinnon (缇宁; Tíníng), they are collectively known as Tribios (缇里西庇俄丝; Tílǐxībì'ésī). Tribios is one of the Chrysos Heirs and the demigod of Passage. After inheriting the Passage Coreflame from the Titan Janus, she became the first demigod of Amphoreus.

=== Planarcadia ===
Planarcadia (二相乐园; Èrxiāng Lèyuán; 'Two-Phase Paradise'), formerly Benzaitengoku (弁才天国; Biàncáitiānguó), is an entertainment planet. It is where the Astral Express once crashed and departed on its current journey. The planet is ruled by IPC member Pearl, while its society and culture follow the Path of Elation.

Evanescia (绯英; Fēiyīng)
Voiced by: Suxun (Chinese); Nathalie Ferare (English); Ayane Sakura (Japanese); Moon Yoo-jeong (Korean)
Evanescia is the arbitrator of the Phantasmoon Games, a competition where the victor gains the power of Aha, the Aeon of Elation, for one minute. She later makes the Trailblazer a participant in the event.
Kuchiba (朽叶; Xiǔyè)
Voiced by: Li Chanfei (Chinese); Ariana Nicole George (English); Yū Kobayashi (Japanese); Kim A-rong (Korean)
Kuchiba is a security officer of the Department of Aberration Defense.
Nihilux (虚照; Xūzhào)
Voiced by: Ziyin (Chinese); Amber Lee Connors (English); Haruka Tomatsu (Japanese); Kwon Da-ye (Korean)
Nihilux, whose true identity is Aha (阿哈; Āhā), is a comic artist and former president of the magazine Furbobo Weekly.

== Characters by faction ==
=== Stellaron Hunters ===
The Stellaron Hunters (星核猎手; Xīnghé Lièshǒu) are a group of wanted criminals led by Elio, who possesses the ability to see future possibilities and writes "scripts" that the rest of the members follow toward a future where the universe survives total destruction. They follow the Path of Finality.

Blade (刃; Rèn)

Voiced by: Liu Yijia (Chinese); Daman Mills (English); Shin-ichiro Miki (Japanese); Kwak Yoon-sang (Korean)
Blade is a swordsman who abandoned his body to become a blade and a former member of the High-Cloud Quintet who went by the name Yingxing (应星; Yìngxīng). He is cursed with immortality after a failed ritual to resurrect fellow member Baiheng resulted in him becoming mara-struck.
Firefly (流萤; Liúyíng)

Voiced by: Song Yuanyuan (Chinese); Analesa Fisher (English); Tomori Kusunoki (Japanese); Yu Hye-ji (Korean) (Firefly)
Voiced by: Gan Ziqi (Chinese); Adin Rudd (English); Jun Kasama (Japanese); Jang Seo-hwa (Korean) (SAM)
Firefly is a young girl clad in a mechanical armor called SAM (萨姆; Sàmǔ). She joined the Stellaron Hunters in the hopes of finding the meaning of life and a way out of her doomed fate.
Kafka (卡芙卡; Kǎfúkǎ)

Voiced by: Xu Hui (Chinese); Cheryl Texiera (English); Shizuka Itō (Japanese); Sa Moon-young (Korean)
Kafka is a soft-spoken woman who is incapable of feeling fear. She personally implanted a Stellaron into a body now known as the Trailblazer during the opening events of the game. She is one of the first two people, along with Silver Wolf, that the Trailblazer met.
Silver Wolf (银狼; Yín Láng)

Voiced by: Hanser (Chinese); Melissa Fahn (English); Kana Asumi (Japanese); Jang Mi (Korean)
Silver Wolf is a master hacker who has excelled in a skill that alters reality called "aether editing". She is one of the first two people, along with Kafka, that the Trailblazer met.

=== Masked Fools ===
The Masked Fools (假面愚者; Jiǎmiàn Yúzhě) are a group of hedonists who often leave trouble in their wake. They follow the Path of Elation, and gather at a tavern called World's End.

Sampo Koski (桑博·科斯基; Sāngbó Kēsījī)
Voiced by: Liu Shengbo (Chinese); Roger Rose (English); Daisuke Hirakawa (Japanese); Jeong Jae-heon (Korean)
Sampo is a notorious con artist wanted across Belobog. He ends up supporting Wildfire and the Trailblazer in his own way.
Sparkle (花火; Huāhuǒ)

Voiced by: Zhao Shuang (Chinese); Lizzie Freeman (English); Reina Ueda (Japanese); Sung Ye-won (Korean)
Sparkle is a manipulative trickster who can shapeshift into anyone. She uses this ability solely for her amusement. One of her personas, Sparxie (火花; Huǒhuā), takes the form of an online streamer in Planarcadia.

=== Interastral Peace Corporation ===
The IPC (星际和平公司; Xīngjì Hépíng Gōngsī) is a megacorporation that operates across many star systems and controls much of the economy in the game's universe. The company follows the Path of Preservation.

Aventurine (砂金; Shājīn)

Voiced by: Yang Chaoran, Pi Xiugang (young) (Chinese); Camden Sutkowski, Caitlyn Elizabeth (young) (English); Kengo Kawanishi (Japanese); Park Jun-won (Korean)
Aventurine, whose real name is Kakavasha (卡卡瓦夏; Kǎkǎwǎxià), is one of the Ten Stonehearts, a high-ranking group within the IPC. He is the bearer of a Cornerstone, an artifact made from the body of Qlipoth, the Aeon of Preservation, called the "Aventurine of Stratagems". He is a gambler by nature, treating life as a high-risk, high-reward investment.
Jade (翡翠; Fěicuì)
Voiced by: Zhang Ruoyu (Chinese); Faye Mata (English); Kotono Mitsuishi (Japanese); Kim Soon-mi (Korean)
Jade is one of the Ten Stonehearts and the bearer of the Cornerstone "Jade of Credit". A pawnbroker, she is willing to lend people anything they want as long as she receives something of equivalent value in her eyes.
Pearl (真珠; Zhēnzhū)
Voiced by: Su Wan (Chinese); Cat Protano (English); Kiyono Yasuno (Japanese); Yeo Yoon-mi (Korean)
Pearl is one of the Ten Stonehearts and the bearer of the Cornerstone "Pearl of Appraisal". She is the secretary of the Strategic Investment Department and Planarcadia's current CEO.
Topaz (托帕; Tuōpà)
Voiced by: Lu Minyue (Note: Additionally voices Numby for all languages) (Chinese); Sam Slade (English); Yoshino Nanjō (Japanese); Bang Si-u (Korean)
Topaz, whose real name is Jelena (叶琳娜; Yèlínnà), is one of the Ten Stonehearts and the bearer of the Cornerstone "Topaz of Debt Retrieval". Her partner Numby (账账; Zhàngzhàng), an interdimensional-travelling creature called a warp trotter, can locate treasures within a particular radius.

=== Galaxy Rangers ===
The Galaxy Rangers (巡海游侠; Xúnhǎi Yóuxiá) are a voluntary group of individuals from many worlds who travel the cosmos to uphold justice for those they encounter. They follow the Path of the Hunt.

Ashveil (不死途; Bùsǐtú)
Voiced by: Zhang Pei (Chinese); Blythe Melin (English); Takehito Koyasu (Japanese); Kang Soo-jin (Korean)
Ashveil, also known as La Mancha (拉曼查; Lā Mànchá), is an eccentric detective and the director of the Ashen Detective Agency in Planarcadia. He is the leader of the Galaxy Rangers.
Boothill (波提欧; Bōtí'ōu)
Voiced by: Peng Bo, Kinsen (young) (Chinese); Andrew Russell (English); Katsuyuki Konishi (Japanese); Kim Dan (Korean)
Boothill is a cyborg cowboy who seeks revenge on the IPC for destroying his home planet and his daughter despite the massive bounty they placed on his head. A pre-installed language module in his body, called the Synesthesia Beacon, censors his use of profanity against his will.
Rappa (乱破; Luànpò)
Voiced by: Jin Na (Chinese); Kendell Byrd (English); Megumi Han (Japanese); Kim Yu-rim (Korean)
Rappa is an experimental test subject who was implanted with a memetic virus based on a popular ninja manga at a young age. After being freed from captivity, she became a Galaxy Ranger but still interprets everything through the eyes of a ninja.

== Main antagonists ==
Cocolia Rand (可可利亚·兰德; Kěkělìyǎ Lándé)
Voiced by: Mufei (Chinese); Heather Gonzalez (English); Misa Katō (Japanese); Lee Mi-na (Korean)
The eighteenth ruler of Belobog and the adoptive mother of Bronya. Cocolia serves as the main antagonist of the Belobog chapter.
Phantylia (幻胧; Huànlóng)
Voiced by: Huang Ying (Chinese); Tara Langella (English); Yurika Hino (Japanese); Yoo Bo-ra (Korean)
Phantylia is a powerful heliobus and an Emanator of Destruction who infiltrated the Xianzhou Luofu, disguised as Tingyun, to revive the Ambrosial Arbor, an ancient tree, and incite a civil war. She serves as the main antagonist of the Xianzhou Luofu chapter and was ultimately defeated. It was later discovered that under the alias "Mangas", she rallied the borisin packs in freeing their leader Hoolay and sowing chaos during the Wardance, a festival held in honor of Lan, the Aeon of The Hunt.
Lygus (来古士; Láigǔshì)
Voiced by: Zhao Junyi (Chinese); Blythe Melin (English); Shuntarō Karato (Japanese); Park Ki-wook (Korean)
The true administrator of Amphoreus and the main antagonist of the Amphoreus chapter. Lycurgus (吕枯耳戈斯; Lǚkū'ěrgēsī) is a fragment of the founder and member #1 of the Genius Society, Zandar One Kuwabara (赞达尔·壹·桑原; Zàndá'ěr Yī Sāngyuán), and plotted to materialize Irontomb to destroy the Path of Erudition.
Asat Pramad (归寂; Guījì)
Voiced by: Zhang Huzi (Chinese); Joe Hernandez (English); Eiji Hanawa (Japanese); Shin Kyung-sun (Korean)
Asat Pramad is an Emanator of Destruction who serves as the main antagonist of the Planarcadia chapter. His real name is unknown, but he was known by several aliases such as Enroute (未抵; Wèidǐ), a former Masked Fool, and Isee (我见; Wǒjiàn), a former Astral Express navigator. He also killed Murata Ryusuke (无量塔隆介; Wúliàngtǎ Lóngjiè), Himeko's father, before he could return to Planarcadia, and assumed his identity for roughly 15 years.

== Other characters ==
Acheron (黄泉; Huángquán)

Voiced by: Juhuahua (Chinese); Allegra Clark (English); Miyuki Sawashiro (Japanese); Park Ji-yoon (Korean)
Acheron, whose real name is Raiden Bōsenmori Mei (雷电忘川守芽衣; Léidiàn Wàngchuānshǒu Yáyī), is a cosmic drifter and an Emanator of Nihility. She claims to be a Galaxy Ranger, earning the ire of Boothill, who points out she's an impostor using their name. She carries a long sword reminiscent of an ōdachi.
Argenti (银枝; Yínzhī)
Voiced by: Liang Dawei (Chinese); Adam Michael Gold (2023–2024), Talon Warburton (2024–present) (English); Shinnosuke Tachibana (Japanese); Choi Seung-hun (Korean)
Argenti is a cosmic drifter and a Knight of Beauty who travels the cosmos performing heroic deeds like an old-fashioned knight-errant, hoping to one day see the reappearance of Idrila, the currently missing Aeon of Beauty.
Black Swan (黑天鹅; Hēi Tiān'é)
Voiced by: Yang Menglu (Chinese); Arryn Zech (English); Hitomi Nabatame (Japanese); Kim Ha-young (Korean)
Black Swan is a mysterious collector of memories called a Memokeeper, from the Garden of Recollection. She later accompanies the Astral Express as a passenger in travelling to Amphoreus.
Constance (康士坦丝; Kāngshìtǎnsī)
Voiced by: Ruan Congqing (Chinese); Jennifer Losi (2024–2025), Cristina Vee (2025–present) (English); Mikoi Sasaki (Japanese); Kim Do-hee (Korean)
Constance, also known as The Dahlia (大丽花; Dàlìhuā), is a member of the now-disbanded group Ever-Flame Mansion. She left the group along with others after their leader Duke Inferno was assassinated by Acheron and now serves as a Memokeeper from the rogue group, the Cremators.
Dr. Ratio (真理医生; Zhēnlǐ Yīshēng)
Voiced by: Sang Yuze (Chinese); Jordan Paul Haro (English); Shunsuke Takeuchi (Japanese); Lee Dong-hoon (Korean)
Veritas Ratio (维里塔斯·拉帝奥; Wéilǐtǎsī Lādì'ào) is an eccentric, self-assured Intelligentsia Guild member who often conceals his appearance with an alabaster head. He treats ignorance as a disease and aims to cure it by spreading knowledge throughout the universe.
Screwllum (螺丝咕姆; Luósīgūmǔ)
Voiced by: Zhao Yang (Chinese); Steven Kelly (English); Yūya Uchida (Japanese); Lee Min-kyu (Korean)
Screwllum is an intellitron, a robot-like species, and member #76 of the Genius Society.

== Crossover characters ==
=== Fate ===
Archer
Voiced by: Wu Lei (Chinese); Junichi Suwabe (Japanese); Lim Chae-heon (Korean)
Archer is the alternate future version of Fate/Stay Night protagonist Shirou Emiya (卫宫士郎; Wèigōng Shìláng). He is summoned during the crossover events in Penacony as Aventurine's servant, and in Planarcadia as Ishtar's servant.
Gilgamesh (吉尔伽美什; Jí'ěrjiāměishí)
Voiced by: Teng Xin (Chinese); Tomokazu Seki (Japanese); Kim Jong-yeop (Korean)
Gilgamesh is a hero in Mesopotamian mythology and ruler of the Sumerian city-state of Uruk. He appears during the crossover event in Planarcadia after being dragged there by the goddess Ishtar.
Ishtar (伊什塔尔; Yīshítǎ'ěr)
Ishtar is the Mesopotamian goddess of beauty, war, and fertility. She is the main antagonist of the "Imagenae: Holy Grail War" story quest in Planarcadia. She uses the body of Rin Tohsaka as her vessel.
Lancer
Voiced by: Hu Yi (Chinese); Nobutoshi Canna (Japanese); Shin Beom-sik (Korean)
Lancer, whose true identity is Cú Chulainn (库·丘林; Kù Qiūlín), is a hero of the Ulster Cycle in Irish mythology. He is summoned during the crossover events in Penacony as Boothill's servant, and in Planarcadia as Kuchiba's servant.
Rin Tohsaka (远坂凛; Yuǎnbǎn Lǐn)

Voiced by: Shuo Xiaotu (Chinese); Kana Ueda (Japanese); Kim Bo-min (Korean)
Rin is the head of the Tohsaka family of mages and one of the main heroines of Fate/Stay Night. She appears during the crossover event in Planarcadia as the Trailblazer's master.
Saber

Voiced by: Bai Xinzan (Chinese); Ayako Kawasumi (Japanese); Jeong Yu-jeong (Korean)
Saber, whose true identity is Altria Pendragon (阿尔托莉雅·潘德拉贡; Ā'ěrtuōlìyǎ Pāndélāgòng), is a hero in Arthurian legend and one of the main heroines of Fate/Stay Night. She is summoned during the crossover events in Penacony as the Trailblazer's servant, and in Planarcadia as Phainon's servant.

=== Zenless Zone Zero ===
Astra Yao (耀嘉音; Yào Jiāyīn)
Voiced by: Xiao N (Chinese); Molly Zhang (English); Aya Endō (Japanese); Yoon A-yeong (Korean); Yu Zibei (song vocals)
Astra Yao is the lead singer of the musical group Stars of Lyra.
Ellen Joe (艾莲·乔; Àilián Qiáo)
Voiced by: Xiao Qingyuan (Chinese); TBD (English); Shion Wakayama (Japanese); Lee Ji-na (Korean)
Ellen is a maid working for the Victoria Housekeeping employment agency located at the city of New Eridu.

== Reception ==
Honkai: Star Rail was praised by many critics for its continuation of miHoYo's excellent character design, which highlights the game's expressive and well-developed cast. (Note: Attributed to multiple sources) Tyler Colp from PC Gamer noted that every character in the game has a lot of personality and the characters have "extraordinarily expressive" combat animations. Samantha Low from GamesHub noted that all characters are very engaging, with vibrant designs which resemble a high-tech fashion show. Water Ash from IGN China noted that the characters are well designed to cater to a wide variety of fans, with expressive and detailed facial animations. Nat Smith from PCGamesN noted that the characters have strong individual appeal, with relatable archetypes evoking 1990s Japanese role-playing games. Smith also noted that there are some great NPCs in the game, with even minor figures having an important role in the story. Jess Reyes from IGN noted that the characters slowly reveal their personalities throughout different scenarios, making the story more suspenseful.

== Controversies ==
=== Casting of Chris Niosi ===
In July 2024, HoYoverse, miHoYo's global publishing brand, revealed the English voice actor for the character Moze to be Chris Niosi. Immediately after the reveal, HoYoverse received backlash from players due to Niosi's past abuse allegations in 2019, which were affirmed by Niosi himself. Following the backlash, Niosi withdrew from the role days later and HoYoverse replaced him with Ben Balmaceda. Niosi's recorded voice lines were later fully replaced in subsequent versions, and Moze debuted with Balmaceda as his English voice actor.

=== SAG-AFTRA strike controversies ===
From 2024 to 2025, HoYoverse was affected by strike action from multiple English voice actors affiliated with SAG-AFTRA. Although HoYoverse wasn't listed as one of the companies targeted in the main strike, multiple English voice actors in support of the strike stopped voicing their assigned characters. HoYoverse responded by replacing some of the striking voice actors, including the voice actors for the Trailblazer, Tingyun, Argenti, and Tail.
