= Blade (Honkai) =

Video game character

- Honkai character
- Official artwork in Honkai: Star Rail
- First game: Honkai: Star Rail (2023)
- Voiced by: EN: Daman Mills; ZH: Liu Yijia; JA: Shin-ichiro Miki; KO: Kwak Yoon-sang

In-universe information
- Full name: Yingxing
- Weapon: Sword
- Origin: The Xianzhou Luofu
- Types: Wind, Fire
- Paths: Destruction, Nihility (combat); Abundance, Finality (lore)

Blade (Chinese: 刃; pinyin: Rèn; lit. 'edge'), otherwise known as Yingxing (应星; Yīngxīng), is a character from the Honkai video game series developed by miHoYo. In Honkai: Star Rail, Blade is a member of the criminal organization known as the Stellaron Hunters. He is a former weaponsmith who yearns for death but cannot achieve it due to him being immortal. Blade first appeared as a playable character in version 1.2 of the game.

In 2026, an alternative playable version of him called Mortenax Blade (千冶·刃; Qiānyě: Rèn; 'Thousand Forgings: Blade') was released. Blade's health-draining gameplay style, in which he sacrifices some of his hit points in exchange for damage, drew media attention upon his release. His backstory caused widespread discussion within the player community, with media outlets analyzing Blade's character history.

== Design and voice acting ==
miHoYo first revealed information about Blade in a promotional program for version 1.1 of the game on May 22, 2023, introducing him as a swordsman who wields a cracked sword and who was loyal to the Stellaron Hunters, a criminal organization. In July, the company released trailers detailing his character. Blade was released as a playable character in version 1.2 of the game on July 19. On April 7, 2026, miHoYo announced the release of a new version of Blade called "Mortenax Blade" in version 4.3. Mortenax Blade was released on June 1, 2026. Players who obtained Mortenax Blade during his first banner could claim a new player character accessory for free. Japanese women's magazine An An published an interview with Mortenax Blade in a special edition for his release.

Blade is afflicted by a curse known as mara, which grants him immortality and extremely powerful regenerative abilities. In the past, he was known as Yingxing, a swordsmith and member of a legendary group known as the High-Cloud Quintet.

Official portrait of Mortenax Blade

On April 7, 2026, miHoYo released Mortenax Blade's character artwork. Mortenax Blade is presented as Blade's new form following the events of the Planarcadia story arc. The text accompanying his character artwork describes him as having a "body like spring wood, a heart like dead ashes, yet the sparks of a craftsman still linger at the fingertips." It goes on to ask, "[t]orn flesh, tempered a thousand times into a blade... what kind of answer will it forge?". During the version 4.3 promotional livestream, the development team stated that Blade's transformation and experiences are also reflected in this form's abilities in combat. His ultimate uses his own body as a furnace to reforge a broken sword. When he uses his ultimate again while in the Hellscape state, the ability changes into another form that reveals his "true form of wrath". In this state, he is no longer troubled by the past or bound by mara (a type of disease in the game). The design of his outfit also corresponds to this wrathful form. In the story, it is a memento left out by Blade for the game's protagonist, the Trailblazer, who accompanies him before setting out on a mission. An official introductory video also states that Blade continues to wield his broken sword in battle because it represents him better than anything else.

Both versions of Blade are voiced in Chinese by Liu Yijia, in English by Daman Mills, in Japanese by Shin-ichiro Miki, and in Korean by Kwak Yoon-sang. Liu appeared as a guest on the Chinese-language version of the promotional livestream and shared his thoughts on completing the voice work for version 4.3. He said that when he first saw the character, his initial impression was of someone consumed by pain who has a tendency to self-destruct. However without realizing it, Blade underwent considerable change in the story in terms of how he sees his relationships with others. Miki said that Blade is a complex character who appears taciturn on the outside but carries burning emotions with him. Blade does not say much, giving the impression of being cold and difficult to approach, even seeming indifferent to his surroundings. However, he has an intense fixation on his goal and an unwavering will. Miki particularly noted that Blade harbors very deep negative feelings towards Dan Heng; this hatred is one of the few points where Blade shows emotional fluctuation. In terms of voice acting, because Blade's lines are so few, the recording process went smoothly for Miki. He focused on condensing the character's inner thoughts and feelings into his brief lines with great density, rather than conveying them via surface-level tone. He felt that Blade's appeal lies not only in his cold aura, but also in the unique "dignity" and elegance that radiate from each subtle movement.

In 2025 it was announced that Blade would be a playable character in Honkai: Nexus Anima.

== Appearances ==
=== Story ===
Blade's original name was Yingxing. His species and planet of origin are unknown, but it is stated in the game that his home planet was destroyed by the Borisin, a species following the path of Abundance. At some point after the destruction of his home planet, he became of disciple of Huaiyan, a military leader. Yingxing was once a member of the High-Cloud Quintet, a legendary group in the history of the Xianzhou Alliance and a gifted artisan who specialized in forging weapons. The Xianzhou Alliance is an ancient, space-faring civilization largely consisting of starships. During a battle against the antagonist Shuhu, a powerful being known as an Emanator of Abundance, Blade's close friend and fellow High-Cloud Quintet member Baiheng was killed, causing the group to fall apart. In an attempt to revive her, fellow High-Cloud Quintet member Dan Feng (who would later reincarnate as Dan Heng) used a forbidden art called the Transmutation Arcanum while Yingxing assisted in the ritual using Shuhu's flesh and blood. The ritual failed and brought about disaster to the Xianzhou: through contact with Shuhu's flesh, Yingxing gained immortality but was also cursed with a condition called "mara", and was unable to die despite his suffering. He is implied to have been imprisoned for some amount of time, then jailbroken by Jingliu, who repeatedly struck him down and gave him his new purpose in life, in the process permanently damaging his hands and rendering him physically incapable of continuing to work as a craftsman. He abandoned the name Yingxing, and accepted the Stellaron Hunters' invitation to join their group, taking on the name "Blade." Following the directions of the group's leader, Elio, he took part in various operations in search of a way to die, which had been prophesied by Elio by what the latter called a "script". Because Dan Feng was reincarnated as Dan Heng, Blade continues to pursue Dan Heng throughout the game, ultimately forcing the latter to board the Astral Express.

Later, during the events of the game's main story, Blade follows Elio's script and arrives on the planet Planarcadia ahead of the protagonists alongside fellow Stellaron Hunter Silver Wolf. After someone scatters Shuhu's flesh throughout Duomension City, Blade hides a sword, which he forged when he was still known as Yingxing, inside his body so he can absorb all of the scattered flesh while remaining conscious. Once the absorption is complete, Shuhu's flesh grows into a great tree beside him, which Silver Wolf helps seal away. After it is revealed that Duomension City contains the remains of the Aeon of Voracity, Xianzhou general Yao Guang proposes burying Shuhu at the end of the planet's World in Canvas (a type of pocket dimension) to dissolve him completely. This is intended to both suppress Shuhu permanently and to keep Shuhu's flesh from falling into the wrong hands. Because Shuhu's flesh is sealed within Blade's body, the plan would require Blade to be dissolved along with it. He does not hesitate in choosing this option. Drawing on Yingxing's craft as a weaponsmith, he treats his own body and Shuhu's flesh as material for forging a sword, casting them into a furnace in what is described as "Torn flesh, tempered a thousand times into a blade." Because Elio's script leaves this part unwritten, whether Blade ultimately dies or is reborn remains uncertain. Having endured the tempering process, Blade finally resolves his feud with Shuhu and returns in the new form of Mortenax Blade, while also bidding farewell to his former self.

=== Gameplay ===
Blade is a 5-star rarity character who deals Wind damage and walks the Path of the Destruction. His normal Basic Attack deals Wind damage to a single enemy. During the Hellscape state, it consumes 10% of his maximum hit points and deals Wind damage to a single enemy, and a lesser amount of Wind damage to adjacent enemies. If consuming 10% of his maximum hit points would result in losing them all, Blade's hit points are set to 1 instead. His Skill causes him to enter into the Hellscape state, during which his ATK is increased, and his Basic Attack is enhanced for three turns. His ultimate sets his health to half of his maximum hit points and deals Wind damage to one enemy. At the same time, Blade deals Wind damage to adjacent targets.

Mortenax Blade is a 5-star rarity character who deals Fire damage and who walks the Path of the Nihility. His Basic Attack deals Fire damage equal to a set portion of his maximum hit points to one enemy, who then enters the Taunt state for one turn. His Skill consumes a set portion of his maximum hit points and deals Fire damage to all enemies. His ultimate reduces enemies' Defense stats and consumes one-fifth of his maximum hit points to deploy an object called a Zone. While the Zone is active, Mortenax Blade enters a state called "Infinite Fury". In that state, he unlocks his Skill and cannot be downed; instead, the Zone will end and his hit points will be recovered. Additionally, his Crit Rate and Crit DMG stats are both increased while the Zone is active.

In March 2025, HoYoverse announced they would directly enhance the skills of several characters, including Blade, Silver Wolf, and Kafka; these changes were implemented in version 3.4 of the game.

== Promotion ==
In August 2023, the Taiwanese beverage chain COMEBUY collaborated with Honkai: Star Rail to release three character-themed drinks: one each for Kafka, Silver Wolf, and their fellow Stellaron Hunter, Blade. The drinks were sold with bonus merchandise featuring Kafka's character, including in-game item cards, exclusive character stickers, and themed coasters. On the first day of the event, COMEBUY stores were surrounded by fans, with lines continuing for twelve hours straight at one particular branch. In 2026, miHoYo partnered with Epic Games to release Kafka and Blade avatars for use in Fortnite. The skins were released on February 26 and sold in bundles.

== Reception ==
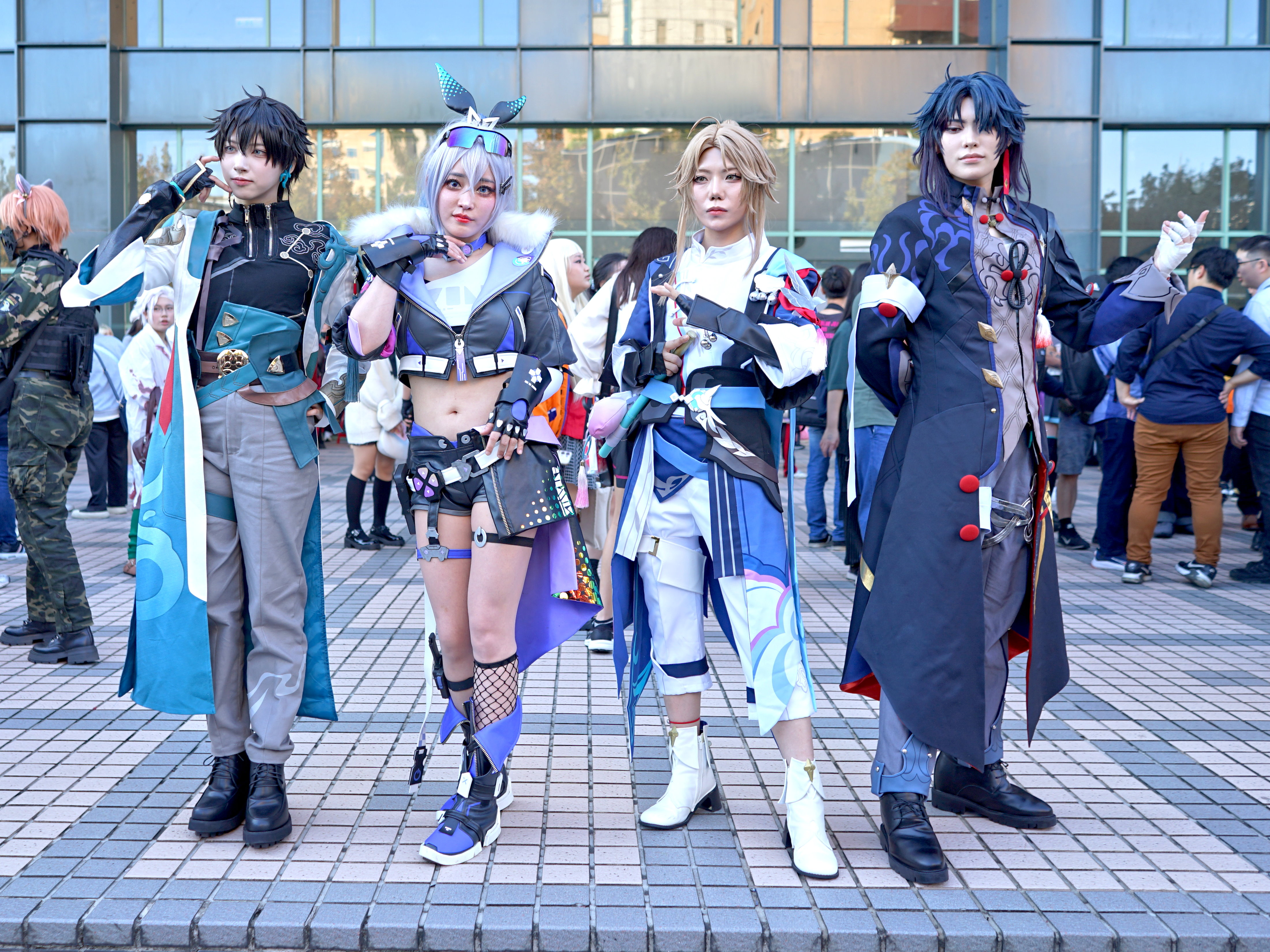
Cosplays of four characters from left to right: Dan Heng, Silver Wolf, Yanqing and Blade

Blade was generally received well by critics and reviewers. Fans expressed their love for the character by cosplaying as him.

Blade's appearance was praised by critics. Writer Moon Won-bin of GameToc described the character as handsome, and characterized him as "a berserker with explosive AoE damage and the distinctive appeal of a Destruction character". A writer for An An called his physique "striking" and his stance imposing, saying that it conveys the powerful core strength he has gained in the course of his training. Yan Ku of Yahoo News called Blade "badass".

Moon characterized Blade as having a cold appearance which was "consumed by madness". A writer for Famitsu argued that he showed a childlike side to him before he became immortal, feeling discouraged by the inherent limits on how much knowledge he could acquire due to his limited lifespan. He was characterized as revenge-driven in his youth, adding that the Xianzhou Zhuming itself contained enough material to carry an entire story. Willa Rowe of Inverse speculated that Dan Heng may be the reason why Blade became immortal in the first place, citing a comment by Welt Yang that Dan Heng might be "running from something." Delle Tribdino of GameDaily said that although Blade was originally a regular human, his life had been artificially extended by the Abundance for centuries longer than a human's expected lifespan, and that Mortenax Blade's new Path (Nihility) was likely tied very closely to his immortality and longing for death.

Blade's relationship and history in relation to Dan Heng and Dan Feng was heavily analyzed as well. Siliconera writer Bailey Vanderlee argued that everything that happened between Blade and Dan Feng decided both of their fates and that Blade was an important piece of the High-Cloud Quintet. She analyzed the relationship between the two as very close, even to the point of holding a cup-exchanging ceremony to symbolize the closeness between them. She wrote that it was unclear why Blade and Dan Feng used the Transmutation Arcanum, but that she would not be surprised if it was because they did not want to live without the other. Furthermore, she characterized the present relationship between the two as a game of cat and mouse, even after Blade and Dan Heng respectively joined the Stellaron Hunters and Astral Express. In her view, Blade is portrayed as both a victim whose love turned into hatred and a catalyst for the story: he is proof of Dan Feng's sins. Before version 1.4, some fans believed that Dan Feng had committed a grave sin by granting Blade immortality out of a deep romantic or personal bond. When it was revealed that Dan Feng had actually used the Transmutation Arcanum to try and resurrect Baiheng and that Yingxing merely helped him, this deeply upset players who were heavily invested in the romantic interpretation of the relationship between the two men. There was severe backlash against one of miHoYo's writers, who was accused of deliberately altering an implied romantic storyline between the two, as well as "fridging" Baiheng. The miHoYo writer was also accused of intentionally writing the story this way to anger the game's female player base. Commentator Bruno Yonezawa of Screen Rant ultimately defended the game's writing, arguing that while there may have been minor plot holes in the story, Blade's Companion Mission actually provided ample explanation for the tragedy, and noting that miHoYo never actually officially confirmed the romance.

There was some speculation about Blade's future role in the game's story as well. Tribdino said that the Stellaron Hunters were likely to play a significant role over the course of the Planarcadia story arc, due to the fact that both Blade and Silver Wolf were given alternative forms starting in version 4.0 of the game, when Planarcadia was introduced. An An said that Blade is one of the people holding the key to the Trailblazer's journey in Planarcadia, and Tribdino indicated that she believed it was likely that Blade would join the Phantasmoon Games as a Supplicant. She also said he may play a role in advancing the plot in regards to the Herald of Death, a serial killer who murdered several people during a previous iteration of the Phantasmoon Games. Daz Skubich of Pocket Tactics said that some fans speculated that Blade may join the Astral Express later.

Regarding gameplay, 4Gamers described Blade as a central example of the "HP-draining" playstyle used in the game. In a comparison between the two limited characters introduced in version 1.2, Yonezawa recommended Blade to players looking for something fresh in terms of combat attributes, although he felt that Kafka's gameplay was slightly more enjoyable. However, he said Blade's gameplay was more attractive because his Skill buffs his attacks without using up any Skill Points. HK01 writer Lin Zhuoheng analyzed Blade's build around maximizing his hit points in order to increase his damage, and considered him a flexible sub-DPS who could fit into a wide variety of teams. Moon wrote that defeating several enemies at once with Blade's AoE damage was "incredibly exhilarating".
