= Saori Ōnishi =

Japanese voice actress

- 大西 沙織
- Born: August 6, 1992 (age 34); Chiba Prefecture, Japan
- Occupation: Voice actress
- Years active: 2012–present
- Agent: I'm Enterprise
- Height: 156 cm (5 ft 1 in)
- Awards: 12th Seiyu Awards Best Supporting Actress; 12th Seiyu Awards Personality Award

Saori Ōnishi (大西 沙織, Ōnishi Saori; born August 6, 1992) is a Japanese voice actress who is affiliated with I'm Enterprise. She voiced La Folia Rihavein in her first main role for the anime series Strike the Blood. She is known for her roles as Mejiro McQueen in Umamusume: Pretty Derby, Alicia Charlotte in Aikatsu Friends!, Eriri Spencer Sawamura in Saekano, Ais Wallenstein in Is It Wrong to Try to Pick Up Girls in a Dungeon?, Vignette April Tsukinose in Gabriel DropOut, Miyako Shikimori in Shikimori's Not Just a Cutie, Akari Watanabe in More Than a Married Couple, But Not Lovers, Ruan Mei in Honkai: Star Rail, and Tamaki in Dead or Alive. She won the Best Supporting Actress award and the Personality Award at the 12th Seiyu Awards.

== Biography ==
Ōnishi began aspiring to become an actress in elementary school, while watching television. Maaya Sakamoto and Sanae Kobayashi inspired her to pursue the profession. While attending elementary and junior high school, Ōnishi was part of a brass band club. Although she was part of the science class in high school, she did not join any clubs. She attended a voice acting training school.

Ōnishi initially voiced characters in a number of drama CDs, before moving on to supporting roles in anime. Her first main role in an anime was as La Folia Rihavein in Strike the Blood. In 2014, she voiced Jamie Hazaford in Argevollen, Emi Murakami in Jinsei, and Kanon Chiyoda in The Irregular at Magic High School. Ōnishi voiced Eriri Spencer Sawamura in Saekano. She played the roles of Ais Warenstein in Is It Wrong to Try to Pick Up Girls in a Dungeon?, Hisako Arato in Food Wars!: Shokugeki no Soma, and Miyuki Kujō in Shomin Sample. In 2016, she played the roles of Kazuha Shibasaki in Girlish Number, Non Toyoguchi in Keijo, Madoka Amano in Active Raid, and Ai Ninomiya in Amanchu!. In August 2016, she visited Hong Kong to promote the game Ys VIII: Lacrimosa of Dana, in which she voiced Dana. In 2017, Ōnishi voiced Vignette April Tsukinose in Gabriel DropOut. She, Miyu Tomita, Naomi Ōzora, and Kana Hanazawa performed the series' opening theme "Gabriel Drop Kick", and ending theme "Hallelujah Essaim". She voiced Muramasa Senju in Eromanga Sensei, Marie Bell Breguet in Clockwork Planet, and Kuro in Restaurant to Another World. In 2018, she played Hiyori Jūjō in Katana Maidens ~ Toji No Miko, Ruka Irokawa in Comic Girls, and Beelzebub in As Miss Beelzebub Likes. In 2019, she played Nagi Kirima in Boogiepop and Others. She voiced Kaori Shirasaki in Arifureta: From Commonplace to World's Strongest. She voiced Alicia Charlotte in Aikatsu Friends!.

On February 22, 2022, she tested positive for COVID-19. In May 2023, her talent management agency announced that she would temporarily reduce her work activity due to health issues.

== Filmography ==
=== Anime ===
Year	Title	Role	Notes	Ref.
2012	AKB0048	Yūka Ichijō's younger sister		
2012	Little Busters!	Yamazaki		
2012	Love, Election and Chocolate	Female student C		
2012	Say I Love You	Akane		
2012	Tari Tari	Masami Ōtani, Ganba Pink		
2012	The Pet Girl of Sakurasou	Shiho Fukaya		
2013	AKB0048 next stage	Yūka Ichijō's younger sister, Woman B		
2013	A Certain Scientific Railgun S	Female Student C	Episode 1	
2013	Golden Time	Multiple roles (Note: Female Student B, Traveling Salesman, Female Believer 2, Female Upperclassman A, Female Guest 2, Female Upperclassman B.)	Episodes 1-3, 9, 12, 13, 17, 19	
2013	Kotoura-san	Multiple roles (Note: Kaoru, Class representative, Female high school student, Mobile phone voice, Boy B.)	Episodes 5, 7, 9, 11	
2013	Little Busters! Refrain	Child C	Episode 8	
2013	Miss Monochrome: The Animation	Idol	Episode 10	
2013	My Teen Romantic Comedy SNAFU	Female student, Volunteer control	Episodes 1, 10	
2013	Oreimo 2	Girl	Episode 1	
2013	Senki Zesshō Symphogear G	Ayumu Takasaka		
2013	Strike the Blood	La Folia Rihavein, Oshianas Girls		
2013	The Devil Is a Part-Timer!	Woman	Episode 5	
2013	Unbreakable Machine-Doll	Girl A (older sister)	Episode 1	
2013	WataMote	Naginata girl	Episode 4	
2013	Yuyushiki	Female student 1, Female student 2	Episodes 1, 2	
2014	Argevollen	Jamie Hazaford		
2014	Bladedance of Elementalers	Fianna Ray Ordesia		
2014	Jinsei	Emi Murakami		
2014	Selector Infected WIXOSS	Piruluk	Episodes 2-3, 6	
2014	The Irregular at Magic High School	Kanon Chiyoda		
2015	Food Wars!: Shokugeki no Soma	Hisako Arato		
2015	Gate	Mamina		
2015	Hello! Kin-iro Mosaic	Akari Kuzehashi		
2015	Is It Wrong to Try to Pick Up Girls in a Dungeon?	Ais Wallenstein		
2015	Is the Order a Rabbit??	Blowgun Club's President (Yura Karede)		
2015	Jewelpet: Magical Change	Sanagi, Butterfly		
2015	Mikagura School Suite	Seisa Mikagura		
2015	Monster Musume	Doppel	Episodes 6-12	
2015	Saekano	Eriri Spencer Sawamura		
2015	Shomin Sample	Miyuki Kujō		
2015	Tantei Kageki Milky Holmes TD	Crescendo		
2015	The Asterisk War	Laetitia Blanchard		
2015	Ultimate Otaku Teacher	Makina Momozono		
2015	Valkyrie Drive: Mermaid	Rain Hasumi		
2016	Active Raid	Madoka Amano		
2016	Amanchu!	Ai Ninomiya		
2016	Crayon Shin-chan	Ruriko		
2016	Flip Flappers	Irodori-senpai		
2016	Food Wars! The Second Plate	Hisako Arato		
2016	Girlish Number	Kazuha Shibasaki		
2016	Haruchika	Class representative	Episode 9	
2016	Heavy Object	Charlotte Zoom		
2016	Hundred	Nesat		
2016	Keijo	Non Toyoguchi		
2016	Lostorage incited WIXOSS	Kiyoi Mizushima		
2016	Please Tell Me! Galko-chan	Kibami, Cashier	Episodes 7, 8	
2016	Taboo Tattoo	Manisha	Episode 6	
2016	The Disastrous Life of Saiki K.	Pet owner	Episode 7	
2016	The Morose Mononokean	Anmo-hime		
2016	Undefeated Bahamut Chronicle	Altelize Mayclair		
2016	WWW.Working!!	Woman 2	Episode 1	
2017	Clockwork Planet	Marie Bell Breguet		
2017	Eromanga Sensei	Muramasa Senju		
2017	Food Wars! Shokugeki no Soma: The Third Plate	Hisako Arato	Also 2018	
2017	Fuuka	Hibiki Haruna		
2017	Gabriel DropOut	Vignette April Tsukinose		
2017	Sword Oratoria	Ais Wallenstein		
2017	Magical Circle Guru Guru	Runrun	Episodes 3-4, 7, 10-12, 15	
2017	Restaurant to Another World	Kuro		
2017	Saekano: How to Raise a Boring Girlfriend Flat	Eriri Spencer Sawamura		
2018	Alice or Alice	Ruha		
2018	Amanchu! Advance	Ai Nonomiya		
2018	As Miss Beelzebub Likes	Beelzebub		
2018	Comic Girls	Ruki Irokawa		
2018	Food Wars! Shokugeki no Soma: The Third Plate	Hisako Arato		
2018	Katana Maidens ~ Toji No Miko	Hiyori Jūjō	Also Mini Toji	
2018	Lostorage conflated WIXOSS	Kiyoi Mizushima		
2018	Ulysses: Jeanne d'Arc and the Alchemist Knight	Charlotte		
2018	Umamusume: Pretty Derby	Mejiro McQueen		
2019	Aikatsu Friends!	Alicia Charlotte		
2019	Arifureta: From Commonplace to World's Strongest	Kaori Shirasaki		
2019	Boogiepop and Others	Nagi Kirima		
2019	Isekai Cheat Magician	Arcena		
2019	Is It Wrong to Try to Pick Up Girls in a Dungeon? II	Ais Wallenstein		
2019	We Never Learn	Sawako Sekijou		
2019	YU-NO: A Girl Who Chants Love at the Bound of this World	Mitsuki Ichijō		
2019	Sword Art Online: Alicization - War of Underworld	Lenju	Episode 8	
2020	Haikyuu!!	Kanoka Amanai		
2020	Is It Wrong to Try to Pick Up Girls in a Dungeon? III	Ais Wallenstein		
2020	Is the Order a Rabbit? BLOOM	Yura Karede		
2020	Monster Girl Doctor	Saphentite Neikes		
2021	Blue Period	Hanako Sakuraba		
2021	LBX Girls	Kyōka		
2021	Osamake	Maria Momosaka		
2021	Restaurant to Another World 2	Kuro		
2021	Selection Project	Seira Kurusu		
2021	Shadows House	Sarah/Mia		
2021	Sonny Boy	Nozomi		
2021	Umamusume: Pretty Derby Season 2	Mejiro McQueen		
2022	Arifureta: From Commonplace to World's Strongest 2nd Season	Kaori Shirasaki		
2022	Aru Asa Dummy Head Mike ni Natteita Ore-kun no Jinsei	Yuri Asakusa		
2022	Don't Hurt Me, My Healer!	Cyclops Lady		
2022	Engage Kiss	Linhua Hachisuka		
2022	Extreme Hearts	Tomo Miyasiro		
2022	Girls' Frontline	Micro Uzi, M14		
2022	Love of Kill	Chateau Dankworth		
2022	Management of a Novice Alchemist	Iris Lotze		
2022	More Than a Married Couple, But Not Lovers	Akari Watanabe		
2022	Orient	Shunrai Yamamoto		
2022	Platinum End	Yuri Temari		
2022	Shikimori's Not Just a Cutie	Miyako Shikimori		
2022	Skeleton Knight in Another World	Yuriarna		
2023	Dr. Stone: New World	Amaryllis		
2023	Liar, Liar	Nanase Asamiya		
2023	Malevolent Spirits: Mononogatari	Tsubaki Kadomori		
2023	My Love Story with Yamada-kun at Lv999	Momoko Maeda		
2023	My Unique Skill Makes Me OP Even at Level 1	Celeste		
2023	Oshi no Ko	Yuki Sumi		
2023	Rurouni Kenshin	Takani Megumi		
2023	Summoned to Another World for a Second Time	Dezastol		
2023	The Aristocrat's Otherworldly Adventure: Serving Gods Who Go Too Far	Milly		
2023	You Were Experienced, I Was Not: Our Dating Story	Runa Shirakawa		
2024	Arifureta: From Commonplace to World's Strongest 3rd Season	Kaori Shirasaki		
2024	Dahlia in Bloom	Dahlia Rossetti		
2024	Mission: Yozakura Family	Me-chan		
2024	The Ossan Newbie Adventurer	Reanette Elfelt		
2024	Studio Apartment, Good Lighting, Angel Included	Noel Izumi		
2025	There's No Freaking Way I'll be Your Lover! Unless...	Mai Ouzuka		
2026	A Livid Lady's Guide to Getting Even	Elizabeth Leiston		
2026	An Adventurer's Daily Grind at Age 29	Jessica		
2026	A Misanthrope Teaches a Class for Demi-Humans	Isaki Ōgami		
2026	Jack-of-All-Trades, Party of None	Selma Clodel		
2026	Magical Explorer	Yukine Mizumori		
2026	Rich Girl Caretaker	Mirei Tennōji		
2026	Sentenced to Be a Hero	Frenci Mastibolt		
2026	Daemons of the Shadow Realm	Nagisa Kinjo		
2027	Nue's Exorcist	Nue		

=== Films ===
Year	Title	Role	Ref.
2013	Aura: Koga Maryuin's Last War	Sahara	
2013	The Garden of Sinners: Future Gospel	Naomi	
2016	Selector Infected WIXOSS	Piruluk	
2019	Is It Wrong to Try to Pick Up Girls in a Dungeon?: Arrow of the Orion	Ais Wallenstein	
2019	Saekano the Movie: Finale	Eriri Spencer Sawamura	
2020	Date A Live Fragment: Date A Bullet	White Queen	
2021	Tokyo 7th Sisters Movie: Bokura wa Aozora ni Naru	Alessandra Susu	
2021	Kin-iro Mosaic: Thank you!!	Akari Kuzehashi	
2024	Dead Dead Demon's Dededede Destruction	Hikari Sumaru	

=== Video games ===
Year	Title	Role	Ref.
2014	Granblue Fantasy	Milleore	
2014	Hyperdevotion Noire: Goddess Black Heart	Ein Al	
2014	Tokyo 7th Sisters	Alessandra Susu	
2015	Trillion: God of Destruction	Mammon	
2015	Under Night In-Birth Exe:Late[st]	Phonon	
2015	Nights of Azure	The First Saint	
2016	Gundam Breaker 3	Misora	
2016	Girls' Frontline	M14, Micro Uzi	
2016	Ys VIII: Lacrimosa of Dana	Dana Iclucia	
2017	School Girl/Zombie Hunter	Risa Kubota	
2018	Alice Gear Aegis	Virginia Glynnberets	
2018	Dead or Alive Xtreme Venus Vacation	Tamaki	
2018	Azur Lane	Maya	
2019	Our World is Ended	Natsumi Yuuki	
2019	WACCA	Elizabeth	
2019	Ash Arms	Flakpanzer IV Wirbelwind, Lancaster Mk.I	
2019	Exos Heroes	Rera	
2019	Ys IX: Monstrum Nox	Carla	
2020	Dead or Alive 6	Tamaki	
2020	Date A Live: Spirit Pledge	White Queen	
2021	Umamusume: Pretty Derby	Mejiro McQueen	
2021	Artery Gear: Fusion	Nina, Victoria	
2021	Counter:Side	Kang Soyoung, Ais Wallenstein	
2021	Gate of Nightmares	Lumina	
2021	Princess Connect! Re:Dive	Homare	
2022	Blue Archive	Sena Himuro	
2022	Granblue Fantasy	Mejiro McQueen	
2022	Shinobi Master Senran Kagura: New Link	Tamaki	
2022	Azure Striker Gunvolt 3	Sistina	
2022	Pokémon Masters EX	Sayoko	
2023	Azur Lane	Tamaki	
2023	Grisaia Chronos Rebellion	R	
2023	Master Detective Archives: Rain Code	Fubuki Clockford	
2023	Path to Nowhere	Oak Casket	
2023	Elrentaros Wanderings	Protagonist (female)	
2023	Honkai: Star Rail	Ruan Mei	
2024	Under Night In-Birth II [Sys:Celes]	Phonon	
2024	Umamusume: Pretty Derby – Party Dash	Mejiro McQueen	
2025	Venus Vacation Prism: Dead or Alive Xtreme	Tamaki	
2025	Azur Lane	Lion	
2025	Chaos Zero Nightmare	Rin	
2025	Octopath Traveler 0	Alaune Edoras	
2026	Zenless Zone Zero	Remielle	
2026	Dead or Alive 6 Last Round	Tamaki	

=== Radio ===
- Kakuma Ai & Onishi Saori no Can-chome Can-banchi - Niconico
- 7-Eleven presents Sakura toshitai Onishi - Nippon Cultural Broadcasting
- A&G TRIBAL RADIO AGSON - Nippon Cultural Broadcasting
- Takamina to Onishi no Takanishiya - Niconico

=== Dubbing ===
Live-action

- All of Us Are Dead (Min Eun-ji (Oh Hye-soo))

Animation

- The Loud House and The Casagrandes (Lynn Loud)
