= Ruan Mei =

Video game character

- Honkai character
- Official portrait
- First game: Honkai: Star Rail (2023)
- Voiced by: EN: Emi Lo; ZH: Zhang Wenyu; JA: Saori Ōnishi; KO: Yoon Yeo-jin

In-universe information
- Weapon: Ruan
- Home: Herta Space Station (Note: Herta Space Station is indicated as the world she is associated with on her character profile, but her actual planet of origin is not yet known.)
- Type: Ice
- Paths: Harmony (combat), Erudition (lore)

Ruan Mei (/rwɔːn meɪ/, Chinese: 阮·梅; pinyin: Ruǎn Méi) is a character from the video game Honkai: Star Rail, developed by miHoYo. In the game's lore, she is member #81 of the fictional organization known as the Genius Society. She became a playable character in version 1.6 of the game.

Ruan Mei's backstory revolves around her research into the essence of life, the Aeons, and divinity. In the storyline set on Herta Space Station, she drew divided reactions for creating a replica of the Emanator of Propagation, (Note: In the game, Emanators are characters who gain power from the Path they walk on and are able to draw extensively from the power of that Aeon's Path.) drugging the protagonist Trailblazer and concealing the risks of her experiment. Media discussion of Ruan Mei has focused on her cultural imagery, elegant appearance, and morally ambiguous characterization; she has also been the subject of museum collaborations and fan works. Her gameplay has generally been praised for its versatility as a team support character and in the "Simulated Universe" game mode.

== Design and voice acting ==
Ruan Mei is portrayed as a gentle and elegant scholar and researcher. Because of her talent and dedication, she drew the gaze of Nous, the Aeon of Erudition, and studies the origin of life. In private, she enjoys traditional Chinese opera and pastries, and is also interested in embroidery. She is voiced in English by Emi Lo, in Chinese by Zhang Wenyu, in Japanese by Saori Ōnishi, and in Korean by Yoon Yeo-jin.

== Appearances ==
=== Story ===
Ruan Mei was born into a family devoted to science. As a child, she traveled with her mother to different planets to investigate life, and through pastries, opera, and her relationships with her family, she developed an awareness of "love" and the differences between different forms of life. After her parents died, she reconstructed their appearances in the lab where she worked using data, gradually coming to disregard the established laws of life and the meaning of life itself. When she nearly disrupted the evolutionary laws of her homeworld's species, she drew the gaze of Nous, the Aeon of Erudition. She then left her homeworld and lived in seclusion to study the essence of life, creating fire, light, and lifeforms with consciousness and feelings. She also began to regard the Aeons as the central question at the endpoint of her research into life. She dreams of becoming an Aeon herself, though she regrets being unable to emotionally connect with her creations. She later became member #81 of the Genius Society, and Herta invited her to develop a project called the "Simulated Universe" together with fellow Geniuses. In that project, she was one of its co-founders; she had cultivated prototypes for the simulated Aeons and, together with Herta, connected the virtual Aeons to the real Paths. (Note: In Honkai: Star Rail's lore, Paths are manifestations of universal philosophical concepts. A person is considered to be "on" a Path when their will overlaps with the characteristics of that Path. For example, characters on the Path of Remembrance often have something to do with memory. Only certain Paths are available for use in combat; characters who use other Paths in the lore are assigned alternative Paths that they use in combat instead. A Path defines a character's combat role and design philosophy. Characters on the Path of Harmony typically focus on applying buffs to allies.)

In the Trailblaze Continuance Mission, "Crown of the Mundane and Divine", Ruan Mei visits Herta Space Station, borrows its Seclusion Zone for biological experiments, and obtains the Curio "Phase Flame" for research, cultivating multiple artificial lifeforms whose appearances resemble desserts. She investigates why Emanators are closer to Aeons than ordinary organisms, and therefore attempts to create a replica of the primitive Emanator of Propagation, Skaracabaz. However, the replica produced by the experiment is far weaker than the original, and can only survive for 56 seconds after leaving its culture medium.

To handle the runaway creations left behind by the experiment and to keep it confidential, Ruan Mei approaches the Trailblazer and tricks them into ingesting a serum via a pastry, making them unable to reveal information related to her. She then entrusts the protagonist with retrieving the lost artificial lifeforms. She later brings them to a meeting with Herta and fellow Genius Screwllum, and then sends them to the Seclusion Zone under a pretext. In reality, she has arranged for them to encounter the Skaracabaz replica. As the Trailblazer falls into a difficult battle, the replica self-destructs, just as she had expected.

Afterward, the Trailblazer questions her decision to use them as a variable in the experiment. Ruan Mei admits that she has grown tired of experiments with predetermined outcomes and wants to observe life through variables. She is also confused by the fact that she has developed emotions toward her artificial lifeforms, believing this to be far removed from the divinity she seeks. Before leaving, she tells the protagonist that the serum's effects will wear off soon, but that the related memories will also gradually fade. Despite the artificial lifeforms' attachment to her, Ruan Mei ultimately leaves the space station. After departing, she later sends the Trailblazer a text message about the condition of her creations, and thanks them after learning that they are doing well.

=== Gameplay ===
Ruan Mei is a five-star Ice character who follows the Path of Harmony, and fulfills a supporting role in combat. Her Skill increases the damage dealt by the entire team and improves the efficiency with which enemies' Weaknesses are broken. Weakness Break refers to using attacks of the corresponding type to reduce an enemy's Toughness; when Toughness is fully depleted, additional effects are triggered. Her ultimate allows allies to apply the "Thanatoplum Rebloom" effect to enemies after attacking them. When an enemy recovers from the Weakness Broken state, this effect prolongs the Weakness Broken state, delays the enemy's turn, and deals additional damage. Her Talent increases the Speed of all teammates except herself, and deals additional damage after an ally inflicts Weakness Break on an enemy.

== Promotion ==
Before Ruan Mei's release as a playable character, players could already encounter her through events related to her in the "Simulated Universe" gameplay mode. She had also appeared indirectly in an event in version 1.4. On December 22, 2023, miHoYo released her story teaser "Transcendent Ruan Tunes, Blushing Mei Blooms". Her character introduction revealed information about her in the form of an interview, while also showing her idle animation, Skill, and ultimate. On December 26, her character trailer was released, in which she speaks about pastries, fresh fruit, flowers, trees and the bearing of living things; this dialog was used to convey her character's temperament. She became playable on December 27, 2023, with the release of version 1.6. In April 2025, the game's anniversary event gave players an in-game item that could be used to redeem Ruan Mei for free if they wished. The company released a new outfit for her in version 4.0 in 2026.

In July 2024, miHoYo's Tmall flagship store began pre-sales for merchandise modeled after Ruan Mei's creations, including tissue boxes and cat beds. In September 2025, 4Gamer.net reported that ADK Emotions had announced that the first product in Myethos' stereoscopic model series, "Ruan Mei: Past Self in Mirror Ver." would be released in February 2026 and had opened for pre-orders. The product is based on Ruan Mei's illustration from her signature Light Cone, "Past Self in Mirror", and uses a multi-layer relief technique to create a three-dimensional effect. It can be displayed either as a desktop ornament or as wall decor. Additionally, MSI released a Ruan Mei-themed GeForce RTX 4090 SUPRIM X "Ruan Mei" Edition graphics card, featuring a green-and-gold cooling shroud and a character backplate design.

== Reception ==
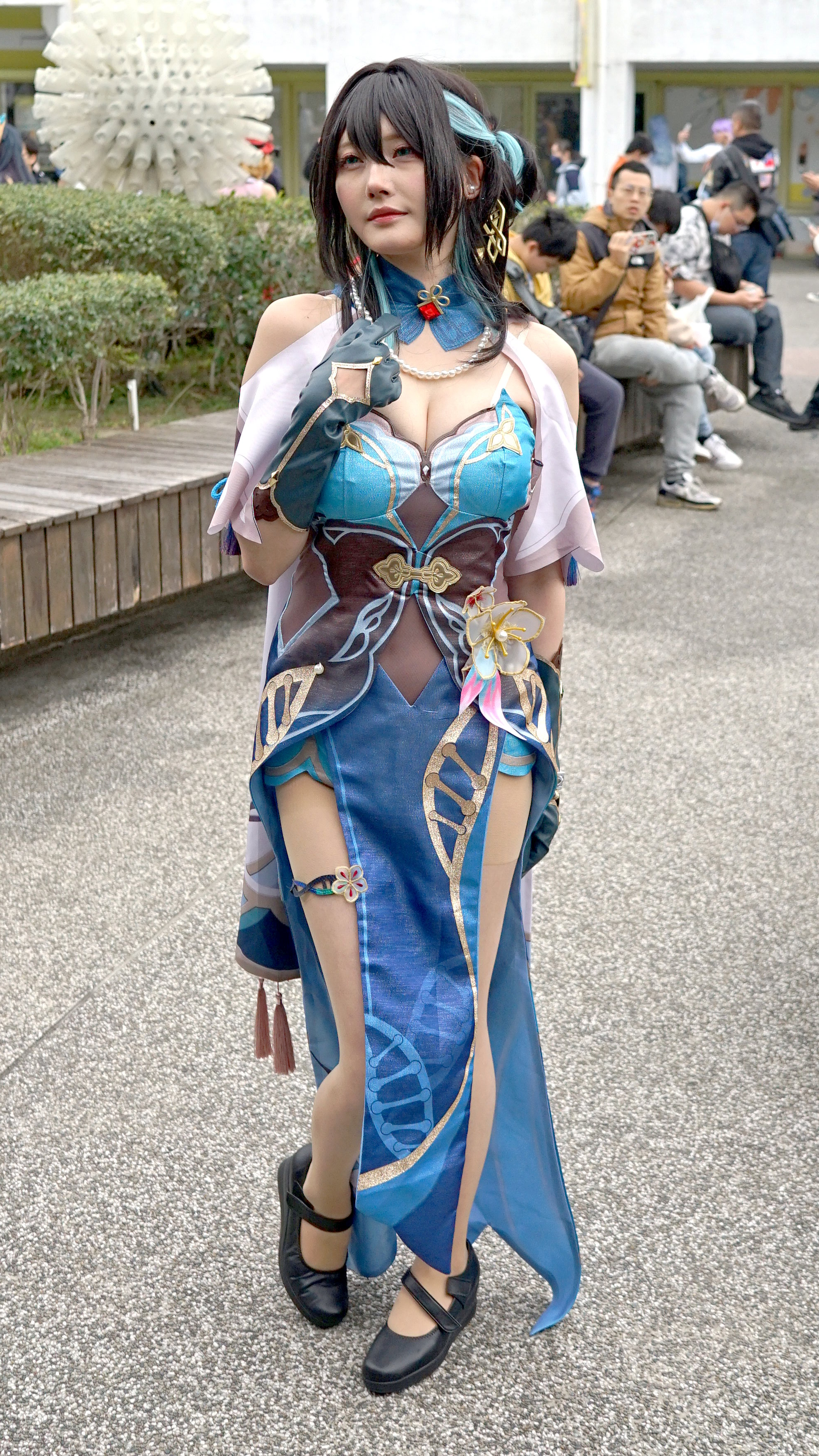
A cosplay of Ruan Mei

Ruan Mei was generally received well. According to Sina Esports, before she officially became a playable character, she had already accumulated considerable popularity because she appeared in the "Simulated Universe" game mode through a reward event bearing her name. Chinese-speaking players jokingly referred to encountering this event as "eating [Ruan Mei's] food" (吃阮饭; chī ruǎn fàn), which is a play on the words for "eating soft food" (吃软饭; chī ruǎn fàn). According to the report, after the promotional livestream for version 1.6, analysis, lore research, and character-building content related to Ruan Mei took up a large amount of space in the community, making her a focus of attention for fans of the game. Fans expressed their love for her through fan art, 3D character cards, cosplay and other creations. In July 2024, designer Liu Haixie shared the process of creating Ruan Mei fan art using tools such as the iPad Pro and Procreate at Apple's "Made on iPad" event at the Shanghai Art Tower. Apple CEO Tim Cook posted in praise of the work on Weibo. According to Tencent News, some players shared a senior high school chemistry exam question that placed Ruan Mei's name and character art into a multiple-choice question, prompting discussion among players about her identity as a life scientist and the chemical formulas that appear in her character effects.

Regarding her design, Siliconera editor Jenni Lada believed that Ruan Mei's outfit distinguishes her from the sense of similarity often found among miHoYo characters with the same body type through elements such as ribbons and draped shawls. She felt that the overall style was elegant and did not make her feel exactly the same as other characters. According to Siliconera writer Stephanie Liu, before the character was officially released, some users on the Chinese forum NGA said they wanted to report Ruan Mei because of her exposed navel and black sheer fabric design, comparing the incident to previous outfit adjustments made to some of the characters in one of miHoYo's other games, Genshin Impact. Liu believed that Ruan Mei's story teaser primarily presented her past, why she chose life science, and her contributions to the Simulated Universe. The video, she says, also used vivid colors to express her perspective of observing the beauty of the everyday world. Tencent News said that in her character trailer she recites lines from a lyric poem by Song dynasty poet Li Qingzhao. The article also linked the name of her Character Warp name "Floral Triptych" to the plum blossom imagery in a poem by Lin Bu as well as the guqin piece "Three Variations on Yangguan" and the relationship between the ruan and pipa as musical instruments.

Lada considers Ruan Mei as one of the morally-ambiguous playable characters in the game. When Ruan Mei first meets the Trailblazer she appears gentle, but it is quickly revealed that she had drugged them via food and forcibly involved them in her research. As events progress, Ruan Mei is further presented as a Genius Society member who is obsessed with creating life, abandons her own creations, and conceals her actions. Lada said that Ruan Mei's attempt to recreate a replica of Skaracabaz, an Emanator of Propagation, brings her dangerousness to its peak. Ruan Mei's later explanation of her experiment remains ambiguous, making her unlike a typical good-aligned character; however, this design instead prevents the playable cast from consisting of entirely that type of character. Sina Esports, discussing her character setup, argued that before version 1.6, players' impression of Ruan Mei mainly came from fragmented information such as events and character dialog, as well as an appearance that combined Eastern elements with biological science elements. Once the story progressed, players gradually saw her pursuit of the essence of life and her attempt to scientifically recreate the form and power of an Aeon, all while dealing with the trouble she had caused. The article argued that Ruan Mei constructs life with absolute rationality but ignores emotion as a defining feature of life, creating a contrast between the earlier foreshadowing and the later story, and making her characterization more three-dimensional.

Her gameplay also received positive reviews. Screen Rant writer Bruno Yonezawa and Polygon writer Julia Lee both regarded Ruan Mei as a more universally useful choice than Luocha. Dengeki Online writer Cestus Harakawa, Liu, and Yahoo News writer Yan Ku all believed that Ruan Mei combines offensive support, Weakness Break support, and Speed support, giving her almost all the support elements needed on offense. Cestus Harakawa wrote that the Weakness Break efficiency provided by her Skill can be used either to prevent powerful attacks from boss enemies or to speed up battles against ordinary ones, while her ultimate's effects of delaying enemy actions and dealing additional damage are especially effective in long, high-difficulty battles. Ku praised Ruan Mei because her buffs cover the entire team, allowing her to support dual-DPS teams rather than serving only as a single main damage dealer. Liu praised Ruan Mei for being usable alongside most Harmony or Nihility characters. In terms of gameplay, she described Ruan Mei as a character who can improve the experience of high-difficulty content; her teamwide buffs, relatively low Skill Point pressure, and adaptability to certain teams allowed her to remain useful across multiple version environments. Lada also called Ruan Mei a highly versatile character who can fit into many kinds of teams. She said that Ruan Mei only needs to consume one Skill Point every three turns to maintain her buff, while simultaneously increasing team damage and Weakness Break efficiency; her ultimate and Talent further improve the team's damage output, Speed, and crowd-control ability. Cestus Harakawa also mentioned that aside from her support in ordinary combat, Ruan Mei can also improve the efficiency of progressing through the Simulated Universe game mode (a major advantage) and said that in terms of improving progression efficiency, this could be considered a privilege unique to her.
