= Secrets of the Silent Witch =

Japanese light novel series

- First light novel volume cover

サイレント・ウィッチ 沈黙の魔女の隠しごと (Sairento Witchi: Chinmoku no Majo no Kakushigoto)
- Genre: Adventure; Fantasy comedy; Sword and sorcery
- Novel series
- Written by: Matsuri Isora
- Published by: Shōsetsuka ni Narō
- Original run: February 20, 2020 – October 3, 2020
- Novel series

Spin-off
- Written by: Matsuri Isora
- Published by: Shōsetsuka ni Narō
- Original run: November 14, 2020 – August 13, 2024
- Light novel
- Written by: Matsuri Isora
- Illustrated by: Nanna Fujimi
- Published by: Fujimi Shobo
- English publisher: NA: Yen Press
- Imprint: Kadokawa Books
- Original run: June 10, 2021 – present
- Volumes: 12 + 2
- Manga
- Written by: Matsuri Isora
- Illustrated by: Tobi Tana
- Published by: Enterbrain
- English publisher: NA: Yen Press
- Magazine: B's Log Comic
- Original run: July 5, 2021 – present
- Volumes: 7
- Light novel

-another- Rising of the Barrier Mage
- Written by: Matsuri Isora
- Illustrated by: Nanna Fujimi
- Published by: Fujimi Shobo
- English publisher: NA: Yen Press
- Imprint: Kadokawa Books
- Original run: December 8, 2023 – April 10, 2024
- Volumes: 2
- Manga

-another- Rising of the Barrier Mage
- Written by: Matsuri Isora
- Illustrated by: Azu Azuko
- Published by: Kadokawa Shoten
- Magazine: KadoComi
- Original run: January 9, 2025 – present
- Volumes: 1
- Anime television series
- Directed by: Takaomi Kanasaki (Note: Credited as Chief Director (総監督, Sō Kantoku)); Yasuo Iwamoto
- Written by: Takaomi Kanasaki
- Music by: Cygames; Rina Tayama
- Studio: Studio Gokumi
- Licensed by: Crunchyroll; SEA: Plus Media Networks Asia
- Original network: Tokyo MX, GYT, GTV, BS11, ytv, TV Aichi, AT-X
- Original run: July 5, 2025 – October 5, 2025
- Episodes: 13
- icon

Secrets of the Silent Witch (Japanese: サイレント・ウィッチ 沈黙の魔女の隠しごと, Hepburn: Sairento Witchi: Chinmoku no Majo no Kakushigoto) is a Japanese light novel series written by Matsuri Isora and illustrated by Nanna Fujimi. It was initially serialized on the user-generated novel publishing website Shōsetsuka ni Narō from February to October 2020. It was later acquired by Fujimi Shobo who began to publish it under their Kadokawa Books imprint in June 2021. A manga adaptation illustrated by Tobi Tana began serialization on Enterbrain's josei manga magazine B's Log Comic manga website in July 2021. An anime television series adaptation produced by Studio Gokumi aired from July to October 2025.

== Plot ==
Monica Everett is a young mage who suffers from intense social anxiety. A child prodigy, she became the youngest person to be appointed to the Seven Sages, the most powerful mages in the Kingdom of Ridill, at the age of 15. This was due to her development of unchanted spellcasting, an unprecedented skill among mages and a coping mechanism she devised for her anxious personality.

Everett is eventually forced to abandon her reclusive lifestyle when she is entrusted a mission to infiltrate Serendia Academy, a preparatory school for nobles, and guard Felix Arc Ridill, the second prince of the kingdom. The series follows Everett's life as she carries out her mission and confronts her social anxiety to do so.

== Characters ==
=== Main characters ===
Monica Everett (モニカ・エヴァレット, Monika Evaretto)
Voiced by: Saya Aizawa (Japanese); Alejandra Reynoso (English)
A kind but very timid 16-year-old girl and the youngest of the Seven Sages, the most powerful mages in the Kingdom of Ridill. Due to her social anxiety, she ended up learning Unchanted Magecraft, the only one to do so in the history of the kingdom, during her time at Minerva's Mage Training Institution. She soon joined the Sages and came to be called the "Silent Witch" (沈黙の魔女, Chinmoku no Majo). Her popularity rose after she single-handedly defeated the Black Dragon of Worgan. Despite this, Monica continues to live as a shut-in at her mountain cabin until Louis Miller the Barrier Mage, a fellow Sage, pays her a visit with a particular mission. Louis forces her to enroll at Serendia Academy's Advanced Course under the false identity of second-year student Monica Norton, a commoner adopted into a noble family, in order to guard the second prince of the kingdom in his stead. Monica is made the Accountant of Serendia Academy's Student Council following a series of events soon after her arrival there. Owing to this and her making some new friends at the school, Monica decides to improve herself and begins working to overcome her social anxiety. She also owns a coffeepot that belonged to her late father and considers it to be her treasure. Thanks to her position as a Sage, Monica is officially recognized as a noble with the special rank "count of magic", which is equivalent in status to that of a normal count. She is unaware of Felix's crush on her, and his affectionate attitude often makes her uncomfortable.
Nero (ネロ)
Voiced by: Hitomi Nabatame (cat), Shun'ichi Toki (human) (Japanese); Gabby Dahlen (cat), Skyler Brigmann (human) (English)
Monica's black cat familiar who is capable of human speech. He is also capable of transforming into a human form, usually assuming the guise of a young man in his twenties. He is an avid reader of fiction and a glutton for meat, especially chicken. His true identity and nature are unknown to all but Monica.
Louis Miller (ルイス・ミラー, Ruisu Mirā)
Voiced by: Junichi Suwabe (Japanese); Ben Stillwell (English)
A member of the Seven Sages named the Barrier Mage thanks to mastery of Defensive Magecraft. He has a nasty personality but maintains a gentlemanly front, and has stated that he enjoys bullying the strong as opposed to picking on the weak. He receives a covert order from the King of Ridill to guard the second prince, Felix, despite being part of the first prince's faction. He forces Monica to take his place as the prince's bodyguard after the latter thwarts his attempt to keep him under surveillance with a magic item (in reality, he actually wants Monica to get out of her shell & have real friends). He is married to his long-time sweetheart Rosalie, a doctor, and they are expecting their first child, making him a "very happy feller".
Rynzbelfeid (リィンズベルフィード, Rīnzberufīdo)
Voiced by: M.A.O (Japanese); Brenna Larsen (English)
Nicknamed Ryn, she is a High Wind Spirit contracted to Louis as his familiar. She usually takes the form of a beautiful woman in a maid's dress. Though their relationship is that of master-servant, Ryn takes every chance she gets to badmouth Louis for his somewhat nasty personality. As typical of spirits, she does not understand human emotions and always speaks in a monotone. She is capable of transforming into a small yellow bird. Thanks to her nature as a spirit, she is adept at Flight Magecraft and has excellent hearing. She is usually the main point of contact between her master and Monica while the latter is on her mission at Serendia Academy.
Isabelle Norton (イザベル・ノートン, Izaberu Nōton)
Voiced by: Atsumi Tanezaki (Japanese); Kayli Mills (English)
The daughter of Count Kerbeck, an influential eastern noble, and a first-year student of the Advanced Course at Serendia Academy. She agrees to cooperate in the mission to guard the second prince and acts as Monica's "villainous" niece who abuses her to make the latter's cover story more convincing. In reality, she adores Monica, doting on the Sage and even addressing her as "dear sister" whenever they meet in private. This is thanks to Monica saving the lands of her father and the lives of his subjects when she defeated the Black Dragon of Worgan. She is very adept at collecting information and has a lot of connections in high society. Isabelle and her family are avid fans of villainous characters in fiction, and are always ready to lend their expertise in "villainy" to Monica for her mission.

=== Serendia Academy Student Council ===
Felix Arc Ridill (フェリクス・アーク・リディル, Ferikusu Āku Ridiru)
Voiced by: Shogo Sakata (Japanese); Harrison Xu (English)
The second prince of the Kingdom of Ridill, whom Monica is tasked to protect. He is a third-year student of the Advanced Course and is also the Student Council President. He has a secret familiar named Wildianu, nicknamed Wil, who is a High Water Spirit. He develops a crush on Monica later on, despite not knowing her true reason of enrolling at the academy.
Cyril Ashley (シリル・アシュリー, Shiriru Ashurī)
Voiced by: Yoshiki Nakajima (Japanese); Kellen Goff (English)
The Student Council Vice President and a close companion of Prince Felix, Cyril is known for his friendly and perceptive nature. Though his words can sometimes be blunt or harsh, they stem from genuine concern for those he cares about. He quickly befriends Monica Everett, unaware of her secret identity, and later develops quiet feelings for her. His loyalty to Felix and his empathy toward his friends make him a grounding presence within the group.
Elliott Howard (エリオット・ハワード, Eriotto Hawādo)
Voiced by: Ryōhei Kimura (Japanese); Cullen McCarthy (English)
A third-year student of the Advanced Course and one of the Student Council Secretaries. He is the son of Count Dasvy, and has known Prince Felix since their childhood days. He has a deep-rooted belief in the class system thanks to an event concerning his uncle and a commoner. He believes commoners and nobles should know their place. Due to this, Elliot is very caustic when interacting with Cyril, and later Monica. Despite this, he does not look down on either and is quite honourable when it comes to his duties as a noble. He even eventually warms up to Cyril and Monica, though he has trouble admitting it openly. He is skilled at chess and violin. Elliot is not a morning person and also dislikes rainy days.
Neil Clay Maywood (ニール・クレイ・メイウッド, Nīru Kurei Meiuddo)
Voiced by: Yuki Sakakihara (Japanese); Jesse Vilinsky (English)
A second-year student of the Advanced Course and Officer of General Affairs. Besides Monica, he is the only other second-year student in the council. He is mild-mannered and easily approachable. He is also a brilliant negotiator and is part of the Lineage of Negotiators. Though the Maywoods are only barons, they are well-regarded in noble circles thanks to this. He is the fiancé of Claudia Ashley, Cyril's foster sister. While he is polite and affable most of the time, he can become assertive when it concerns his fiancée.
Bridget Greyham (ブリジット・グレイアム, Burijitto Gureiamu)
Voiced by: Yoko Hikasa (Japanese); Brenna Larsen (English)

=== Other students ===
Lana Colette (ラナ・コレット, Rana Koretto)
Voiced by: Kanna Nakamura (Japanese); Xanthe Huynh (English)
A second-year student of the Advanced Course and Monica's first friend at the school. She is interested in fashion and always keeps up to date with the trends. She is the daughter of Baron Colette, who is a wealthy merchant. Her classmates call her "nouveau riche" to mock her since her family became nobility thanks to their wealth. Thanks to her mercantile background, she has an eye for trade and is also good at arithmetic. A kind girl at heart, she considers Monica to be her best friend and is always willing to help her out despite being none the wiser of her friend's true identity or her mission at the academy.
Casey Grove (ケイシー・グローヴ, Keishī Gurōvu)
Voiced by: Hina Suguta (Japanese); Frankie Kevich (English)
A second-year student of the Advanced Course and a noble from the countryside. She saves Monica from a runaway carriage during an attempted theft at school, and the two quickly grow close after she offers to teach her horse riding. She is also skilled at embroidery. It is later revealed that her friendship with Monica was a front for a plot to assassinate Felix, driven by fear that if he ascended the throne, his backer would provoke a war against a nation that once protected her homeland from dragons. After her arrest, she breaks down upon seeing Monica cry for her, insisting Monica shouldn't shed tears for a criminal like her and wishing she could have truly taught her horse riding and embroidery, showing she was never malicious at heart. She avoids the death penalty thanks to Monica's pleas. She also discovers Monica's true identity but never exposes it.
Claudia Ashley (クローディア・アシュリー, Kurōdia Ashurī)
Voiced by: Ai Kayano (Japanese); Ryan Bartley (English)
Cyril's foster sister and a second-year student of the Advanced Course. Being the daughter of Marquess Highown, she is part of the Lineage of the Wise, the foremost knowledge keepers in the Kingdom of Ridill. She always has an air of gloominess around her and hates being depended on by others. She takes an interest in Monica after their tea party practical with Lana and Casey. She is also Neil's fiancée and is very possessive of him. She is considered one of Serendia Academy's 'Three Beauties'.

=== Minerva Academy ===
Bernie Jones (バーニー・ジョーンズ, Bānī jōnzu)
Voiced by: Akeno Watanabe (Japanese); Jadon Sand (English)
A top student at Minerva Academy who hopes to become one of the Seven Sages. He was Monica's first true friend, saving her from bullies and helping her keep up with classes. When Monica finally became one of the Seven Sages, she rushed to show him, wanting him to be proud and hoping he could rely on her for once instead of the other way around. Instead, he was overwhelmed by jealousy and cast her aside, leaving her with deep emotional trauma. Bernie later reappears during the Chess Tournament and soon figures out who Monica really is. After Lana defends her, he confronts his insecurity and admits to himself that he had always known she was exceptionally talented. When he exposes an assassin posing as a teacher and is nearly killed for it, Monica saves him, and he protects her identity in return.

=== The Seven Sages ===
Mary Harvey (メアリー・ハーベイ, Mearī hābei)
Voiced by: Mamiko Noto (Japanese)
Known as "The Starseer Witch", a very beautiful and kind woman who can prophesize the future. She is thought to be the oldest of the Seven Sages, and the de facto leader at meetings. She is quite fond of Monica.

== Media ==
=== Light novel ===
Written by Matsuri Isora, Secrets of the Silent Witch was initially serialized on the user-generated novel publishing website Shōsetsuka ni Narō from February 20 to October 3, 2020. It was later acquired by Fujimi Shobo who began releasing the series with illustrations by Nanna Fujimi under their Kadokawa Books imprint on June 10, 2021. Twelve volumes and two short story volumes have been released as of June 2026. On January 28, 2022, Yen Press announced that they licensed the series for English publication.

A two-volume prequel light novel series, titled Silent Witch -another- Rising of the Barrier Mage, was published under the same imprint from December 8, 2023, to April 10, 2024. On December 16, 2024, Yen Press announced that they also licensed the prequel for English publication.

==== Volumes ====
No.	Original release date	Original ISBN	North American release date	North American ISBN
1	June 10, 2021	978-4-04-074035-5	August 23, 2022	978-1-9753-4780-2
Prologue: The Black Dragon of Worgan; Chapter 1: A Colleague Arrives and Acts Unreasonably; Chapter 2: The Villainess Is Fond of the Silent Witch; Chapter 3: How Quickly the Headmaster Rubs His Hands; Chapter 4: The Greatest of Trials (Self-Introductions); Chapter 5: The Silent Witch Speaks Fervently on the Golden Ratio; Chapter 6: Rolling Witch; Chapter 7: The Second Prince's Secret; Chapter 8: Eyelash Mechanics; Chapter 9: A Midnight Visitor and a Happy Feller; Chapter 10: The Perfect Formula; Epilogue: The Little Hand in His Memories; Secret Episode: Report of the Silent Witch
2	October 8, 2021	978-4-04-074224-3	November 22, 2022	978-1-9753-4782-6
Prologue: A Little Weekend Challenge; Chapter 1: The Silent Witch, or the Misspeaking Witch; Chapter 2: The Terrifying Mana Capacity Gauge; Chapter 3: The Bull with No Tail, the Cheerful Noble Girl, and the Cat Who Wore a Skirt; Chapter 4: Round and Round; Chapter 5: It's Mostly Thanks to the Gemsmith; Chapter 6: A Cup out of Place; Chapter 7: The Dream the Bitter Tea Showed; Chapter 8: The Star Villainess's High-Pitched Laugh; Chapter 9: The Circumstances of Chocolate; Chapter 10: A Blissful Promise; Chapter 11: My Responsibility; Epilogue: A Soft Wall; Secret Episode: It Was Like Love...
3	February 10, 2022	978-4-04-074375-2	March 21, 2023	978-1-9753-5169-4
Prologue: Bernie Jones and Everett the Mute; Chapter 1: I Don't Need a Reason; Chapter 2: Upstart; Chapter 3: A Love Triangle Is a Thing of Beauty; Chapter 4: My Friend; Chapter 5: Disguised Malice; Chapter 6: To Engrave My Name in History; Chapter 7: The Starseer Witch Mary Harvey's Heart-Pounding Reading; Chapter 8: Monica Becomes a Delinquent; Chapter 9: A Kind Ghost; Chapter 10: A Little Squirrel Soaring Through the Night Sky; Chapter 11: A Book's Worth; Epilogue: Always Put a Ribbon on Your Kitten; Secret Episode: In the North
4	August 10, 2022	978-4-04-074626-5	July 25, 2023	978-1-9753-7007-7
Prologue: The Girl Who Fled Into a World of Numbers; Chapter 1: My Prince; Chapter 2: The Purple One Who Desires Love; Chapter 3: That's Why You'll Always Be My Rival; Chapter 4: A Dazzling Family of Villains; Chapter 5: Stand-In for a Hero; Chapter 6: Bluish-Gray Fouled by Crimson; Chapter 7: He Sends an Invitation Every Year; Chapter 8: Heartless Witch; Chapter 9: Drawer Full of Treasures; Chapter 10: I Am Yours; Chapter 11: More than Equations or Magic Formulae...; Epilogue: The Happiness of the Hero Who Became a Star; Secret Episode: The Traitorous Shaman's Whereabouts
4.5	October 7, 2022	978-4-04-074629-6	April 16, 2024	978-1-9753-9368-7
Prologue: The Seven Sages and the Library's Secret; Intermission: May the Morning Dew Bring You Good Fortune; Case I: The Black Cat Detective's Stray Reasoning: ~The Delinquents' Secret Book-Reading Mission~; Intermission: The First-Love Thief and I; Case II: The Struggle of the Icy Scion and the Butcher's Son: ~The Meat Thief and the Lost Girl~; Intermission: The Power to Oppose Injustice; Case III: The Cynic's Melancholy: ~The Musician Playboy and Rumors about the Old Dorm~; Intermission: Violin on a Clear Day; Case IV: The Villainess's Secret Maneuvers: ~The Charmed Dream~; Intermission: Meeting of the Dazzling Family of Villains; Epilogue: The Silent Witch's Little Mystery; Secret Episode: With Thanks from the Silent Witch
5	February 10, 2023	978-4-04-074628-9	October 15, 2024	978-1-9753-9044-0
Prologue: The Game Starts Before You Even Get to the Table, My Fellow Sage; Chapter 1: The Winter Market and Alteria Chimes; Chapter 2: The Great Witch Descendeth in Shining Wind; Chapter 3: The Whereabouts of Secret Recipe Number Three; Chapter 4: Bartholomeus Baal's Proposition; Chapter 5: Meat-Eaters Talk About Meat; Chapter 6: Cursed; Chapter 7: What the Puppet Felt on the Brink of Death; Chapter 8: Looking for Love at the Rehnberg Estate; Chapter 9: How Monica and Nero Met; Chapter 10: Venedict Reyn's Acquantaince; Chapter 11: Homecoming; Epilogue: An Oath on a Tone; Secret Episode: A Few Things Unbeknownst to the Silent Witch
6	August 10, 2023	978-4-04-075090-3	May 20, 2025	978-1-9753-9266-6
Prologue: The Dazzling Family of Villains' Pre-Solstice Show; Chapter 1: The Three Young Sages Assemble; Chapter 2: I Only Have One Thing to Say; Chapter 3: A Letter from Bernie Jones; Chapter 4: Fateful Transfer Students; Chapter 5: Third Prince Albert's Big Plan to Make Friends; Chapter 6: The Kidnapping of Monica Norton; Chapter 7: Duel and Hunt; Chapter 8: Thump!; Chapter 9: A Distressing Invitation from a Midnight Visitor; Chapter 10: An Offering to a Spirit; Chapter 11: Men Passing Through; Epilogue: Obstructing Winds; Secret Episode: Starseer and Starspear
7	February 9, 2024	978-4-04-075093-4; 978-4-04-075345-4 (SE)	December 2, 2025	979-8-8554-0703-7
Prologue: The Silent Witch Buys Some Time; Chapter 1: A Man with No Pride, but a Stubborn Streak; Chapter 2: Descendant of the Wicked Witch; Chapter 3: A Genius's Aesthetic and the Value of a One-of-a-Kind Talent; Chapter 4: The Winter Spirit's Lullaby; Chapter 5: Pauloshmer's Mirror of Execution; Chapter 6: The Flute's True Desire; Chapter 7: I Offer Vestiges of Autumn; Chapter 8: Those Beginning to Act; Chapter 9: Memories of a Gentle Prince and a Blue Rose; Chapter 10: A Return to Daily Life as Rumors Spread; Chapter 11: An Exchange of Dazzling Smiles; Chapter 12: A Beginner Lost in a Maze of Love; Chapter 13: His Attendant's Name; Epilogue: From the Silent Witch to the Clay Man; Secret Episode: Wish of the Starseer Witch
8	August 9, 2024	978-4-04-075563-2	September 22, 2026	979-8-8554-2198-9
Prologue: Smuggled Out; Chapter 1: Vikeli'ywon; Chapter 2: The Black Lion's Invitation; Chapter 3: The Truth of the Black Grail; Chapter 4: Secret Friends; Chapter 5: A Necessary Wound; Chapter 6: His Coffin; Chapter 7: The Miracle Witch; Chapter 8: A Pawn off the Board; Chapter 9: The Ghost of Conviction Stands Motionless; Chapter 10: Thus Spake the Observer; Chapter 11: Reunion in a Northern Land; Chapter 12: Proof My Father Lived; Chapter 13: A Feeling the Water Spirit Can't Name; Epilogue: The Silent Witch; Secret Episode: Where the Stars Lead
9	February 10, 2025	978-4-04-075813-8; 978-4-04-075814-5 (SE)	—	—
9.5	June 10, 2025	978-4-04-075854-1	—	—
10	July 10, 2025	978-4-04-075855-8	—	—
11	January 9, 2026	978-4-04-076249-4	—	—
12	June 10, 2026	978-4-04-076438-2	—	—
13	November 10, 2026	978-4-04-076620-1	—	—

==== -another- Rising of the Barrier Mage ====
No.	Original release date	Original ISBN	North American release date	North American ISBN
1	December 8, 2023	978-4-04-075207-5	June 10, 2025	979-8-8554-0873-7
Prologue: Mirror Prison; Chapter 1: So Much to Discover: Family, the Whole World, and New Flavors of Jam; Chapter 2: The Dormitory Jam Hunt Incident; Chapter 3: An Interesting Girl and Louis's First Souvenir; Chapter 4: A Problem Child's Surefire Strategy for Winning Magic Battles; Chapter 5: The Grotto Mage; Chapter 6: The Problem Child Learns the Weight of Responsibility; Chapter 7: The Barrier Witch; Chapter 8: A Busy School Festival; Chapter 9: The Problem Child and the Golden Gorilla; Chapter 10: The Problem Child's Alcohol War; Chapter 11: The Inter-Laboratory Magic Battle Competition; Chapter 12: Burdens and Resolutions; Chapter 13: The Problem Child Graduates; Epilogue: His First Dragon Hunt; Secret Episode: Conspiracies Beneath the Surface
2	April 10, 2024	978-4-04-075208-2	February 10, 2026	979-8-8554-1249-9
Prologue: The Barrier Mage; Chapter 1: The Novice Gentleman's Ballroom Debut; Chapter 2: The Former Problem Child Takes on an Apprentice; Chapter 3: Long-Awaited Reunion; Chapter 4: Candidates Assembled; Chapter 5: What Was Lost and What Was Kept; Chapter 6: Peace Must Be Won, Held, and Protected; Chapter 7: The Former Problem Child Meets a Rare Animal; Chapter 8: A True Monster; Chapter 9: The Empty Glass Castle and the Healthy Witch; Chapter 10: Burdens and Choices; Chapter 11: The New Sages; Epilogue: Alone with You, with Nothing Around; Secret Episode: Daily Life of the Seven Sages

=== Manga ===
A manga adaptation illustrated by Tobi Tana began serialization on Enterbrain's B's Log Comic manga website on July 5, 2021. The manga's chapters have been compiled into seven tankōbon volumes as of September 2026. On January 13, 2023, Yen Press announced that they also licensed the manga for English publication.

A manga adaptation of the prequel novels, illustrated by Azu Azuko, began serialization on Kadokawa Corporation's KadoComi website on January 9, 2025. The prequel manga's chapters have been compiled into a single tankōbon volume as of September 2025.

==== Volumes ====
No.	Original release date	Original ISBN	North American release date	North American ISBN
1	April 1, 2022	978-4-04-736981-8	July 18, 2023	978-1-9753-6530-1
Prologue; Chapters 1–4
2	December 1, 2022	978-4-04-737274-0	December 12, 2023	978-1-9753-7694-9
Chapters 5–8; Side Stories
3	August 1, 2023	978-4-04-737540-6	September 17, 2024	978-1-9753-9274-1
Chapters 9–13; The Student Council Room-Wreckers
4	May 31, 2024	978-4-04-738003-5	July 22, 2025	979-8-8554-1339-7
Chapters 14–17; The Smallest Perfect Number
5	January 31, 2025	978-4-04-738326-5	March 24, 2026	979-8-8554-2612-0
Chapters 18–21; Squiggly Chocolate Dream
6	September 1, 2025	978-4-04-738581-8	March 23, 2027	979-8-8554-3992-2
7	September 1, 2026	978-4-04-500242-7	—	—

==== -another- Rising of the Barrier Mage ====
No.	Original release date	Original ISBN	North American release date	North American ISBN
1	September 5, 2025	978-4-04-811618-3	—	—

=== Anime ===
An anime adaptation was announced at the Aniplex × Kadokawa Anime Matsuri livestream event on August 2, 2024, which was later confirmed to be a television series produced by Studio Gokumi and directed by Yasuo Iwamoto, with Takaomi Kanasaki serving as chief director and handling series composition and episode screenplays, Cona Nitanda designing the characters, and Cygames and Rina Tayama composing the music. The series aired from July 5 to October 5, 2025, on Tokyo MX and other networks. (Note: Tokyo MX lists the series premiere on July 4, 2025, at 24:00, which is effectively July 5 at midnight JST.) The opening theme song is "Feel", while the ending theme song is "mild days", both performed by Hitsujibungaku. Crunchyroll is streaming the series. Plus Media Networks Asia licensed the series in Southeast Asia and broadcasts it on Aniplus Asia.

==== Episodes ====
No.	Title	Directed by	Storyboarded by	Original release date
1	"A Colleague Arrives and Acts Unreasonably"; Transliteration: "Dōki ga Ki Tarite Mucha o Iu" (Japanese: 同期が来たりて無茶を言う)	Yasuo Iwamoto	Takaomi Kanasaki	July 5, 2025
The Kingdom of Ridill is attacked by a horde of pterodragons led by the Black Dragon of Worgan. The black dragon is slain by Monica Everett, known as the Silent Witch of the Seven Sages due to her ability to cast spells without an incantation, which she learned because of her shyness and anxiety. Three months later, Monica is approached by Louis Miller, another one of the Seven Sages, and his familiar Rynzbelfeid having been given a secret order from the king to protect the second prince Felix Arc Ridill. Louis requests Monica to attend Serendia Academy as an undercover student to protect Felix and after pressuring her, Monica reluctantly accepts. The next day, Monica, along with her black cat familiar Nero, visits Louis' house and is introduced to Isabelle Norton, Count Kerbeck's daughter whose land Monica saved from the black dragon. Isabelle expresses her gratitude after initially acting villainously towards Monica as part of her role as an entitled countess with Monica as her maid.
2	"Taking a Step Forward"; Transliteration: "Ippo o Fumidasu" (Japanese: 一歩を踏み出す)	Shinsuke Gomi	Takaomi Kanasaki	July 12, 2025
Monica attends her first day at Serendia Academy but makes a poor first impression due to her shyness. One of her classmates, Lana Colette, then approaches Monica and helps redo her hair into a more fashionable style before taking her leave. Monica then searches for a private spot she can be alone in, and encounters Felix by chance. After instinctively saving Felix from a falling flower pot, she faints from fright from being in close contact with him. That night, Monica believes she has failed her mission, but a flashback to her father teaching her how challenges can be fun convinces her to give it another try. She approaches Lana and manages to befriend her before being summoned by Felix. He explains to Monica that ever since the student council treasurer, Aaron O'Brien, was detained for embezzling funds, a series of mysterious accidents threatening Felix's life began to occur. Felix reveals that he suspects Monica might be Aaron's accomplice, and tells her the only way she can prove her innocence is to find the real accomplice.
3	"Serendia Academy Student Council"; Transliteration: "Serendia Gakuen Seitokai" (Japanese: セレンディア学園生徒会)	Hodaka Kuramoto	Takaomi Kanasaki	July 19, 2025
The next day, Monica and Lana stumble upon Aaron's fiancé Selma Karsh, who is being bullied by Count Norn's daughter Caroline Simmons in the stairwell. Caroline carelessly pushes Monica down the stairs and into the student council vice president Cyril Ashley, but Monica refuses to tell him what happened due to believing he would side with Caroline. Monica later begins her search for the accomplice and examines the balcony outside the music room where the flowerpot was dropped, figuring out that Selma is the accomplice based on a pair of dirty gloves she left behind and the records of who used the music room. Selma confesses that everything was her doing to protect Aaron, who she claims was just following her instructions. Selma and Aaron agree to withdraw from school and Felix forgives them. Afterwards, Felix appoints Monica to replace Aaron as the student council treasurer, causing Monica to have a nervous breakdown. The next day, Cyril trains Monica for the position and having seen her capabilities, tells Monica to have more confidence in herself. He also informs her that he had investigated the incident with Caroline and punished her accordingly, which surprises Monica.
4	"The Perfect Formula"; Transliteration: "Kanpekina Shiki" (Japanese: 完璧な式)	Tomoe Makino	Takaomi Kanasaki	July 26, 2025
Rynzbelfeid visits Monica for her progress report to Louis when she detects excessive mana from Cyril. Realizing Cyril suffers from "Mana Hyper Absorption", and the brooch he normally uses to expel it is malfunctioning, Monica fights him in disguise and forces him to use it all up, rendering him unconscious, before fixing the item. Concluding that Ciril's condition was the result of brainwashing, Monica confronts student council advisor Victor Thornlee, whom she deduces is the mastermind behind the embezzlement through her work in correcting falsified records. Thornlee attempts to brainwash Monica, but she turns his own spell on him, knocking him out, after which Louis arrests him. Meanwhile, Felix's familiar, Wildianu, reports to him regarding Cyril, who was found outside the dorms. They also discuss Monica, with the prince deducing that she has ulterior motives for joining the student council. Elsewhere, Louis reveals to Rynzbelfeid the reason he is observing Felix stems from a power struggle for the throne. The next day, the student council begins to rebuild their public trust, and Cyril volunteers to help Monica introduce herself to the school club leaders.
5	"Adventure of the Silent Witch"; Transliteration: "Chinmoku no Majo no Bouken" (Japanese: 沈黙の魔女の冒険)	Yasuhiro Geshi	Takaomi Kanasaki	August 2, 2025
An earth dragon attacks the city of Craeme during Monica and Nero's day off, prompting her to secretly assist local mage Glenn Dudley with defeating it. The next day, while contemplating what elective course to join, Felix tricks her into trying out magic class, which results in her discovering that the teacher is her own former instructor, William Macragan. She also reunites with Glenn, who joins the school as a transfer student. Fearing that William will blow her cover, Monica sneaks out of the lecture and stumbles upon the chess course, where fellow student council member Elliott Howard challenges her to a game. Though inexperienced, Monica pressures Elliott and only loses when he uses an advanced move. Another day later, Monica and Elliott are sent to greet traders from the Abbott Company. However, Monica notices that they are impostors and magically startles one of their horses into knocking them out. Unfortunately, the animal then charges at her, but horse riding course student Casey Grove manages to calm it. Afterward, Monica befriends Casey and is asked to join her course, resulting in her signing up for both it and the chess course.
6	"A Cup out of Place"; Transliteration: "Bachigaina Ippai" (Japanese: 場違いな一杯)	Yū Nobuta	Takayuki Inagaki & Ryoma Kawakami (assistant)	August 9, 2025
Monica fails her ballroom dance test and practices for her retest, but struggles to master the art of dancing, even with Nero's assistance. Days later, Monica is assigned to a group for the tea party course with Lana, Casey, and Claudia, known as the Walking Library due to her intelligence. Isabella cautions Monica that the one absolute rule for a tea party is not to bring the same type of tea as somebody else. The tea party begins with Claudia calmly and bluntly criticizing Lana and Casey's choices of tea, which angers Lana. However, Claudia then begins talking about her admiration for the Silent Witch, whom she believes never speaks to anybody due to being aware of her superiority over them. This unnerves Monica, who thinks Claudia suspects her true identity, and she leaves to prepare her own tea, only to find her tea to have been thrown away. Monica instead serves everybody her favorite coffee, pointing out all she wants is to share her favorite drink with her friends and successfully passes the tea course. Monica then heads to her dancing retest, which is being overseen by Felix and Cyril. Thanks to their guidance and being distracted from overthinking her moves, Monica is able to successfully dance with the both of them.
7	"A Jealous Noblewoman"; Transliteration: "Akuyaku Reijō" (Japanese: 悪役令嬢)	Liao Chengzhi	Takaomi Kanasaki	August 16, 2025
To celebrate Monica passing the retest, Glenn throws a barbecue. After school, Monica receives a new dress as a gift from Louis through Rynzbelfeid and begins writing a thank you letter. The next day, Monica notices that Claudia has been tailing her, then reluctantly attends a tea party with Caroline. Monica drinks tea that Caroline poisoned with eye drops causing her to faint and recall the time her father was burned at stake for forbidden research. Claudia arrives to scold Caroline and bring Monica to the medical office. Sometime later, Monica wakes up and Claudia reveals that she is Cyril's younger sister and the fiancé of Neil Clay Maywood. Despite being jealous of Monica for dancing with Neil, Claudia declares herself to be a friend of Monica's. Meanwhile, Felix interrogates Caroline and her friends about the incident with Caroline, who claims it to be a prank. Isabelle is brought in and serves Caroline the same tea she served Monica. Caroline drinks it and loses her composure not knowing that the tea was not actually poisoned and humiliates herself. Isabelle warns Caroline that she will report her heinous actions to her father and that the Kerbeck family will withdraw its military protection of the Norn family if Monica is bullied again. One week later, Monica is discharged and returns to the attic greeted by Rynzbelfied, who reminds her about the thank you letter and wonders how the Silent Witch, who is supposed to be Felix's bodyguard, got herself poisoned.
8	"My Responsibility"; Transliteration: "Watashi no Sekimu" (Japanese: わたしの責務)	Kazuho Kunimoto	Takaomi Kanasaki	August 23, 2025
While doing warehouse inventory, a timber pile nearly falls on Casey, prompting Monica to take her to the infirmary. However, on the way, Monica notices that Casey caused the incident herself and confronts her about it. Nero then alerts Monica about a mana reaction, which she deduces comes from a magical bomb that Casey placed back in the warehouse, where Felix currently is. Casey then comes clean: she was the one who threw away Monica's tea and intends to assassinate Felix to prevent him from becoming a puppet king used by his benefactor, Duke Clockford, to start a war with Landor, a kingdom that aided her family in the past; the earlier incident was to give her an alibi. Though sympathetic, Monica resolves to stop the assassination, and Nero subdues Casey when she attempts to stop her. Not having enough time to return to the warehouse, Monica instead modifies the magical barrier that Louis and their fellow Sage, the Witch of Thorns, placed around the academy, disabling the bomb with no one aware of what transpired. However, this also causes Casey to deduce Monica's identity as a Sage. Louis then arrives, having sensed Monica's tampering, and demands an explanation.
9	"The Hidden Secret"; Transliteration: "Akasenu Himitsu" (Japanese: 明かせぬ秘密)	Mitsuyo Yokono	Takaomi Kanasaki	August 30, 2025
After being briefed on the situation, Louis takes Casey into custody. While her crime constitutes the death penalty, Monica convinces him to exile her instead, since the mother of First Prince Lionel, whose claim to the throne Louis backs, is from Landor; thus, exposing Casey could reflect badly on him. During that, Casey disowns Monica, telling her she should hate her for pretending to be her friend, but Monica refuses, stating that she is still her friend even after her betrayal. Afterward, Felix eavesdrops on Louis while he fixes the barrier, having learned from Wildianu about the tampering, and overhears that the Silent Witch, whom he secretly idolizes, saved his life. Three days later, Monica begins her horse-riding lessons but struggles without Casey, prompting Felix to teach her instead. Later, Monica has a chess match with Elliot during which the latter realizes that Felix's interest in her stems from her resemblance to the prince's shy younger self. After school, Monica ends up crying herself to sleep upon learning that, since Casey's assassination attempt was covered up, Cyril was blamed for the incident with the timber pile, after which the latter has Claudia take her back to her dorm. Meanwhile, the Starseer Witch of the Seven Sages, Mary Harvey, is concerned that she cannot foresee Felix's future.
9.5	"Undercover Report"; Transliteration: "Sennyū Kiroku" (Japanese: 潜入記録)	NA	NA	September 6, 2025
Recap of the first nine episodes of the series.
10	"Bernie Jones and Everett the Mute"; Transliteration: "Bānī Jōnzu to Mugon no Evaretto" (Japanese: バーニー・ジョーンズと無言のエヴァレット)	Misaki Nishimoto & Shinsuke Gomi	Misaki Nishimoto & Shinsuke Gomi	September 13, 2025
Two years ago when Monica was attending Minerva's Mage Training Institution, Bernie Jones, a noble from the House of Count Ambard and the top student at Minerva, saved Monica from bullies, befriending her shortly thereafter, and taught her quick-chanting magic. In the present, Monica, Elliott, and Benjamin Mording are chosen as representatives for the upcoming chess tournament against University and Minerva, which has Monica feeling uneasy. Monica recalls that after learning unchanted magic, she was forcefully dragged to the Seven Sages meeting when she was appointed as a Seven Sage member despite fainting during the interview. Her friendship with Bernie ended soon afterwards as he expressed his jealousy for Monica for surpassing him with unchanted magic. The next day, Nero and Rynzbelfeid become undercover students at Serendia to help Monica get through the tournament, while Lana helps Monica adjust her posture and appearance hoping that Bernie does not recognize her. The representatives from the competing institutions arrive with Bernie among them. Monica is approached by Bernie, who is suspicious about her, but before she can answer Nero and Rynzbelfeid arrive pretending to be in a love triangle relationship with her, and Bernie leaves.
11	"My Friend"; Transliteration: "Watashi no Tomodachi" (Japanese: わたしの友達)	Takayuki Inagaki	Liao Chengzhi	September 20, 2025
Monica wins her chess match, but gets approached by Bernie in private, the latter having deduced her identity. He then begins belittling Monica, causing her to break down, until Lana finds them and calls him out for his jealousy of Monica. After Bernie insults Lana, Monica stands up for herself and cuts ties with him. Afterward, an angered Bernie asks Minerva's chess instructor, Eugene Pitman, to be allowed to face Monica in the next match. However, he then notices that Pitman is an impostor—a mage from the Schwargald Empire using forbidden body-manipulation magecraft—who is out to assassinate Felix. Bernie tries to fight him, but is overpowered. Fortunately, Monica arrives, Rynzbelfeid having alerted her about the intruder, and she easily defeats him. Cyril and Neil then appear and ask what happened, causing Monica to worry about blowing her cover. However, Bernie protects her by taking credit for the assassin's defeat. Afterwards, the tournament gets cancelled, and Monica wonders why Bernie covered for her.
12	"Monica Becomes a Delinquent"; Transliteration: "Monika, Furyō ni Naru" (Japanese: モニカ、不良になる)	Akira Koremoto & Liao Chengzhi	Takaomi Kanazaki	September 27, 2025
Isabelle invites Monica to attend the bell-ringing festival in Corlapton to give the dead a send-off, but declines because she was summoned by Mary. That night, Monica visits Mary in her estate, who informs her that she will perform a magecraft offering at the Corlapton festival and asks Monica to observe it, as well as Felix's star that Mary could not foresee for ten years. Rynzbelfeid escorts Monica and Mary to Corlapton. Monica spots Felix and encounters the thief Bartholomeus, who shows her around the festival before she is found by Felix. Afterwards, Felix brings Monica to Cassandra's estate, while Bartholomeus finds Mary's magical item, the Starweaving Mira. While Cassandra's servant Doris dresses up Monica for the festival, Felix receives letters from Cassandra that were sent by Duke Clockford's opponents. Afterwards, Monica and Felix go around the festival and Monica spots a brooch crafted by Emanuel Darwin, the Gem mage of the Seven Sages, that Felix buys for her. When Felix goes off on his own for a moment, Rynzbelfeid and Mary's familiar inform Monica that the Starweaving Mira has been stolen.
13	"A Book's Worth"; Transliteration: "Hon no Kachi" (Japanese: 本の価値)	Yasuo Iwamoto	Takaomi Kanasaki	October 5, 2025
It's revealed that Bartholomeus examined the Starweaving Mira, only for it attach to him and attempt to abduct him, believing he is her lover. Monica pursues them both, and thinking Monica is a love rival, the Starweaving Mira attacks her. All the while, Mary watches, remarking Monica's actions tonight will determine a turning point for the nation. Monica uses her mind manipulation magic to pacify the Starweaving Mira, and hands both it and an unconscious Bartholomeus to Rynzbelfeid. She then reunites with Felix, who takes her to a used bookstore run by a man named Porter. It's there Monica discovers Felix being a fan of the Silent Witch, as well as a book her father wrote that survived the destruction of his research. Porter, revealing he was a friend of Monica's father, charges 2 gold coins for the book which Felix gladly pays for. The magecraft offering goes off without a hitch, with Rynzbelfeid suspecting Mary deliberately allowed the Starweaving Mira to be stolen, which Mary confirms since she had foreseen it. The next day, Monica and Felix part ways and return to the academy, where Monica decides to temporarily set aside her identity as the Silent Witch and simply enjoy life as a student.

== Reception ==
The series was ranked fourth in the tankōbon category in the 2023 edition of Takarajimasha's Kono Light Novel ga Sugoi! light novel guidebook. It topped the category in the 2026 edition.

== See also ==
- Victoria of Many Faces, another light novel series with the same illustrator
