= Shion Wakayama =

Japanese voice actress

- 若山 詩音
- Born: February 10, 1998 (age 28); Chiba Prefecture, Japan
- Occupation: Voice actress
- Years active: 2002–present
- Agent: Himawari Theatre Group
- Notable credits: Honkai: Star Rail as Yunli; Her Blue Sky as Aoi Aioi; SSSS.Dynazenon as Yume Minami; Takt Op. Destiny as Cosette Schneider/Destiny; Police in a Pod as Mai Kawai; Lycoris Recoil as Takina Inoue; The Girl I Like Forgot Her Glasses as Ai Mie; Too Many Losing Heroines! as Lemon Yakishio; Dandadan as Momo Ayase

Shion Wakayama (Japanese: 若山 詩音, Hepburn: Wakayama Shion; born February 10, 1998) is a Japanese voice actress affiliated with the Himawari Theatre Group. She joined the group at the age of three and did acting in various television dramas. She later became a voice actress and was cast in her first lead role as Aoi Aioi in Her Blue Sky. Some of her other major roles include Yume Minami in SSSS.Dynazenon, Cosette Schneider/Destiny in Takt Op. Destiny, Takina Inoue in Lycoris Recoil, Ai Mie in The Girl I Like Forgot Her Glasses, Ellen Joe in Zenless Zone Zero, Yunli in Honkai: Star Rail, Lemon Yakishio in Too Many Losing Heroines!, and Momo Ayase in Dandadan.

== Biography ==
Wakayama was born in Chiba Prefecture on February 10, 1998. She joined the Himawari Theatre Group at the age of three. In 2002, she was cast in her first role as Natsu in Toshii to Matsu. Being a fan of video games, Wakayama wanted to pursue a career in voice acting. She had a leading role for the anime film Her Blue Sky.

In 2022, Wakayama voiced Mai Kawai in Police in a Pod and Takina Inoue in Lycoris Recoil. In 2023, she was a recipient of the Best New Actor Award at the 17th Seiyu Awards. She voiced Momo Ayase in Dandadan.

== Filmography ==
=== Anime ===
Year	Title	Role(s)	Ref.
2019	Gundam Build Divers Re:Rise	Hinata Mukai	
2021	Mushoku Tensei: Jobless Reincarnation	Shizuka Nanahoshi	
2021	SSSS.Dynazenon	Yume Minami	
2021	Farewell, My Dear Cramer	Sawa Echizen	
2021	Takt Op. Destiny	Cosette Schneider/Destiny	
2022	Police in a Pod	Mai Kawai	
2022	Akebi's Sailor Uniform	Tomono Kojou	
2022	Lycoris Recoil	Takina Inoue	
2022	The Eminence in Shadow	Annerose Nichtsehen	
2022	Mobile Suit Gundam: The Witch from Mercury	Henao Jazz	
2023	The Girl I Like Forgot Her Glasses	Ai Mie	
2023	Zom 100: Bucket List of the Dead	Yukari	
2023	Pokémon: Paldean Winds	Ohara	
2023	Mushoku Tensei: Jobless Reincarnation Season 2	Shizuka Nanahoshi	
2024	Pon no Michi	Izumi Tokutomi	
2024	Tying the Knot with an Amagami Sister	Asahi Amagami	
2024	Too Many Losing Heroines!	Lemon Yakishio	
2024	Dandadan	Momo Ayase	
2025	Momentary Lily	Hinageshi Usuzumi	
2025	The Summer Hikaru Died	Yūki Tadokoro	
2025	Fermat Kitchen	Kagura Musashi	
2025	Shabake	Oharu	
2025	Li'l Miss Vampire Can't Suck Right	Maimi Suzuki	
2026	Easygoing Territory Defense by the Optimistic Lord	Arte	
2026	Playing Death Games to Put Food on the Table	Kotoha	
2026	Hell Teacher: Jigoku Sensei Nube	Megumi Akiyama	
2026	Kirio Fan Club	Nami Sometani	
2026	Marriagetoxin	Mei Kinosaki	
2026	Killed Again, Mr. Detective?	Lilithea	
2026	The Exiled Heavy Knight Knows How to Game the System	Luce Rubis	
2026	Victoria of Many Faces	Nonna	
2026	The Frontier Lord Begins with Zero Subjects	Alna	
2026	A Tale of the Secret Saint	Fia Ruud	
2027	Blade & Bastard	Berkanan	
2027	Just Like Mona Lisa	TBA	

=== Films ===
2019

- Her Blue Sky as Aoi Aioi

2021

- Farewell, My Dear Cramer: First Touch as Sawa Echizen
- Bright: Samurai Soul as Sonya

2023

- Gridman Universe as Yume Minami
- Girls und Panzer das Finale: Part 4 as Jouko

2025

- Tatsuki Fujimoto Before Chainsaw Man as Yuri Kōnosu

2026

- The Irregular at Magic High School: The Movie – Yotsuba Succession Arc as Kotona Tsutsumi

=== Web anime ===
2024

- Negative Happy as Chroe/Chroe Takanashi

2026

- Yu-Gi-Oh! Card Game The Chronicles as Ki-sikil
- Fool Night as Sumi Matsuno

=== Video games ===
2021

- World Flipper as Sariha
- Azur Lane as Yume Minami

2023

- Grandchase:Dimensional Chaser as Ganymede Jupiter
- Ys X: Nordics as Lila
- Magia Record as Heruka (Arc 2.5) and Takina Inoue (Agent Magica ~ Magireco x Lycoreco ~ event)
- Reverse: 1999 as Necrologist

2024

- Zenless Zone Zero as Ellen Joe
- Honkai: Star Rail as Yunli
- Genshin Impact as Lan Yan
- Ghost of Yōtei as Kiku

2025

- Death Stranding 2: On the Beach as Tomorrow
- MementoMori as Yildiz
- Reverse: 1999 as Lopera

2026

- Arknights: Endfield as Perlica

=== Dubbing ===
==== Live-action ====
- The Hate U Give as Starr Carter (Amandla Stenberg)
- Scream 7 as Tatum Evans (Isabel May)
- Vesper as Vesper (Raffiella Chapman)

==== Animation ====
- Bambi II as Thumper's Sister
