= Supervillain Boy =

Japanese manga series

- First tankōbon volume cover

大悪党少年 (Daiakutō Shōnen)
- Genre: Action; Fantasy comedy
- Manga
- Written by: Koume Fujichika
- Published by: Square Enix
- English publisher: NA: Square Enix
- Imprint: Gangan Comics Up!
- Magazine: Manga Up!
- Original run: December 11, 2024 – present
- Volumes: 5

Supervillain Boy (Japanese: 大悪党少年, Hepburn: Daiakutō Shōnen) is a Japanese manga series written and illustrated by Koume Fujichika. It began serialization on Square Enix's Manga Up! manga service in December 2024.

== Synopsis ==
Eta Yodaka is an anti-social 14-year-old orphan whose only friend is a demon only he can see. Tired of depending on inept heroes, Eta aspires to become a supervillain. Later, he starts to develop superpowers that enable him to become the villain he aspires to be.

== Publication ==
Written and illustrated by Koume Fujichika, Supervillain Boy began serialization on Square Enix's Manga Up! manga service on December 11, 2024. Its chapters have been compiled into five tankōbon volumes as of September 2026.

The series' chapters are published in English on Square Enix's Manga Up! Global manga service. During their panel at Anime Expo 2026, Square Enix Manga & Books announced that they had licensed the series for English publication, with the first volume set to release in February 2027.

No.	Original release date	Original ISBN	North American release date	North American ISBN
1	June 6, 2025	978-4-7575-9886-7	February 16, 2027	979-8-8991-0094-9
2	August 6, 2025	978-4-7575-9994-9	—	—
3	December 5, 2025	978-4-3010-0215-4	—	—
4	March 6, 2026	978-4-3010-0373-1	—	—
5	September 7, 2026	978-4-3010-0746-3	—	—

== Reception ==
The series was ranked fifteenth in the web category at the twelfth Next Manga Awards in 2026.

== See also ==
- The Girl I Like Forgot Her Glasses, another manga series by the same author
- I'm in Love with the Older Girl Next Door, another manga series by the same author
