= Yunli (Honkai: Star Rail) =

Video game character

- Honkai character
- Official portrait
- First game: Honkai: Star Rail (2024)
- Voiced by: EN: Brenna Larsen; ZH: Liu Wen; JA: Shion Wakayama; KO: Lee Ju-eun

In-universe information
- Species: Xianzhou Native (Note: Xianzhou natives are a subspecies of humans with longer-than-normal lifespans. They are one of the three long-life species that are part of the Xianzhou Alliance, alongside foxians such as Tingyun and Vidyadhara such as Dan Heng.)
- Weapon: Sword
- Home: Xianzhou Alliance
- Type: Physical
- Paths: Destruction (combat); The Hunt (lore)

Yunli (Chinese: 云璃; pinyin: Yúnlí) is a character from the video game Honkai: Star Rail, developed by miHoYo. In the game's lore, she is a huntress of cursed swords from the starship known as the Xianzhou Zhuming, and the granddaughter of an important general. Yunli became a playable character in version 2.4 of the game.

Her character story revolves around the tragedy caused by her father forging cursed swords, her desire to hunt down and destroy those swords by melting them, and her relationship with Yanqing as it shifts from conflict towards resolution. Critics discussed her Dunhuang tennin-style clothing, the contrast between her petite figure and her enormous sword, and her obsession with swords in general. They also praised her gameplay design, which centers on counterattacking after being hit.

== Design and voice acting ==
On July 25, 2024, miHoYo released the story trailer "Ichor of Two Dragons, A Furnace of Fire", which featured Yunli as the trailer's protagonist and introduced her identity as a sword huntress. Five days later, they released her character trailer "Serendipity", which shows her interacting with Jing Yuan, a powerful general, and fighting with a giant sword despite her small stature, creating a contrast with her everyday demeanor. She was released as a playable character in version 2.4 of the game on July 31.

Yunli comes from the starship known as the Xianzhou Zhuming, and is a straightforward sword huntress tasked with destroying cursed swords. She is also the granddaughter of Huaiyan, a great general, and the second-youngest genius swordfighter in the Flamewheel Octet, a military group. The Xianzhou Zhuming is led by Huaiyan and is known for its forging technology; around sixty to seventy percent of the weapons used by the Xianzhou Alliance come from the Zhuming's Artisanship Commission. Yunli wields a sword she calls "Old Mettle" as her weapon and enjoys collecting swords in daily life. As a huntress of cursed swords, she retrieves them and casts them into a furnace to be destroyed. Yunli is voiced in English by Brenna Larsen, in Chinese by Liu Wen, in Japanese by Shion Wakayama, and in Korean by Lee Ju-eun. Wakayama said in an interview that Yunli, as a swordswoman, was very strong since childhood and that in battle, she would swing a heavy greatsword and throw it at the enemy. Wakayama also thought that Yunli had a big appetite and that she was not picky about food, which she suggested might be the secret to her superior strength. She also characterized Yunli as a quiet and gentle girl.

== Appearances ==
=== Story ===
Yunli's father, Hanguang, was an artisan from the Xianzhou Zhuming. Obsessed with forging powerful weapons, he fused energy lifeforms known as heliobi (sing.: heliobus) into swords, causing large numbers of cursed swords that eroded human nature to spread. Those seeking the swords and those wielding them later caused a riot in the Flamewheel Octet Hall. Both of Yunli's parents died one after the other, while Yunli herself was rescued by "Flamewheel General" Huaiyan and raised by him. Under his instruction, she became a sword huntress, traveling from place to place to hunt down and destroy cursed swords. Yunli accompanied Huaiyan to the Xianzhou Luofu (another starship) to take part in the Wardance, a martial arts competition. On the way, she first repelled borisin (Note: Borisin are one of the peoples aboard the Xianzhou who are aligned with the Abundance and who are hostile to the Xianzhou Alliance.) who had attacked a transport ship belonging to the Interastral Peace Corporation (IPC). After she arrived on the Luofu, an imprisoned borisin prisoner being escorted there suddenly broke loose. Yanqing of the Cloud Knights, the local security force, attacked the fleeing borisin with a flying sword but missed. Yunli used the misfired flying sword to knock the borisin down, then took the sword away, believing that Yanqing did not deserve to possess it after missing his attack. The two argued repeatedly as a result, and Yunli only returned the flying sword after mediation by Feixiao. To make Yunli and Yanqing cooperate before the Wardance, Huaiyan arranged for them to train March 7th together, requiring the latter to defeat at least one challenger during the competition. March 7 also accepted a duel proposed by Skott, an IPC envoy, after standing up for a teahouse employee. Yunli and Yanqing therefore intensified her training, allowing her to ultimately defeat him.

In the companion mission "Swords to Plowshares", a delegation from the faraway world of Kalevala returns a Xianzhou treasure sword to the Luofu. Huaiyan reveals that the sword's true name is Guyun, that it was made by Hanguang, and that he intends to repair it slightly before using it as a prize for the Wardance. Because of her father's past in forging cursed swords, Yunli judges Guyun to be dangerous and at one point tries to destroy it by force. After the protagonist Trailblazer stops her, she agrees to first discuss the matter with Huaiyan. The next day, Guyun is stolen, and Yunli and the Trailblazer catch up with Argenti, a Knight of Beauty who has taken it away. From Guyun's memories, Yunli learns that it once fought alongside a Cloud Knight soldier of the Xianzhou Alliance on Kalevala against the borisin, but later left because it no longer wished to be treated as a mere tool for battle. Yunli ultimately melts Guyun down, reforges it into other things, and builds graves for Guyun and the aforementioned soldier.

During an uprising led by the borisin known as Hoolay, the Cloud Knights use the Wardance as a trap to lure the enemy in, while Yunli keeps watch aboard the Skysplitter, where the competition is being held. After Hoolay boards the ship, Yunli, Yanqing, and March 7 fight him together, but are initially overwhelmed. Later, Hoolay is weakened by the poisoned blood of Jiaoqiu, and Yanqing seizes the opportunity to subdue him until Feixiao arrives. Hoolay then releases a dangerous power known as the Crimson Moon. To protect the people there, Feixiao swallows the Crimson Moon and loses control of herself. The three then work together to hold Feixiao back until she kills Hoolay and regains consciousness. After the incident ends, Yunli and Yanqing's relationship improves. Before leaving the Luofu with Huaiyan, she invites Yanqing to bring his sword to the Zhuming someday for a rematch.

=== Gameplay ===
Yunli is a five-star Physical-damage character who walks the Path of Destruction in combat, although she walks the Path of The Hunt in the game's lore. Her combat mechanics center on counterattacks. When she is hit, she automatically counterattacks. Her Skill can restore her own hit points and area of effect damage, while her ultimate can make enemies attack Yunli and cause her to enter into a parry state, during which she launches a stronger counterattack when hit. If she is not hit during the aforementioned state, she instead launches a weaker counterattack.

== Reception ==
Yunli received positive responses from players and commentators. Fans expressed their fondness for her through activities such as cosplay. Regarding Yunli's character design, commentator Wu Yan from Game Teahouse argued that Yunli combines moe traits such as bare feet, twintails, and gluttony with a sense of divinity created by her red, blue-green, yellow, white and black color scheme, apsara-style clothing, and flame-patterned pibo sash. This juxtaposition of moe and sacredness, they argued, contrasts with her setting as Huaiyan's granddaughter, a member of the Flamewheel Octet and a combat-oriented character. They also said that the contrast between Yunli's petite frame, her heavy sword, and the weapon's name "Old Mettle" makes her image more distinctive. Her name, meanwhile, can evoke Buddhist imagery of clouds and lapis lazuli which, together with the Chinese cultural adaptations embodied by the Xianzhou Zhuming, forms the character's cultural background. Gamersky also identified her clothing reminiscent of that found in Dunhuang, Gansu; barefoot design; weapon name and the combination of her small build with a large sword as elements that generated discussion when the character first appeared. Siliconera editor Stephanie Liu argued that Yunli's design can call to mind Dunhuang apsaras and dance, but also criticized her character trailer and combat animations for emphasizing shots of her bare feet, saying that this presentation felt abrupt when paired with Yunli's young appearance. She also wrote that Yunli's action choreography did not fully continue the dance imagery, leaving that aspect of the design insufficiently developed on screen.

Regarding her characterization, one Gamersky commentator said that scenes such as Yunli taking Yanqing's flying sword when she first appeared and attempting to melt down the treasure sword that had been returned to the Xianzhou had initially sparked controversy among players. However, as her past was revealed, her blunt actions gained clearer motivation. She is initially portrayed as a lively and straightforward girl who directly expresses her opinions to Yanqing, Jing Yuan, the Trailblazer and Huaiyan alike. After her background is revealed, this straightforwardness takes on a sense of clarity, showing that she has retained her true nature despite trauma, while also giving her earlier childishness a clearer emotional source. The commentator also said that Huaiyan's upbringing prevented her childhood tragedy from pushing her to extremes, and allowed her to retain discernment despite her impulsivity. For example, her refusal to return Yanqing's sword stems from her judgment of a sword wielder's character, while after learning Guyun's history, she is able to set aside her bias and help fulfill the sword's wish. Wu Yan likewise argued that the companion mission "Swords to Plowshares" is what truly fleshes out her character; her obsession with swords and respect for their wills runs through both her taking Yanqing's flying sword and her handling of Guyun. Wu Yan argued that Yunli does not hunt swords merely to atone for her father's sins; she also loves them, cares about how they are used, and views humans and swords as equals. Thus when the sword's will exceeds that of a human, it becomes cursed, while when a human's will is unworthy of the sword, that is considered a desecration of the sword. Discussing Yunli's obsession with swords, the Gamersky commentator argued that this fervor is a microcosm of the Zhuming artisans' dedication, connecting her mission to hunt cursed swords with the local forging culture and pursuit of craftsmanship. Wu Yan, meanwhile, argued that the Zhuming concept of swords being a kind of will is expressed through Yunli's love of swords, her respect for a sword's will, and her judgment of a sword user's character. She takes Yanqing's flying sword because she judges him to be unstable and thinks he is unworthy to use the sword in his hand.

The character trailer "Serendipity" was Yunli's final trailer before becoming playable. In the trailer, Jing Yuan teases her with snacks, after which a dog snatches the food away, leading Yunli to chase it into the Shackling Prison and fight enemies there. Liu argued that the trailer displays both Yunli's strength and childish personality, and that the finishing move she uses to defeat the enemy at the end reminded her of Saber from the Fate series. According to Game Corner, Japanese netizens pointed out that the battle storyboard resembled shots of Saber Alter from Fate/stay night: Heaven's Feel, with some users comparing the scenes through overlay images. Since Honkai: Star Rail had already announced at the time that it would collaborate with Fate/stay night: Unlimited Blade Works in 2025, some fans wondered if Yunli might be connected to the later collaboration storyline.

Regarding Yunli's gameplay, Eurogamer commentator Jessica Orr and HK01 commentator Lam Cheuk-hang both wrote that Yunli has self-healing, taunting and counterattacking capabilities. Orr described her as a damage dealer capable of handling both single-target and area-of-effect combat, while Lam said that in some situations she can also serve as a sustain character, and can join teams as either a main or secondary damage dealer. Kotaku commentator Samuel Moreno also praised Yunli's counterattack gameplay, calling her a strong choice among counterattack-based damage dealers, with consistent counterattacks that usually deal area-of-effect damage. He said that all of Yunli's counterattacks are treated by the game as follow-up attacks, making her suitable for teams with characters who support follow-up attacks or provide energy. Pocket Tactics editor Holly Alice and Liu likewise both recommended pairing Yunli with teammates who can do so. Liu recommended using characters who can help Yunli use her ultimate more quickly, and also mentioned follow-up attack teams and said that she can protect more fragile teammates through taunts and counterattacks, but that characters with low defensive ability should not be placed near Yunli.
