= Masahiro Itō =

Japanese voice actor

- 伊藤 昌弘
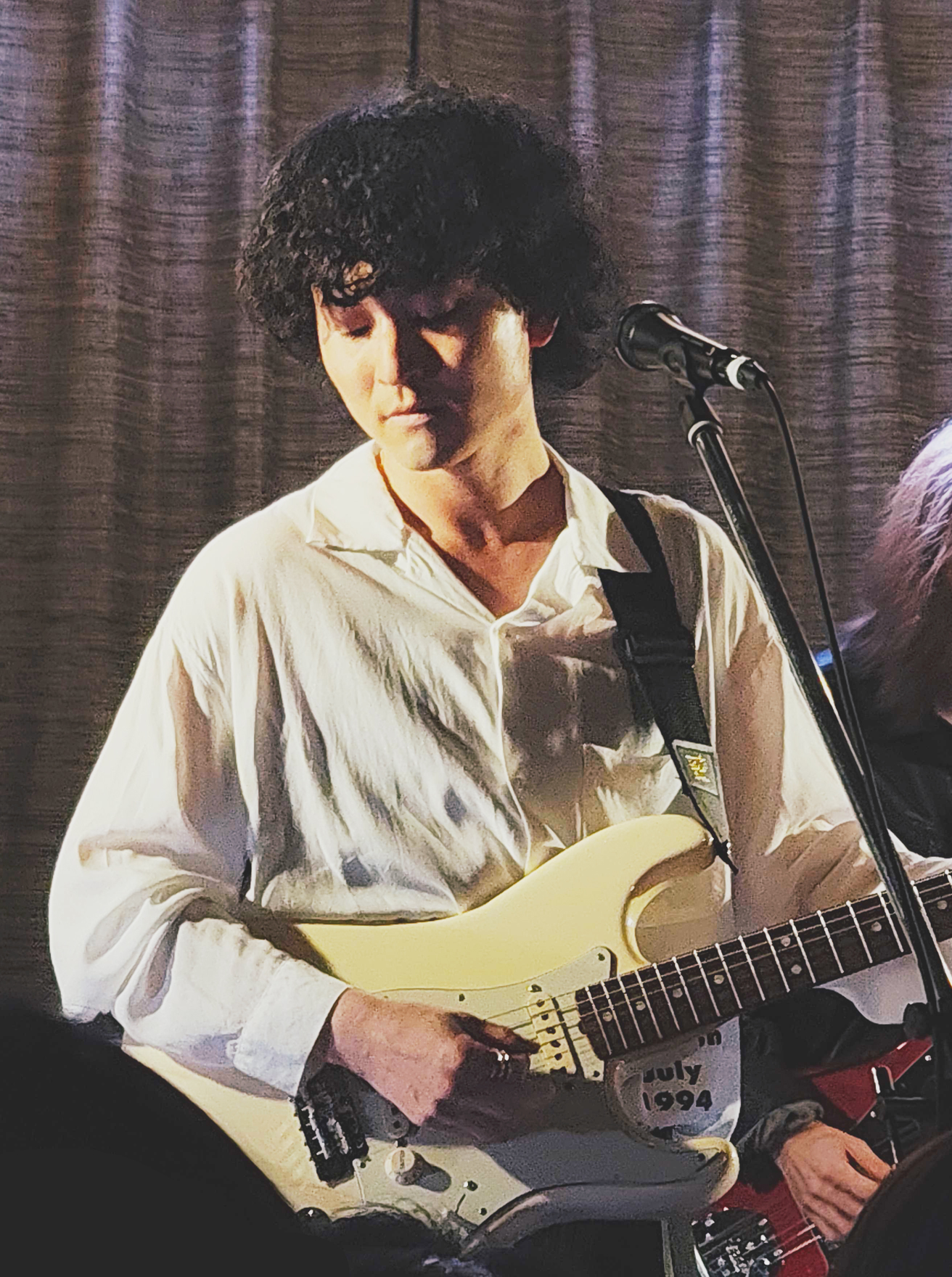
- Masahiro Ito
- Born: July 24, 1992 (age 34); Fukuroi, Shizuoka, Japan
- Education: Nagoya College of Music
- Occupations: Voice actor, singer
- Years active: 2013–present
- Agent: Hibiki
- Known for: From Argonavis as Ren Nanahoshi; Remake Our Life! as Kyouya Hashiba; The Girl I Like Forgot Her Glasses as Kaede Komura

Masahiro Itō (伊藤 昌弘, Itō Masahiro; born July 24, 1992) is a Japanese voice actor and singer from Fukuroi, Shizuoka who is affiliated with Hibiki. He is known for his roles as Ren Nanahoshi in From Argonavis, Kyouya Hashiba in Remake Our Life!, and Kaede Komura in The Girl I Like Forgot Her Glasses.

== Career ==
Itō graduated from the Nagoya College of Music, where he majored in the trumpet. In 2013, he formed the music unit Nabakari President (名ばかりプレジデント, Nabakari Prejidento), which was active until 2016. After moving to Tokyo in 2016, he would continue music activities as an independent musician. In 2018, he was cast as the character Ren Nanahoshi in the franchise From Argonavis, later reprising the role for its 2020 anime series. In 2021, he played Zakusa Ishigame in Cardfight!! Vanguard Overdress and Kyouya Hashiba in Remake Our Life!. He also received the Best New Actor Award at the 15th Seiyu Awards.

== Filmography ==
=== Anime ===
2020

- Argonavis from BanG Dream!, Ren Nanahoshi

2021

- Cardfight!! Vanguard Overdress, Zakusa Ishigame
- Remake Our Life!, Kyouya Hashiba

2022

- Cardfight!! Vanguard will+Dress, Zakusa Ishigame
- I've Somehow Gotten Stronger When I Improved My Farm-Related Skills, Reaks

2023

- The Girl I Like Forgot Her Glasses, Kaede Komura

TBA

- Station Idol Latch!, Miharu Suwa

=== Video games ===
2023

- Ys X: Nordics, Larg
