= I'm in Love with the Older Girl Next Door =

Japanese manga series

- First tankōbon volume cover

隣のお姉さんが好き (Tonari no Onee-san ga Suki)
- Genre: Romantic comedy
- Manga
- Written by: Koume Fujichika
- Published by: Akita Shoten
- English publisher: NA: Seven Seas Entertainment
- Imprint: Young Champion Comics
- Magazine: Manga Cross
- Original run: August 25, 2021 – October 4, 2023
- Volumes: 4
- icon

I'm in Love with the Older Girl Next Door (Japanese: 隣のお姉さんが好き, Hepburn: Tonari no Onee-san ga Suki) is a Japanese web manga series written and illustrated by Koume Fujichika. It was serialized on Akita Shoten's online platform Manga Cross from August 2021 to October 2023, with its chapters collected in four tankōbon volumes.

== Publication ==
Written and illustrated by Koume Fujichika, I'm in Love with the Older Girl Next Door was serialized on Akita Shoten's online platform Manga Cross from August 25, 2021, to October 4, 2023. Akita Shoten collected its chapters in four tankōbon volumes, released from May 19, 2022, to December 20, 2023.

In October 2024, Seven Seas Entertainment announced that they had licensed the series for English publication beginning in March 2025.

=== Volumes ===
No.	Original release date	Original ISBN	English release date	English ISBN
1	May 19, 2022	978-4-253-30474-0	March 18, 2025	979-8-89373-146-0
2	December 20, 2022	978-4-253-30475-7	July 15, 2025	979-8-89373-147-7
3	June 20, 2023	978-4-253-30476-4	November 4, 2025	979-8-89373-463-8
4	December 20, 2023	978-4-253-30477-1	March 17, 2026	979-8-89373-464-5

== Reception ==
The series was nominated for the 2022 Next Manga Award in the web manga category. It was again nominated for the same award in the following year.

== See also ==
- The Girl I Like Forgot Her Glasses, another manga series by the same author
- Supervillain Boy, another manga series by the same author
