= Takt Op =

Japanese media franchise

- Genre: Music; Science fiction; Action
- Created by: Bandai Namco Arts; DeNA; Oji Hiroi
- Anime television series

Takt Op. Destiny
- Directed by: Yūki Itō
- Written by: Kiyoko Yoshimura
- Music by: Yoshihiro Ike
- Studio: MAPPA; Madhouse
- Licensed by: Crunchyroll (streaming); SA/SEA: Medialink
- Original network: TXN (TV Tokyo), BS TV Tokyo
- English network: SEA: Aniplus Asia
- Original run: October 6, 2021 – December 22, 2021
- Episodes: 12
- Manga

Takt Op. Destiny: Haruka Tsuioku no Anna – Harmony of Hope
- Written by: Kino
- Published by: Media Factory
- Magazine: Monthly Comic Alive
- Original run: August 26, 2022 – present
- Volumes: 1
- Video game

Takt Op. Symphony
- Developer: Game Studio/DeNA
- Publisher: JP: Bandai Namco Arts; CN: WAPTX; Global: DeNA HONG KONG
- Genre: Role-playing game
- Platform: Android, iOS
- Released: June 28, 2023
- Manga

Takt Op. Bara no Dangan (Kuchidzuke) de Utte!
- Written by: Aya Takaha
- Illustrated by: Ika Nakaya
- Published by: Media Factory
- Magazine: Comic Alive+
- Original run: July 27, 2023 – present
- icon

Takt Op (Japanese: タクトオーパス, Hepburn: Takuto Ōpasu; stylized as takt op. or {tákt: op.}) (Note: "Op." is an abbreviation for Opus number, the "work number" that is assigned to a musical composition.) is a Japanese mixed-media project about classical music produced by Bandai Namco Arts and DeNA. An anime television series produced by MAPPA and Madhouse titled Takt Op. Destiny aired from October to December 2021. A mobile game developed by Game Studio titled Takt Op. Symphony, which was originally set to release in 2021, was released in June 2023 and subsequently shut down in April 2024.

== Plot ==
Takt Op is set in the year 2047, a future world where music cannot be played freely because it attracts monsters called "D2s". (Note: Stands for "Despair Dolls") These monsters were produced by a black meteorite containing Black Night Siderites which fell from the sky years ago. They hate the music produced by humans and are drawn to the music source and attempt to destroy it, as it is the only thing that can hurt and kill them. To combat the D2s, the Symphonica International Organization and the Musicarts combine their powers to defend the cities from D2s.

== Characters ==
=== Main ===
Takt Asahina (朝雛タクト, Asahina Takuto)
Voiced by: Koki Uchiyama (Japanese); Jason Liebrecht (English)
A Conductor who makes a pact with Destiny. He prioritizes music over everything. He generally appears lazy and unfriendly, but he is obsessed with music and has outstanding piano skills. His father was Kenji Asahina, a famous conductor who was killed 10 years ago by the D2s. Takt's right arm has the ability to become a powerful weapon which can transform into a conductor's baton and directs Destiny to fight the D2s.
Destiny (運命, Unmei)
A Musicart born from Symphony No. 5 (Beethoven), whose resides in the Schneider sisters as her vessel. She serves as Takt's main partner.

Cosette Schneider (コゼット・シュナイダー, Kozetto Shunaidā)
Voiced by: Shion Wakayama (Japanese); Emi Lo (English)
Destiny's first vessel. She was once the human named Cosette Schneider, the younger sister of Anna and Takt's childhood friend, who became a Musicart connected with Takt after she died protecting him from the D2s. Due to her unnatural process of becoming a Musicart, Destiny's condition is deemed unstable and she has no memory of being Cosette. She uses a vast amount of energy combatting D2s and must consume calories to recharge herself and is especially attracted to sweets and cakes.
Anna Schneider (アンナ・シュナイダー, Anna Shunaidā)
Voiced by: Kaede Hondo (Japanese); Alexis Tipton (English)
Takt's childhood friend and the older sister of Cosette—now Destiny. She takes the two of them on a journey to New York on a quest to rectify Destiny's unstable condition. Following Destiny Cosette's disappearance in the anime finale, she became the inheritor of Destiny's musicart identity and its second vessel and joined New York Symphonica as both a Conductor and a Musicart, though unlike her sister, she still retains her memories as her personality with Destiny's is fused.

=== New York Symphonica ===
Sagan (ザーガン, Zāgan)
Voiced by: Eiji Hanawa (Japanese); Christopher Wehkamp (English)
Chief Executive Officer of New York Symphonica, an organization which aims to annihilate D2. He also serves as the Grand Maestro (GM).
Felix Schindler (シントラー, Shintorā)
Voiced by: Daisuke Namikawa (Japanese); Jeff Swearingen (English)
A conductor and former Head Commander of New York Symphonica under the Grand Maestro Sagan. He dislikes music because it appeals to the emotions and he pursues his own agenda to gain power and control.
Leonard Flyheart (レナード・フライハート, Renādo Furaihāto)
Voiced by: Satoshi Hino (Japanese); Reagan Murdock (English)
Leonard, or mostly referred as Lenny, is a conductor with the New York Symphonica who rides a motorcycle and travels with the Musicart Titan. He and Titan help Takt adjust his new life as Conductor. It is revealed that he was a pupil to Kenji Asahina, whose death become a reason for him to fight the D2s.
Charlotte Schneider (シャルロッテ・シュナイダー, Sharurotte Shunaidā)
Voiced by: Ai Kakuma (Japanese); Michelle Rojas (English)
Nicknamed Lotte, Charlotte is the older sister of Anna and Cosette who works for New York Symphonica on its Department of Technology Advancement. She lives with their parents in New York and uses a wheelchair.

=== Musicart ===
Titan (タイタン, Taitan)
Voiced by: Miku Itō (Japanese); Natalie Hoover (English)
A Musicart born from Symphony No. 1 (Mahler) who travels with Lenny. She is carefree and sometimes explains things with onomatopoeia, but shows serious attitude on some occasions.
Tengoku (Heaven) (天国, Tengoku)
Voiced by: Inori Minase (Japanese); Celeste Perez (English)
A Musicart who belongs to New York Symphonica and is paired with the Conductor Grand Maestro Sagan. She uses an umbrella-shaped device which can be used for defense or as a weapon to fire powerful blasts at her enemies.
Jigoku (Hell) (地獄, Jigoku)
Voiced by: Reina Ueda (Japanese); Marti Etheridge (English)
A Musicart with the New York Symphonica and who has made a pact with Schindler and acts as his protector. She possesses a tuning fork which can emit a tone that gives her the ability to control D2s. Her primary weapons are her feet which she can transform into spinning discs with destructive power.
Valkyrie (Walküre) (ワルキューレ, Warukyūre)
Voiced by: Sumire Uesaka (Japanese); Lexi Nieto (English)
A Musicart not assigned to a specific Conductor and following her dismissal by Schindler she acts independently. She is born from Die Walküre and her primary weapons are a sword and shield which she can throw like a spinning disc.
Orpheus (地獄のオルフェ, Jigoku no orufe)
Voiced by: Kotono Mitsuishi (Japanese); Brina Palencia (English)
A mysterious Musicart who appears following the fusion of Tengoku and Jigoku. The character is based on Jacques Offenbach's Orpheus in the Underworld.

== Media ==
=== Video game ===
On March 26, 2021, Bandai Namco Arts and DeNA announced the Takt Op. project, which consists of a mobile game and anime series. The game, titled Takt Op. Unmei wa Akaki Senritsu no Machi o (takt op. 運命は真紅き旋律の街を; "Takt Op. Destiny in the City of Crimson Melody"), is developed by Game Studio. It was initially scheduled to be released in 2021, but was delayed to 2022, and then to June 28, 2023. The game was released in English in late 2023, under the title Takt Op. Symphony, with a beta test taking place in April.

The game ended service on April 9, 2024.

=== Anime ===
An anime series was announced as part of the project. It was later revealed to be a television series produced by MAPPA and Madhouse titled Takt Op. Destiny (stylized as takt op.Destiny). The series is directed by Yūki Itō, with Kiyoko Yoshimura handling the series' scripts, and Yoshihiro Ike composing the music. LAM provided the original character designs, and Reiko Nagasawa adapted those designs for the anime series. It aired from October 6 to December 22, 2021, on TV Tokyo and its affiliates. Crunchyroll streamed the series outside of Asia. Medialink licensed the series in Southeast Asia, South Asia, and Oceania minus Australia and New Zealand. The company also licensed the anime to Aniplus Asia for TV airings. The opening theme is "takt" by Ryo from Supercell featuring vocals from Mafumafu and gaku, while the ending theme is "Symphonia" by Mika Nakashima.

On April 22, 2022, Crunchyroll announced that the series will receive an English dub, which premiered the following day.

==== Episodes ====
No.	Title	Directed by (Note: Information is taken from the ending credits of each episode.)	Written by	Storyboarded by	Original release date
1	"Conduct -Creed-"; Transliteration: "Shiki-Kurīdo-" (Japanese: 指揮-Creed-)	Katsuya Shigehara	Kiyoko Yoshimura	Takahiro Miura	October 6, 2021
Conductor Takt Asahina is heading to New York with Anna Schneider and a Musicart called Destiny, but Takt's obsession to play music attracts D2s, delaying their progress. They encounter a nest of D2s in a remote industrial facility, apparently controlled by a hidden force that impedes their progress. Takt plays an upright piano to draw it out, and they discover that it is a Black Stone D2, attracted by Black Night Siderites. Takt calls forth Destiny and titanic battles ensues, but she manages to destroy the stone and they continue on their journey.
2	"Music -Reincarnation-"; Transliteration: "Ongaku-Riinkānēshon-" (Japanese: 音楽-Reincarnation-)	Takahiro Kaneko	Kiyoko Yoshimura	Yūki Itō	October 13, 2021
A flashback shows Takt Asahina father's funeral and the period later when he was living with Anna and her sister Cosette. For years, Takt spent his time tirelessly mastering the piano in his garage, glossing over his own well being and health, concerning both Anna and Cosette. A month and a half before the events of the first episode, Takt discovers Cosette skillfully playing the piano, shocking him. She wants him to play publicly at the Symphonica event to be held in town the following month, but he initially refuses. Two weeks before the events of the first episode, the event rolls around, and Takt does show himself in public for the first time. Cosette joins him in a four hands rendition of popular uptempo music, delighting the crowd. However, the town is suddenly attacked by D2s. Takt's right arm is damaged and Cosette is fatally injured. As she dies, however, Cosette's white stone pendant reincarnates her as Destiny. As she transforms, Destiny bites off Takt's damaged arm and presents him with a golden conducting baton.
3	"Awakening -Journey-"; Transliteration: "Kakusei-Jānī-" (Japanese: 覚醒-Journey-)	Tomoya Kitagawa	Kiyoko Yoshimura	Tōru Iwazawa, Yūki Itō, Ken'ichi Shimizu	October 20, 2021
Together, Takt and Destiny destroy a large number of D2s, then Destiny collapses. More D2s arrive, but the Conductor Lenny arrives on his motorcycle with the Musicart Titan and they defeat them. Later, Destiny awakens but has no recollection of her former life as Cosette. Lenny explains that without undergoing the normal Musicart process Destiny is in an unstable condition. To rectify this, Anna proposes taking Takt and Destiny to the Symphonica based in New York for treatment, and where her older sister Lotte is studying. However, they must avoid the central states, which are a dead zone filled with D2 poison. Suddenly, more D2s appear and Destiny immediately attacks them, weakening Takt, which causes Lenny to suspect that Destiny's uncontrolled use of power could be depleting Takt's life force. Titan and Destiny eliminate the D2s, but Destiny destroys Takt's house in the process. Following the battle, Anna, Takt and Destiny drive off for New York via Las Vegas, accompanied by Lenny and Titan.
4	"Let the Performance Begin -Showtime-"; Transliteration: "Kaien-Shōtaimu-" (Japanese: 開演-Showtime-)	Takashi Igari, Tomoko Hiramuki, Takahiro Kaneko	Kōsuke Isshiki, Kiyoko Yoshimura	Tsutomu Miyazawa	October 27, 2021
10 days after Destiny's appearance, the group arrives in Las Vegas. Lenny attempts to teach Takt and Destiny to harmonize and be more effective at defeating D2s. They meet Jonathan, who takes them his farming community near Las Vegas owned by Mr. Lang, a place where he and his partner Maggie live and work with other locals who have been displaced by the D2s. Meanwhile, Destiny detects a vibration and decides to immediately investigate by bursting out through the farmhouse wall. Takt and Anna follow her through a prohibited area, until they arrive at a building that contains a fully operational casino, unbeknownst to the local farmers. Lenny is already there with Lang, whose armed men try to apprehend Destiny. Suddenly D2s burst in from below ground. Lenny instructs Takt and Destiny on how to defeat the D2s in the most efficient way, treating it as a musical performance, allowing them to complete the task with the minimum of wasted energy. During the chaos, Lang tries to escape with the profits from both the casino and farmland but he is stopped by Titan. Later, Takt, Anna, and Destiny continue on to New York together while Lenny and Titan depart taking information to Symphonica about Lang's dishonest dealings.
5	"Equitation -Valkyrie-"; Transliteration: "Kikō-Warukyūre-" (Japanese: 騎行-Valkyrie-)	Eiji Sudō	Akira Kindaichi	Ken'ichi Shimizu	November 3, 2021
A week after the events of the first episode, Commander Felix Schindler of the New York Symphonica learns of the emergence of Takt and Destiny and decides to investigate the unknown Conductor and Musicart himself. On the road to New Orleans, Anna, Takt and Destiny encounter a train which Schindler is using to transport Black Night Siderites to a Symphonica facility in Houston, accompanied by his Musicart, Jigoku, and Conductor-less Musicart, Valkyrie. He invites Anna's group to travel with them, though Takt is mistrustful of Schindler's motives. Attracted by the Black Night Siderites, the train is attacked by a horde of flying D2s, so Destiny and Valkyrie rush out to repel them. With Takt's help in directing Destiny's blasts, they manage to destroy them. Takt becomes uncharacteristically friendly with Valkyrie, which smittens her. However, when another huge D2 appears, both Destiny and Valkyrie have depleted their energy. As such, Schindler sends out Jigoku, who had been inactive, to destroy it. Later, Schindler changes his delivery plans and dismisses Valkyrie. He invites Takt and Destiny to join him, but Takt pointedly refuses, leaving Schindler fuming.
6	"Sunrise -Rooster-"; Transliteration: "Asahi-Rūsutā-" (Japanese: 朝陽-Rooster-)	Takahiro Kaneko, Yasuhiro Geshi, Hiromi Nishiyama	Kiyoko Yoshimura	Masako Satō	November 10, 2021
As Anna, Takt and Destiny travel on, Destiny appears to be acquiring better communication skills. They arrive in New Orleans and find it occupied only by a few elderly people. Anna and Destiny buy supplies in a small store, helping the owner dispatch groceries, and fixing the floor of the lady who bought them. One elderly woman invites Anna and Destiny into her home, believing Anna is her daughter María. Her husband explains to Anna that María passed away a long time ago, but continues to live constantly on her mind. Alone, Takt finds a bar where they play music, including that of his late father Kenji. When Takt reveals he is Kenji's son, the owner takes him to a soundproofed basement venue where he plays "Rhapsody in Blue" on the piano to an appreciative audience of the bar's patrons. One patron reveals he had the chance to play with Kenji when he came to New Orleans, and is pleased to know that the Asahina music lineage is in good hands. Anna and Destiny find him, and comment on Takt's inmense passion on the way he plays. The trio continue on their way to New York, as Conductor Sagan learns through Schindler that Takt, the son of the "Rooster", is alive, and now a Conductor.
7	"Truth -Noise-"; Transliteration: "Shinjitsu-Noizu-" (Japanese: 真実-Noise-)	Yūsuke Kubo	Akira Kindaichi	Yūsuke Kubo	November 17, 2021
Takt and company arrive in one of a number of cities in the southern states being evacuated after heavy D2 activity. Under questioning from Anna, Takt confesses that he has been composing his own music on his mind. Anna provides him with a melodica, which he uses to help him write his composition on some music sheets. While on a walk, Takt sees Destiny providing assistance and bonding with the town's refugees, stunning him. Anna explains to him that their experiences on their journey have made Destiny more human, as have the people they have met. She also tells him it was Destiny who sourced the melodica for him, as she wants to support his love for music. In a diner, Destiny reveals to Takt she now knows she is inhabiting Cosette's body, and asks him what Cosette meant for him and Anna. Meanwhile in New York, Sagan forbids Schindler from interfering with Takt, angering him. Back in the south, Takt and Destiny defeat a D2 in the outskirts of the city. They investigate a nearby forest and encounter Schindler and Jigoku, who demonstrates her power to attract and awaken D2s using a tuning fork, which plays a note the D2's are attracted to. Schindler reveals that he has been using her power to clear out the poorest settlements in the country, which he sees as a drain on the limited resources. He proclaims himself a hero, as he believes he is giving rise to a nation in which only the gifted will survive. Schindler then admits he first used Jigoku's power on Takt's town, in the attack in which Cosette was killed. Takt, enraged, swears to kill him.
8	"Destiny -Cosette-"; Transliteration: "Unmei-Kozetto-" (Japanese: 運命-Cosette-)	Hirofumi Okita	Akira Kindaichi	Ken'ichi Shimizu	November 24, 2021
Takt recklessly attacks Schindler, but he is severely wounded by Jigoku. Destiny retreats, taking Takt to a nearby cave to aid him. While Takt rests, he tells Destiny how he met Cosette, and that since her death he has no one to compose for. However encourages him to continue, and expresses her wish of getting to listen to his music freely. Meanwhile, Lenny and Titan arrive in town and tell Anna that they are on the trail of Schindler, who is after Takt and Destiny. Without relying on her Musicart power, Destiny attacks Jigoku alone, but she is overpowered until Titan intervenes to help. Leonard and Schindler's Musicarts fight until Takt appears, and empowers Destiny with his directing, allowing her to fight Jigoku on equal terms. The battle rages until Tengoku, Sagan's Musicart, arrives and declares that Sagan has relieved Schindler from his position for disobeying his orders. Jigoku then follows Tengoku and abandons Schindler, who is left humiliated and no longer a Conductor. Takt and Destiny return to Anna's side, while Takt realizes that his right arm is becoming weaker.
9	"Family -Eroica-"; Transliteration: "Kazoku-Eroika-" (Japanese: 家族-Eroica-)	Mitsue Yamasaki, Yoriho Ishikawa	Kiyoko Yoshimura	Mitsue Yamasaki, Yoriho Ishikawa	December 1, 2021
Takt, Destiny and Anna arrive in the heavily populated New York City. As the city is the Symphonica's headquarters, it has been spared from the influence of D2's, even though it is still unsafe to play music. They reunite with the rest of Anna's family and Anna's older sister, Charlotte, examines Takt and Destiny at the Symphonica headquarters. She concludes that their symbiotic condition is irreversible, and that using their powers are draining both of their life forces simultaneously. The only option possible for them to live longer lives, would be to stand aside from fighting, and watch from afar. Charlotte and Anna take Takt and Destiny for a stroll around the city, eventually leaving the pair alone so they can enjoy some time together. On their way back home, Destiny hears the sound of Jigoku's tuning fork coming from underground, which she and Takt suspect is being used to attract D2's. Once at home, Takt is contacted by Lenny, who instructs him to evacuate New York with Destiny and the others. Takt demands to know the real situation, so Lenny agrees to reveal to Takt the truth regarding Symphonica's intentions and the Boston incident that led to Kenji's death 10 years earlier.
10	"Master and Pupil -Lenny-"; Transliteration: "Shitei-Renī-" (Japanese: 師弟-Lenny-)	Tomoya Kitagawa	Akira Kindaichi	Tomoya Kitagawa	December 8, 2021
Takt and Destiny meet Lenny and Titan, but their discussion is interrupted by Sagan, who orders Tengoku and Jigoku to attack them. During the fight, Lenny tells Takt that he was Kenji's apprentice and friend, and that he was there when Kenji was killed during the Boston incident. Lenny was later recruited by Sagan, who saw he met the necessary physical standards to become a Conductor. He partnered with Titan to fight for the Symphonica, but they left the organization after they became suspicious of Sagan's motives, uncovering the truth after they interrogated Schindler. As they battle, Destiny loses her powers when Takt collapses from exhaustion. Tengoku points her weapon at the vulnerable Takt, but Lenny shields him with his body. Mortally wounded, Lenny unleashes the full power of Titan, who severely injures Tengoku and forces Sagan to retreat. Lenny confesses to Takt that he had wanted to apologize to him in the past for having been unable to save Kenji, and became a Conductor to rectify his mistake. Takt promises to include his experiences with Lenny as a part of his music composition. As he dies, Lenny sees a vision where he is playing his cello alongside Takt and his piano, as a proud Kenji watches from the stands.
11	"Preparing for Battle -Orpheus-"; Transliteration: "Rinsen-Orufe-" (Japanese: 臨戦-Orpheus-)	Yasuhiro Geshi, Takahiro Kaneko	Kiyoko Yoshimura	Shigeyuki Miya	December 15, 2021 (Note: This episode aired at 12:10 a.m. JST, 10 minutes after the original air time on TV Tokyo.)
Following their fight with Sagan and his Musicarts, Charlotte proposes to hold Takt and Destiny in a cryogenic state while she tries to find a cure for their condition. Meanwhile, Sagan impales his hand on a Black Night Siderite crystal in the middle of the Symphonica building, causing huge crystals containing pods of D2s to erupt throughout New York. Musicarts from all over attempt to stop the D2's, resulting in a city-wide chaos. Emboldened by the cause, yet still heartbroken about Lenny's death, Titan leads Takt and Destiny into the Symphonica to rescue the two Schneider sisters and stop Sagan. They are confronted by a huge number of D2s, and although they destroy them, Takt becomes even weaker. Valkyrie appears and defends Anna and Charlotte from D2s, and the two groups are reunited. Takt orders Titan to take Valkyrie, Anna and Charlotte to safety, having resolved with Destiny that they will continue to fight to restore music, being fully aware of their predicament. Worried for their safety, Anna impulsively kisses Takt, before he and Destiny head off to search for Sagan. The pair are soon confronted by Jigoku holding the wounded Tengoku. Jigoku shoots a sound ray from her tuning fork into them, dissolving them and causing them to reemerge as the single Musicart, Orpheus.
12	"Takt -Hope-"; Transliteration: "Takuto-Hōpu-" (Japanese: 託人(タクト)-Hope-)	Katsuya Shigehara	Kiyoko Yoshimura	Ken'ichi Shimizu, Katsuya Shigehara	December 22, 2021
Destiny inflicts severe damage on Orpheus and remains to complete the task while Takt presses forward to find Sagan. A flashback shows the battles and sacrifices Sagan made during the war against the D2s. Takt finds Sagan impaled in a Siderite crystal deep within the facility. He tells Takt that he intends to seal off all the D2s with himself to save the world, but destroying the continent in the process, proclaiming it as a "symphony of joy and despair". Takt rejects Sagan's plan, as its extreme nature forgoes what music should truly be: a source of hope and happiness for the people. Meanwhile, Destiny manages to defeat Orpheus and joins Takt's side. Sagan realizes his mistake and accepts his fate, praising Takt's passion. Takt kills Sagan with Destiny's weapon, destroying him along the Black Night Siderite crystals and stopping the D2s in New York. Exhausted, Destiny and Takt lay together, as Takt hums the melody he had been composing, as Destiny listens, happy. As Takt dies, Destiny declares her love for him before sacrificing herself, reviving him. She reduces her essence to a pendant, which lays in his now restored arm. He is found unconscious by Lotte, who takes him to recuperate, finding no trace of Destiny, other than the small pendant on Takt's hand. Some time later, Christmas approaches and Anna has joined the Symphonica, which is being rebuilt along with the city while Takt recovers. D2 attacks persist in certain areas, as Musicarts continue to fend them off. Anna now wears Destiny's pendant, giving her the ability to transform into a Musicart herself and support Takt, carrying on Cosette and Destiny's wish of a world where he can create and play music.

=== Manga ===
A manga adaptation of Takt Op. Destiny, illustrated by Kino, began serialization in Media Factory's seinen manga magazine Monthly Comic Alive on August 26, 2022. Titled Takt Op. Destiny: Haruka Tsuioku no Anna – Harmony of Hope, the story is told from the viewpoint of the character Anna Schneider.

A prequel manga based on Takt Op. Symphony, written by Aya Takaha and illustrated by Ika Nakaya, began serialization on Media Factory's Comic Alive+ manga website on July 27, 2023. Titled Takt Op. Bara no Dangan (Kuchidzuke) de Utte!, the series follows the first Musicart "Ode to Joy".

==== Takt Op. Destiny: Haruka Tsuioku no Anna – Harmony of Hope ====
No.	Japanese release date	Japanese ISBN
1	June 28, 2023	978-4-04-682589-6

==== Takt Op. Bara no Dangan (Kuchidzuke) de Utte! ====
No.	Japanese release date	Japanese ISBN
1	February 28, 2024	978-4-04-811265-9
