= The Girl I Like Forgot Her Glasses =

Japanese manga series by Koume Fujichika

- First tankōbon volume cover, featuring Kaede Komura (left) and Ai Mie (right)

好きな子がめがねを忘れた (Suki na Ko ga Megane o Wasureta)
- Genre: Romantic comedy
- Manga
- Written by: Koume Fujichika
- Published by: Square Enix
- English publisher: NA: Comikey (digital) Square Enix (print)
- Imprint: Gangan Comics Joker
- Magazine: Monthly Gangan Joker
- Original run: November 22, 2018 – April 22, 2024
- Volumes: 12
- Anime television series
- Directed by: Susumu Kudo (Note: Credited as Chief Director (総監督, Sō Kantoku)); Katsumasa Yokomine
- Produced by: Hirofumi Nakanishi
- Written by: Tamazo Yanagi
- Music by: Jimmy Thumb P
- Studio: GoHands
- Licensed by: Crunchyroll (streaming); SA/SEA: Medialink
- Original network: Tokyo MX, MBS, BS Asahi
- Original run: July 4, 2023 – September 26, 2023
- Episodes: 13
- icon

The Girl I Like Forgot Her Glasses (好きな子がめがねを忘れた, Suki na Ko ga Megane o Wasureta) is a Japanese manga series written and illustrated by Koume Fujichika. The series was first published on Fujichika's Twitter account in April 2018, before being serialized in Square Enix's Monthly Gangan Joker magazine from November 2018 to April 2024. Its chapters were collected in twelve tankōbon volumes. An anime television series adaptation produced by GoHands aired from July to September 2023.

== Plot ==
As the deskmate of Ai Mie, shy school boy Kaede Komura always has his attention fixed on her. Attracted by her good looks and cute charms, all he wishes for is that she would look at him with those beautiful eyes beneath her glasses. But just a few days after making her acquaintance, Kaede notices something different about Ai: her eyes are squinting and her glasses are missing. Nonetheless, he still finds her adorable and beautiful.

Unexpectedly, Ai has a tendency to forget her glasses. Having terrible vision, she has difficulty going through her day at school. Thankfully, Kaede is more than willing to help her. As Ai starts relying on him, Kaede's feelings for her grow even more. Likewise, despite her short-sightedness, Kaede slowly becomes the person Ai always hopes to see.

== Characters ==
Kaede Komura (小村 楓, Komura Kaede)
Voiced by: Masahiro Itō, Marina Inoue (young)
Kaede is a shy, good-natured middle school boy who has been in love with Ai since the first day of school. But due to his fear of being rejected, he has a very difficult time trying to confess his feelings for her. He often daydreams about Ai, which causes him to lose concentration in school. He loves playing games, especially those at the arcade, and is willing to do anything to win Ai's heart. He becomes easily jealous whenever Ai interacts with other boys in school, most notably Ren Azuma, whom he sees as a rival for Ai's affection. Ai describes Kaede as kind and helpful like her father. Later on, it is revealed that he first met Ai at an ice cream shop when they were both 8 years old.
Ai Mie (三重 あい, Mie Ai)
Voiced by: Shion Wakayama
A popular but absentminded middle school girl and Kaede's crush, who always forgets her glasses. She can manage to get to school without her glasses thanks to her house being close to it. She sometimes speaks like a warrior, which her father passed onto her. She loves visiting the aquarium and learning about sea creatures. Whenever Ai forgets her glasses, she loses the perception of distance, and thus she tends to lean in close to Kaede in order to see his face clearly, making the boy blush. Initially, she was unaware of Kaede's crush on her, and only saw him as any other classmate, but once she starts to catch on, she opens up more to him and realizes she might be secretly developing feelings for him as well.
Ren Azuma (連 東, Azuma Ren)
Voiced by: Ryōhei Kimura
Kaede and Ai's handsome classmate. He is the popular kid at school and is aware of Kaede being in love with Ai. Due to his appearance and gentleness, he often receives confessions from girls, which he always kindly rejects, not wanting to be in a relationship with anyone. He sometimes tries to help Ai, only to unintentionally make Kaede jealous and view him as a rival. He is supportive of Ai and Kaede and will sometimes try to be a wingman for them, even though Ai remains mostly oblivious to Kaede's feelings.
Narumi Someya (染谷 成海, Someya Narumi)
Voiced by: Shino Shimoji
Kaede and Ai's classmate. She is a girl with pigtails who, on a few occasions, makes Ai feel jealous because either Kaede tries to help her or he accidentally gets too close to her, though Ai denies it every time.
Tomo Yasaka (八坂 智, Yasaka Tomo)
Voiced by: Yūsuke Kobayashi
One of Kaede's closest friends. Kaede is regularly caught staring at Ai by him.
Asuka Kawato (川戸 あすか, Kawato Asuka)
Voiced by: Aya Uchida
One of Ai's closest friends who is often seen going with her. She has a crush on Ren, even though he doesn't reciprocate at all.
Yuika Hibuchi (火渕 結衣花, Hibuchi Yuika)
Voiced by: Saki Miyashita
Kaede and Ai's classmate. She also has bad eyesight. On one occasion, she helps Ai with wearing contact lens in the sports festival.
Tokita (時田)
Voiced by: Kentaro Tone
Kaede and Ai's classmate. He wears a pair of glasses and has a chubby appearance. It's implied he may have a secret crush on Ai as well, but it's never made clear.
Ise (伊勢)
A former classmate of Ai. He used to steal her glasses when they were in elementary school.
Maho Tōyama (遠山 まほ, Tōyama Maho)
Voiced by: Minori Suzuki

== Media ==
=== Manga ===
The Girl I Like Forgot Her Glasses is written and illustrated by Koume Fujichika. Fujichika initially launched the series as a webcomic on their Twitter account on April 23, 2018. It was later serialized in Square Enix's Monthly Gangan Joker from November 22, 2018, to April 22, 2024. Square Enix has collected its chapters into twelve individual tankōbon volumes, with the first released on February 22, 2019, and the last on June 20, 2024. The series is licensed in English digitally by Comikey, and in print by Square Enix.

==== Volumes ====
No.	Original release date	Original ISBN	English release date	English ISBN
1	February 22, 2019	978-4-7575-6026-0	December 20, 2022	978-1-64609-179-9
Chapters 1–14; Bonus Chapter (描き下ろし, Kakioroshi)
2	June 22, 2019	978-4-7575-6169-4	February 28, 2023	978-1-64609-187-4
Chapters 15–28; Bonus Chapter (描き下ろし, Kakioroshi)
3	November 22, 2019	978-4-7575-6395-7	May 16, 2023	978-1-64609-188-1
Chapters 29–41; Bonus Chapter (描き下ろし, Kakioroshi)
4	February 22, 2020	978-4-7575-6531-9	July 18, 2023	978-1-64609-189-8
Chapters 42–50; Bonus Chapter 1 (描き下ろし ①, Kakioroshi 1); Bonus Chapter 2 (描き下ろし ②, Kakioroshi 2)
5	May 22, 2020	978-4-7575-6668-2	August 15, 2023	978-1-64609-190-4
Chapters 51–57; Bonus Chapter (描き下ろし, Kakioroshi)
6	October 22, 2020	978-4-7575-6911-9	October 10, 2023	978-1-64609-191-1
Chapters 58–68
7	April 22, 2021	978-4-7575-7208-9	December 5, 2023	978-1-64609-192-8
Chapters 69–74; Bonus Chapter 1 (描き下ろし ①, Kakioroshi 1); Bonus Chapter 2 (描き下ろし ②, Kakioroshi 2)
8	October 21, 2021	978-4-7575-7502-8 (regular); 978-4-7575-7503-5 (special)	February 13, 2024	978-1-64609-212-3
Chapters 75–81; Bonus Chapters (描き下ろし, Kakioroshi)
9	June 22, 2022	978-4-7575-7973-6 (regular); 978-4-7575-7974-3 (special)	April 16, 2024	978-1-64609-213-0
Chapters 82–88; Bonus Chapters (描き下ろし, Kakioroshi)
10	January 20, 2023	978-4-7575-8351-1	June 11, 2024	978-1-64609-253-6
Chapters 89–95
11	July 22, 2023	978-4-7575-8677-2 (regular); 978-4-7575-8678-9 (special)	August 13, 2024	978-1-64609-301-4
Chapters 96–101
12	June 20, 2024	978-4-7575-9167-7 (regular); 978-4-7575-9168-4 (special)	June 3, 2025	978-1-64609-385-4
Chapters 102–110

=== Anime ===
An anime television series adaptation was announced on January 13, 2023. It was produced by GoHands and directed by Katsumasa Yokomine, with chief direction by Susumu Kudo, scripts written by Tamazo Yanagi, character designs by Takayuki Uchida, and music composed by Jimmy Thumb P. The series aired from July 4 to September 26, 2023, on Tokyo MX and other networks. The opening theme song, "Name", was performed by Tsuzuri, while the ending theme song, "Megane Go Round", was performed by Masayoshi Ōishi along with Masahiro Itō and Shion Wakayama as "Masayoshi ga Megane wo Wasureta". Crunchyroll streamed the series. Medialink licensed the series in South, Southeast Asia and Oceania (except Australia and New Zealand) and is streaming it on the Ani-One Asia YouTube channel.

==== Episodes ====
No.	Title (Note: All English titles are taken from Crunchyroll.)	Directed by (Note: Information is taken from the ending credits of each episode.)	Written by	Storyboarded by	Original release date
1	"The Girl I Like Forgot Her Glasses"; Transliteration: "Suki na Ko ga Megane o Wasureta" (Japanese: 好きな子がめがねを忘れた)	Katsumasa Yokomine	Tamazo Yanagi	Katsuyuki Kodera; Shingo Suzuki	July 4, 2023
2	"The Girl I Like Asked Me Out"; Transliteration: "Suki na Ko ni Yobidasareta" (Japanese: 好きな子に呼び出された)	Shōhei Adachi	Tamazo Yanagi	Katsuyuki Kodera; Shingo Suzuki	July 11, 2023
3	"The Girl I Like Picked Up a Love Letter"; Transliteration: "Suki na Ko ga Rabu Retā o Hirotta" (Japanese: 好きな子がラブレターを拾った)	Shōhei Adachi	Tamazo Yanagi	Katsuyuki Kodera; Shingo Suzuki	July 18, 2023
4	"I Chose a Pair of Glasses for the Girl I Like"; Transliteration: "Suki na Ko no Megane o Eranda" (Japanese: 好きな子のめがねを選んだ)	Tetsuichi Yamagishi	Tamazo Yanagi	Katsuyuki Kodera; Shingo Suzuki	July 25, 2023
5	"I Met with the Girl I Like on Valentine's Day"; Transliteration: "Suki na Ko to Barentain Dē ni Atta" (Japanese: 好きな子とバレンタインデーに会った)	Tetsuichi Yamagishi	Tamazo Yanagi	Katsuyuki Kodera; Katsumasa Yokomine	August 1, 2023
6	"The Girl I Like and I Welcomed the New School Term"; Transliteration: "Suki na Ko to Shin Gakki o Mukaeta" (Japanese: 好きな子と新学期を迎えた)	Shōhei Adachi	Tamazo Yanagi	Katsuyuki Kodera; Katsumasa Yokomine	August 8, 2023
7	"I Brought Home the Girl I Like's Glasses"; Transliteration: "Suki na Ko no Megane o Motte Kaetta" (Japanese: 好きな子のめがねを持って帰った)	Shōhei Adachi	Tamazo Yanagi	Shingo Suzuki; Katsumasa Yokomine	August 15, 2023
8	"The Girl I Like and I Saw a Confession Together"; Transliteration: "Suki na Ko to Kokuhaku o Miteshimatta" (Japanese: 好きな子と告白を見てしまった)	Katsumasa Yokomine	Tamazo Yanagi	Katsuyuki Kodera; Katsumasa Yokomine	August 22, 2023
9	"I Went on a Field Trip with the Girl I Like"; Transliteration: "Suki na Ko to Kōgai Gakushū ni Itta" (Japanese: 好きな子と校外学習に行った)	Katsumasa Yokomine	Tamazo Yanagi	Katsuyuki Kodera; Katsumasa Yokomine	August 29, 2023
10	"The Girl I Like Had a Request"; Transliteration: "Suki na Ko ni Onegai Sareta" (Japanese: 好きな子にお願いされた)	Tetsuichi Yamagishi	Tamazo Yanagi	Katsuyuki Kodera; Katsumasa Yokomine	September 5, 2023
11	"On the Day of the Cultural Festival, The Girl I Like and I..."; Transliteration: "Suki na Ko to Bunkasai no Hi ni" (Japanese: 好きな子と文化祭の日に)	Tetsuichi Yamagishi	Tamazo Yanagi	Katsuyuki Kodera; Katsumasa Yokomine	September 12, 2023
12	"I Wanted to Practice Cooking with the Girl I Like"; Transliteration: "Suki na Ko to Chōri Jisshū Shitakatta" (Japanese: 好きな子と調理実習したかった)	Shōhei Adachi	Tamazo Yanagi	Katsuyuki Kodera; Katsumasa Yokomine	September 19, 2023
13	"The Girl I Like and I Made a Promise"; Transliteration: "Suki na Ko to Yakusoku o Shita" (Japanese: 好きな子と約束をした)	Shōhei Adachi	Tamazo Yanagi	Katsuyuki Kodera; Katsumasa Yokomine	September 26, 2023

== Reception ==
In 2019, the manga ranked twelfth in the print category of the Next Manga Awards out of 50 nominees.

By August 2023, the manga has over one million copies in circulation.

== See also ==
- I'm in Love with the Older Girl Next Door, another manga series by the same author
- Supervillain Boy, another manga series by the same author
