= Victoria of Many Faces =

Japanese light novel series

- First light novel volume cover featuring Nonna (left) and Chloe (right)

手札が多めのビクトリア (Tefuda ga Ōme no Bikutoria)
- Genre: Drama, fantasy
- Novel series
- Written by: Syuu
- Published by: Shōsetsuka ni Narō
- Original run: September 15, 2021 – November 8, 2021
- Novel series

Sequel
- Written by: Syuu
- Published by: Shōsetsuka ni Narō
- Original run: April 28, 2022 – present
- Light novel
- Written by: Syuu
- Illustrated by: Nanna Fujimi (vol. 1–2); Komo Ushino (vol. 3–)
- Published by: Media Factory
- English publisher: NA: Yen Press
- Imprint: MF Books
- Original run: July 25, 2022 – present
- Volumes: 4
- Manga
- Written by: Syuu
- Illustrated by: Komo Ushino
- Published by: Kadokawa Shoten
- English publisher: NA: Yen Press
- Imprint: Flos Comic
- Magazine: ComicWalker
- Original run: December 16, 2022 – present
- Volumes: 7
- Anime television series
- Directed by: Nobukage Kimura
- Produced by: Sachi Kawamoto; Yuzuru Saitou; Ryouta Tomizuka; Hideo Hirata; Masaharu Kado
- Written by: Naohiro Fukushima
- Music by: Moe Hyūga
- Studio: Studio Deen
- Licensed by: Crunchyroll; SEA: Medialink
- Original network: TXN (TV Tokyo), AT-X
- Original run: July 8, 2026 – present
- Episodes: 9
- icon

Victoria of Many Faces (Japanese: 手札が多めのビクトリア, Hepburn: Tefuda ga Ōme no Bikutoria) is a Japanese light novel series written by Syuu and illustrated by Nanna Fujimi. It was originally serialized on the user-generated novel publishing website Shōsetsuka ni Narō from September to November 2021, with a sequel serialized since April 2022. The series was later acquired by Media Factory and published under their MF Books imprint in July 2022. A manga adaptation illustrated by Komo Ushino began serialization on Kadokawa's ComicWalker website in December 2022. An anime television series adaptation produced by Studio Deen aired from July to September 2026. A second season and special episode have been announced.

== Synopsis ==
Chloe was a spy who served the Kingdom of Hagl using her top-notch skills in disguises and martial arts. After the betrayal of her boss, Chloe retires to civilian life living in the Kingdom of Ashbury and now goes by the name Victoria Sellers. She later adopts an abandoned girl named Nonna, and finds out that the skills she used as a spy can be applied to civilian life as well.

== Characters ==
Victoria Sellers (ビクトリア・セラーズ, Bikutoria Serāzu) / Chloe (クロエ, Kuroe) / Anna Dale (アンナ・デール, An'na Dēru)
Voiced by: Chika Anzai
Nonna (ノンナ)
Voiced by: Shion Wakayama
Jeffrey Asher (ジェフリー・アッシャー, Jefurī Asshā)
Voiced by: Yōhei Azakami
Lancome (ランコム, Rankomu)
Voiced by: Kenji Nojima
Edward Asher (エドワード・アッシャー, Edowādo Asshā)
Voiced by: Daisuke Ono
Yolana Haynes (ヨラナ・ヘインズ, Yorana Heinzu)
Voiced by: Saeko Akiho
Bernard Fitcher (バーナード・フィッチャー, Bānādo Ficchā)
Voiced by: Hiroshi Yanaka
Zaharo (ザハーロ, Zahāro)
Voiced by: Makoto Furukawa
Cedric Ashbury (セドリック・アシュベリー, Sedorikku Ashuberī)
Voiced by: Kensho Ono
Conrad Ashbury (コンラッド・アシュベリー, Konraddo Ashuberī)
Voiced by: Ryōta Ōsaka
Clark Anderson (クラーク・アンダーソン, Kurāku Andāson)
Voiced by: Megumi Han

== Media ==
=== Light novel ===
Written by Syuu, Victoria of Many Faces was originally serialized on the user-generated novel publishing website Shōsetsuka ni Narō from September 15 to November 8, 2021, with a sequel series in serialization since April 28, 2022. The series was later acquired by Media Factory and is published with illustrations by Nanna Fujimi under their MF Books light novel imprint on July 25, 2022, with Volumes 3 and onward including illustrations by Komo Ushino with Fujimi credited for character design. Four volumes have been released as of June 25, 2026.

During their panel at Sakura-Con 2024, Yen Press announced that they have licensed the series for English publication, with the first volume released in September 2024.

No.	Original release date	Original ISBN	North American release date	North American ISBN
1	July 25, 2022	978-4-04-681576-7	September 24, 2024	978-1-9753-9074-7
1. Prologue: "Carefully Laid Plans"; 2. Chapter 1: "When I Met the Girl"; 3. Chapter 2: "Lady Yolana and the Grumpy Old Historian"; 4. Chapter 3: "Our First Picnic"; 5. Interlude: "Lancome's Recollections"; 6. Chapter 4: "The Soiree"; 7. Interlude: "Jeffrey's Regret"; 8. Chapter 5: "The Incident at the Soiree"; 9. Chapter 6: "Peaceful Days"; 10. Chapter 7: "Nonna Home Alone"; 11. Chapter 8: "Victoria's Scars"; 12. Chapter 9: "A Baby-Pink Dress"; 13. Chapter 10: "Miles"; 14. Chapter 11: "Preparing to Leave the Kingdom"; 15. Interlude: "The Chef from Hagl"; 16. Chapter 12: "The Third Order of the Knights"; 17. Chapter 13: "Life on the Farm"; 18. Chapter 14: "Setting Sail"
2	December 23, 2022	978-4-04-681929-1	April 1, 2025	978-1-9753-9076-1
1. Prologue: "In the Kingdom of Shen"; 2. Chapter 1: "Homecoming and Reunions"; 3. Chapter 2: "The Lost Crown"; 4. Interlude: "Edward Asher's Hunch"; 5. Chapter 3: "Innermost Feelings"; 6. Chapter 4: "The Sybil Forest"; 7. Chapter 5: "My Pet Sibby"; 8. Interlude: "Edward's Paternal Instincts"; 9. Chapter 6: "Mother Superior Eliza and the Used Bookstore"; 10. Chapter 7: "A Peerage Ceremony and a Tea Party"; 11. Chapter 8: "An Old Contract"; 12. Chapter 9: "Beautiful Old Books"; 13. Chapter 10: "A Visit With Lady Yolana"; 14. Epilogue: "A Tea Party at the Asher Estate"; Bonus: "A Boy and His Mother"; Bonus: "Reed's Daily Life"; Bonus: "Blythe Asher's Daily Life"
3	January 25, 2024	978-4-04-683251-1	November 25, 2025	979-8-8554-0843-0
1. Prologue: "A Gentle Morning"; 2. Chapter 1: "Victoria's Peaceful Days"; 3. Interlude: "A Female Spy's Hesitations"; 4. Chapter 2: "A Request from the Third Order"; 5. Chapter 3: "Victoria at the Castle, Nonna Sent Away"; 6. Chapter 4: "The Truth and the Saint Floren Festival"; 7. Chapter 5: "Crossing the Line"; 8. Interlude: "Bernard and Nonna's Book Exchange"; 9. Chapter 6: "Royal Appointments"; 10. Chapter 7: "Nonna's Story"; 11. Epilogue: "Crown Princess Delphine's Thoughts"; Bonus: "Michael Anderson's Theory"; Bonus: "Miles's Wish"; Bonus: "The Asher Family's Long Ride"
4	June 25, 2026	978-4-04-660223-7	—	—

=== Manga ===
A manga adaptation illustrated by Komo Ushino began serialization on Kadokawa Corporation's ComicWalker website on December 16, 2022, with its chapters collected into seven tankōbon volumes as of July 2026.

During their panel at Anime NYC 2024, Yen Press announced that they have also licensed the manga for English publication.

No.	Original release date	Original ISBN	North American release date	North American ISBN
1	July 14, 2023	978-4-04-682496-7	February 18, 2025	979-8-8554-0546-0
Chapters 1–5; Bonus
2	February 17, 2024	978-4-04-683037-1	June 24, 2025	979-8-8554-1517-9
Chapters 6–10
3	September 17, 2024	978-4-04-683955-8	February 10, 2026	979-8-8554-2095-1
Chapters 11–15
4	March 17, 2025	978-4-04-684438-5	September 22, 2026	979-8-8554-2837-7
Chapters 16–20
5	September 17, 2025	978-4-04-685055-3	—	—
6	February 16, 2026	978-4-04-685749-1	—	—
7	July 17, 2026	978-4-04-660423-1	—	—

=== Anime ===
An anime television series adaptation was announced on September 12, 2025. It is produced by Studio Deen and directed by Nobukage Kimura, with Naohiro Fukushima supervising series scripts, Mina Ōsawa designing the characters, and Moe Hyūga composing the music. The series aired from July 8 to September 2, 2026, on TV Tokyo and its affiliates. (Note: TV Tokyo listed the series premiere on July 7 at 24:00, which is effectively July 8 at midnight JST.) The opening theme song is "Isshin" (一進; 'One Step'), performed by Haku, and the ending theme song is "En no Tsuki" (縁のつき), performed by KI_EN. Crunchyroll is streaming the series. Medialink licensed the series in Southeast Asia for streaming on Ani-One Asia's YouTube channel.

Following the airing of the final episode, a second season and special episode were announced.

==== Episodes ====
No.	Title	Directed by (Note: Production staff information is taken from the ending credits of each episode.)	Written by	Storyboarded by	Original release date
1	"Free, Unbound by Anyone"; Transliteration: "Dare ni mo Shibararezu Jiyū ni" (Japanese: 誰にも縛られず自由に)	Naoki Murata & Nobukage Kimura	Naohiro Fukushima	Nobukage Kimura	July 8, 2026
2	"No One Should Feel Sorry for Me"; Transliteration: "Kawaisō ja Nai no yo" (Japanese: 可哀想じゃないのよ)	Shunji Yoshida	Naohiro Fukushima	Satoji Funakubo	July 15, 2026
3	"I Couldn't Become Someone to Be Depended Upon"; Transliteration: "Tayorareru Sonzai ni Narenakatta" (Japanese: 頼られる存在になれなかった)	Yui Kamura	Minaka Sakamoto	Yui Kamura	July 22, 2026
4	"Are You Going to Arrest Me?"; Transliteration: "Watashi no Koto o Tsukamaemasu ka?" (Japanese: 私のことを捕まえますか？)	Shigeyasu Yamauchi	Takumi Fukaya	Shigeyasu Yamauchi	July 29, 2026
5	"Prepared to Pay for What I've Done"; Transliteration: "Itsuka Kono Mi ni Bachi ga Ataru Koto o" (Japanese: いつかこの身にバチが当たることを)	Masahiko Watanabe	Minaka Sakamoto	Osamu Yamasaki	August 5, 2026
6	"Think About This Child's Happiness"; Transliteration: "Kono Ko no Shiawase o Kangaete Yaranai to" (Japanese: この子の幸せを考えてやらないと)	Sun Rui Jie & Ze En	Takumi Fukaya	Hiroshi Matsuzono	August 12, 2026
7	"I Made Great Memories"; Transliteration: "Suteki na Omoide ga Dekita no wa" (Japanese: 素敵な思い出ができたのは)	Naoki Murata	Naohiro Fukushima	Kiyotaka Ōhata	August 19, 2026
8	"I Am Truly Thankful"; Transliteration: "Hontō ni Arigatō tte Omō no yo" (Japanese: 本当にありがとうって思うのよ)	Masahiko Watanabe	Minaka Sakamoto	Hiroyuki Fukushima	August 26, 2026
9	"No Matter What Happens in the Future"; Transliteration: "Kono Saki Nani ga Atte mo" (Japanese: この先何があっても)	Lee Ki-Seop & Nobukage Kimura	Naohiro Fukushima	Shigeyasu Yamauchi	September 2, 2026

=== Other ===
A promotional video was uploaded to the Kadokawa Anime YouTube channel on August 23, 2022. The video featured narration from Ami Koshimizu.

== Reception ==
The series was ranked ninth in the tankōbon category at the 2023 Next Light Novel Awards.

== See also ==
- Chō!!! Tensai Hatsumei Reijō no Powerful Ryōchi Kaikaku, a web novel series with the same writer
- Secrets of the Silent Witch, another light novel series with the same illustrator
