= Chō!!! Tensai Hatsumei Reijō no Powerful Ryōchi Kaikaku =

Japanese web novel series

- First tankōbon volume cover of the manga adaptation

超!!! 天才発明令嬢のパワフル領地改革 (Chō!!! Tensai Hatsumei Reijō no Pawafuru Ryōchi Kaikaku)
- Genre: Fantasy
- Novel series
- Written by: Syuu
- Published by: Shōsetsuka ni Narō
- Original run: September 22, 2020 – October 8, 2020
- Novel series

Sequel
- Written by: Syuu
- Published by: Shōsetsuka ni Narō
- Original run: November 8, 2020 – present
- Manga
- Written by: Syuu
- Illustrated by: Katoson
- Published by: Hobby Japan
- Imprint: HJ Comics
- Magazine: Comic Fire
- Original run: August 5, 2022 – present
- Volumes: 6

Chō!!! Tensai Hatsumei Reijō no Powerful Ryōchi Kaikaku (Japanese: 超!!! 天才発明令嬢のパワフル領地改革, Hepburn: Chō!!! Tensai Hatsumei Reijō no Pawafuru Ryōchi Kaikaku) is a Japanese web novel series written by Syuu. It was originally serialized on the online publication platform Shōsetsuka ni Narō from September to October 2020, before starting a sequel series on the same platform in November 2020. A manga adaptation illustrated by Katoson began serialization on Hobby Japan's Comic Fire web service in August 2022, with the series being compiled into six volumes as of April 2026.

== Plot ==
Marianne, a cheerful and optimistic girl, has often been unfairly compared to her older sister. Wanting to make a name for herself, and given her kind-hearted nature, she wants to help out others, particularly those in need. Her attitude and actions catch the attention of Alexandre, a prince who eventually falls in love with her. Eventually, Marianne and Alexandre marry, with Marianne having three children with him, although she continues her outgoing and inventive nature.

== Characters ==
Marianne (マリアンヌ, Mariannu)
A genius girl who has lived under the shadow of her older sister. She is known for her kind personality and wanting to help others. She is also a genius and loves inventing.
Alexandre (アレクサンドル, Arekusandoru)
A prince who falls in love Marianne. They later marry and have three children together.
Harold (ハロルド, Harorudo)
Marianne and Alexandre's eldest son.
Nicolas (ニコラス, Nikorasu)
Marianne and Alexandre's second son.
Flora (フローラ, Furōra)
Marianne and Alexadre's youngest daughter.

== Media ==
=== Web novel ===
Syuu originally serialized the series on the online publication platform Shōsetsuka ni Narō under the title Imōto wa Taitei Nikumareyaku (妹はたいてい憎まれ役) from September 22 to October 8, 2020; the series was later renamed after the manga adaptation began serialization. They later started a sequel series on the same platform on November 8, 2020, with 78 chapters released as of February 22, 2026.

=== Manga ===
A manga adaptation illustrated by Katoson began serialization on Hobby Japan's Comic Fire web service on August 5, 2022. The first tankōbon volume was released on March 1, 2023; six volumes have been released as of April 1, 2026.

No.	Release date	ISBN
1	March 1, 2023	978-4-7986-3101-1
2	June 1, 2023	978-4-7986-3199-8
3	December 1, 2023	978-4-7986-3362-6
4	June 3, 2024	978-4-7986-3547-7
5	May 1, 2025	978-4-7986-3717-4
6	April 1, 2026	978-4-7986-3918-5

== See also ==
- Victoria of Many Faces, a light novel series with the same writer
