= Gokudo =

Gokudō (極道), a Japanese word literally meaning "extreme path" or "wicked" and commonly used as a synonym for yakuza, may refer to:

- Gokudo the Adventurer (1991), Japanese light novel series by Usagi Nakamura
- Gokudō Meshi (2006), Japanese manga series by Shigeru Tsuchiyama
- Gokudō Parasites (2019), Japanese manga series by Ume Matsutake and Lee Brocco
- Yakuza Wives (1986), Japanese film that spawned 15 sequels, known in Japan as Gokudō no Onna-tachi
- Fudoh: The New Generation (1996), Japanese film by Takashi Miike, known in Japan as Gokudō Sengokushi: Fudō
- Rainy Dog (1997), Japanese film by Takashi Miike, known in Japan as Gokudō Kuroshakai
- Gozu (2003), Japanese film by Takashi Miike, known in Japan as Gokudō Kyōfu dai-Gekijō
- Yakuza Weapon (2011), Japanese film by Tak Sakaguchi and Yūdai Yamaguchi, known in Japan as Gokudō Heiki
- The Raid 2 (2014), Indonesian film directed by Welsh filmmaker Gareth Evans, released in Japan as The Raid: Gokudo
- Yakuza Apocalypse (2015), Japanese film by Takashi Miike, known in Japan as Gokudō Daisensō
- Ninja vs. Gokudo (2021), Japanese manga series by Shinsuke Kondō
