= The Exiled Heavy Knight Knows How to Game the System =

Japanese light novel series

- First light novel volume cover, featuring Elymas Edvaughn (left) and Ruche Luvis (right)

追放された転生重騎士はゲーム知識で無双する (Tsuihō Sareta Tensei Jū Kishi wa Gēmu Chishiki de Musō Suru)
- Genre: Adventure, fantasy, isekai
- Novel series
- Written by: Nekoko
- Published by: Shōsetsuka ni Narō
- Original run: April 25, 2021 – present
- Light novel
- Written by: Nekoko
- Illustrated by: Jaian
- Published by: Kodansha
- Imprint: Kodansha Ranobe Books
- Original run: June 2, 2022 – present
- Volumes: 5
- Manga
- Written by: Nekoko
- Illustrated by: Lee Brocco
- Published by: Kodansha
- English publisher: Kodansha (digital): NA: Seven Seas Entertainment
- Imprint: Young Magazine KC
- Magazine: YanMaga Web; (February 11, 2022 – July 19, 2024); Weekly Young Magazine; (September 9, 2024 – present)
- Original run: February 11, 2022 – present
- Volumes: 19
- Anime television series
- Directed by: Shingo Suzuki (chief); Tetsuichi Yamagishi (chief); Katsumasa Yokomine
- Music by: Ludvig Forssell
- Studio: GoHands
- Licensed by: Crunchyroll: SA/SEA: Muse Communication
- Original network: JNN (MBS, TBS); AT-X, BS NTV
- Original run: July 3, 2026 – present
- Episodes: 20

The Exiled Heavy Knight Knows How to Game the System (Japanese: 追放された転生重騎士はゲーム知識で無双する, Hepburn: Tsuihō Sareta Tensei Jū Kishi wa Gēmu Chishiki de Musō Suru) is a Japanese light novel series written by Nekoko and illustrated by Jaian. It initially began serialization on the user-generated novel publishing website Shōsetsuka ni Narō in April 2021, before later acquired and published by Kodansha under their Kodansha Ranobe Books light novel imprint in June 2022. A manga adaptation illustrated by Lee Brocco began serialization on Kodansha's YanMaga Web manga website and app in February 2022, before being transferred to the Weekly Young Magazine in September 2024. An anime television series adaptation produced by GoHands premiered in July 2026.

== Plot ==
Elymas Edvan is a fifteen-year-old born into a prestigious family, one that is renowned for producing Master Swordsmen. During the Ritual of Divine Blessing, which determines an individual's class, Elymas manifests the Heavy Knight class, one widely regarded as defective. As a result, he is stripped of his status as heir to the Edvan household and cast into exile. The Heavy Knight class is known for its unbalanced and seemingly useless skills, leading society to view Elymas as a failure.

Elymas realizes that the world he inhabits is identical to a game he played in a previous life. In this game, the Heavy Knight is actually the strongest class when used correctly. Drawing on his prior knowledge of the game's mechanics, Elymas begins his journey as an adventurer, developing his abilities in ways others consider impossible. As Elymas travels, he steadily accumulates power while remaining officially classified as a "weak" class, confounding adventurers, nobles, and institutions that rely on surface-level distinctions.

== Characters ==
Elymas Edvaughn (エルマ・エドヴァン, Eruma Edovan)
Voiced by: Takeo Ōtsuka (Japanese); Van Barr Jr. (English)
Ruche Luvis (ルーチェ・ルービス, Rūche Rūbisu)
Voiced by: Shion Wakayama (Japanese); Kiane Chula King (English)
Malice Edvanghn (マリス・エドヴァン, Marisu Edovan)
Voiced by: Natsuko Abe (Japanese); Katie Caruso (English)
Kelt (ケルト, Keruto)
Voiced by: Kōsuke Tanabe
Maebel (メアベル, Meaberu)
Voiced by: Tsugumi Sakuragi
Hilde (ヒルデ, Hirude)
Voiced by: Misaki Kuno
Carlos (カロス, Karosu)
Voiced by: Kengo Kawanishi

== Media ==
=== Light novel ===
Written by Nekoko, The Exiled Heavy Knight Knows How to Game the System initially began serialization on the user-generated novel publishing website Shōsetsuka ni Narō on April 25, 2021. The series was later acquired and published by Kodansha with illustrations by Jaian under their Kodansha Ranobe Books light novel imprint on June 2, 2022, with five volumes released as of July 2026.

No.	Release date	ISBN
1	June 2, 2022	978-4-06-527822-2
2	April 1, 2023	978-4-06-531646-7
3	February 2, 2024	978-4-06-534769-0
4	December 26, 2025	978-4-06-541272-5
5	July 2, 2026	978-4-06-543614-1

=== Manga ===
A manga adaptation illustrated by Lee Brocco began serialization on Kodansha's YanMaga Web manga website and app on February 11, 2022, which was later transferred to the Weekly Young Magazine on September 9, 2024, with its chapters compiled into nineteen tankōbon volumes as of October 2026.

The manga's chapters are published in English on Kodansha's "K Manga" app. In July 2025, Seven Seas Entertainment announced that they had licensed the manga for English publication.

No.	Original release date	Original ISBN	English release date	English ISBN
1	June 6, 2022	978-4-06-528143-7	June 2, 2026	979-8-89765-669-1
Chapters 1–9
2	August 19, 2022	978-4-06-528804-7	June 2, 2026	979-8-89765-669-1
Chapters 10–18
3	November 18, 2022	978-4-06-529810-7	September 22, 2026	979-8-89765-670-7
Chapters 19–27
4	February 6, 2023	978-4-06-530715-1	September 22, 2026	979-8-89765-670-7
Chapters 28–36
5	April 20, 2023	978-4-06-531392-3	January 19, 2027	979-8-89765-671-4
6	July 20, 2023	978-4-06-532366-3	January 19, 2027	979-8-89765-671-4
7	October 19, 2023	978-4-06-533609-0	May 18, 2027	979-8-89863-095-9
8	December 20, 2023	978-4-06-534021-9	May 18, 2027	979-8-89863-095-9
9	March 18, 2024	978-4-06-534932-8	—	—
10	June 19, 2024	978-4-06-535606-7	—	—
11	September 5, 2024	978-4-06-536878-7	—	—
12	December 6, 2024	978-4-06-537904-2	—	—
13	March 6, 2025	978-4-06-538912-6	—	—
14	June 6, 2025	978-4-06-539940-8	—	—
15	October 6, 2025	978-4-06-541136-0	—	—
16	January 6, 2026	978-4-06-542132-1	—	—
17	April 6, 2026	978-4-06-543197-9	—	—
18	July 6, 2026	978-4-06-544239-5	—	—
19	October 6, 2026	978-4-06-545204-2	—	—

=== Anime ===
An anime television series adaptation was announced on September 5, 2024. It is produced by GoHands and directed by Katsumasa Yokomine, with Shingo Suzuki and Tetsuichi Yamagishi serving as chief directors, Takayuki Uchida designing the characters, and Ludvig Forssell composing the music. The series premiered on July 3, 2026, on the Super Animeism Turbo programming block on all JNN affiliates, including MBS and TBS, running for two consecutive cours total of 26 episodes. (Note: MBS and TBS listed the series premiere on July 2 at 24:26, which is effectively July 3 at 12:26 a.m. JST.)

For the first cours (comprising episodes 1 to 13), the opening theme song is "Awake", performed by Spyair, while the ending theme song is "Lv. 1 Shokugyō: Ningen" (Lv.1 職業：人間; Level 1 Occupation: Human), performed by Reona. For the second cours (from episode 14 onwards), the opening theme song is "Rewrite the Answer", performed by Tokoyami Towa, while the ending theme song is "Contemporary Dance" (コンテンポラリーダンス), performed by PompadollS.

Crunchyroll is streaming the series. Muse Communication licensed the series in South and Southeast Asia.

==== Episodes ====
No.	Title	Directed by (Note: Production staff information is taken from the ending credits of each episode.)	Storyboard by	Original release date
1	"I'm Elymas the Heavy Knight"; Transliteration: "Jū Kishi Eruma" (Japanese: 重騎士エルマ)	Katsumasa Yokomine	Shingo Suzuki (AD)	July 3, 2026
As heir to the Edvaughn family, Elymas undergoes the Ritual of Divine Blessing to determine his warrior class. During the ritual, Elymas recalls a previous life in which the world he currently inhabits is actually the game Magic World, which he played obsessively. The ritual concludes and he is thrilled to be granted his favourite class, Heavy Knight, with which he has had much success. Unfortunately, in this world Heavy Knight is considered a defective defensive class that deals very little damage and is deemed worthless. Malice, a cruel and scheming daughter of an Edvaughn branch family, undergoes the same ritual and is granted the class Master Swordsman. Without hesitation, Elymas' father adopts Malice as family heir and disinherits Elymas. Despite this initial setback, Elymas knows with the correct application of skill points, Heavy Knight can become the most overpowered, unbeatable class in the world. Using the pittance his father gave him, Elymas acquires adventuring equipment and heads into the wilderness. There, he encounters another adventurer running from Raana Frogs, of which Elymas defeats dozens at once by taking advantage of his existing skills and boosted equipment stats. Abandoning the Edvaughn name, he styles himself Elymas the Heavy Knight.
2	"Menacing Foul Eight-Legged Beast"; Transliteration: "Kyōi no Saru Kumo" (Japanese: 脅威の猿蜘蛛)	Tetsuichi Yamagishi	Shingo Suzuki	July 10, 2026 (Note: Due to the broadcast of the 2026 FIVB Women's Volleyball Nations League, this episode aired at 1:11 a.m. JST, 45 minutes after the regular air time on MBS.)
By using his Rampart Reflection skill to defeat the Raana, Elymas leaps from Level 2 to 8 and earns the title "Unwavering One." He rejects a party offer from Arus, the adventurer he rescued, to avoid sharing EXP and slowing his progress. Arus stays and becomes a liability when a Level 16 Ariandype Spider attacks. Because Rampart Reflection fails against enemies whose attack exceeds Elymas's defence, Elymas uses seven skill points gained from the Raana to upgrade his Heavy Armour skill. This unlocks Disarm, a skill that reduces enemy damage. After buffing himself and landing multiple hits, Elymas reduces the spider's damage by 40%, successfully triggering Rampart Reflection. The spider is defeated, raising Elymas to Level 12 and boosting his Heavy Armour to Level 15, which unlocks the Parry skill. Though victorious, Elymas is poisoned and must rely on Arus to get back to town. Once recovered, he registers at the Rondalm Guild as an F-Rank adventurer, needing an E-Rank promotion to further level up his Heavy Armour skill. Despite facing initial scorn as a Heavy Knight, he draws attention by selling the spider's magic stone and demanding a promotion quest. He is placed into a Raid Quest, but meeting his teammates makes him uneasy.
3	"The Raid Quest"; Transliteration: "Reido Kuesuto" (Japanese: 大規模依頼(レイドクエスト))	Tetsuichi Yamagishi	Shingo Suzuki	July 17, 2026 (Note: Due to the broadcast of the 2026 FIVB Women's Volleyball Nations League, this episode aired at 1:21 a.m. JST, 55 minutes after the regular air time on MBS.)
Quest overseer Gowtan is not pleased by Elymas' presence, so Elymas makes effort to be extra polite to him. Fellow examinee Teal the Red Mage attempts to mock Elymas and is irritated Elymas ignores him. Gowtan reveals a cemetery is overrun by ghouls and a Level 30 Ghoul Head, which he will eliminate while they handle the ghouls. Elymas realises most examinees are cowards, a few like Teal and Paul are arrogant, and Gowtan is careless, so the odds are high some of them are going to die. He politely asks Gowtan for more detailed instructions, which Gowtan grudgingly agrees to, only for Teal to interrupt by claiming cowards can simply hide behind him during the battle. Ghouls suddenly appear from underground, having surrounded them already. Gowtan, Teal and Paul rush towards Ghoul Head, while Elymas takes command of the panicking examinees and organises a proper strategy. Using Parry, Disarm and Rampart Reflection, Elymas destroys most of the ghouls and creates openings for the examinees to safely kill the few survivors. He also reaches Level 16 during the battle. Teal and Paul panic, unable to draw the ghouls away from Gowtan, providing chances for Ghoul head to heal by eating the other ghouls. After eating several dozen, it suddenly evolves into a Level 40 Mad Headder.
4	"Existence Evolution"; Transliteration: "Sonzai Shinka" (Japanese: 存在進化)	Shohei Adachi	Katsumasa Yokomine	July 24, 2026
Elymas identifies the Headder's transformation as Existence Evolution, a rare event where monsters evolve into higher species. With Gowtan paralyzed for three minutes and Teal and Paul hiding in fear, Elymas distracts Mad Headder alone. To survive the level gap, Elymas spends his saved skill points to upgrade Beginner Swordsmanship, unlocking the high-damage skill Vital Slice. Once the three minutes elapse, a recovered Gowtan strikes Mad Headder from behind, which combined with the damage already dealt by Elymas, splits its skull open. Defeating it together boosts Elymas from Level 16 to 23. Gowtan concedes his own leadership was lacking and rewards Elymas with the loot: a Level 40 magic stone and the Daemonsrage Shield. He also approves Elymas' promotion while rejecting Teal's for cowardice. At the guild, Elymas collects a total of 930,000 gold for the quest, the ghouls magic stones and the Headder's stone. When envious adventurers accuse him of cheating, Gowtan publicly vouches for Elymas victory and swears to fight the next man who accuses him of cheating. Realizing he spent his skill points carelessly in the battle, Elymas sets his sights on acquiring the Fang of Smoldering Insanity skillbook. Combined with a fully upgraded Oath of Heavy Armour, it will turn his defective Heavy Knight class into an unstoppable living weapon.
5	"Fang of Smouldering Insanity"; Transliteration: "Iburi Kurū Kiba" (Japanese: 燻り狂う牙)	Shohei Adachi	Katsumasa Yokomine	July 31, 2026
Elymas is shocked to learn that buying and selling skillbooks is illegal, unlike in the game, and looted books must be donated to nobles or the church. Realizing the skillbook he needs is likely sitting in his father's mansion, he feels ashamed of his own past noble arrogance. A shopkeeper points him toward black-market scavenger shops selling items looted from dead adventurers. At the first shop, the scavenger has the Fang of Smoldering Insanity. After Elymas begs her to reserve it for him, she agrees but raises the price from 50 to 55 million gold. Realizing he needs a party to earn that kind of money, Elymas overhears the swordsman Cline and thief Reiss firing their pierrot, Ruche. Eavesdropping, Elymas learns they deliberately gave her terrible advice on assigning her skill points so Cline could loot a rare sword he wanted, then used her lack of combat skills to withhold her pay. However, Elymas recognizes that Ruche must have maxed out a specific skill tree, one nearly as useful as his fully upgraded Heavy Knight, which the foolish Cline has overlooked in favour of just looting his desired sword. Desperate for a capable ally, he immediately asks Ruche to join his party.
6	"Ruche the Pierrot"; Transliteration: "Dōkeshi Rūche" (Japanese: 道化師ルーチェ)	Shingo Suzuki & Tetsuichi Yamagishi	Katsumasa Yokomine	August 7, 2026
Cline agrees to transfer Ruche to Elymas, ignoring Reiss's suspicion that Elymas' interest in her might mean Ruche possesses hidden value they did not know about. Viewing the Heavy Knight as simply desperate for party members, Cline releases Ruche to protect their party's reputation, spitefully tossing a meager 100,000-gold onto the ground as her final wage. Elymas stops Ruche from taking the money to ensure a clean break from Cline and Reiss. Though Ruche initially assumes Elymas recruited her as a lover, she is shocked when he correctly identifies that Cline forced her to max out the "Lady Luck" skill. Despite her sole attack skill relying entirely on a dice roll, Elymas takes her to the Angel's Playbox dungeon, aiming for her to reach Level 30 and earn 30 million gold in a single run. They begin on the upper floors targeting Level 20 monsters until Ruche reaches Level 20. Noticing extraordinarily frequent item drops, Elymas realizes Ruche also possesses the "Cat's Paw" skill, which boosts drop rates by 500%. Because levelling up requires defeating monsters of higher levels than yourself, they leave the upper floors with the level 20 monsters behind and venture deeper in search of the Golden Raana Frog.
7	"Golden Raana Farming"; Transliteration: "Narikin Rāna Kari" (Japanese: 成金ラーナ狩り)	Tetsuichi Yamagishi	Katsumasa Yokomine	August 14, 2026
Elymas claims Golden Raana have low health and attack damage alongside valuable drops, but Ruche counters that they are notoriously resilient and lure adventurers towards other more dangerous monsters. Elymas realizes this is another way the real world and the game world are different. To adapt, he has Ruche invest her new skill points into Fool's Acrobatics to unlock two essential abilities. Shortly after, they spot a Golden Raana. Knowing it flees if approached within four meters, Ruche uses her new Acrobatic Amble to run along the ceiling and drop ahead of it, steering the Raana back toward Elymas. Using light from a healing crystal to stretch the Raana's shadow, Elymas pins it in place with Shadow Stomp. Since the Raana still boasts high defence, Ruche attacks with her Ironpiercer Dagger and the skill Dice Thrust. She rolls a six on her first attempt, granting a 1.95x damage multiplier, ignoring 65% of the Raana's defence, and landing guaranteed critical hits. The single strike instantly kills the Raana, levelling Ruche up to 27 and Elymas to 30. Better yet, it drops the item Elymas was hoping for, the Dazzling Raana Decorative Blade, worth 17 million gold.
8	"Wandering"; Transliteration: "Wandaringu" (Japanese: 王の彷徨(ワンダリング))	Katsumasa Yokomine	Katsumasa Yokomine	August 21, 2026
Determined to retrieve another valuable blade, Elymas hunts more Raana, successfully looting one three hours later. This victory pushes Elymas to level 33 and Ruche to level 31. As they prepare to exit, Ruche hears a baby crying, a sign the dungeon's Dreamlord has left its nest to start Wandering. Elymas tries to avoid it, but two severely injured adventurers appear, forcing him to hold the hallway so they and Ruche can escape. Three level 40 Tin Knights emerge. Ruche insists on fighting, but Elymas reveals they are merely high-level minions and the Dreamlord is close behind. To force the stubborn Ruche to run, Elymas cruelly yells that she is useless dead weight. The level 50 Dreamlord Embryo arrives. Despite its surprisingly low stats, it can only be damaged by ranged attacks targeting its giant eye. Elymas rapidly upgrades Oath of Heavy Armour to unlock Shield Bash and destroys one Tin Knight, but is stunned when Embryo heals it. Worse, the Knights begin learning from his attacks, a mechanic they did not have in the game world. Incapacitated by Embryo's Stun effect, Elymas accepts his impending death, only for Ruche to reappear at the last second.
9	"Dreamlord"; Transliteration: "Masutā" (Japanese: 夢の主(マスター))	Katsumasa Yokomine	Katsumasa Yokomine	August 28, 2026
Ruche is furious Elymas fought instead of only delaying Embryo before escaping with her. Insisting on staying by his side, her bravery inspires Elymas to fight together. Because Embryo adapts after seeing an attack once, Elymas's one ranged attack is now useless. Their only option requires Elymas to launch Ruche with Shield Bash so she can target Embryo's eye using Dice Thrust, hoping to roll a 6. Unfortunately, she rolls a 4 and misses. Facing death, Ruche surprises Elymas by using Acrobatic Amble to sprint across the ceiling, get behind Embryo, and trigger Dice Thrust again. Counted as a new attack, Embryo cannot avoid it. Ruche rolls a 6, plunging her blade through its skull into its eye from behind, killing Embryo and the Tin Knights. The victory earns them over 2,000 EXP, raising Ruche to Level 39 and Elymas to 41. Elymas realizes Ruche's true value lies in her unwavering perseverance. Defeating a boss over 30% higher in level grants them "The Upsetter" title, boosting attack and speed against all enemies of higher levels. They net over 60 million gold in loot, including three Tin Knight swords and an Intermediate Wind Magic skill book. As the dungeon collapses, they are safely teleported to the surface.
10	"Negotiation"; Transliteration: "Kōshō" (Japanese: 交渉)	Tetsuichi Yamagishi	Katsumasa Yokomine	September 4, 2026
Without Ruche's Lady Luck skill, Cline and Reiss struggle to collect monster loot. Arriving at the guild, they watch Elymas and Ruche receive recognition for defeating the Dreamlord and closing the Angel's Playbox dungeon. Closing the dungeon awards both Elymas and Ruche a Rank D promotion and a 10-million-gold bounty. Furious that Elymas tricked him into surrendering Ruche, a desperate Cline grovels for her return. Ruche ignores him completely, mortifying both Cline and Reiss before the entire guild. Ruche commits to remaining in Elymas' party and decides to sell the wind skillbook. Their total loot reaches 57 million gold. Elymas attempts to give Ruche 46 million of it, but she furiously demands he take a fairer share. Unable to agree on how to share the gold, they head to the Witch's shop to haggle over selling the Raana blades, Tin Knight swords, and wind skillbook. Terrified by their hostile and vicious bargaining, Ruche panics and proposes trading everything directly for the Fang of Smoldering Insanity. Both agree it is a great deal, though they sulk over her interrupting their enjoyable argument. Meanwhile, Malice murders imprisoned adventurers for massive EXP gains, obsessed with surpassing Elymas.
11	"Inescapable Past"; Transliteration: "Nogarerarenai Kako" (Japanese: 逃れられない過去)	Tetsuichi Yamagishi	Katsumasa Yokomine	September 11, 2026
Furious at Elymas' sudden success, his father Aizas suspects he is using the Edvaughn name to blackmail the guild for unearned promotions. Influenced by Malice, Aizas confronts Elymas at the guild directly. Elymas denies the accusations, prompting Malice to challenge him to a duel to test his actual abilities. Though Elymas knows he is at a severe disadvantage against the Level 45 Master Swordsman, since his Smoldering Insanity/Heavy Knight combination isn't levelled yet, he accepts the duel. However, he demands if he wins, Aizas must leave him alone forever. Initially, Malice confidently toys with Elymas, wiping out 40% of his health. However, capitalizing on her overconfidence, Elymas traps her in place with Shadow Stomp and lands a critical hit, infuriating Aizas, who believes a Heavy Knight should be no match for a Master Swordsman. Driven mad by the blow, Malice retaliates with a high-speed skill, moving faster than lightning to deliver a devastating critical hit back to Elymas.
12	"Malice the Master Swordsman"; Transliteration: "Kensei Marisu" (Japanese: 剣聖マリス)	Daichi Muroi	Katsumasa Yokomine	September 18, 2026
Suffering severe blood loss, Elymas collapses as Malice gloats. However, Elymas reveals he was strategically waiting for three conditions: Malice using her lightning speed, identifying her weak point, and his health dropping below 40%. With all three met, he upgrades Smouldering Insanity to Level 5 and gains Dragonrage Deathgaze, which doubles speed and damage below 20% health. Using Life Shield, he drops his health to 18%, triggering Dragonrage and boosting his stats past Malice's. Forced onto the defensive, a desperate Malice attacks with her lightning speed again, but Elymas disarms her and Shield Bashes her into a wall, knocking her unconscious. Stunned, Aizas admits Elymas earned his guild promotions through skill rather than the Edvaughn name. Before departing with Malice, Elymas thanks Aizas for raising him honourably. Ruche urges Aizas to apologize before they never see each other again, but Aizas refuses, asking Ruche to watch over his son instead. Elymas explains to Ruche Aizas's noble status prevented him from apologizing to a commoner without ruining his political reputation, so asking Ruche to look after him was the only way Aizas could offer Elymas encouragement. Expecting Malice to seek revenge, they leave Rondalm for good and arrive days later in Lacoryna, the City of Adventurers.
13	"Lacoryna, City of Adventurers"; Transliteration: "Bōkensha no To Rakorina" (Japanese: 冒険者の都ラコリナ)	Daichi Muroi	Katsumasa Yokomine	September 25, 2026 (Note: This episode aired at 12:56 a.m. JST, 30 minutes after the regular air time on MBS.)
Elymas explains Lacoryna dwarfs Rondalm because nearby dungeons draw countless mid-level adventurers. Seeking maximum damage, Ruche invests points into Lady Luck, evolving her Cat's Paw skill into Angel of Blessing for increased odds of finding valuable loot. Elymas suggests she acquire the Grim Reaper's Grip skillbook next, despite its 100-million gold price tag, double that of Smoldering Insanity. To upgrade her equipment, they enter the Level 60 Centipede's Gallery dungeon targeting Smiley monsters, which drop Blacksteel weapons. Though Ruche panics when a Level 45 Smiley appears, matching Malice's strength, Elymas easily traps it using Shield Bash and Shadow Stomp. Ruche's critical hits quickly finish it, dropping an earth magic stone and a Blacksteel knife to replace her Ironpiercer dagger. Capitalizing on the easy loot, Elymas decides to farm ten Smileys. A swarm of four appears, including a rare Frowny, credited to Ruche's Lady Luck skill. After defeating them, they gain a Blacksteel hammer, an ingot, a sword for Elymas, and a Destruction Runestone worth 20 million gold that boosts weapon damage by 30%. Ruche nearly faints realizing they collected 41.5-million gold in under an hour. A rare monster awakens deeper in the dungeon.
14	"Mythril Giant"; Transliteration: "Magin no Kyojin" (Japanese: 魔銀の巨人)	Unknown	TBA	October 2, 2026
Deducing the nearby monster is a rare Mythril Golem, Elymas and Ruche decide to hunt it for its valuable crafting materials. Luring the massive golem into a narrow tunnel to restrict its movement, Elymas warns Ruche that even his Heavy Knight defence can only endure two hits. However, he explains that golems are vulnerable to critical damage, meaning Ruche could kill it with two stabs if she rolls a six on two Dice Thrusts with her new Blacksteel knife. Elymas distracts the golem with Parries and Shield Bashes until Ruche lands a critical hit, halving its health. When the golem counterattacks, Elymas binds it with Shadow Stomp. Ruche attempts a second Dice Thrust but rolls a 3 and misses. Elymas chains Life Shield, Shadow Stomp, and Shield Bash to suppress the golem’s auto-healing. After Ruche rolls a 4 and misses again, Elymas absorbs a direct blow that nearly kills him. Finally, Ruche rolls a 6, piercing the golem and killing it. The victory pushes Ruche to Level 47 and Elymas to Level 49. After looting mithril ingots and skill points, a confident Elymas immediately sets their sights on the dungeon’s Dreamlord, citing its easily exploitable weakness.
15	"Dreamlord of the Dreamhole"	Unknown	TBA	October 9, 2026
The Golem yields a magic stone worth 2 million and a mithril ingot worth 25 million. Elymas secretly plans to turn it into a mithril knife for Ruche. Ruche levels up Fool's Acrobatics and gains the skill Multi-hit Acrobatics. The Dreamlord, Rock Centipede's weakness is revealed to be a blind spot behind its head where it cannot defend itself or counterattack. Once Ruche makes it onto Centipede's back, she defeats it with only two Multi-hit attacks, without needing Dice Roll or critical damage. Ruche celebrates, but the Centipede corpse begins emitting burning steam, so Elymas realises it is still alive and going through Existence Evolution. Elymas is confused, as Rock Centipedes only Evolve after eating so many magic stones and dead adventurers, so the Centipede should not have had enough time as the dungeon only appeared a few weeks ago. The only explanation is someone caused Evolution by feeding it stones and corpses. Centipede Evolves into Rock Amude, which would require at least 4 successful Dice Rolls to kill. Unable to escape, Elymas decides to use a dangerous Heavy Knight attack that was so risky but overpowered that Magic World players unofficially called it the Balance Breaker.
16	"No Defence Spared"	Unknown	TBA	October 16, 2026
Elymas uses Shield Bash to launch Ruche into Amude's blind spot. Elymas uses Life Shield to drop his health and activate Dragonrage Deathgaze, then provokes Amude into chasing him so it crashes into the walls and damages itself. Elymas is able to Shield Bash it, but he only survives thanks to Ruche successful Dice Thrust onto its unarmoured tail, causing Critical Damage. When Amude turns to chase Ruche, Elymas directs her to run in a circle around a boulder, then leap to safety, causing Amude to wrap itself around the boulder and accidentally bite its own tail. Elymas upgrades Smoldering Insanity to level 15 and gains the skill No Defence Spared, converting all his defence points into attack. As Heavy Knights have the most defence points of any class, the move became known as Balance Breaker, as it allows Heavy Knights with low attack damage to deal the highest damage of any class on one attack, as the damage also stacks with the plus 100% damage of Dragonrage Deathgaze and the Upsetter skill. With this one attack, Amude's head is severed and Elymas reaches level 62. Having seen Existence Evolution multiple times in a short period, Elymas decides to speak to the local Guildmaster.
17	"Guildmaster Haillen"	Unknown	TBA	October 23, 2026
Elymas and Ruche both receive the title Nightmare Neutraliser for defeating an Existence Evolved Dreamlord, giving them plus 7% attack against all Dreamlords. After collecting its magic stone they visit the guild, where the rude, snobby secretary Matilda refuses to let unknown D rank adventurers walk in and talk to the guild master. She also doubts they could have anything important enough to warrant the guild master paying them any attention. Accustomed to dealing with nobles even more arrogant than her, Elymas merely reveals the magic stones of the Amude and the Mythril Golem, after which Matilda becomes instantly more respectful. Guild master Hailenn is both intelligent and intimidating, deducing almost everything about Elymas from a short conversation, including his identity as a former noble. Elymas meanwhile realises Hailenn is related to the Howlroddes family that has ruled Lacoryna for generations, making her more influential than a normal guild master. Elymas fears he made a mistake talking to her, as the Howlroddes would have the arrogance and assets to make the Rock Centipede Existence Evolve unnaturally quickly. As he takes too long thinking all this through, including whether she can actually read his thoughts, Hailenn becomes irritated at his long silence and accuses him of making up a grand story to try and manipulate her, which he is now too nervous to go ahead with.
18	"Blacksmith Veruga"	TBA	TBA	October 30, 2026
Elymas delivers his report and prepares to leave, but Hailenn panics upon learning a Death Amude has appeared, realizing local adventurers are too weak to handle it. Recognizing her shock is genuine, Elymas decides she was not behind the Amude's forced Evolution and reveals they already killed the creature and sold its stone to Matilda. Ruche finds Hailenn surprisingly cute beneath her arrogant guild master facade. After confirming the stone's authenticity, Hailenn insists on promoting Elymas and Ruche to B-rank and offers them employment under the Howlrodde family. Elymas declines the job offer, but Hailenn gives them the rank promotion anyway. Elymas has Ruche equip a venomous Chilopoda Dagger dropped by the Amude, which synergizes well with her Lady Luck. Needing a high-level blacksmith to process their blacksteel and mithril, they eventually find Veruga, a cantankerous level 60 smith. Veruga refuses to forge weapons for anyone who thinks powerful gear can compensate for personal weakness, but is won over by their mithril materials and recent B-rank promotion. Charging 4 million, he agrees to craft blacksteel armor and a mithril sword enchanted with the Rune of Destruction. While Veruga works, a new novice dungeon named the Underground Raana Lake emerges. Ruche's hopes for a romantic date are dashed when Elymas reveals they are going there to fish.
19	"Empress of the Angler Clan"; Transliteration: "Tsuri-bito Zoku no Jotei" (Japanese: 釣人族の女帝)	TBA	TBA	November 6, 2026
Ruche is shocked when Elymas explains that becoming a decent fisherman takes months and equipment worth hundreds-of-millions of gold, as rare fish yield stat-boosting titles and weapons. The next day, they enter the dungeon with a rod Elymas crafted from a Red Treant. They are confronted by Sea Dragon's Fang, a fisherman adventurer clan unfairly claiming ownership of the lake. Despite expecting them to possess the stat-boosting titles he mentioned earlier, Elymas refuses to leave, determined to protect his favourite hobby. Clan boss Mary challenges him to a two-hour contest: if Elymas wins, the clan disbands; if he loses, he must join them. Elymas accepts, so the clan gloats, noting Mary’s class is Pirate and she wields an Ancient Dragon rod. Using his past experience, Elymas catches three Ogre Fish totalling 240,000 gold, but Mary lands a Golden Carp worth 600,000. When Elymas despairs, the competition-obsessed Mary urges him to fight to the end. Inspired, he continues, but ultimately their contest is rendered pointless when Ruche, using her Lady Luck skill and a Magic Tree rod for beginners, hooks four Mythril Seabream totalling 12 million gold. Conceding defeat, the clan grants public access to the lake. They return to Veruga, only to find him being threatened by Hilde, a short and angry Magic Swordswoman demanding Elymas’s new mithril sword.
20	"Magic Swordsman Hilde"; Transliteration: "Mahō Kenshi Hirude" (Japanese: 魔法剣士ヒルデ)	TBA	TBA	November 13, 2026
Claiming to be apprentice of the famous A-rank adventurer Carlos the Blackened Flameblade, Hilde arrogantly insists a Heavy Knight has no use for a mythril sword and demands Elymas sell it to her. When he refuses, she nearly decapitates him. In response, Elymas challenges her to a duel, wagering the sword against its 30-million market value, and Hilde brings Matilda as a witness. Confident in exploiting magic swordsmen’s low endurance and tendency to panic, Elymas immediately activates Dragonrage Deathgaze and No Defence Spared as the match begins. Hilde retreats to fight with ranged magic attacks, only to discover Elymas’ empowered strikes can reach any distance. Terrified of being cut in half, she surrenders. She later tries to retract her surrender, but Matilda rules that she cannot just change her mind after surrendering an official duel. Unable to pay 30 million, Hilde attempts to haggle down to 20, yet Elymas demands the full 30. Veruga reveals the weapon exceeded expectations and bears the Rune of Destruction, meaning the market value Hilde owes is actually 51.5 million. After Hilde begs for leniency, Elymas settles on 50 million. Forced to sell her own sword to pay the debt, Hilde demands a rematch. Carlos arrives, eager to meet the Heavy Knight who defeated a Magic Swordsman.
21	"Blackened Flameblade"; Transliteration: "Kokuen no Ken" (Japanese: 黒炎の剣)	TBA	TBA	November 20, 2026
Now wielding a scythe because she cannot afford a new sword, Hilde accuses Elymas of cheating to steal her money. Carlos whacks her on the head, knowing she lost an official duel, and insists she stop calling him "Master" since she is not his apprentice. To teach her a lesson, he tells Elymas to keep Hilde's money. Carlos reveals he is investigating unusual monster behaviour around Lacoryna, having been driven back from the Graveyard of Grief dungeon by an overflowing Monster Pool. Fearing rising monster disasters outside of dungeons will leave humans nowhere safe to live, he asks Elymas, Ruche, and others to help conquer the dungeon. Despite lingering distrust, Elymas equips his new mithril sword and blacksteel armor, confident his game-world knowledge will solve the mystery. He is pleased when Sea Dragon's Fang joins them. Carlos explains that he looks after Hilde, who shares his Magic Swordsman skill, to prevent her from becoming an antisocial solo adventurer like he once was. Outside the dungeon entrance, the party battles wolf monsters. Ruche is surprised to fight alongside diverse classes rather than just Heavy Knights, including a Hunter named Kelt and a Priestess named Maebel. Elymas immediately distrusts the manipulative Kelt, while Maebel reveals a sinister side by planning to control Kelt by withholding her healing magic when he inevitably needs it.
22	"Hunter Kelt and Priest Maebel"; Transliteration: "Kariudo Keruto to Shinkan Meiberu" (Japanese: 狩人ケルトと神官メイベル)	TBA	TBA	November 27, 2026

== Reception ==
By July 2026, the series had over 4 million copies in circulation.

== See also ==
- Gokudō Parasites, a manga series also illustrated by Lee Brocco
- Reincarnated as a Dragon Hatchling, another light novel series written by Nekoko
- The Unwanted Undead Adventurer, another light novel series illustrated by Jaian
