= Rino Katase =

Japanese actress (born 1957)

- Born: Noriko Sugita (杉田典子, Sugita Noriko); 8 May 1957 (age 69); Tokyo, Japan
- Occupation: Actress
- Years active: 1976–present

Rino Katase (かたせ梨乃, Katase Rino; born 8 May 1957) is a Japanese actress. She won the Award for Best Supporting Actress at the 11th Japan Academy Prize for Yakuza Wives II and Yoshiwara Enjō.

== Filmography ==
=== Film ===
- Yakuza Wives film series (1986–1999)
- Yoshiwara Enjō (1987)
- Nikutai no Mon (1988)
- Ruten no umi (1990)
- Tora-san's Easy Advice (1994)
- Brother (2000)
- Sennen no Koi Story of Genji (2001)
- Kakera: A Piece of Our Life (2010)
- 125 Years Memory (2015)
- Code Blue the Movie (2018)
- Godai: The Wunderkind (2020)
- Last of the Wolves (2021), Tamaki
- Bad City (2023)
- Oshorin (2023)

=== Television ===
- Hana no Ran (1994)
- Kinjirareta Asobi (1995)
- The Great White Tower (2003)
- Tokugawa Fūunroku Hachidai Shōgun Yoshimune (2008)
- Burning Flower (2015)
- Unbound (2025), Kiku
