= Jack-of-All-Trades, Party of None =

Japanese light novel series

- First light novel volume cover

勇者パーティを追い出された器用貧乏 ～パーティ事情で付与術士をやっていた剣士、万能へと至る～ (Yūsha Pātī o Oidasareta Kiyōbinbō: Pātī Jijō de Fuyojutsushi o Yatteita Kenshi, Bannō e to Itaru)
- Genre: Fantasy
- Novel series
- Written by: Itsuki Togami
- Published by: Shōsetsuka ni Narō
- Original run: February 5, 2021 – present
- Light novel
- Written by: Itsuki Togami
- Illustrated by: Yuri Kisaragi
- Published by: Kodansha
- Imprint: Kodansha Ranobe Books
- Original run: September 2, 2021 – present
- Volumes: 10
- Manga
- Written by: Itsuki Togami
- Illustrated by: Yonezou
- Published by: Kodansha
- English publisher: Kodansha
- Imprint: Sirius KC
- Magazine: Suiyōbi no Sirius
- Original run: October 4, 2021 – present
- Volumes: 20
- Manga

Is Selma Clumsy When She's Off Duty?!
- Written by: Itsuki Togami
- Illustrated by: Yonezou
- Published by: Kodansha
- Imprint: Sirius KC
- Magazine: Suiyōbi no Sirius
- Original run: December 24, 2025 – present
- Volumes: 1
- Anime television series
- Directed by: Hiroyuki Kanbe
- Written by: Masashi Suzuki
- Music by: Lantis; Tsubasa Handa
- Studio: animation studio42
- Licensed by: Crunchyroll: SEA: Tropics Entertainment
- Original network: Tokyo MX, BS NTV, ytv, AT-X
- Original run: January 4, 2026 – present
- Episodes: 12
- icon

Jack-of-All-Trades, Party of None (Note: Japanese: 勇者パーティを追い出された器用貧乏 ～パーティ事情で付与術士をやっていた剣士、万能へと至る～, Hepburn: Yūsha Pātī o Oidasareta Kiyōbinbō: Pātī Jijō de Fuyojutsushi o Yatteita Kenshi, Bannō e to Itaru) is a Japanese light novel series written by Itsuki Togami and illustrated by Yuri Kisaragi. It originally began as a web novel. series on the Shōsetsuka ni Narō website in February 2021 Kodansha later began publishing it in print under its Kodansha Ranobe Books imprint in September 2021; ten volumes have been released as of May 2026. A manga adaptation illustrated by Yonezou began serialization on Kodansha's Nico Nico Seiga-based Suiyōbi no Sirius website in October 2021, and has been compiled into twenty volumes as of September 2026. An anime television series adaptation produced by animation studio42 aired from January to March 2026. A second season has been announced.

== Premise ==
Betrayed by his childhood friends and cast out of the hero party, Orhun Dura – once their loyal enchanter is branded by his former comrades as "jack-of-all-trades, master of none". Alone, he sets out to forge a new path as a solo adventurer. Though he soon becomes recruited by the formidable clan "The Night Sky Silver Rabbits" igniting a spark for him to develop connections with others and cementing a childhood oath of protecting everyone he cares about.

== Characters ==
=== Night Sky Silver Rabbits ===
Orun Dula (オルン・ドゥーラ, Orun Doūra)
Voiced by: Takeo Ōtsuka (Japanese); Tom Aglio (English)
An adventurer skilled in both swordsmanship and enchantment, Orun was born with monstrous potential and Godlike abilities. At a young age he displayed a strong bond with his childhood friends Oliver and Shion, who alongside him were lauded for their incredible abilities by the adults. He promised to always protect and stand by their side, with the duo pledging equal loyalty as their "King". At some point, Orun's abilities were sealed by an original spell created by his father, and the people of the village were slaughtered in an attack by the Cyclamen Cult. Around this time, Orun lost his memories of his past and journeyed to the city with Oliver to become adventurers. They formed a party and eventually managed to reach the 93rd floor of the Great Southern Dungeon, becoming known as the Hero Party. Due to the machinations of Filly Carpenter, he was expelled for being "too weak" and started over as a solo adventurer. He was then hired by the Night Sky Silver Rabbits as a temporary instructor for newbie adventurers before joining the guild as a full-time member. Despite his strength, he easily gets flustered whenever cute girls get close or make physical contact.
Though regarded as a jack-of-all-trades, in truth, he is a highly proficient enchanter, capable of casting an absurd number of spells at extreme speed, while also being a competent swordsman. Aware of his limits with conventional enchantments, he compensated by creating his own "Original Magic"; extremely strong spells capable of enhancing not just the target but also their equipment, and they can be stacked for greater effects. He reads the situation extremely quickly and accurately, allowing him to react to any situation. With his experience, intelligence, and ability to quickly learn new skills, he is extremely powerful. During an encounter with his forgotten childhood friend Shion, she surmised he was subconsciously breaking the seal on his powers through sheer force of will.
Sophia Clodel (ソフィア・クローデル, Sofia Kurōderu)
Voiced by: Hina Tachibana (Japanese); Monica Flatley (English)
A rookie adventurer and Selma's younger half-sister. She is a member of the Night Sky Silver Rabbits guild, whom Orun saved after her party abandoned her to high-level monsters, which has led her to develop a crush on him. The illegitimate child of a noble, she was mistreated by her family until Selma took her in.
Selma Clodel (セルマ・クローデル, Seruma Kurōderu)
Voiced by: Saori Ōnishi (Japanese); Corinne Sudberg (English)
Sophia's older half-sister and a member of the Night Sky Silver Rabbits guild, publicly renowned as the "Strongest Enchanter." Her special ability is telepathy, allowing her to communicate with others at larger distances. Thinking highly of Orun's enchantment skills, she was genuinely surprised when the Hero's Party expelled him and immediately attempted to recruit him into her guild afterward. A former noblewoman, she ran away from her family with Sophia after learning that they were abusing the latter. She is extremely protective of Sophia, getting jealous when Sophia dotes on Orun. She also seems to have a crush on Orun, conflicted with supporting her sister's feelings.
Logan Hayward (ローガン・ヘイワード, Rōgan Heiwādo)
Voiced by: Yō Taichi
A rookie adventurer and leader of Sophia's party. Initially, he was a haughty enchanter who looked down on Orun for being kicked out of the Hero's Party. However, he swiftly comes to respect him after seeing him in action, even wondering why he was kicked out. Logan became an adventurer to earn money, as his village was very poor. Despite this, the villagers pooled their savings to send him to the city to become one, and he hopes to repay them by earning a great deal of money.
Caroline Inglaud (キャロライン・イングロット, Kyarorain Ingurotto)
Voiced by: Manaka Iwami
A rookie adventurer and member of Sophia's party. She is a dodge-tank with a cheerful and reckless personality, though beneath her lighthearted demeanor lies a girl who struggles to see the value of her own life due to past trauma. She possesses a rare ability that allows her to heal wounds almost instantly, which led the criminal organization Cyclamen Church to abduct her at a young age and subject her to repeated experimentation, leaving her with severe PTSD. Because of this, she fears being hit whenever people are unhappy and desperately tries to make everyone around her smile, often throwing herself into danger believing her ability will save her and that defeating the enemy will keep her friends happy. Orun later reassures her that risking herself only makes them worry, telling her to value her own safety and promising that no one will ever hurt her again. She is also aware of Sophia's crush on Orun and occasionally tries to help her.
Luna Flockhart (ルーナ・フロックハート, Rūna Furokkuhāto)
Voiced by: Masumi Tazawa
Formerly the Hero Party's healer, she was the only member of the group who was fully aware of how much they relied on Orun's buffs, being furious when her teammates replaced him behind her back. However, as the adoptive daughter of a noble sponsoring them, she was initially forced to stay with the party. She cares deeply about Orun, possibly even having a crush on him. After her father is arrested as the head of a human trafficking ring and the Hero Party's eventual dissolution, Luna joins the Night Sky Silver Rabbits. Due to the guild's high-level parties being full at this time, she becomes the healer of Sophia's Party once they are promoted to full-fledged adventurers. Luna acts as the group's mentor alongside Orun, and firmly believes the children will reach her level with time and experience.
Rain Hagwell (レイン・ハグウェル, Rein Hagūeru)
Voiced by: Seria Fukagawa
A mage and a member of the Night Sky Silver Rabbits guild's strongest party. She can cast high-level spells extremely quickly, and works well with the team. She tends to tease Selma about Orun.
Lucrecia Otis (ルクレーシャ・オーティス, Rukurēsha Ōtisu)
Voiced by: Tsumugi Okura
A healer and a member of the Night Sky Silver Rabbits guild's strongest party. Her special ability allows her to track magic and find enemies, proving very useful in dungeons. She's very glad that she gets along with Orun and that he joined the party.
Wilkes Severley (ウィルクス・セヴァリー, Uirukusu Sevuarī)
Voiced by: Kento Hama
A tank and a member of the Night Sky Silver Rabbits guild's strongest party. He uses a double-ended spear, which is extremely hard to use. He not only blocks attacks, but has the ability to cancel them out. Like the others, he works very well with the team and is supportive of Orun.

=== Hero Party ===
Oliver Cardiff (オリヴァー・カーディフ, Orivuā Kādifu)
Voiced by: Yoshiki Nakajima (Japanese); Ben Stegmair (English)
Leader of the Hero Party and a close childhood friend of Orun and Shion, the trio were born with amazing potential, with Oliver being referred to as a future hero by the adults of their village. Long ago, Orun vowed to protect the others with his own strength with the two pledging themselves to him as their "King", both recognizing his abilities as far greater than their own. When the village was destroyed, Oliver and Orun journeyed to the city and became adventurers, but due to the mental manipulations of Filly Carpenter, they forgot several details of their pasts. She eventually turned the party against Orun, whom they deemed weak compared to other enchanters, resulting in his banishment. After failing to defeat the Black Dragon and allowing it to access the upper floors of the dungeon through a portal they created, the Hero Party was punished severely.
Oliver loses much of his notoriety to Orun when the latter slays the Black Dragon single handed, eventually being defeated by his old friend while trying to regain his clout in a martial arts tournament. Oliver and his companions are then mind-controlled by Filly into slaughtering innocent people, but are stopped by the timely intervention of Orun and the other members of the Night Sky Silver Rabbits. Once he regains his senses, Oliver is freed from Filly's brainwashing and remembers the details of his promise with Orun and Shion long ago. He encourages his friend before being taken away by authorities and resolves to continue supporting Orun as the "King's Sword". Oliver is later seen attempting to break through the mental manipulations placed on Anneli and Derrick.
Anneli Wiles (アネリ・ワイルズ, Aneri Wairuzu)
Voiced by: Sayumi Watabe (Japanese); Elise Baughman (English)
The Hero Party's magic caster and the first to start looking down on Orun as a "jack of all trades." In truth, however, she had become overly dependent on Orun's buffs, but mistook the borrowed power for her own. As a result, she grew rusty and lost the ability to cast higher-level spells on her own. Her sudden ill-treatment of Orun is eventually revealed to be the result of Filly Carpenter's brainwashing. After being forced by the latter into attacking innocent bystanders, the Hero Party is arrested.
Derrick Mosely (デリック・モーズレイ, Derikku Mozurei)
Voiced by: Kō Bonkobara (Japanese); Tom Henry (English)
The Hero Party's tank, who was arrogant and openly looked down on Orun as "weak." In truth, however, he had become overly dependent on Orun's buffs, but mistook the borrowed power for his own. Without Orun's buffs, he proved himself incapable of withstanding most attacks. In truth he was mentally controlled by Filly Carpenter. After being forced by the latter into attacking innocent bystanders, the Hero Party is arrested.

=== Cyclamen Cult ===
Beria Santh
The mysterious leader of the Cyclamen Cult, Beria Santh is a powerful figure possessing unparalleled swordsmanship skills and a mysterious power said to defy logic to the point where even S-Class Adventurers are incapable of grasping his strength. Little is known about him aside from the fact that his subordinates possess a reverence towards him akin to that of a God. 20 years ago, he rescued the members of the legendary party "Golden Echo" from an attack by the Amuntzers.
Filly Carpenter (フィリー・カーペンター, Firī Kāpentā)
Voiced by: Rumi Okubo
One of the top executives of the Cyclamen Cult, Filly is known as the "Guide" among her contemporaries. While introduced as the enchanter hired to replace Orun in the Hero Party, she is actually the mastermind behind his banishment, having used her unique skill "Cognitive Alteration" to control the thoughts and memories of the people around him. She is a tactical genius responsible for orchestrating several schemes within the country, using her ability to warp the perceptions of other people to further her agenda. She is even capable of turning victims into her mind-controlled puppets with enough preparation, and can easily erase memories without their awareness, allowing her to operate without fear of exposure.
Oswald McLeod
Called the "Scientist", Oswald McLeod is an immoral scientist serving as one of the cult's executives. He is the man responsible for Caroline Inglaud's traumatic past with the organization, having subjected her to cruel experiments while dismissing her life as a worthy sacrifice. An intelligent and frightening man, the scientist is capable of reproducing artificial monsters using information from dungeons, and can instantly devise and employ countermeasures to even the most advanced magic. He possesses the same unique ability as Caroline, and can instantly recover from physical injuries.

=== Amuntzers ===
Shion Nasturtium (シオン・ナスタチウム, Shion Nasutachiumu (also known as Sion))
Voiced by: Akane Fujita
Orun and Oliver's childhood friend, they promised each other they'd become strong to protect those they love. Unlike the others, Shion's retains her full memories of their shared past and is aware of the sealing spell placed Orun by his father, noting that without it he possesses strength far-surpassing either her or Oliver. Shion is a member of the Amuntzers, an organization known for attacking adventurers to prevent them from conquering the dungeons and inadvertently releasing the Evil God from the mythical age. She is known as the "White Witch" for her ability to rapidly cast advanced spells without constructing magical formulas, and is noted by Orun to be the most powerful mage he has ever encountered.
The two reunite when her team is sent to target the "Dragon Slayer", resulting in a fight with her childhood friend. Recognizing him during the struggle, she agrees to leave peacefully after narrowly losing the battle. Shion later aids him against the Cyclamen Cult, but decides not to tell him the truth about his past, knowing he would attempt to take the burden she bears onto himself. She is saddened that he does not remember her.

== Media ==
=== Light novel ===
Written by Itsuki Togami, Jack-of-All-Trades, Party of None began serialization on the user-generated web novel publishing site Shōsetsuka ni Narō on February 5, 2021. The series was later acquired by Kodansha who began releasing the series with illustrations by Yuri Kisaragi under its Kodansha Ranobe Books light novel imprint on September 2, 2021. Ten volumes have been released as of May 2026.

No.	Release date	ISBN
1	September 2, 2021	978-4-06-524906-2
2	March 2, 2022	978-4-06-526060-9
3	September 2, 2022	978-4-06-529354-6
4	February 2, 2023	978-4-06-531131-8
5	August 2, 2023	978-4-06-532814-9
6	December 28, 2023	978-4-06-534477-4
7	May 31, 2024	978-4-06-535657-9
8	December 2, 2024	978-4-06-537617-1
9	October 31, 2025	978-4-06-540863-6
10	May 1, 2026	978-4-06-543347-8

=== Manga ===
A manga adaptation illustrated by Yonezou began serialization on Kodansha's Nico Nico Seiga-based Suiyōbi no Sirius manga website on October 4, 2021. The first tankōbon volume was released on March 9, 2022. The manga's chapters have been compiled into twenty tankōbon volumes as of September 2026.

The manga's chapters are published in English on Kodansha's K Manga app.

No.	Release date	ISBN
1	March 9, 2022	978-4-06-526980-0
2	May 9, 2022	978-4-06-527631-0
3	July 7, 2022	978-4-06-528257-1
4	September 8, 2022	978-4-06-529278-5
5	December 8, 2022	978-4-06-529899-2
6	March 9, 2023	978-4-06-530839-4
7	June 8, 2023	978-4-06-531797-6
8	September 8, 2023	978-4-06-532797-5
9	December 7, 2023	978-4-06-533805-6
10	March 8, 2024	978-4-06-534765-2
11	June 7, 2024	978-4-06-535682-1
12	September 9, 2024	978-4-06-536657-8
13	December 9, 2024	978-4-06-537700-0
14	March 7, 2025	978-4-06-538697-2
15	June 9, 2025	978-4-06-539684-1
16	September 9, 2025	978-4-06-540628-1
17	December 9, 2025	978-4-06-541684-6
18	March 9, 2026	978-4-06-542762-0
19	June 9, 2026	978-4-06-543741-4
20	September 9, 2026	978-4-06-544767-3

==== Spin-off ====
A spin-off manga also illustrated by Yonezou, titled Jack-of-All-Trades, Party of None: Is Selma Clumsy When She's Off Duty?! (勇者パーティを追い出された器用貧乏 外伝 オフのセルマさんは不器用！？, Yūsha Pātī o Oidasareta Kiyōbinbō: Ofu no Seruma-san wa Bukiyō!?), began serialization on the same website on December 24, 2025. The manga follows Selma Clodel. The first tankōbon volume was released on March 9, 2026.

No.	Release date	ISBN
1	March 9, 2026	978-4-06-542762-0

=== Anime ===
An anime television series adaptation was announced on March 3, 2025. It is produced by animation studio42 and directed by Hiroyuki Kanbe, with Masashi Suzuki handling series composition and Naoto Nakamura designing the characters. The series aired from January 4 to March 22, 2026, on Tokyo MX and other networks. The opening theme song is "Shirube", performed by Tokoyami Towa, while the ending theme song is "Sukuu", performed by Nowlu. Crunchyroll is streaming the series. Tropics Entertainment licensed the series in Southeast Asia for streaming on the Tropics Anime Asia YouTube channel.

After the airing of the final episode, a second season was announced.

==== Episodes ====
No.	Title	Original release date (Note: Episodes are released on ABEMA, dAnime Store and Crunchyroll 3 days before their televised airings.)
1	"The Jack-of-All-Trades Becomes a Swordsman Once More"; Transliteration: "Nandemoya ga Futatabi Kenshi ni Naru" (Japanese: 何でも屋が再び剣士になる)	December 31, 2025
Orun Dula, a swordsman and enchanter, is kicked from the Hero Party by Hero Oliver, his childhood friend, and members Anneli and Derrick, who replace him with a stronger enchanter. Anneli refers to him as "Jack-of-all-trades", referencing his use of multiple weak magic skills without mastering any. Orun develops his own style, combining swordsmanship with support magic. Adventuring in a dungeon, he overhears another party abandoning their new party member after being attacked by orcs. Angry at their cowardice, Orun rushes to save her. The girl, Sophia Claudel, is revealed to be a member of the Night Sky Silver Rabbits, the biggest clan in Nohitant Kingdom. She also happens to be the sister of Selma Claudel, the continent's most powerful enchanter. It was because of meeting her that Oliver replaced him, believing he needed an enchanter as strong as Selma. Selma remembers Orun from a previous dungeon raid and hires him to teach new recruits on an expedition to floor 50 of the Great South Dungeon. Orun realizes they are trying to shortcut recruits past the difficult boss battles by pairing them with veterans. He doubts he will be of use but agrees to go as a swordsman and not an enchanter. Orun visits his shopkeeper friend, Old Man, who urges him to do his best as long as people need him.
2	"No Going Back for the Jack-of-All-Trades"; Transliteration: "Modorenai Kiyōbinbō" (Japanese: 戻れない器用貧乏)	January 7, 2026
Vince Bryers, leader of the Silver Rabbits, is surprised the Hero party let Orun go when he was clearly the secret behind their success, with Selma explaining the speed at which Orun casts spells is incredible, and his tactical awareness is almost superhuman. Orun is suspicious of Vince's goal of getting the recruits to floor 51 in only three days. Selma introduces Orun to the other veterans: healer Cathy and defenders Anthem and Bernard. Orun is put in charge of the most problematic recruits, including Sophia, an arrogant young enchanter named Logan Hayward, and cheerful defender Caroline Inglot, who prefers to dodge attacks with quick movements. They enter the dungeon, and Orun learns Logan is a skilled enchanter but has low stamina and no experience as a leader. Caroline is fast, but she also attacks recklessly and lacks power. Sophia is strong but also shy as part of a team. They reach floor 21 and return to the surface for the day, where Orun learns Oliver finally recruited an enchanter to replace him in the Hero party. Orun unexpectedly encounters Luna, another member of the Hero party who was always kind to him. Luna asks him to return to the Hero party, but he angrily refuses as Oliver's betrayal still hurts too much to want to see him again.
3	"The Jack-of-all-Trades Speaks of His Ideals"	January 14, 2026
A newspaper claims Orun was kicked from the Hero party for weakness. Selma is furious at Oliver's lies and reminds the recruits that Orun reached floor 94 and kept them safe the previous day. Sophia and Caroline have no problem believing in him, but Logan starts to have doubts, even though Orun leads them successfully to floor 35 where they defeat a Death Tarantula. On the surface, Orun gets dinner with Anthem and Bernard while Logan questions Sophia and Caroline about Orun. From their answers, he slowly realizes Orun did everything perfectly. Realizing he underestimated Orun, Logan decides to learn what he can from him. Anthem and Bernard are curious about Orun's switch from Enchanter to Swordsman, so Orun explains his grandfather was a Swordsman and inspired him. He only became an Enchanter to help Oliver reach floor 94. What he doesn't tell Bernard and Anthem is that it was a foolish way to reach floor 94 as they did it too fast so Oliver did not learn anything from the experience. As a result, without Orun there is no chance the Hero party will ever surpass 94. Sophia considers asking Orun to join the Silver Rabbits so she can see him every day. The next day, the Hero party entered the labyrinth too.
4	"The Heroes Party Looks Back"	January 21, 2026
The Hero Party heads to floor 92 to test their new Enchanter, Filly. Luna knows they are going to fail without Orun. As predicted, they are all weaker than expected, plus Filly's magic keeps running out, and she can't direct them in battle. The floor boss, a Black Dragon, appears, and Filly freezes in terror while Anneli and Derrick are injured. Unable to believe what is happening, Oliver desperately uses Fickle Gate, a one-time item, to teleport them to a random safer floor. Unfortunately, the dragon steals the gate and is teleported to a higher floor, putting the lives of every adventurer in danger. Luna insists they have to tell the guild to force-teleport every adventurer out of the dungeon. She also insists they will need Orun. As they are escaping, Luna explains to them that Orun knows he is weaker than most enchanters, but he invented Original Magic Spells to make up for it. Without knowing it, Oliver and the others benefitted from this immensely and became arrogant enough to neglect their normal training. As a result, without Orun, their strength is mid-level at best. They reach the surface, where people assume they completed their mission already and cheer for them. Knowing he doesn't deserve it, Oliver becomes enraged and determined to prove he doesn't need Orun.
5	"The Jack-of-All-Trades' Bad Feeling Comes True"	January 28, 2026
While preparing to enter the dungeon for the third day, Orun talks about Albert Sensible, former ace of the Silver Rabbits who was killed by the black dragon. Selma hints that she wants Orun to replace him, but he feigns ignorance. Luna reaches the guild and desperately asks all adventurers be teleported out of the dungeon. Orun's group reach floor 40 but are confused there are no monsters, making Orun sense something is wrong. The Guildmaster is unsure about ordering a force teleport as the mana requirement is massive. Orun continues teaching Sophia, Caroline and Logan, in particular about the use of trap spells and learning to cast multiple spells at once. Guildmaster and other high-ranking sorcerers prepare to cast the teleport spell while letting Oliver know the entire disaster is his fault. Sophia asks Orun to be her personal tutor, but Orun worries what Selma's reaction would be. Guildmaster demands Oliver kill the dragon, to which Luna agrees if they teleport Orun's group out first as they will need him. Orun and the other veterans defeat the floor 50 boss while the recruits observe and are amazed by their teamwork. Before they can celebrate, the black dragon appears above them.
6	"The Jack-of-All-Trades Overcomes His Limits"	February 4, 2026
Everyone freezes in sudden terror, except Orun who manages to rally the veterans to protect the trainees. As this is all they can manage Orun realizes he will have to fight the dragon alone. Selma notices that despite the chaos, Orun somehow strengthened their defensive shields at just the right moment to stop the dragon killing them all instantly. Selma is amazed Orun uses impossible original spells he created; one to reflect the dragon's fire back on itself, and one to multiply his own power by 32 times the normal limit. He successfully injures the dragon's neck, but it delivers a powerful attack in return. Selma is frustrated there is nothing she can do to help him except protect the trainees. Orun reveals his goal is to become capable of wielding the skills of all members of the hero party; defence, attack, healing, and the Hero's Divine Flash. After a long and complicated battle, he activates his own Pitch Black Divine Flash to sever the dragon's head, but the dragon defends itself by sacrificing its tail to protect its neck. Orun's 32 times boost starts to run out and his sword is destroyed. Instead, he compresses pure magic into a solid shape, the greatsword Destruction, and with one final attack, the Black Dragon is killed.
7	"The Jack-of-All-Trades Follows His Feelings"	February 11, 2026
Orun's old team members return to their great dungeon to confront the dragon, only to find it vanquished by Orun alone. They are left in awe or feeling inadequate in comparison to Orun's prowess. After the battle, Selma takes Orun to a meeting with Vince Bryers, the leader of the Silver Rabbits, and others who express their desire for Orun to join their ranks. After meeting with the Silver Rabbits, Orun encounters the guild master, who wants to investigate the events that transpired and their impact. To do so, he calls upon his former teammates, where they confront each other. However, upon seeing him, they misunderstand him and perceive him as a threat. Feeling betrayed and disillusioned, Orun firmly believes that there is no way back to them and that his path lies ahead. He leaves them to grapple with the consequences of their actions. Determined to find Orun and persuade him to join the Silver Rabbits, the recruits engage in extensive search for him through the city only to find Orun escaping them and unable to catch up with him. Orun finds this amusing and gradually realizes that his search for belonging, since he was used and abandoned by his former teammates, has left him with doubts. Ultimately, Orun decides to embrace the Silver Rabbits and embark on a new journey.
8	"The Jack-of-All-Trades Fights With Everyone"	February 18, 2026
As children, Oliver grew frustrated that Orun was not trying during training, when in reality Orun was already stronger than Oliver and held himself back. His friend Scion promised she would support Orun once she was strong enough. The Guildmaster contacts the Guildmaster of the North with news of Orun's defeat of the dragon. North-Guildmaster, who knows something of Orun's past, asks to be kept informed of Orun's actions going forward. Scion, now part of an organization that conquered the West, is ordered to investigate a dragon slayer in the South and kill him if he has allied with the Church. Scion is willing to do anything to destroy the Church, as she was told priests killed Orun when they were children. Orun is promoted to Lieutenant and placed into Unit 1 with party members Selma, Rain the sorceress, Lucrecia the healer and Wilkes the tank. They are amazed Orun was using a mass-produced sword and insist that as a lieutenant he needs a unique sword forged by the Silver Rabbit's blacksmith Aran. Orun provides a scale from the black dragon as the main material but realizes too late it might upset Unit 1, who were defeated by the dragon when it killed their teammate, Albert. They claim to be alright with it, but Orun remains certain he upset them.
9	"The Jack-of-All-Trades Has a Bad Feeling"	February 25, 2026
Unit 1 is asked to collect Noxious-sheep skins from floor 86, which is also home to Earth Dragons. Orun is impressed with his new party's skills which includes tracking magic, magic nullification, high level explosion and telepathy. Managing to fit well into their teamwork, Orun finds himself having fun in the dungeon. Orun is confidant that even without him Unit 1 could have killed the black dragon with their current skills. After collecting the sheep skins, Unit 1 are glad Orun is easy to work with. The others tease Selma over her interest in Orun before getting drunk. Selma and Rain both try to drunkenly seduce Orun, but he uses magic to put them to sleep for his own safety. He returns Selma home to Sophia who scolds her for bothering Orun, but is also glad Selma is finally having fun. Selma realizes she might be in love with Orun, just like Sophia. The next morning, Orun and Selma go to meet the Adventurer Management Division of the Silver Rabbits.
10	"The Jack-of-All-Trades Makes them Train Hard"	March 4, 2026
Estella and Carla of Management Division allow Orun to mentor his trainees however he wishes, as long as they can handle the labyrinth's middle floors within six months. Orun knows Sophia is only Selma's half sister, her mother having been a mistress who died. Mostly neglected by Selma's family, Selma eventually took her in. Orun learns Sophia wants to be like Selma and Logan wants to become wealthy to support the village he grew up in. Caroline is content on killing monsters to make people happy, but Orun is concerned with her risky fighting style. Caroline reveals she has a special ability to heal so fast she is almost immortal. Orun recalls Caroline spent her childhood prisoner of the Cyclamen Church, a vast criminal organization dedicated to reviving their evil God. Rescued by Albert, she never really recovered. Orun shows her that her behaviour actually scares Logan and Sophia, so she throws her knives away. Realizing Caroline is plagued by memories of abuse, Orun has her dodge flying footballs to increase her agility. He also has Logan begin spear training, since keeping enemies at a greater distance will allow him to cast more spells. He has Sophia maintain multiple spells to improve her focus, while Aran finishes Orun's unique sword.
11	"The Jack-of-All-Trades Fears For His Friends"	March 11, 2026
Orun names his new sword Schwarzhase (Black Rabbit). Selma is proud to learn that Sophia, Caroline, and Logan have already reached floor 29, while she herself hopes to reach floor 92 and face the Black Dragon to get revenge for Albert. A rumour appears of Amunthoth, the second largest criminal gang after the Cyclamen Church, who specialize in killing adventurers as they believe the Great Dungeons should be left uncleared. Sophia worries that her sister will end up like Albert, along with the fact that Orun won't train them anymore if they clear floor 30 and become real adventurers. Due to conflicting schedules, Orun will be with Selma on floor 92 so he can't observe their floor 30 trial, leaving it to an official observer from Unit 2. On floor 30, Sophia, Caroline, and Logan are captured by Scion and her party, who murder their observer and plan to use them as bait to lure in the rumoured Dragonslayer. When Unit 1 confronts the Black Dragon on floor 92, Orun is alerted to Sophia's party being in danger from a magic tool he gave them. The distraction allows the dragon to heal itself, leaving Unit 1 with the choice of starting their battle again from the beginning, or trying to escape and rescue them.
12	"The Jack-of-All-Trades Protects His Comrades"	March 18, 2026
Sophia discovers her unique ability of Telekinesis, which she uses to save Logan from swordsman Guiba. Orun destroys the dragon in one strike. Guiba decides to kill Sophia to stop her becoming a powerful adventurer in the future, but she is saved by Orun. Guiba is defeated along with Scion's party. Scion proves Orun's equal with the incredible speed at which she casts spells. Scion admits she dislikes killing adventurers, but it is necessary as the Original was destroyed and the Replica stolen by enemies, so she must stop the dungeons being cleared. Unsure what she means, Orun captures her, causing them to recognise each other, though Orun isn't sure how he knows her. Scion and her party teleport away, with Scion hoping to see Orun again. Scion decides to get revenge on the woman she blames for separating her from Orun for so many years. Oliver trains in preparation for an upcoming martial arts tournament, hoping to prove he is still the hero. The North Guildmaster is amused Orun defeated the dragon twice and decides if he clears the dungeon he will forgive the sin Orun committed against him in the past. Knowing an even more difficult fight is coming, Orun begins his own training.

== Reception ==
By December 2024, the series had over 3.7 million copies in circulation.

== See also ==
- The Magical Revolution of the Reincarnated Princess and the Genius Young Lady, another light novel series with the same illustrator
