= Yakuza Wives =

1986 Japanese yakuza film

- Theatrical release poster
- Directed by: Hideo Gosha
- Screenplay by: Koji Takada
- Based on: Gokudō no Tsuma-tachi by Shōko Ieda
- Produced by: Gorō Kusakabe; Kyō Namura
- Starring: Shima Iwashita; Rino Katase; Masanori Sera; Mikio Narita
- Cinematography: Fujio Morita
- Edited by: Isamu Ichida
- Music by: Masaru Sato
- Production company: Toei
- Distributed by: Toei
- Release date: November 5, 1986 (Japan)
- Running time: 120 minutes
- Country: Japan
- Language: Japanese

Yakuza Wives (Japanese: 極道の妻(おんな)たち, Hepburn: Gokudō no Onna-tachi) is a 1986 Japanese yakuza film directed by Hideo Gosha and starring Shima Iwashita and Rino Katase. Koji Takada wrote the script based on journalist Shōko Ieda's 1986 book Gokudō no Tsuma-tachi, which is composed of interviews with the wives and girlfriends of real yakuza. The film was released by Toei on November 5, 1986. It was a critical and commercial success, spawning 15 sequels. At the 10th Japan Academy Film Prizes, Iwashita was nominated for Best Actress, Katase was nominated for Best Supporting Actress, and Masanori Sera was nominated for Best Supporting Actor.

== Plot summary ==
While her husband is incarcerated, Tamaki Awazu is serving as the boss of the Awazu Family, a yakuza family in Takamatsu that is subordinate to the Domoto Syndicate, the largest crime organization in Japan. Tamaki returns home to Osaka to inform her younger sister, Makoto, that she has a man who wishes to meet her for the prospect of marriage (omiai). When the Domoto boss dies, Tatsuo Kakinuma is announced as the new head of the organization. However, other family members led by Akimasa Koiso split off and form the Horyukai. When Tamaki refuses to align the Awasu Family with the Horyukai, Koiso has an Awazu business shot up and orders Kiyoshi Sugita to hire an assassin to kill Kakinuma.

Coincidentally, Makoto is being romantically pursued by Sugita. When they both find themselves in Guam, Sugita reveals to her that he is a yakuza and rapes her. Back in Japan, Makoto tells Tamaki that she has met a yakuza member in order to get out of the arranged marriage, but the older sister refuses to listen and proceeds anyway. When Kakinuma is killed, Makoto sees the man who turned himself in for the crime on the news and realizes he was with Sugita in Guam. When she confronts Sugita, he reveals that he now knows she is the younger sister of Tamaki, tells her that he is the one who actually shot Kakinuma, and professes to be in love with her. He also tells Makoto he will kill her is she refuses to marry him, and his subordinates hold a mock wedding for the two. Although confused, when police interrupt the ceremony, Makoto hides the gun used to kill Kakinuma that Sugita hands her. When he is released from questioning, she is there to meet him, having accepted their marriage.

Meanwhile, the Domoto Syndicate declares war on the Horyukai, resulting in 17 deaths in total from both sides. Due to these casualties, Kinue, wife of the original Domoto leader, considers agreeing to a settlement with Horyukai that was proposed by neutral organizations in Tokyo, but Tamaki asks her to wait three months until her husband Awazu is released from prison. When Tamaki survives an assassination attempt, Awazu members drive vehicles into the building Koiso is staying at with his family. Fed up, Koiso's wife brokers a meeting between her husband and Tamaki, where Koiso says he will consider disbanding the Horyukai. However, when Sugita hears about it, he can not accept a settlement after losing several men and tries to get Koiso to stop it by threatening him with a knife; he eventually stabs himself to show his resolve, before fleeing. After their father dies, Makoto begins living at Tamaki's house. After learning Sugita's whereabouts, she tries to leave the house, but Tamaki refuses to allow it and the sisters get into a physical fight. The elder sister eventually relents after seeing Makoto's strong feelings for Sugita. She encourages her younger sister to become a full-fledged yakuza wife and declares they are no longer family.

Makoto reunites with the injured Sugita and they start to have sex. But new Awazu Family member Banji barges in and stabs Sugita to death, before Makoto shoots Banji dead. As Tamaki is watching her husband step off the boat as he is released from prison, Sugita Family member Taichi jumps out of the water and shoots him.

== Cast ==
- Shima Iwashita as Tamaki Awazu
- Rino Katase as Makoto Ike
- Masanori Sera as Kiyoshi Sugita
- Mikio Narita as Akimasa Koiso
- Akiko Kana as Yasuko, Koiso's wife
- Riki Takeuchi as Taichi Hanata, a Sugita Family member
- Murasaki Fujima as Kinue Domoto
- Shirō Ōsaka as Tamaki and Makoto's father
- Kojiro Shimizu as Banji, a debt collector and later Awazu Family member

== Production ==
Yakuza Wives is based on journalist Shōko Ieda's Gokudō no Tsuma-tachi, a 1986 collection of interviews and profiles on the wives and girlfriends of real yakuza that was serialized in Shūkan Bunshun. After reading some of it on a train, Toei producer Gorō Kusakabe successfully struck a deal with Ieda, who was already being courted by Toho, Shochiku and various TV stations to adapt the work. Toei head Shigeru Okada ordered frequent yakuza film screenwriter Koji Takada to adapt the book, and tapped Hideo Gosha to direct. Takada included aspects from real yakuza in the script, including the Yamaichi War, which was still ongoing at the time, and what is known as the Mikuni Incident. For the lead actress, Okada chose Shima Iwashita. Gosha was initially against casting Rino Katase, but Toei insisted and she eventually won over the director with her performance. According to Nathan Stuart, Katase's initial nerves on set can be seen early in the film, where her hands are trembling. Ieda has a bit part in the film. Some scenes were filmed on-location in Guam.

Because Tamaki Awazu was so different from her previous roles, Iwashita said she was very hesitant to accept until speaking with Gosha, whom she trusted. She struggled with creating the character; "Usually I read the script and go to various places to prepare for the role, but this time I asked the producer if I could stay at a real yakuza wife's house for about three days and experience her life to prepare for the role, and he said, 'No way!' (laughs)." However, she said this actually expanded her imagination for developing the character. Iwashita was particular about her costumes. With no stylist, all the kimonos in the film were chosen by her going to a shop with Gosha and trying them on. She also selected specific kimonos for specific scenes; "If I was going to fire a pistol, I had to look cool, so I left the collar open. I tried wearing a small necklace around my chest and matching earrings to create a different world. I also wore the obi low and tied it at a slight angle to give it a chic look. I walked with my legs wide apart, and spoke with my chin up in a low voice, which brought me closer to the image of a yakuza wife I had in mind." Behind the scenes, staff members lit cigarettes for her and helped her out of the car.

== Release ==
Yakuza Wives was released in Japanese theaters on November 5, 1986. Kuniaki Fukunaga, chief of publicity, had the idea to feature an illustration of Iwashita with a full body tattoo on the poster, and had a newspaper run it to gauge reaction. Although Iwashita approved, her husband, Masahiro Shinoda, threatened to remove her from the film, and the image was never used on a poster as a result.

Japan Society screened Yakuza Wives in New York City between March 14 and June 30, 2011. 88 Films released the film on Blu-ray in the United Kingdom on April 21, 2025, and in North America the following day.

== Reception ==
At the 10th Japan Academy Film Prizes in 1987, Yakuza Wives earned Iwashita a nomination for Best Actress, Katase a nomination for Best Supporting Actress, and Sera a nomination for Best Supporting Actor.

Although noting it was not the first yakuza film to feature women protagonists, Mark Schilling wrote that its "combination of sex, action, intrigue and rare behind-the-scenes look" at the women made Yakuza Wives a box office success that spawned the most successful yakuza film series of 1980s.

A.W. Kautzer of The Movie Isle called Yakuza Wives an electrifying piece of existential crime film and a riveting and often harrowing account of women married to yakuza, some of whom "have more power than one would expect and others who are helpless to their husband's manipulation and abuse".

Inside Pulse's Joe Corey wrote that with Yakuza Wives, Toei found a new perspective on yakuza crime films and noted that they were not just simply swapping genders on old scripts. He called it dramatic without feeling like a soap opera and found the finale to be "stunning".

David Brook of Blueprint: Review called the film a slickly produced crime drama that puts the women in the spotlight and gave it four out of five stars. He also praised the technical side of the film for its "carefully conceived and well-executed shots" and the Western jazz-flavored music.

== Sequels ==
Yakuza Wives has spawned 15 sequels in what is abbreviated as the "Goku Tsuma" (極妻; lit. 'Extreme Wives') series. Yukiyo Toake starred in the first sequel, followed by Yoshiko Mita in the second. Shima Iwashita then returned to star in the last seven that were given theatrical releases, which ended in 1998. The following year, Reiko Takashima took over as lead actress for five direct-to-video installments. Eight years after Takashima's last film, Tomoka Kurotani starred in 2013's Yakuza Wives Neo. In 2024, screenwriter Koji Takada said he was writing a "Yakuza Wives for the Reiwa era" that is set in his hometown of Osaka in order to revive the series.

Year	Film	Director	Screenwriter	Lead actress
Theatrically released
1987	Yakuza Wives II; Gokudō no Onna-tachi Tsu (極道の妻たちII)	Toru Dobashi	Koji Takada	Yukiyo Toake
1989	Yakuza Wives: Third Generation Elder Sister; Gokudō no Onna-tachi Sandaime Ane (極道の妻たち 三代目姐)	Yasuo Furuhata	Koji Takada	Yoshiko Mita
1990	Yakuza Wives: Final Battle; Gokudō no Onna-tachi Saigo no Tatakai (極道の妻たち 最後の戦い)	Kōsaku Yamashita	Koji Takada	Shima Iwashita
1991	New Yakuza Wives; Shin Gokudō no Onna-tachi (新極道の妻たち)	Sadao Nakajima	Machiko Nasu	Shima Iwashita
1993	New Yakuza Wives: Be Prepared; Shin Gokudō no Onna-tachi Kakugo Shi Iya (緋牡丹博徒 お竜参上)	Kōsaku Yamashita	Koji Takada	Shima Iwashita
1994	New Yakuza Wives: Horetara Jigoku; Shin Gokudō no Onna-tachi Horetara Jigoku (新極道の妻たち 惚れたら地獄)	Yasuo Furuhata	Hirō Matsuda	Shima Iwashita
1995	New Yakuza Wives: Crimson Bonds; Shin Gokudō no Onna-tachi Akai Kizuna (極道の妻たち 赫い絆)	Ikuo Sekimoto	Gōro Hanawa	Shima Iwashita
1996	New Yakuza Wives: Dangerous Gamble; Shin Gokudō no Onna-tachi Kiken na Kake (極道の妻たち 危険な賭け)	Sadao Nakajima	Koji Takada	Shima Iwashita
1998	New Yakuza Wives: Decision; Shin Gokudō no Onna-tachi Kejime (極道の妻たち 決着)	Sadao Nakajima	Koji Takada	Shima Iwashita
Direct-to-video
1999	Yakuza Wives: Red Murder; Gokudō no Onna-tachi Akai Satsui (極道の妻たち 赤い殺意)	Ikuo Sekimoto	Sadao Nakajima	Reiko Takashima
1999	Yakuza Wives: I Want You Dead; Gokudō no Onna-tachi Shinde Moraimasu (極道の妻たち 死んで貰います)	Ikuo Sekimoto	Koji Takada	Reiko Takashima
2000	Yakuza Wives: Revenge; Gokudō no Onna-tachi Ribenji (極道の妻たち リベンジ)	Ikuo Sekimoto	Sadao Nakajima	Reiko Takashima
2001	Yakuza Wives: Companions in Hell; Gokudō no Onna-tachi Jigoku no Michidzure (極道の妻たち 地獄の道づれ)	Ikuo Sekimoto	Koji Takada	Reiko Takashima
2005	Yakuza Wives: Flame of Love; Gokudō no Onna-tachi Jōen (極道の妻たち 情炎)	Hajime Hashimoto	Koji Takada	Reiko Takashima
2013	Yakuza Wives Neo; Gokudō no Tsuma-tachi Neo (極道の妻(つま)たち Neo)	Hideyuki Katsuki	Shōji Yonemura	Tomoka Kurotani
