= Utsu-P =

Japanese musician (born 1990)

- 鬱P
- Born: December 1, 1990 (age 35); Nagoya, Aichi, Japan
- Occupation: Musician
- Musical career
- Origin: Japan
- Genres: heavy metal; J-pop
- Instruments: Guitar; Bass guitar
- Years active: 2008–present
- Labels: KarenT, MY SONG IS SHIT, dmARTS
- Member of: The Ohayogozaimas
- Formerly of: Healthy Escape Association
- Website: youtube.com/@utsupofficial

Utsu-P (鬱P) (born December 1, 1990) is a Japanese musician. He is best known for his work using the Vocaloid voice synthesis software. In addition, Utsu-P has performed as a DJ and maintained two further musical projects; the metalcore band OHAYOGOZAIMAS, and the alternative idol group Zsasz.

== Biography and musical career ==
Utsu-P was born in Nagoya, Aichi Prefecture, Japan. He taught himself to play bass guitar to play with his high school friend, Nagi, who already knew how to play guitar.

In 2008, at the age of 17, Utsu-P began releasing music on the website Nico Nico Douga, making use of the VOCALOID voice bank Hatsune Miku. In August 2013, Utsu-P released his first nationally distributed album Warufuzake

In 2015, Utsu-P, along with guitarist Nagi, formed the melodic metalcore band OHAYOGOZAIMAS, for which he is the composer, bassist, and leader.

In 2019, Utsu-P formed the Japanese idol group Zsasz, debuting with their first track, Peter Peter which released on YouTube. In 2023, Zsasz announced their disbandment with their final live performance taking place on November 4.

In addition to his work with OHAYOGOZAIMAS and Zsasz, Utsu-P has written and produced songs for other acts and artists.

== Discography ==
=== Studio albums ===
Title	Album details
DOLL	Released: May 17, 2009; Label: MY SONG IS SHIT; Formats: CD
DIARRHEA	Released: November 15, 2009; Label: MY SONG IS SHIT; Format: CD
TRAUMATIC	Released: November 14, 2010; Label: MY SONG IS SHIT; Formats: CD, digital download
P	Released: March 27, 2011; Label: MY SONG IS SHIT, KARENT; Formats: CD, digital download
Doku e.p. (毒 e.p.)	Released: December 31, 2011; Label: MY SONG IS SHIT, KARENT; Formats: CD, digital download
MOKSHA	Released: April 28, 2012; Label: MY SONG IS SHIT, KARENT; Format: CD, digital download
Zoku e.p. (俗 e.p.)	Released: December 31, 2012; Label: MY SONG IS SHIT, KARENT; Formats: CD, digital download
CD-R	Released: July 7, 2013; Label: MY SONG IS SHIT, KARENT; Formats: CD, digital download
Warufuzake (悪巫山戯)	Released: August 7, 2013; Label: dmARTS; Formats: CD
Okazu (おかず)	Released: April 26, 2014; Label: MY SONG IS SHIT; Format: CD
ALGORITHM	Released: August 17, 2014; Label: MY SONG IS SHIT, KARENT; Formats: CD, digital download
Post-Traumatic Stress Disorder	Released: August 14, 2016; Label: MY SONG IS SHIT, KARENT; Formats: CD, digital download
GALAPAGOS	Released: August 11, 2017; Label: MY SONG IS SHIT, KARENT; Formats: CD, digital download
GREATEST SHITS	Released: August 10, 2018; Label: MY SONG IS SHIT, KARENT; Format: CD, digital download
RENAISSANCE	Released: August 10, 2019; Label: MY SONG IS SHIT, KARENT; Formats: CD, digital download
#SUPER_SHIBORIKASU	Released: April 9, 2020; Label: MY SONG IS SHIT; Formats: CD, digital download
UNIQUE	Released: October 23, 2021; Label: MY SONG IS SHIT, KARENT; Formats: CD, digital download
HAPPYPILLS	Released: August 23, 2023; Label: MY SONG IS SHIT, KARENT; Formats: CD, digital download
PERFECT PERSONA	Released: September 10, 2025; Label: KARENT; Formats: CD, digital download

=== Collaboration albums ===
Title	Album details
PSYCHODRAMA (with Sekihan)	Released: August 13, 2011; Label: MY SONG IS SHIT; Formats: CD, digital download
IDOLATRY (with Sekihan)	Released: August 11, 2015; Label: MY SONG IS SHIT; Format: CD, digital download
PUPPETEER (with Sekihan)	Released: March 14, 2025; Label: MY SONG IS SHIT; Formats: CD, digital download

=== With The Ohayogozaimas ===
Title	Album details
Monosugoi (ものすごい)	Released: December 31, 2015; Label: MY SONG IS SHIT; Formats: CD, digital download
No-Nonsense (のうなんせんす)	Released: December 31, 2016; Label: MY SONG IS SHIT; Format: CD, digital download
Maeda EP (前田EP)	Released: December 3, 2015; Label: MY SONG IS SHIT; Formats: CD, digital download
Design EP	Released: September 5, 2017; Label: MY SONG IS SHIT; Format: CD, digital download
Toku Ni Nashi (特になし)	Released: November 27, 2019; Label: MY SONG IS SHIT; Formats: CD, digital download
SEISHI (生死)	Released: May 3, 2022; Label: MY SONG IS SHIT; Format: CD, digital download
Stranger Six (奇奇奇奇奇奇)	Released: February 10, 2024; Label: MY SONG IS SHIT; Format: CD, digital download

=== With Zsasz ===
Title	Album details
Zsasz	Released: January 21, 2020; Label: Independent; Formats: CD, digital download
⸮ (Percontation Point)	Released: March 17, 2021; Label: Independent; Format: CD, digital download
Otaku No Uta (おたくのうた)	Released: November 17, 2021; Label: Independent; Formats: CD, digital download
Dark Hero (ダークヒーロー)	Released: July 13, 2022; Label: Independent; Format: CD, digital download
Ultra Heroine	Released: January 18, 2023; Label: Independent; Formats: CD, digital download
∄ (There Does Not Exist)	Released: October 18, 2023; Label: Independent; Format: CD, digital download

=== Songwriting and production credits ===
List of songs written by Utsu-P for other artists, showing year released, artist name, and name of the album
Song	Year	Artist	Album	Lyricist	Composer	Arranger
"Black Showtime" (ブラック・ショータイム)	2010	neko	Trapped in her eyes	Yes	Yes	Yes
"Shayou" (しゃよう)	2011	Gero	Gourmet	Yes	Yes	Yes
"Arinomama" (有りの侭)	2012	HEART THROB	Heart Throb – EP	Yes	Yes	No
"Minarai Hades" (見習いハーデス)	2012	Sekihan	Non-album single	Yes	Yes	Yes
"Baki" (刃牙)	2012	Sekihan	Non-album single	Yes	Yes	Yes
"Alice In Milkland" (アリスインミルクランド)	2013	Sekihan	"SekiBAN" (赤BAN)	No	Yes	Yes
"Mob"	2013	Gero, Diekyousaku (大凶作)	one	Yes	Yes	No
"Sugoi" (すごい)	2014	Nagi	Shiri kara detekuru konpi (尻からでてくるコンピ)	Yes	Yes	Yes
"Joushi No Uta" (情死の唄)	2014	Hanatan	Flowers BEST	Yes	Yes	Yes
"Kami Hikouki" (紙非行機)	2015	Ayaponzu＊, Vivienne (あやぽんず＊、びびあん)	Mimimi＊Trap! (みみmi＊トラップ！)	Yes	Yes	Yes
"UNTOUCHABLE GIRL"	2015	Hanatan	CIRCUS★CIRCUS	Yes	Yes	Yes
"Usagizumu" (ウサギズム)	2016	Himesaki Lily (ウサギズム)	Non-album single	Yes	Yes	Yes
"Saiseiron" (再生論)	2016	Q'ulle	ALIVE / Saisei Ron (ALIVE / 再生論)	No	Yes	Yes
"Unknown Unknown" (アンノーンアンノーン)	2016	Gero	Road	Yes	Yes	Yes
"Judo Motion" (ジュドーモーション)	2016	Kancell (かんせる)	Rogue Memory (ローグメモリー)	Yes	Yes	Yes
"BARKING CODE"	2016	Nobuhiko Okamoto	AKIBA'S BEAT SOUNDTRACK	No	Yes	Yes
"JIGOKU STATION CENTRAL GATE"	2017	000	Chunithm	Yes	Yes	Yes
"Mousou Teikoku Chikuonki" (妄想帝国蓄音機)	2018	Eri Kitamura	Mousou Teikoku Chikuonki (妄想帝国蓄音機)	No	Yes	Yes
"Suicide Prototype"	2018	Reina Ueda	The Caligula Effect: Overdose	Yes	Yes	Yes
"Otento-sama to dobunezumi" (お天道様とドブネズミ)	2018	Wolpis Kater (ウォルピスカーター)	Korekara mo Wolpis Sha no Teikyou de Okurishimasu. (これからもウォルピス社の提供でお送りします。)	Yes	Yes	Yes
"Executioner" (エクスキューショナー)	2019	Amenosei (アメノセイ)	Non-album single	Yes	Yes	Yes
"VILLAIN"	2019	Emiri Katou	Engage Princess	Yes	Yes	Yes
"Shinigami Holiday" (死神ホリディ)	2019	Devils Punk Inferno	Non-album single	No	Yes	Yes
"Gishiki" (ギシキ)	2019	BURST GIRL	Non-album single	Yes	Yes	Yes
"Knocking on jigoku no door" (ノッキング・オン・地獄のドア)	2021	Devils Punk Inferno	Non-album single	No	Yes	Yes
"Jirai no susume" (地雷のススメ)	2021	asameaco	I	Yes	Yes	Yes
"Montage" (モンタージュ)	2021	KAF	Mahou Gamma (魔法γ)	No	No	Yes
"My Roar" (マイロア)	2022	Tokoyami Towa	Scream	Yes	Yes	Yes
"RED OCEAN"	2022	Setono Toto (瀬戸乃とと)	Non-album single	Yes	Yes	Yes
"Vita" (ヴィータ)	2022	Gero	Parade	No	No	Yes
"Udon" (うどん)	2022	Gero	Parade	No	No	Yes
"God Willing"	2023	Alba Sera (アルバ・セラ)	Non-album single	Yes	Yes	Yes
"Cinderella Magic Stage" (シンデレラ・マジック・ステージ)	2023	irucaice	MY NEW GEAR presents DEN-ON-BU Remix13	No	No	Yes
"Shanti" (シャンティ)	2023	Gero	THE ORIGIN	No	No	Yes
"Alba" (アルバ)	2023	Gero	THE ORIGIN	No	No	Yes
"DEADWORLD"	2023	Tempus	Non-album single	No	Yes	Yes
"Fushin No Tane" (不信の種)	2023	Amane Momo	Fiorire	Yes	Yes	Yes
"Unhappiness Soul"	2023	LuciDream	EGO	No	Yes	Yes
"Aphrodite"	2024	Alba Sera (アルバ・セラ)	Kasuka (幽)	Yes	Yes	Yes
"Nibiiro no Kirameki" (鈍色のきらめき)	2024	Kumano BearTrice (熊乃ベアトリーチェ)	Non-album single	Yes	Yes	Yes
"Einherjar"	2024	Regalilia	Non-album single	Yes	Yes	Yes
"HappySideDishes"	2024	Tarachio	Non-album single	Yes	Yes	Yes
"Mannequin"	2024	LuciDream	PERSONA	No	Yes	Yes
