= Tokoyami Towa =

Hololive VTuber, esports player, and singer

- 常闇 トワ
- Tokoyami Towa as designed by Rurudo
- Occupations: VTuber; esports player; singer

YouTube information
- Channel: Towa Ch.Tokoyami Towa
- Years active: 2020–present
- Subscribers: 1.59 million
- Views: 536 million
- Last updated: 19 October 2026

Tokoyami Towa (Japanese: 常闇 トワ) is a Japanese VTuber, esports player, and singer affiliated with Cover Corporation's Hololive Production agency. She debuted in January 2020 as part of Hololive's 4th Generation. She is known for playing first-person shooter games, including as a two-time Apex Legends tournament champion and as a host for several game tournaments. She has also released two albums, Asher (2023) and Shin (2025), as well as numerous singles, and her work includes anime opening themes for Jack-of-All-Trades, Party of None and The Exiled Heavy Knight Knows How to Game the System.

== Overview ==
Tokoyami Towa's lore describes her as a devil who goes on a study trip to the human world, but becomes interested in video games and streaming. Her illustrator is Rurudo. She also wears a hat which is in reality her pet Bibi. Inside Games remarked that "her character design blends cuteness with an androgynous flair".

Tokoyami is a member of Hololive's Generation 4, and one of only three active members (alongside Tsunomaki Watame and Himemori Luna). Her fandom name is the Tokoyami Kenzoku (常闇眷属; lt. "Tokoyami underlings"). She is also known by the nickname "Towa-sama Maji Tenshi" (トワ様マジ天使; lt. "Mistress Towa is a true angel."), sometimes abbreviated as TMT.

== Career ==
Tokoyami Towa was announced as one of the five members of Hololive's Generation 4 on 25 December 2019, with her YouTube debut stream on 3 January 2020. In April 2022, she reached one million subscribers. By October 2023, she had reached 1.3 million subscribers.

=== Streaming career ===
Tokoyami specializes in game streams, and is especially skilled at first-person shooter games. Although she was playing Apex Legends and Overwatch by March 2020, first-person shooter streaming was rare in Hololive. However, with her amidst people staying-in due to the COVID-19 pandemic, she elevated the profile of first-person shooters in Hololive, hosting a July 2020 watch party for an Apex Legends tournament. Niji Kusano cites her as one of the most skilled first-person shooter players in Hololive.

In addition to first-person shooters, Tokoyami has also streamed fighting, music, and racing games. as well as casual chat streams and a music show. According to Kusano, she uses both straight one and funny one roles in comedic skits, and she is a rare example of a "sensible" Hololive character.

=== Esports career ===
Tokoyami has frequently appeared in tournaments for the game Apex Legends, including several hosted by Crazy Raccoon. In January 2021, she was runner-up for VTuber Saikyō Ketteisen, teaming with Natsuiro Matsuri. After her team Voruto was runner-up at the 4th Crazy Raccoon Cup Apex Legends in March 2021, she won the 7th Crazy Raccoon Cup Apex Legends tournament in October 2021 with her team Candy Pop alongside CPT and VSPO! member Kurumi Noah. In April 2022, she led the Startend team at VTuber Saikyō Ketteisen ver. Apex Legends Season 4 featuring Hololive teammates Minato Aqua and Hoshimachi Suisei, releasing a tie-in cover of the Orangestar song "Asu no Yozora Shōkaihan". In January 2023, she won a second Crazy Raccoon Apex Legends tournament with her team Wagamama's, featuring Nijisanji VTuber Ex Albio and gamer Selly. Kusano has cited her among several VTubers who helped grow Japan's esports industry as a tournament player. Her esports coach Ras has also appeared in her streams.

Tokoyami has also been involved as a player of Street Fighter 6. In October 2024, she launched her "Apprentice Travel Plan" (弟子旅企画, Deshi Tabi Kikaku) collaboration with her Street Fighter 6 coach Tachikawa. In September 2025, Tokoyami organized Tokoyami-sai (常闇祭), a three-on-three Street Fighter 6 tournament; with a capacity of 1,500 participants reached, 512 teams were selected out of more than 900 applicants. In June 2026, she participated in VTuber Saikyō Ketteisen ver. Street Fighter 6: Act II, but withdrew following a brief hiatus due to health issues, which she later disclosed was diagnosed as a suspected case of Ménière's disease.

Every January from 2021 to 2024, Tokoyami hosted the Hololive New Year Cup (ホロお正月CUP, Horo Oshōgatsu Kappu) where talents from all female Hololive branches raced in an annual Mario Kart 8 Deluxe tournament. In January 2025, citing time constraints regarding practice and the pressure involved for all talents, Tokoyami replaced the Cup with the Holo Shinshun Game Matsuri (ホロ新春ゲーム祭; lt. "Holo[live] New Years' Game Festival"), a new tournament with a larger variety of video games, where Hololive talents were organized into four teams. The 2026 tournament was a six-hour gaming marathon where the four teams were based on the kachōfūgetsu idiom. She also appears in Overwatch tournaments, and has been cited as the founder of the OW Joshi-bu (OW女子部), a set of female VTubers interested in the game.

=== Music career ===
In October 2020, Tokoyami and Roboco-san co-hosted Hololive's second Cinderella Switch concert, marking the first time she took the stage solo. In February 2021, Tokoyami released her first original song "Palette", which she wrote; it later received a music video the next month. Made Agus Indra Kusumawijaya and Ni Wayan Meidariani noted that "Palette" was centered on unfettered motivation, based on a literary studies analysis through nine types of isotopies and two motifs. Writing for Kai-You, Kusano cited hard rock as an inspiration for the song. In January 2022, she released Scream, her first EP, with music from Anchor, R Sound Design, Surii, and Utsu-P.

In September 2023, Tokoyami released her debut album Aster. Tokoyami explained in an interview that Aster has a "hidden theme that I encourage everyone to speculate about". In October 2023, her first solo concert, "Break Your XXX", was held at Tachikawa Stage Garden.

Tokoyami released a second album, Shin, on 8 October 2025. A second solo concert, SHINier, was held on 29 October 2025; footage from that concert was later used for the music video for her song "Invisible", released the next month. In December 2025, Tokoyami stated that she had to borrow money from Cover Corp to organize SHINier. In 2026, she performed "Shirube", the first season of the Jack-of-All-Trades, Party of None anime, and "Rewrite the Answer", the second season of the The Exiled Heavy Knight Knows How to Game the System anime.

Tokoyami peaked at #64 on the Billboard Japan Artist 100. She has been noted for her alto voice, with Kusano calling her a rare example of a deep voice in Hololive.

== Discography ==
=== Albums ===
| Title | Album details | Peak chart positions | | | | | |
| Title | Album details | JPN | JPN Comb. | JPN Dg. | JPN Hot | JPN Top | JPN DL |
|---|---|---|---|---|---|---|---|
| Aster | Released: 27 September 2023; Label: Cover Corp | 8 | 8 | 3 | 7 | 8 | 2 |
| Shin (stylized in all-caps) | Released: 8 October 2025; Label: Cover Corp | 4 | 5 | 4 | 56 | 5 | 4 |
"—" denotes releases that did not chart or were not released in that region.

=== Extended plays ===
| Title | Album details | Peak chart positions | |
| Title | Album details | JPN Dg. | JPN DL |
|---|---|---|---|
| Scream | Released: 4 January 2022; Label: Cover Corp | 6 | 34 |
"—" denotes releases that did not chart or were not released in that region.

=== Singles ===
| Title | Year | Peak chart positions | | | | Album |
| Title | Year | JPN | JPN Dig. | JPN Sales | JPN DL | Album |
|---|---|---|---|---|---|---|
| "Palette" | 2021 | — | — | — | 35 | Scream |
| "Raimei" (ライメイ) (stylized in low-caps) | 2023 | — | 34 | — | 31 | Aster |
| "U.F.O.: U Feel Overjoyed!" (stylized as "U.F.O. – U Feel Overjoyed! –)" | 2023 | — | — | — | — | Non-album single |
| "Anemone" (stylized in all-caps) | 2023 | — | 43 | — | 53 | Aster |
| "Sanvitalia" (サンビタリア) | 2023 | — | 45 | — | 72 | Aster |
| "S.T.Y." | 2024 | — | — | — | 100 | Non-album single |
| "My Abyss" | 2025 | — | — | — | 56 | Shin |
| "Bazubi Bazab" (バズビバザヴ) (stylized in all-caps) | 2025 | — | 31 | — | 34 | Shin |
| "ChewyChewy" | 2025 | — | 37 | — | 39 | Shin |
| "Shirube" (シルべ) | 2026 | 20 | — | 21 | 60 | Non-album single |
| "Smash It Up" (stylized as "SM4SH IT UP") | 2026 | — | — | — | 99 | Non-album single |
| "Rewrite the Answer" | 2026 | — | 16 | — | 19 | Non-album single |
| "Shallow Shadow" | 2026 | — | — | — | — | Non-album single |
"—" denotes releases that did not chart or were not released in that region.
