= Shōko Ieda =

Japanese writer

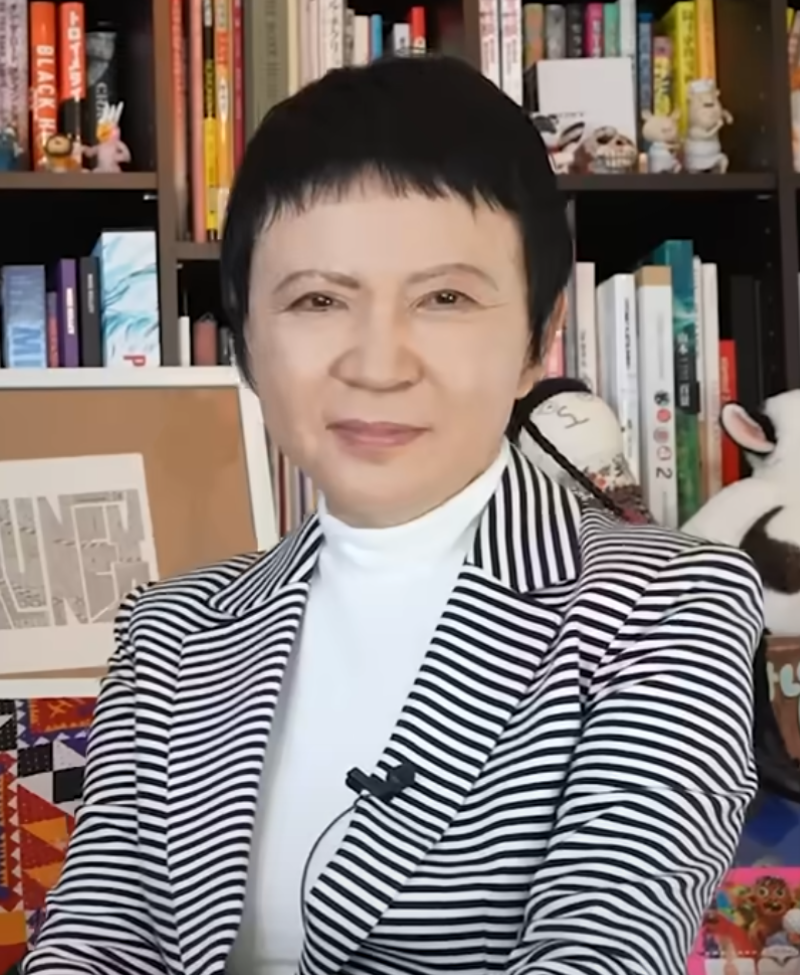
- Born: 1958 (age 67–68); Aichi Prefecture, Japan
- Occupation: Writer
- Writing career
- Period: 1985 – present
- Genre: Nonfiction

Shōko Ieda (家田 荘子, Ieda Shōko; born 1958 in Aichi Prefecture, Japan) is a Japanese writer of non-fiction. She is known for titillating novels replete with interracial sex scenes, and has aroused a great deal of controversy in Japan; her works have been accused of "demonising female sexuality".

== Career ==
Ieda rose to public prominence through her 1986 book Gokudō no Tsuma-tachi, about the girlfriends and spouses of yakuza. She spent nearly a year getting to know her subjects, and had also been shot at during the course of writing the book. It was later adapted into the Yakuza Wives film series by Toei, which initially starred Shima Iwashita, and later Reiko Takashima. Her books continued to receive a good popular reception and be made into movies; her 1990 Hug Me, Kiss Me was awarded the 22nd Ohya Non-fiction Prize in 1991. Hug Me, Kiss Me was an account of her time volunteering in organization offering assistance to AIDS patients while living in Savannah, Georgia in 1987, along with an epilogue about the risk AIDS posed to Japanese tourists in Hawaii; its cinematic adaptation was the first film in Japan to openly address AIDS. However, her descriptions of the African American community were accused of making AIDS seem "alien" and "distant" to her Japanese target audience.

Ieda's later works continued her practice of touching on contentious themes; her 1991 book Yellow Cab, about the eponymous stereotype of Japanese women overseas who allegedly engaged in indiscriminate sex with foreigners, attracted a great deal of media attention in Japan, including two television documentaries by TV Asahi and Tokyo Broadcasting System. George Sarratt, her research assistant for the book, later denounced major portions as "fraudulent", even indicating that she had altered direct quotes from interviewees. Japanese women in New York also set up a protest group against the book, feeling that the stereotype had damaged their professional image; their activities, which were described as "Ieda-bashing" by one scholar studying the "yellow cab" phenomenon, resulted in a sharp decline in her literary reputation.

Despite the negative attention she received for Yellow Cab, Ieda continued to produce popular works; her 1994 novel Women Who Slept with the Bubble was made into a series of movies, the newest of which, starring Yoko Mitsuya, was released in June 2007.

== Selected works ==
- Ieda, Shōko (August 1985). 俺の肌に群がった女たち (Ore no hada ni muragatta onnatachi). Futami Shobō. ISBN 4-576-85049-0.
- Ieda, Shōko (August 1986). 極道の妻たち (Gokudō no Tsuma-tachi). Bungei Shunjū. ISBN 4-16-340800-2.
- Ieda, Shōko (November 1990). 私を抱いてそしてキスして―エイズ患者と過した一年の壮絶記録 (Hug Me, Kiss Me: A heroic record of my year with AIDS patients). Bungei Shunjū. ISBN 4-16-344770-9.
- Ieda, Shōko (December 1991). イエローキャブ―成田を飛び立った女たち (Yellow Cab: The women who took off at Narita). Kōdansha. ISBN 4-06-264954-3.
- Ieda, Shōko (November 1992). ラブ・ジャンキー―日本発タイ行"性"の直行便 (Love Junkies: Direct sex flight from Japan to Thailand). Shūeisha. ISBN 4-08-780170-5.
- Ieda, Shōko (March 1994). バブルと寝た女たち (Women who slept with the bubble). Kōdansha. ISBN 4-06-206842-7.
- Ieda, Shōko (August 1999). 産めない女に価値はない? (Are Infertile Women Worthless?). Fusōsha. ISBN 4-594-02724-5.
