= Gokudō =

Japanese film genre

Gokudō (極道) is a Japanese word whose contemporary main usage may be translated as lowlife.

== In film ==
In film the word is often associated with yakuza films and the use of sex and violence. Various films, including films by Takashi Miike, include the word in their titles but it is difficult to assert it is a genre or subgenre.

== See also ==
- Gokudo
