= Gokudō Parasites =

Japanese manga series

- First tankōbon volume cover

極道パラサイツ (Gokudō Parasaitsu)
- Genre: Comedy
- Manga
- Written by: Ume Matsutake
- Illustrated by: Lee Brocco
- Published by: Square Enix
- Imprint: YG Comics
- Magazine: Young Gangan
- Original run: January 18, 2019 – September 3, 2021
- Volumes: 6
- icon

Gokudō Parasites (Japanese: 極道パラサイツ, Hepburn: Gokudō Parasaitsu) is a Japanese manga series written by Ume Matsutake and illustrated by Lee Brocco. It was serialized in Square Enix's seinen manga magazine Young Gangan from January 2019 to September 2021, with its chapters collected in six tankōbon volumes.

== Publication ==
Written by Ume Matsutake and illustrated by Lee Brocco, Gokudō Parasites was serialized in Square Enix's seinen manga magazine Young Gangan from January 18, 2019, to September 3, 2021. Square Enix collected its chapters in six tankōbon volumes, released from August 24, 2019, to November 25, 2021.

=== Volumes ===
No.	Release date	ISBN
1	August 24, 2019	978-4-7575-6257-8
2	January 23, 2020	978-4-7575-6481-7
3	June 25, 2019	978-4-7575-6711-5
4	November 25, 2020	978-4-7575-6961-4
5	May 25, 2021	978-4-7575-7269-0
6	November 25, 2021	978-4-7575-7597-4
