= Kamisato Ayaka =

Fictional character from Genshin Impact

- Genshin Impact character
- Kamisato Ayaka in Genshin Impact
- First game: Genshin Impact (2021)
- Voiced by: EN: Erica Mendez; ZH: Xiao N; JA: Saori Hayami; KO: Lee Yoo-ri

In-universe information
- Weapon: Katana (Note: She wields a katana in the lore, but she can use any sword in gameplay.)
- Origin: Inazuma
- Element: Cryo

Kamisato Ayaka (Chinese: 神里绫华; pinyin: Shénlǐ Línghuá) is a character from the video game Genshin Impact, developed by miHoYo. In the game, she is the daughter of the prestigious Kamisato clan, which runs the Yashiro Commission in Inazuma, and is responsible for managing the family's affairs. Local residents respectfully refer to her as the "Shirasagi Himegimi" (Japanese: 白鷺の姫君, Hepburn: Shirasagi no Himegimi; lit. 'White Heron Princess'). (Note: "Shirasagi Himegimi" is the official term used in the game's English translation.)

Kamisato Ayaka is the female lead of the Inazuma chapter of the game's main story. She appears throughout the quest and consistently uses her influence to help the game's protagonist, the Traveler. As an important character in Inazuma, Ayaka has been popular among players, and commentators have responded positively to her visual design and combat performance.

== Design and voice acting ==
Kamisato Ayaka is the refined daughter of a prominent Inazuman family. She is considerate toward the public and earned the nickname "Shirasagi Himegimi", but she also retains the sensibilities of an ordinary young woman: she enjoys novel experiences and lively festivals, and is willing to oppose social injustice. Ayaka is skilled in many arts, particularly swordsmanship, and is knowledgeable about weapon-forging; when crafting weapon-related materials, players have a chance to obtain double the output. Ayaka's appearance draws on Japanese culture: her clothing and hair ornaments evoke samurai armor and helmets; her outfit bears a lotus-like family crest; and her necklace features a gold cherry-blossom pendant. Her combat movements likewise reflect samurai fighting styles, and her character demo depicts her wielding a katana. Her animations were produced with motion capture technology, with miHoYo president Liu Wei (a.k.a. Dawei) also participating in the production.

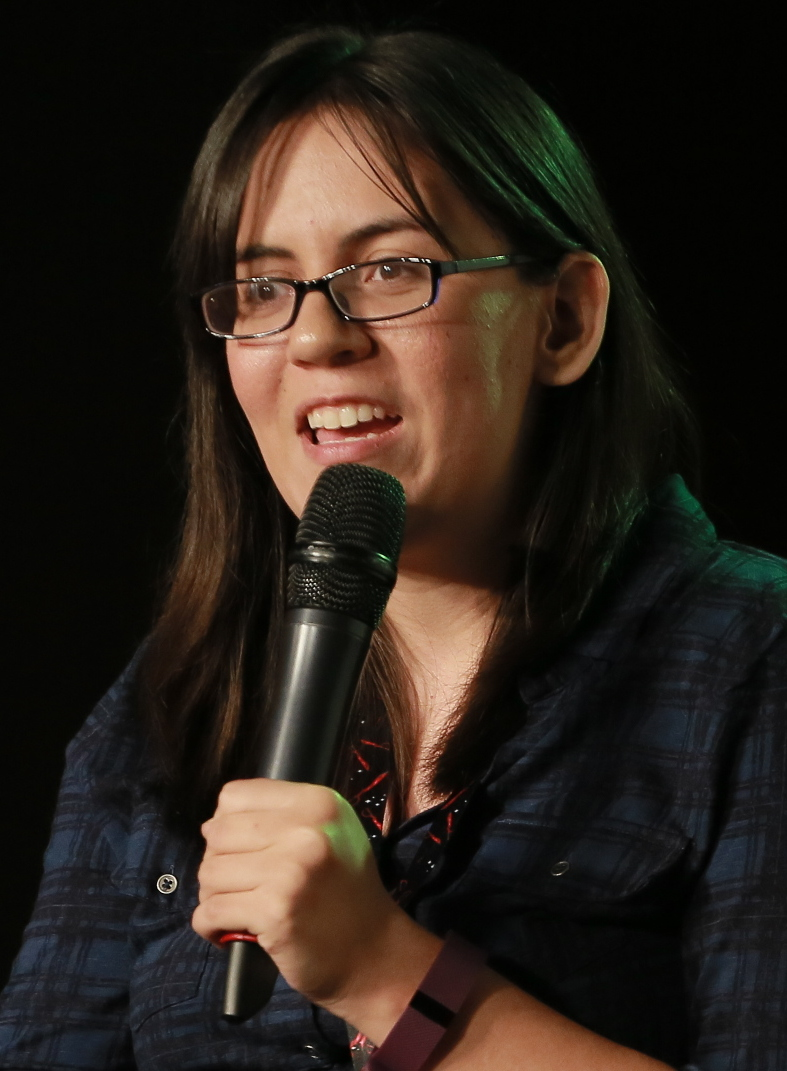
Erica Mendez, Ayaka's English voice actress, in 2015

Ayaka's Chinese voice actress is Xiao N. During the blind audition stage for the game's characters, Xiao N auditioned for the role of Xiangling as well as Razor in addition to Ayaka, and was selected to voice both Xiangling and Ayaka in a single round. During the beta period, the production team only provided a broad outline of Ayaka's background and her character art as reference material for the performance. As Inazuma's content and Ayaka's story were gradually developed, the actress, voice director and production team decided to re-record her lines before release. To match Ayaka's intended age more accurately, the revised performance used a younger-sounding voice compared to the earlier version. Ayaka's English voice actress is Erica Mendez. In an interview, Mendez said that many lines were re-recorded between the beta and official release, with some changes to the performance style as well. Ayaka is voiced in Japanese by Saori Hayami. Hayami said that Ayaka's early recordings consisted only of basic battle lines and monologues with no dialogue-heavy material, which initially made the character seem somewhat rigid. It was only when she later recorded Ayaka's story dialogue that she discovered another side to the character. She said that most of Ayaka's lines convey an impression of meticulousness and orderliness. Ayaka is voiced in Korean by Lee Yoo-ri.

== Appearances ==
=== Lore ===
Kamisato Ayaka is the female lead of the Inazuma chapter of the game's main storyline. She appears throughout the arc and consistently uses her influence to assist the Traveler. She is the daughter of the Kamisato clan, a prestigious family that leads the Yashiro Commission. The Yashiro Commission is in charge of overseeing Inazuma's shrines, festivals and cultural events. Ayaka is highly regarded among the citizens of Inazuma. Although she serves under the Raiden Shogun, Ayaka opposes the Vision Hunt Decree, which is the Shogun's policy of confiscating Visions, (Note: A Vision is a magical device used to manipulate the elements.) and Ayaka secretly aids Vision bearers within Inazuma. Ayaka had long heard of the Traveler's prior actions in Mondstadt and Liyue, and hoped that their arrival in Inazuma, which was at the time an isolationist nation, could bring change there. She sent her retainer Thoma to receive the Traveler on behalf of the Yashiro Commission and sought their help. The Traveler initially declined Ayaka's request, but she assigned them three commissions that showed the Vision Hunt Decree's impact on the people of Inazuma and changed their mind. The Traveler then joined an operation to rescue Vision bearers imprisoned by the Tenryou Commission.

As the Vision Hunt Decree intensified, the Tenryou Commission captured Thoma. Distraught, Ayaka attempted to rescue him from the public execution he was set to face, but the Traveler stopped her. The Traveler then rescued Thoma in Ayaka's place, becoming wanted by the Tenryou Commission and, as a result, joining the resistance forces. During an attempt by Yae Miko to get Kujou Sara (one of the Shogun's generals) to change sides, the Traveler reunited with Ayaka and, with her help, stole documents that could be used to convince Sara to do so. After Inazuma's Sakoku Decree was lifted, Ayaka took charge of organizing a cultural event known as the Irodori Festival.

In Ayaka's story quest, after leaving Komore Teahouse in Inazuma City, the Traveler joins Ayaka while investigating Tsubaki, a mysterious name found in Ayaka's late mother's belongings. To prepare a gift, they seek silk for a custom kimono, helping the International Trade Association recover stolen fabric from rōnin along the way. While waiting for the kimono, Ayaka spends time with the Traveler, revealing her loneliness and limited social experience; after a failed cooking attempt, the Traveler helps her make mushroom pizza. Eventually, Ayaka discovers that Tsubaki was not another person but an identity used by her mother, representing the wishes she could not pursue because of her duties with the Yashiro Commission. Inspired by this, Ayaka resolves to live her life without regrets, invites the Traveler to a festival, shares their hopes on a prayer panel, and ends the day by performing a heartfelt dance to thank them for their friendship.

=== Gameplay ===
Kamisato Ayaka is a five-star Cryo character who uses a sword. She is designed as an offensive character with strong damage output; both her Elemental Skill and Elemental Burst deal Cryo area-of-effect damage. She also has a unique movement ability, which allows her to move across water. When the ability ends, it temporarily infuses her weapon with Cryo damage.

== Promotion and reception ==
Kamisato Ayaka was a playable character during Genshin Impact's first closed beta test and the first playable character from Inazuma to be publicly revealed. She first appeared at the 2019 G-STAR gaming exhibition in South Korea, where miHoYo debuted the PC version of the game and announced her as one of the game's playable characters. Ayaka's Japanese-inspired design stood out noticeable from those of the eleven other characters revealed at the time. On June 7, 2021, miHoYo released artwork for Ayaka on social media. During a promotional livestream on July 9, it was confirmed that Ayaka would appear in version 2.0 of the game. On July 15, miHoYo released her character teaser, introducing her as the daughter of the Kamisato clan, a prestigious business administration family in the Inazuma region. A character demo followed on July 20, showcasing her attacks and abilities, and a web event launched six days later, in which players could select an elaborate gift for her from Inazuma's shops. Ahead of Ayaka's second banner run, miHoYo held a fan-art contest for the character on Twitter. It later released a story short depicting her childhood and showing how a duel with her brother Ayato changed the course of her life.

On September 5, 2022, Genshin Impact would announce a collaboration with the Chinese tea drink chain Hey Tea, introducing a branded drink themed after Ayaka and Ayato with badges, stands, and in-game item redemption codes as rewards to those who participated in the promotion. Reception among Chinese audiences was strong and met with praise to where at one point, the product was sold out due to exceeded demand.

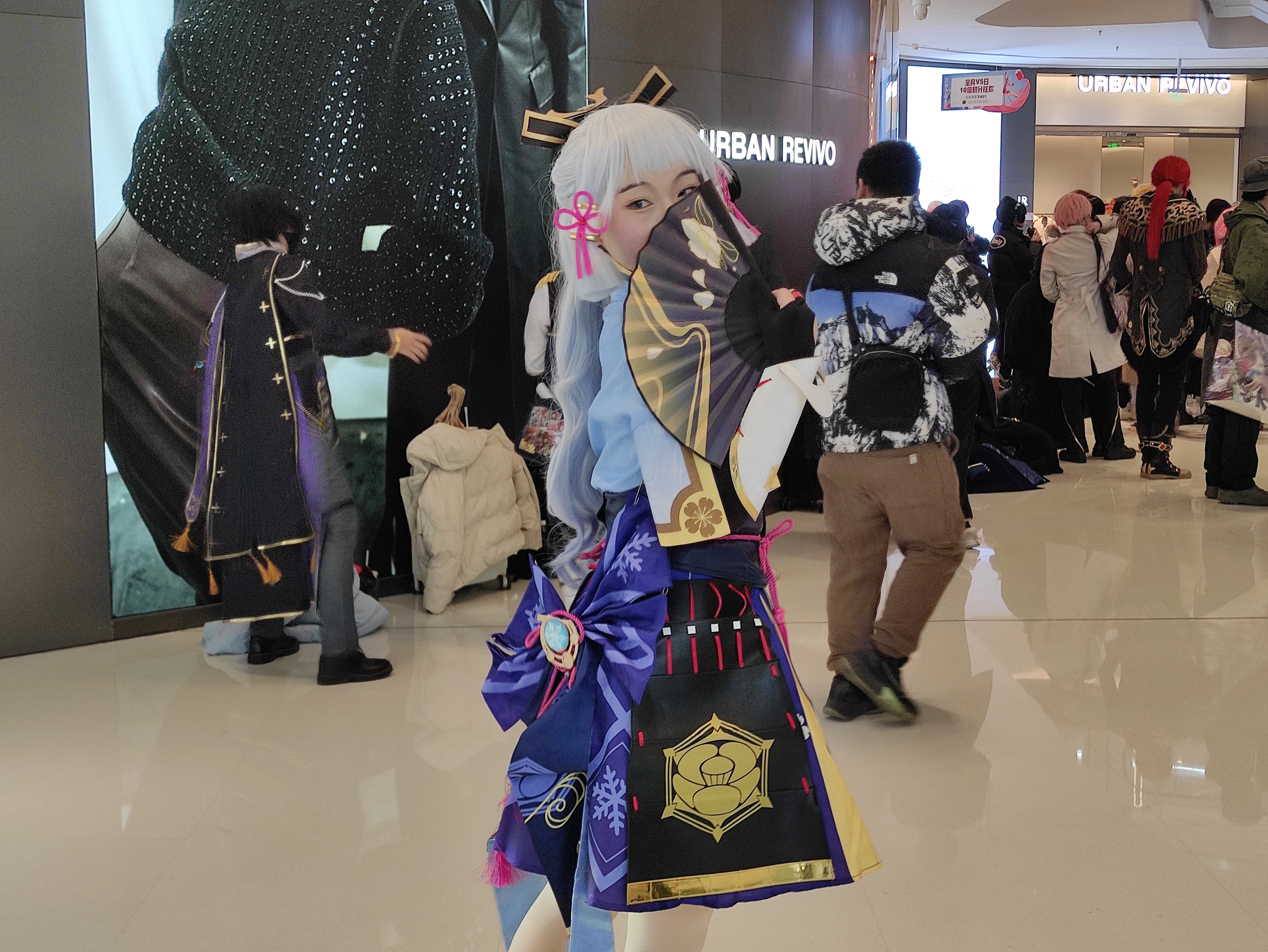
Cosplay of Kamisato Ayaka

As one of the earliest characters introduced during the game's beta testing period, Kamisato Ayaka became a subject of discussion among players early on, and players and gaming media continued to follow when she would be officially released. TheGamer writer Kyle Gorges considered her to be one of the most eagerly anticipated and least controversial characters in the game's history; despite undergoing several adjustments before release, she was consistently well received afterward. In an August 2021 survey by Japanese gaming outlet INSIDE asking which Inazuma character respondents wanted to obtain the most, Ayaka placed second with nearly 20% of the vote, behind only the Raiden Shogun. Following her release, Ayaka inspired fan works. Game Rant reported on a Reddit user, Yexlir, who created and shared a pixel-art animation inspired by her Elemental Skill. The banner generated more than US$30,000,000 for miHoYo via the App Store in mainland China alone. Game Rant editor Hajrudin Krdzic attributed players' spending to two factors: the COVID-19 pandemic had delayed the start of version 2.7, making Ayaka's rerun the longest-lasting banner since the game's launch, and Ayaka was also among the game's strongest damage dealers. Students at the University of California, Berkeley also reenacted Ayaka's dance from the game in hopes that the ritual would help them obtain her. Fans have expressed appreciation for the character via cosplay.

Rock Paper Shotgun writer Amelia Zollner called Ayaka elegant and flawless, saying that adding her to a player's team would make it significantly stronger. Screen Rant editor Quinn Geiger wrote that version 2.0's character stories for Yoimiya and Ayaka allowed players to gain a deeper understanding of the new characters' personalities. However, some players were dissatisfied with part of Ayaka's story quest: after she seeks to repay the Traveler for their help by offering them a kimono, the game only gives the player an option to refuse, which players found regrettable. Siliconera editor Jenni Lada wrote that the two character stories not only helped players better understand the characters, but also introduced Inazuma's culture and society; learning the characters' experiences helps explain why their personal sense of duty drives them to oppose the Raiden Shogun's Vision Hunt Decree.

Ayaka's gameplay design received positive commentary. Game Rant editor Nahda Nabiilah wrote that, when Ayaka was first released, players often criticized her Elemental Burst as difficult to use and considered her damage insufficient. Players later recognized her potential, however: with proper investment, Ayaka could become one of the strongest characters in the game. VG247 writer Josh Broadwell said that Ayaka has the potential to serve as a team's main damage dealer. He noted that such characters are generally built either around physical damage or elemental reactions, while Ayaka's skills and abilities accommodate both approaches; players can choose to build her as a damage dealer combining physical and Cryo damage. Commentators also noted her distinctive movement mechanic; Lada praised it for increasing Ayaka's value as a character to build, and welcomed the addition of a character who could be useful immediately upon being obtained.
