= Venti =

Venti may refer to:

- Venti (software), a network storage system
- Venti, a character in 2020 video game Genshin Impact
- A coffee cup size at Starbucks
- The Roman equivalent of the Greek Anemoi gods of the wind
