= 3dm =

3dm or 3DM may refer to:

- 3dm, a tool for performing three-way merging and file comparison of XML files
- 3DM, a Chinese video game piracy group
- 3-dimensional matching, in graph theory
- .3dm, the file format of Rhinoceros 3D graphics software
