= Anne Yatco =

American voice actress

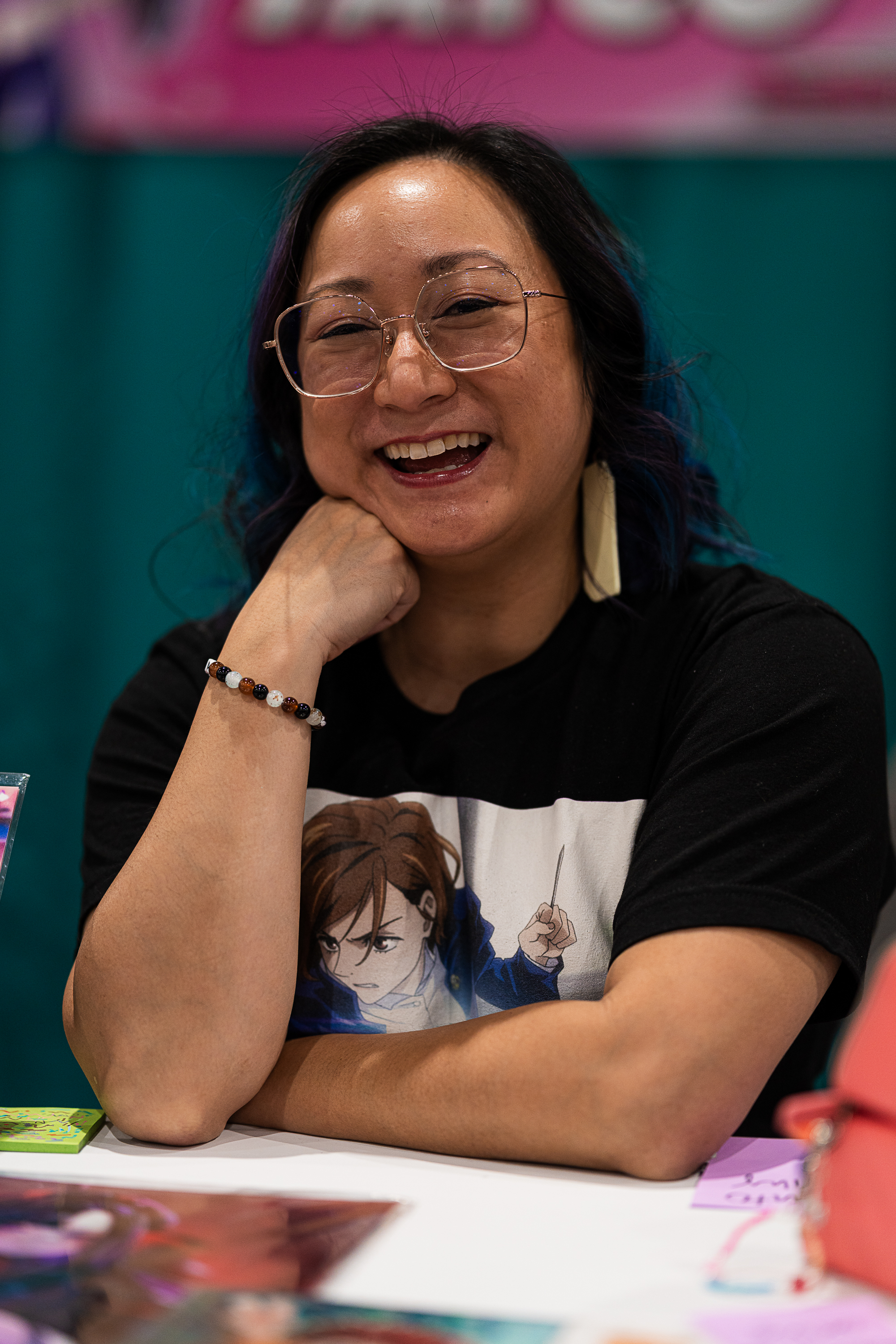
- Yatco at Animate! Raleigh in 2026
- Born: Anne Josephine Yatco; June 3, 1984 (age 42); Morris, Illinois, U.S.
- Education: Marquette University (B.S.); California Institute of the Arts (M.F.A.)
- Occupation: Voice actress
- Years active: 2016–present
- Website: https://www.anneyatco.com/

Anne Josephine Yatco (born June 3, 1984) is an American voice actress. She voices Nobara Kugisaki in the English dub of Jujutsu Kaisen, Raiden Shogun in Genshin Impact, Bambietta Basterbine in Bleach: Thousand-Year Blood War, Ms. Ames in Class of '09, Princess Ruto in The Legend of Zelda: Ocarina of Time, and Chie Satonaka in Persona 4 Revival.

== Early life and education ==
Yatco grew up in Morris, Illinois. She is of Filipino heritage. In 2002, she moved to Milwaukee to attend Marquette University, where she earned a B.S. in biomedical engineering while taking theatre classes outside her major. She went on to receive an M.F.A. in acting from the California Institute of the Arts.

After graduate school, Yatco worked for about seven years as a forensic scientist doing accident reconstruction. She continued acting during this period, performing in plays and improv and taking voice acting classes.

== Career ==
Yatco's first voice role was Hiromi Shirahane in Kuromukuro in 2016. Her other anime credits include Lilian in Violet Evergarden, Rokume in Beastars, and Izumi Koushiro in the 2020 Digimon Adventure reboot. She also voices Sabine Dupain-Cheng in Miraculous: Tales of Ladybug & Cat Noir after the death of Philece Sampler.

In video games, aside from the Raiden Shogun in Genshin Impact, her credits include Final Fantasy VII Remake, Ghostwire: Tokyo, NEO: The World Ends with You, Wasteland 3, and Class of '09.

Yatco has also worked in theatre. Her stage credits include productions at the Kennedy Center, the Edinburgh Festival Fringe, and the Kirk Douglas Theatre.
