= Raiden Shogun =

Fictional character in a video game

- Genshin Impact character
- Raiden Shogun in Genshin Impact
- First game: Genshin Impact (2021)
- Voiced by: EN: Anne Yatco; ZH: Juhuahua; JA: Miyuki Sawashiro; KO: Park Ji-yoon

In-universe information
- Aliases: Raiden Ei, Beelzebul, Baal
- Title: Almighty Narukami Ogosho, God of Thunder
- Weapon: Polearm (in combat); Sword (in lore)
- Origin: Inazuma
- Element: Electro

The Raiden Shogun (Chinese: 雷电将军; pinyin: Léidiàn Jiāngjūn) is a character from Genshin Impact, a 2020 action role-playing gacha game developed by miHoYo. Added in a 2021 update for the game, she was initially a boss enemy for players to fight, and then later released as a playable character. In all appearances the character is voiced by Anne Yatco in English, Juhuahua in Chinese, Miyuki Sawashiro in Japanese, and Park Ji-yoon in Korean.

Within the game's story, she is the ruling Archon of the game's Inazuma region. Consisting of two separate beings, the puppet body "Shogun" and the consciousness of Archon Raiden Ei (雷电影; Léidiàn Yǐng), she originally acts as an authoritarian and stern ruler. As the game's story unfolds the two aspects come into conflict with one another, and in the aftermath the Raiden Shogun adopts a more forward thinking approach to governing her nation.

The Raiden Shogun was positively received upon release, with players creating memes based on her portrayal and inability to cook, and has been one of the highest revenue generating characters for miHoYo. This has led to several studies to understand her appeal, some of which attributed it to the heavy Japanese influences of her design, while others focused on the character's sex appeal. She has also been discussed in regards to the quality of the game's story, and in criticism of its localization. Her story arc as a whole has been praised by some for its depth and portrayal of both grief, as well as the conflict between emotion and logic, but there has been criticism aimed at its handling and portrayal of Ei's personality.

== Conception and creation ==
Created for Genshin Impact by miHoYo, the Raiden Shogun went through multiple modifications, with miHoYo noting that they spent the most time refining her out of any character at that time, to ensure the multiple teams involved were all working with a shared idea of how to proceed forward. Her combat animations took influence from Kendo swordsmanship, paying careful attention to her upper and lower body posture as well as sword position to portray her as "serene, dignified and exquisite." In particular her ultimate attack is based on the postures of hassō-no-kamae, jōdan-no-kamae, and gedan-no-kamae, as well as movements such as the noutou.

Designed as both a boss and a playable character for the game, her boss fight was designed to deny players the use of their regular attacks and skills to help illustrate her immense power as an Archon, while also creating a sense of "oppression and despair" for the player. At the same time, they wanted to give players a sense they could gradually overcome the boss fight through perseverance. Meanwhile, they also wanted to give her a sense of someone "who carries the dreams of her people with her". To this end, her playable version can buff teammates, intended to reflect an adaptation to the game's "visions" and "wishes" mechanics.

=== Design and voice ===
Standing approximately 5 feet 5 inches (166 cm) tall, the Raiden Shogun is a woman with pale skin, bluish purple hair that forms a long braid past her waist, and bangs above her eyes. The Raiden Shogun's design takes elements from Japanese culture, specifically Raijin, the lightning god in Japanese mythology, reflected in the character's name and her abilities. Her clothing consists of a purple kimono resembling a yukata, held by an obi around her waist, while mitsudomoe symbols are featured prominently in her design. The kimono forms a miniskirt after her waist, with long purple stockings covering her legs and thighs, while black sleeves extend to her fingers. On the right side of her head are several blue violet flowers with a miniature fan above her ear, while additional flowers and a garter are strapped to her left leg and thigh respectively.

She is voiced by Juhuahua in Chinese, Miyuki Sawashiro in Japanese, and Park Ji-yoon in Korean. Meanwhile, her English voice actress, Anne Yatco, initially auditioned for almost all the available female characters being added to Genshin Impact at the time. As the character has two different aspects to her personality, she portrayed the "Shogun" aspect as "cold and unemotional, but not emotionless" and "not a robot". Meanwhile, the "Raiden" aspect she found easier, portraying her more naturally but also keeping in mind her aspect as an immortal ruler, but noted she was directed not to make the character sound "too mature". She added that she enjoyed voicing women who were "large and in charge" after being heavily impressed with the character's first cutscene prior to dubbing her, and rounded the vowels in a "light British" accent to sound more regal.

== Appearances ==
Appearing in action role-playing gacha game Genshin Impact in July 2021, the character is introduced as Baal, the Archon ruler of Inazuma on the fictional world of Teyvat. Initially encountered as a stern and authoritarian ruler, in line with her goal of "pursuing eternity," she enacted various policies to consolidate her control over the nation, including the isolationist "Sakoku Decree." During the course of the game's story it is revealed that the actual "Baal", whose real name is Makoto, was killed 500 years prior to the game's main story. The fake "Baal" is revealed to be the Raiden Shogun, a combination of two characters: Raiden Ei, Makoto's identical twin sister, and the Shogun, a bionic puppet which she created. Also known as Beelzebul, Ei hid her consciousness inside the puppet to avoid another tragedy, secluding herself from the outside world in what she calls the "Plane of Euthymia."

As part of the game's "Transient Dreams" questline, Ei comes into conflict with the puppet's programming after attempting to adopt a different course of governance, due to her having previously programmed the puppet to resist any future change in an attempt to prevent the erosion of her personality. Eventually, the Shogun is defeated and decides to allow Ei to repeal her policies, adopting a more forward-thinking governance instead. She later joins all of Teyvat in protecting the world against a threat from the floating island of Celestia and Teyvat's ruler, the Heavenly Principles.

Introduced into the game as a playable character with the title "the Almighty Narukami Ogosho, God of Thunder", the Raiden Shogun's attacks are designed to buff nearby allies when she attacks with her "Baleful Light" Elemental skill, dealing "Electro" element damage to nearby opponents while causing said allies to do additional Electro-based damage as an area of effect attack upon hitting foes. Meanwhile, her Elemental Burst skill, "Secret Art - Musou Shinsetsu" allows her to do increased damage and gain defensive properties for a short period of time. The strength of these effects relies on the number of "Resolve" stacks the Raiden Shogun has acquired during combat; Resolve is gained when allies use their own Elemental Burst skills or pick up "Elemental Orb" items, and are spent upon activating Musou Shinsetsu. Outside of regular gameplay, the Raiden Shogun is also available for a card for the in-game "Genius Invokation" trading card game, obtained by inviting her to a card duel and defeating her.

== Promotion and reception ==
In addition to her design's Japanese influences helping set the tone for Inazuma, the symbolism establishes her as an antagonist different from the other "Archon" characters.

Teased in version 2.0 of the game with the introduction of the nation of Inazuma and its related storyline, the Raiden Shogun made her in-game debut in July 2021, and was confirmed as an upcoming playable character the following day in promotional material released by miHoYo. In August, miHoYo published content teasing further Story Quests that would explore her background, along with allowing players to obtain a polearm called "Engulfing Lightning". Merchandise of the character has also been released, including a Nendoroid and a small replica statue.

The character was well-received upon release. In September 2021, during the week of her release, the game generated 150 million US dollars in revenue, far exceeding that of the whole preceding month. Genshin Impact topped the sales ranking for mobile games in 42 countries and regions. A commentator for HK01 attributed this to her character design, widespread advertising, high player expectations, and the discounts of the game's first anniversary. This record exceeded all previous characters until she made available again in March 2022. Internet memes arose suggesting her inability to cook, sparking a large amount of fan art, some of which portrayed her servant Kujou Sara as the "wife" in their relationship trying to ensure she did not starve.

Kotaku's Sisi Jiang heavily discussed her character, feeling that while she was an arrogant character with commanding air, she also had a protective personality underneath and regarded the protagonist "in a motherly or sisterly way." However Jiang voiced disdain for her changed portrayal in the English localization, which they felt tried too hard to portray her as a "girlboss", and further questioned why she seemed to be the only female character with any agency in the game's storyline. They also questioned her strict adherence to logical thinking, feeling it clashed with the characterization they had come to know while playing as her. However, they enjoyed the questions it raised regarding artificial intelligence in the form of Raiden as a puppet, and found Ei's assertion of being the "actual" Raiden fascinating. While the character was the antagonist of the "Transient Dreams" questline, they stated that her "opposition is presented as principled and admirable", helping to redefine the player's understanding of the game's world and gave "one of the most realistic portrayals of grief" they had seen.

Other outlets met the character with more mixed reception. Siliconera's Jenni Lada felt that while earlier attempts at portraying Ei's character were lacking, a recurring theme of many characters in the title she noticed, later quests involving her offered some depth and a form of "redemption" and gave her hope such treatment would be expanded to the rest of the game's cast. Tamara Lazic of Anime Corner stated particular disdain for the "Ei" element of her character, feeling that she was "irresponsible" for creating Shogun as a puppet to shirk her responsibilities as a god. While she acknowledged that the in-game story felt rushed and particularly weak, it did not justify how she acted or was portrayed, and while subsequent quests worked to soften her character, "no amount of fluff content can fix her personality." Lazic further argued it would probably be best to leave the character as is, rather than to try and explore a redemption arc.

Meanwhile, the Raiden Shogun's design was the subject of discussion in several published works. Sasha Wang in an article for The Stanford Daily praised the attention to detail in her design, illustrating both her role as an antagonist with how it contrasts to the other archon characters in the game, and how the symbolism in her attire established her visually as an "absolute leader" according to Japanese clothing customs. The paper "Preliminary study into the Genshin impact's aesthetics" further emphasized the significance of the Japanese aesthetics on her popularity in both the game and community social media correspondence, noting the use of elements representative of her character so players could recognize their significance, and cited her as an example of "spreading of a cultural visual pattern through video games media". Meanwhile, Indonesian bachelor Rafi Zikrul Fakhri Sangadji and Arie Prasetio in their own study of the series suggested that her large breasts and "sensual figure" were designed to play a large part of her appeal, particularly in China where such flew in the face of regulatory standards regarding depictions of sexuality.

In a retrospective, Dengeki Online writer Marizo stated that it was "love at first sight" with the character, describing her as having "beauty and presence that even inspire fear" and further praising Miyuki Sawashiro's strong performance and emotional range in the role. She further appreciated the heavy Japanese themes in the Raiden Shogun's design, stating that the kimono increased her likeability and comparing it to seeing Japanese actors in American Hollywood films. Going into more detail, Marizo felt the outfit with its exposed cleavage was sexy and not vulgar, and even incorporated ninja elements through aspects like the gauntlets. Attention was also paid to the Raiden Shogun's eyes which Marizo found cute, but also the addition of a tear drop beauty mark near it. Noting that beauty marks were common on lightning-themed characters in video games, she found it surprising how this added element boosted the Raiden Shogun's sex appeal dramatically. Praise was also given to her characterization, such as her inability to cook and friendship with fellow character Yae Miko, but also in how she moved and animated during combat, expressing that "motion and effects are cool and beautiful, and just looking at them makes you gasp".
