= Inazuma (Genshin Impact) =

Fictional nation in Genshin Impact

- Genshin Impact location
- Inazuma City, the capital and largest city
- Created by: miHoYo
- Based on: Japan during the Edo period

In-universe information
- Type: Country
- Ruled by: Inazuma Shogunate; Raiden Shogun
- Races: Humans; Youkai
- Location: Southeastern part of Teyvat
- Characters: List
- Element: Electro
- Ideal: Eternity

Inazuma (/ˌiːnəˈzuːmə/ EE-nə-ZOO-mə; Chinese: 稻妻; pinyin: Dàoqī) is a fictional nation in the video game Genshin Impact, developed by miHoYo. The region officially opened to players on July 21, 2021, with the release of the game's version 2.0. Located southeast of the main continent of Teyvat, Inazuma is a multi-island nation based on Edo Japan and its culture. The area's design, gameplay, and storyline have garnered considerable attention and commentary from reviewers. While the landscape and humanistic design have received positive reviews, some criticized Inazuma's puzzles and gameplay for being subpar.

== Creation and design ==
=== Scenes and gameplay ===
miHoYo first disclosed information on Inazuma in July 2021. Inazuma is the third country to be released among Teyvat's seven nations. Similar to Japan in real life, Inazuma is a collection of islands that have their own culture and roots. Inazuma is ruled by the Raiden Shogun, and the terrain and environment are deeply influenced by the element of electricity (Electro). The Japanese word "inazuma" (稲妻) means "lightning" in English. The development team stated in an interview that there are two key points in Inazuma's scene design: the first is to integrate the element of Electro into how players explore the area as well as into the terrain and regional ecosystem; the second is to set a clear theme for each island. Each island was designed to have its own characteristics in terms of plot, setting, and gameplay.

The island setting of Inazuma imposed limitations on the size of the environment, so one of the development team's most important challenges was figuring out how to include enough gameplay within such a limited space. At the same time, the addition of more gameplay elements increased the likelihood of crashes on some devices. To address this, the team spent a significant amount of time on technical iterations and even created custom performance optimization systems for some complex structures, such as the floating design of Tatarasuna. This ensured that after the region launched, it could run smoothly across platforms. In the promotional livestream for Version 2.0, a miHoYo representative mentioned that the Raiden Shogun's pursuit of eternity is the central theme throughout Inazuma. The development team expressed this through the region's history, culture, and geography. For example, the design of each island incorporates elements showcasing the Raiden Shogun's ideals, her divine retainers, and the ideological conflicts between humans and gods.

After learning from past experiences, the design of puzzles no longer forces players to use a specific element to solve them. Even some mechanisms that require the use of Electro can be activated through a newly introduced mechanic called an electrogranum. The development team also designed various new mechanics around the Electro element, such as long-distance traversal. At the same time, the developers integrated the game's lore into the puzzle-solving process to enhance player immersion. The high difficulty of the puzzles in Inazuma was an intentional design choice, as the team believed that challenging puzzles encourage interaction and communication among players. They also made new attempts in designing the quests in Inazuma. Some side quests involving non-player characters intentionally adopted a fragmented narrative style. The World Quest "Sacred Sakura Cleansing Ritual" featured an especially complex quest structure, which caused a number of programming errors during development. The team was still working overtime to fix bugs up until the day before the version update deadline.

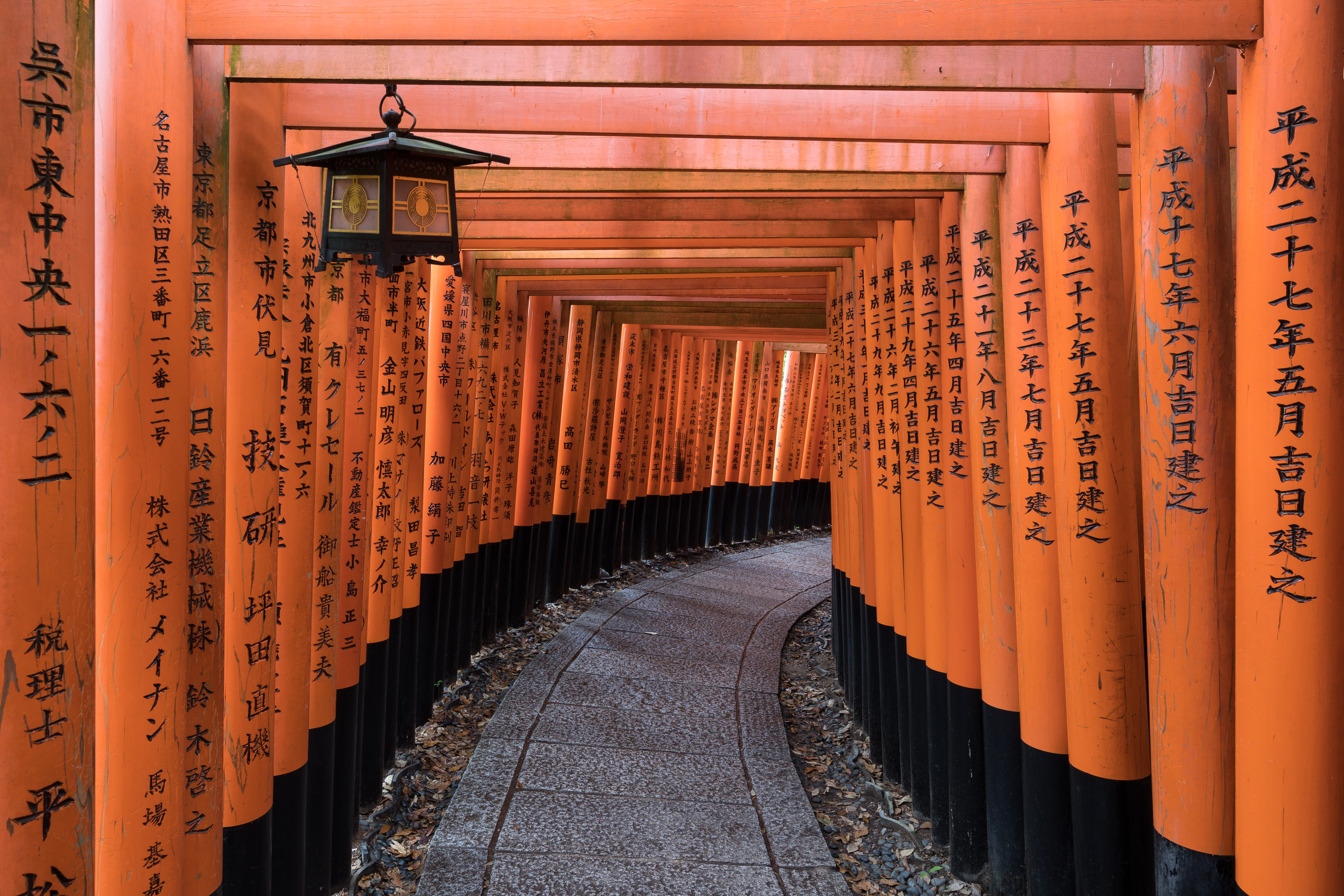
A Shinto shrine in Kyoto

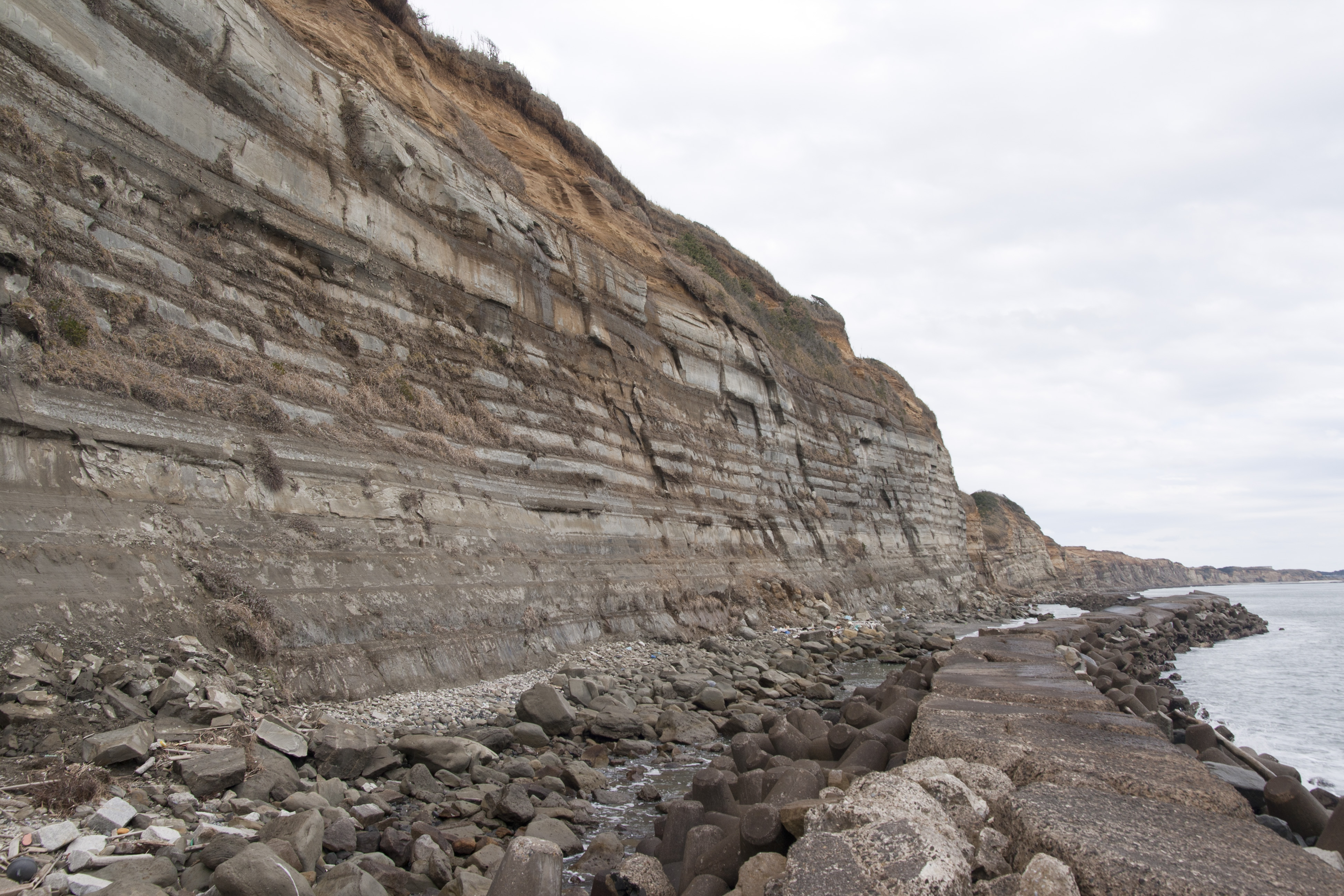
The Byōbugaura sea cliff served as inspiration for the terrain of Inazuma

Inazuma's overall design drew inspiration from Edo Japan. The game included traditional Japanese cultural elements like shoguns, samurai and ninjas. The religious sites in Inazuma are similar to Shinto shrines. The design of the Grand Narukami Shrine was influenced by Fushimi Inari-taisha in Kyoto, and there are a large number of torii gates on the approach to the shrine. The design of the Sacred Sakura inside the shrine is derived in part from the belief in himorogi (Japanese: 神籬, lit. 'divine fence'). In addition, the castle structure of some buildings shares similarities with the design of tenshu. Concepts used in Inazuma can also be found in similar prototypes in real-life Japanese history; examples of this include the Sakoku Decree and the Kanjou Commission, both of which were derived from Japanese isolationism. Some story backgrounds also refer to bake-danuki and other forms of yokai. The lead scene artist shared during the preview livestream that Inazuma's rocky terrain was modeled after the stratified layers of Byōbugaura, with alternating horizontal stripes and interlaced lines to express the influence of the thunder element on the terrain of Inazuma.

The design of the subterranean region of Enkanomiya was inspired by Ancient Greece. During the preview livestream, level designers Xuezige and Yiyi shared that the core theme of Enkanomiya's design is to provoke a sense of "solitary exploration". The development team aimed to evoke player emotions through strong spatial contrasts in this area, while the art design sought to convey a sense of mystery and "the desolation of ancient ruins." Enkanomiya also introduced a new mechanic called the "Day-Night Cycle" which significantly affects its gameplay and quest design. This feature allows players to switch between day and night within Enkanomiya, altering the environment and enabling puzzle-solving depending on the time.

=== Music ===
The music for Inazuma was performed by the Tokyo Philharmonic Orchestra in collaboration with Japanese traditional musical artists. The soundtrack blends traditional Japanese music with orchestral arrangements, written using traditional Japanese modes and incorporating instruments like the koto, shakuhachi, shamisen, and taiko drums.

The music development was led by Sony Music Entertainment Japan, with the game's music composer Yu-Peng Chen serving remotely as the main composer due to the COVID-19 pandemic. Chen said that the music production for Inazuma was very difficult. During the recording stage, frequent adjustments were required, such as fine-tuning measures or even removing an instrument entirely. It also took extensive experimentation to balance the distinct styles of various instruments. Ultimately, recording all of Inazuma's music took about a month and a half, while the entire process, including preparation, lasted nearly four months.

== Setting ==
=== Geography ===
Amakumo Peak, one of the regions of Inazuma, is an example of the significance of lightning in Inazuma.

Inazuma is the only maritime archipelago nation among the seven nations of Teyvat. It is located in the southeastern region of the map and consists of six islands. The local environment is deeply influenced by Electro. Raiden Ei is the goddess who rules over Inazuma. She resides in Inazuma City, and she established the Shogunate to govern the region. Administrative affairs of Inazuma are handled by the Shogunate's subordinate agencies known as the Tri-Commission, which consists of sub-commissions responsible for military, financial, and cultural and religious matters. The southern part of Narukami Island houses the nation's capital, Inazuma City, while the northern mountaintops hold the Grand Narukami Shrine. Within the shrine stands the Sacred Sakura tree, a symbol of the Raiden Shogun's protection over Inazuma. Its roots spread throughout the land, and all Thunder Sakura trees across the region are considered its offshoots. Yashiori Island bears the scars of the battle where the Raiden Shogun slew the serpent Orobashi. The power in that blow was so great that the island was split in two, forming the Musoujin Gorge, and Orobashi's massive skeletal remains are scattered across the island. The remnants of the serpent's divine power were later sealed in Fort Mumei, where the Shogunate constructed Inazuma's largest smelting facility, the Mikage Furnace. The island suffers from torrential rainfall and frequent thunderstorms. Tsurumi Island is a deserted island perpetually shrouded in thick fog, while at the center of Seirai Island lies an unending thunderstorm. Watatsumi Island features a design reminiscent of the Dragon Palace, a structure from Japanese folklore, purportedly located in the Ryukyu Islands, and its inhabitants worship the aforementioned Orobashi instead of the Raiden Shogun. The island is surrounded by cliffs and waterfalls, and on it stands the Sangonomiya Shrine, which contains the entrance to the region of Enkanomiya. Enkanomiya lies deep beneath Inazuma and consists of a series of floating islands. The area contains numerous ruins of an ancient civilization. Due to the absence of sunlight, a unique ecosystem developed there, with vegetation displaying cool color tones.

=== Lore ===
The Raiden Shogun and her twin sister, Raiden Makoto, established the shogunate in Inazuma after winning the Archon War, a conflict which took place across Teyvat. Makoto handled political affairs while Ei, who was skilled in combat, supported her as a body double. Most people were unaware that the two ruled together. During a war several hundred years prior to the game's events, Makoto was killed. Ei inherited the position of Electro Archon from her and continued to use Makoto's divine name "Baal". After experiencing the loss of friends and family, she decided to pursue the concept of eternity. She wanted Inazuma to remain eternally unchanged, so she issued the isolationist Sakoku Decree, prohibiting communication and travel in and out of Inazuma. She also ordered the shogunate to confiscate Visions, magical foci which grant the user the power to control the elements, in an effort to maintain domestic stability via the Vision Hunt Decree. Ei herself withdrew into her inner world, which she called the Plane of Euthymia, to meditate and reduce the "erosion" caused by the passage of time. Routine government affairs were handled by a puppet identical in appearance to her, known as the Raiden Shogun.

Her familiar, Yae Miko, disagreed with her approach. When the game's protagonist, the Traveler, visited Inazuma, Yae Miko used the Traveler's involvement in Inazuman affairs to persuade Ei that her current method of pursuing eternity was ineffective. Though the efforts of the Traveler and Yae Miko, Ei changed her previous beliefs and abolished the Vision Hunt Decree. This is successful in part due to Yae Miko having given the Traveler an omamori, or good luck charm, that helped them convince her. Ei also began reflecting on the way she had governed Inazuma and set about altering the Raiden Shogun's programming. When she had originally designed the puppet Shogun, Ei had anticipated that she might later waver in her convictions, so she created a corrective mechanism to counteract this. To successfully change the puppet's programming, Ei fought the Shogun for five hundred years within an alternate dimension and ultimately defeated her, proving that her new beliefs could withstand challenge and scrutiny. During the battle, she also received the approval of a remnant of Makoto's spirit. Makoto entrusted her with the seed of the Sacred Sakura, the tree which protects Inazuma, and Ei planted the seed in the past. The Sakoku Decree was subsequently lifted.

==== Tsurumi Island and Enkanomiya ====
Both Tsurumi Island and Enkanomiya were once home to civilizations, but both have since disappeared. Thousands of years prior to the game's events, Tsurumi Island was inhabited by a civilization that worshipped the Thunderbird. Its people believed that the Thunderbird protected the island with fog. One day, the singing of a local boy named Ruu attracted the Thunderbird's attention. After speaking with one another, they agreed that Ruu would sing for the Thunderbird again when they next met. Ruu told his father, a priest, about the encounter. However, his father misunderstood the Thunderbird's intentions and performed a ritual in which Ruu was sacrificed. This enraged the Thunderbird, which destroyed the civilization on Tsurumi Island. The souls of the island's inhabitants were trapped there and forced to repeatedly relive the sacrifice. The Thunderbird, driven mad, was later slain by the Raiden Shogun on Seirai Island. Its resentment and regret transformed into a monster known as the Thunder Manifestation. It was not until the Traveler arrived on Tsurumi Island (which is be done in a World Quest and is not part of the main storyline), broke the cycle, and obtained the Thunderbird's forgiveness that the souls of the islanders were finally released.

Enkanomiya was originally located on the surface of Teyvat, but it fell into the Abyss during a catastrophe thousands of years before the game takes place. Under the leadership of the serpent god Orobashi, its people established a civilization known as Byakuyakoku. They also constructed an artificial sun called the Dainichi Mikoshi, which was to illuminate all of Enkanomiya. Orobashi later accidentally discovered a secret concerning the Heavenly Principles, the divine authority that rules Teyvat. To protect his people from being destroyed by the Heavenly Principles, he ordered Byakuyakoku to fully adopt Inazuman culture and created Watatsumi Island on the surface of the sea, where the people of Byakuyakoku could settle. Finally, Orobashi sacrificed his own life to dispel the Heavenly Principles' suspicions, and his people were eventually integrated into Inazuma.

== Release ==
The Inazuma region was released on July 21, 2021, in version 2.0 of the game. The first areas to be released were Narukami Island, Kannazuka, and Yashiori Island. In the game, players can reach Inazuma through the storyline once they have reached the required Adventure Rank and completed the prerequisite Archon Quests. If players attempt to reach Inazuma by other means, they will be struck by lightning when approaching its surrounding waters. After arriving in Inazuma and activating the local Statues of the Seven, the Traveler gains the ability to wield Electro.

Version 2.1 was released in September the same year, adding Seirai Island and Watatsumi Island. Version 2.2 added Tsurumi Island. Enkanomiya was introduced in version 2.4 in January 2022. To access this area, players must complete the World Quests "The Moon-Bathed Deep" and "The Still Water's Flow".

== Reception ==
Critics have given positive evaluations of Inazuma's cultural and environmental design. Outlets such as Kotaku and 3DM all noted that its design shows improvement compared to the game's earlier regions, Mondstadt and Liyue. New York Times commentator Ben Dooley pointed out that after the game's release, there had been controversy about its alleged imitation of The Legend of Zelda: Breath of the Wild; miHoYo used Inazuma to dispel these rumors and to reassure Japanese players. The region received praise for its use of Japanese aesthetics and elements. Kotaku editor Sisi Jiang mentioned that Inazuma received a certain amount of support from Japan's soft power. Austin Wood, editor of GamesRadar+, said that Inazuma is an important milestone in Genshin Impact, which has shed the shadow of Breath of the Wild and created a unique style. Commentator Lian Po wrote in 3DM that Inazuma is a "qualitative leap" compared to the early scene design of the game. The large number of cave scenes in the Inazuma area not only conforms to the humanistic setting of the area, but also provides a rich gameplay. The editor of GameLook believes that Inazuma has created a unique style in terms of "history, humanities and geography" and praised the experience of exploring the area. Editor Kento Iwase of GAME Watch was reminded of Japanese-style architecture in Kyoto and other places, which are naturally familiar to Japanese people, and the scenery will also change with time.

"Electro Cube" devices like this one are an example of the puzzles found in Inazuma. The symbols on each cube light up and change when attacked by a player, and some puzzles have the cubes rotate. The rotation and lighting changes can affect adjacent cubes or a specific set of cubes, so attacking different cubes is required to solve the puzzle and obtain rewards. When the puzzle is solved, the cubes will stay lit.

The puzzles and gameplay design of the Inazuma region have attracted the attention of many commentators. One editor on Chinese site Youxi Putao said the puzzle-solving gameplay has become completely independent since Inazuma, and the puzzle-solving process has become more complicated. They said, "it is more closely integrated with the theme and design of the entire map". Another editor pointed out that the puzzle content of Inazuma is richer than that of the early game, diversifying players' puzzle-solving experiences. Sisi Jiang criticized the difficulty of the puzzles in the Inazuma region as higher than those in earlier regions, and the time invested in the puzzles is not proportional to the rewards obtained for solving them.

Some commentators have pointed out other design highlights of Inazuma. Brian Ashcraft of Kotaku says that the modification of the details of the swords used by Inazuma characters demonstrates miHoYo's respect for Japanese culture, a move that was well received by Japanese players. Lian Po believes that the art and music of Inazuma is consistent and reflects the "tension caused by Inazuma's isolation". Sisi Jiang praised the plot design of the sidequests in Inazuma, such as the Sacred Sakura Cleansing Ritual, for effectively introducing Inazuma's early history, and described the Tsurumi Island questline as tightly interwoven and meticulously designed, saying these side quests surpassed the quality of the main storyline. Jiang also gave high praise to Enkanomiya, calling its music the most stunning of any area introduced since Inazuma's release and noting that the lore surrounding Orobashi completely changed his perception of the character. Bruno Yonezawa of Screen Rant described Inazuma as the game's most underrated region.
