= Genius Invokation TCG =

2022 collectible card video game

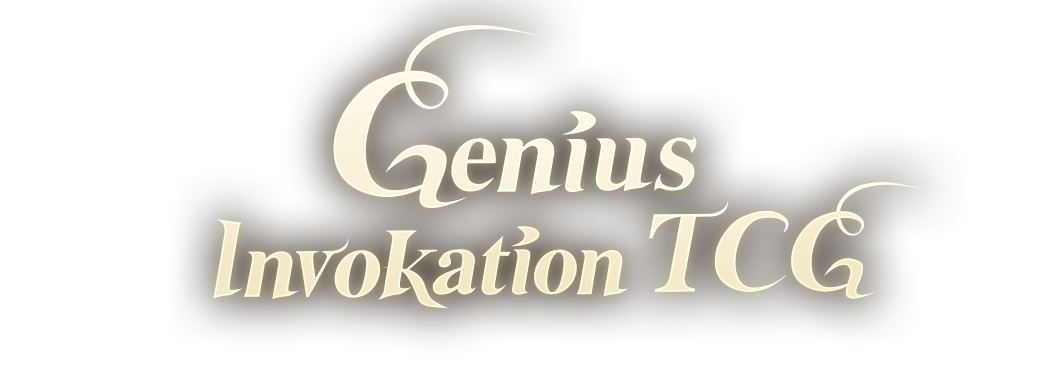
- Official logo
- Developer: miHoYo
- Publisher: HoYoverse (global): miHoYo (China)
- Release: December 7, 2022
- Genre: Collectible card game
- Modes: Single-player, multiplayer

Genius Invokation TCG (Chinese: 七圣召唤; pinyin: Qīshèng Zhàohuàn; lit. 'Summoning of the Seven Sages'), often abbreviated as GITCG, is a free-to-play digital collectible card game developed by miHoYo as a permanent game mode within Genshin Impact that was released alongside the game's Version 3.3 update on December 7, 2022. The game features characters, events and location within Genshin Impact's fantasy world of Teyvat.

== Gameplay ==
In a game of Genius Invokation TCG, each player starts with a deck made up of 3 character cards and 30 action cards.

A game of Genius Invokation TCG in progress

A typical match begins with each player drawing 5 action cards from their draw pile (after which they may choose to mulligan any number of cards once), before selecting one of their character cards as the active character. Each round starts with players rolling 8 eight-sided "elemental dice" (each side of which corresponds to one of the seven elements introduced in the main game, as well as an Omni element that can substitute for any element), which are used as a form of currency for actions within the round. Players may opt to re-roll any number of dice once (or more times, under certain conditions). Within each round, players may take "combat actions" (such as using skills, attacking the opponent and swapping to another character), which passes the turn to the opponent afterwards, and "fast actions" (such as using action cards and spending action cards to tune dice), which keeps the turn on the player that completed the action. Players may end their actions on a round at any time; if they were the first to do so, their opponent gets to continue taking actions before they also end the round, but the player ending first gains priority on summon triggers and effect triggers on the end phase, and gets to start first on the following round. At the end of each round, each player draws two cards from their draw pile. The game ends when all 3 characters of a player are knocked out, or when 14 rounds have completed (the latter of which is displayed as a double loss).

The core gameplay mechanics of Genshin Impact have been adapted to Genius Invokation TCG, with characters' skills based on their combat abilities within the main game, as well as a simplified elemental reaction system and energy system.

=== PvE gameplay ===
Players can acquire action cards, as well as "Lucky Coins" (the mode's currency) by completing challenges in the main game's open world. Character cards can be unlocked via challenges that are accessible within the Cat's Tail tavern located in Mondstadt, where players can also play weekly NPC challenges and The Forge Realm's Temper to earn Lucky Coins, as well as purchase cards and cosmetics.

=== Multiplayer ===
Genius Invokation TCG features two online queue modes: Co-op Matching, where no restrictions apply, and Arena of Champions, where players complete runs by winning 5 games with the same deck before accumulating 3 losses. Both queue modes require Player Level 4 to be unlocked.

A player can also invite any other player inside their own co-op session to a match. Unlike in-game matchmaking, there are no restrictions to playing against others this way.

Sometimes, a third queue mode named Heated Battle Mode will be open for a limited time, featuring a modified ruleset. Just as with the regular ruleset, players can either enter a special matchmaking queue for the mode, or they can invite another player to compete against with the ruleset enabled within the time the mode is available.

=== Physical version ===
The back of a physical card.

An official physical version of Genius Invokation TCG was released in China on November 8, 2024, published by ShiningSoul, including an accessory kit, 8 preconstructed decks, and booster boxes. 18 character cards and 91 action cards are available. Game Rant commented that HoYoverse only launched the physical card set in China and speculated that this may be the company testing its popularity for a future international release.

== In-game story ==
Within the world of Teyvat, Genius Invokation TCG was first mentioned by the merchant Liben in the Version 2.3 in-game event Marvelous Merchandise, in which he revealed he was delivering the game (then referred to as "Sacred Call of Seven") to the Yae Publishing House per a commission from an unnamed researcher from Sumeru. Fukumoto, a writer from Inazuma, was then tasked with writing the King of Invokations light novel series to promote the game, subsequently spreading it to other places in Teyvat.

It was later revealed in the Version 3.7 event Duel! The Summoners' Summit! that the card game was originally created by childhood friends and Akademiya researchers Garvipidam and Gulab to pass the time while Gulab was in the hospital for disease. Gulab eventually died from the disease, leading to Garvipidam being traumatized and secluding himself until he came to terms with his friend's passing.

== Development ==
Genius Invokation TCG was first announced in the announcement live stream for the Version 3.1 update of Genshin Impact on September 16, 2022, in which Michael, Genshin Impact's Head of Marketing for Mainland China at the time, stated that the mode was primarily designed to be a "light and casual" PvE experience, with no rewards for multiplayer matches. The developers have also stated that they would balance existing cards along the mode's lifespan. It was released alongside version 3.3 of the game.

== Reception ==
In mid-November 2022, shortly before the release of Genius Invokation TCG, some players had already recreated the mode as a Tabletop Simulator mod, based on officially released information. Around the time the mode was launched, it attracted the attention of many Chinese TCG enthusiasts. Youxiputao editor Dai Homer reported that player activity significantly increased shortly after the release of the mode, with miHoYo's cloud gaming service Genshin Impact · Cloud in China experiencing longer player queues. The mode also gained popularity outside of China, trending on X in Japan upon release and prompting an unofficial Swiss format tournament series from the English-speaking community shortly after.

The launch of Genius Invokation TCG received positive comments from critics, with many comparing them to other titles such as Hearthstone and Gwent. Editor Guo Su wrote on Youxiputao that Genius Invokation TCG would enrich the fan-created content scene of Genshin Impact, noting that Genius Invokation TCG has more randomness than other game modes, making it more engaging for live streaming and interaction with viewers. Dai Homer also pointed out that the mode's popularity helps more players understand the world of Teyvat itself, thanks to its references to the main game. Xunyang, an editor at GameRes, praised the launch of the mode as being well-handled, saying that the game had already laid the groundwork in early versions, "with sufficient foreshadowing". In May 2023, miHoYo announced an esports tournament called "Astra Carnival: The Prince Cup" focused on competitive gameplay within the main game, featuring international and regional tournaments.

Opinions on gameplay are mixed. Siliconera writer Stephanie Liu praised the balanced design and simplicity of the game, stating that the game "should remain fair" given that all players are given the same cards to work around. Kotaku editor Sisi Jiang also said that the game made them addicted to it and looked forward to miHoYo releasing more cards in the future. DoNews commentator Yu Cheng Judai criticized the game for its lack of balance, lack of mechanisms and cards to counter elemental reactions, and the tendency to produce fixed and powerful decks, which lacked diversity.

Critics also pointed out that Genius Invokation TCG can help improve the long-term experience of Genshin Impact. Stephanie Liu said that Genius Invokation TCG rekindled her excitement from the early days of the game. Gamersky editor Youming Xingkong said that the Genius Invokation TCG is an attempt to keep players engaged with Genshin Impact and solve the burnout that will occur in long-term operation games. Youxiputao's Hui Xinge also pointed out that Genius Invokation TCG can "make up for the shortcomings of the game's long-term experience" and "strengthen the relationship between players".
