= Yae Miko =

Fictional character in a video game

- Genshin Impact character
- Yae Miko in Genshin Impact
- First game: Genshin Impact (2021)
- Voiced by: EN: Ratana; ZH: Du Mingya; JA: Ayane Sakura; KO: Moon Yoo-jeong

In-universe information
- Species: Kitsune
- Weapon: Catalyst
- Origin: Inazuma
- Element: Electro

Yae Miko (Chinese: 八重神子; pinyin: Bāchóng Shénzǐ) is a character from Genshin Impact, a 2020 action role-playing gacha game developed by miHoYo. She debuted in version 2.0 of the game in 2021 as a non-playable character and became playable in 2022. She is the chief priestess, or Guuji, of the Grand Narukami Shrine in the fictional nation of Inazuma and is a familiar of the nation's ruler, the Raiden Shogun. She is also the co-founder and editor-in-chief of the local publishing house.

Yae Miko's character is modeled after a Shinto shrine maiden, or miko, and her design draws inspiration from the Japanese kami, Inari Ōkami. Her appearance is similar to that of Yae Sakura, a character from Honkai Impact 3rd, another one of miHoYo's games. As an important character in the Inazuma arc of Genshin Impact's story, Yae Miko has attracted considerable attention and commentary from both players and media. Her character portrayal has generally received positive evaluations, while her combat performance has been regarded as average.

== Design and voice acting ==
On February 10, miHoYo released a character teaser that fully revealed Yae Miko's in-game identity as the Guuji of the Grand Narukami Shrine. The trailer showcased a side of her personality that differs from her aloof and reserved portrayal in the game's main storyline, while also emphasizing the deep respect she commands among the people of Inazuma. On the same day, miHoYo launched a web-based mini-game entitled "Fox's Daydream: Strolls Around the World" which featured Yae Miko as the protagonist. In the mini-game, players take on the role of Yae Miko as she visits various shops around Inazuma, and completing the game rewards players with character-themed desktop wallpapers. On February 15, miHoYo released another video which showed that Yae Miko was also the editor-in-chief of the Yae Publishing House. On March 11, they released a set of stickers featuring characters such as Yae Miko and the Raiden Shogun on HoYoLAB, miHoYo's player community platform. In the game's lore, Yae Miko holds the prestigious dual status of Guuji of the Grand Narukami Shrine and familiar of the Electro Archon. At the same time, as editor-in-chief of a publishing house, she is enthusiastic about founding and organizing festivals. She is portrayed as highly intelligent; this is reflected in her gameplay in that when crafting materials, she has a chance to produce additional random talent materials from the same region as the ones being used to craft.

Her character design draws heavily on Japanese culture. The name "Miko" (神子) is derived from the Japanese term for "shrine maiden", and her outfit resembles traditional Shinto shrine maiden attire. The Grand Narukami Shrine where she resides is modeled after Fushimi Inari-taisha in Kyoto, being situated atop a mountain and accessed by a path lined with torii gates. She is depicted in-game as a descendant of the kitsune and is fond of fried tofu, mirroring the preferences associated with the Inari deity in Japanese folklore. She is also a fan of light novels. Her signature weapon, "Kagura's Verity", is visually inspired by the bells used in Kagura dances.

Yae Miko is voiced in Chinese by Du Mingya, who is also the voice of the character Ningguang. Du said that Yae Miko likes to read light novels and also appreciates the sorrows and joys faced by humans. As the Raiden Shogun's familiar, she also undertakes many important responsibilities in Inazuma and is very capable, but also has a dignified side. Her Japanese voice actress is Ayane Sakura. When voicing the character, Sakura was asked to convey a sense of seduction and playful teasing, while also expressing the character's feminine charm and air of mystery. She personally considers Yae Miko to be a highly captivating character due to her perceived omniscience and alluring tone of voice, and remarked that if such a person existed in real life, Sakura would be scared of her. Yae Miko's English voice actress is Ratana. Her audition for the role was overseen by Anne Yatco, the English voice actress for the Raiden Shogun. She is voiced in Korean by Moon Yoo-jeong.

== Appearances ==
=== Lore ===
Yae Miko is the Guuji of the Grand Narukami Shrine in Inazuma and editor-in-chief of the Yae Publishing House. She became a familiar of the Electro Archon during the reign of Raiden Makoto, the predecessor to the Raiden Shogun. After the death of Raiden Makoto, Yae Miko became the only close confidante of the current Electro Archon.

Yae Miko does not fully agree with the Raiden Shogun's pursuit of "eternity" and believes that her prolonged presence in the Plane of Euthymia (the Raiden Shogun's internal plane of consciousness) represents an act of avoidance that ignores changes in Teyvat. After the Traveler arrives in Inazuma, Yae Miko discovers that the Traveler is able to enter the Plane of Euthymia, which signifies that the Raiden Shogun perceives them as a threat to her ideal eternity. Yae Miko then trains the Traveler to gain the ability to oppose the Raiden Shogun, hoping that confrontation through force would help the Raiden Shogun realize that her current approach to the pursuit of eternity is flawed. This is successful in part due to Yae Miko having given the Traveler an omamori, or good luck charm, that helped them convince her.

=== Gameplay ===
Following version 2.5, players could obtain Yae Miko through the game's gacha wish system. She is a five-star Electro character who wields a catalyst in combat. Her normal attacks summon kitsune spirits to deal ranged damage at certain time intervals. Her Elemental Skill places an object called a Sesshou Sakura on the field, with a maximum of three on the field at the same time. Sesshou Sakura will actively use lightning to attack enemies. Her Elemental Burst is an area of effect attack in which when there is a Sesshou Sakura on the field, each one is transformed into a lightning strike. Both her Elemental Skill and Burst have been cited for their high damage output.

== Promotion ==
During the promotional livestream for version 1.5 of the game on April 16, 2021, Yae Miko appeared as a guest character and introduced the Inazuma region for the first time. The program also revealed that she is the "guuji" (head shrine maiden) of a shrine and that she was acquainted with other important characters in the storyline such as Zhongli, Ganyu and the Raiden Shogun. Yae Miko first appeared in the game as a non-playable character in version 2.0, where she served as one of the key characters in the game's Inazuma arc. On December 31, 2021, miHoYo released Yae Miko's official character illustration on their social media. In early February 2022, miHoYo revealed that she would become a playable character in version 2.5, alongside a dedicated story quest focusing on her. Access to the story quest would require players to have completed act 2 of the Raiden Shogun's story quest as a prerequisite. At the same time, her signature weapon "Kagura's Verity" was also released.

== Reception ==
Yae Miko has generally received positive reviews. As she appeared in the main storyline, many players were drawn to her character design and personality. Several of them drew fan art or engaged in other creative works to celebrate her release; one fan even got the game's official social media accounts to like their post of it. Austin Wood, an editor at GamesRadar+, described Yae Miko's character teaser as the most expressive and visually striking trailer released for Genshin Impact to date, praising miHoYo's animators for crafting vivid character expressions. The use of the omamori in the storyline was also seen as a strong representation of Japanese culture within the game by scholars of the University of Indonesia's Japanese Studies Program.

Yae Sakura

Evanescia

Yae Miko was also compared to Evanescia from Honkai: Star Rail, also another game developed by miHoYo, in terms of appearance because of her pink hair and long ears. There is a popular theory among fans that the "lesbian coding" of Yae Miko is related to Yae Sakura as well, because the latter is a canon lesbian character. Rain Kengly of Screen Rant believes that Yae Miko, as a descendant of the kitsune, is a highly intelligent person who frequently uses her wit and cleverness to achieve her goals. As the Raiden Shogun's familiar, she is portrayed as a powerful and cunning ally for the game's protagonist, the Traveler. Game Rant editor Brittni Finley commented that Yae Miko is both mysterious and awe-inspiring, and that she plays an important role in the Inazuma arc of the game's storyline due to her relationship with the Raiden Shogun. Another critic, Nahda Nabiilah, said that Yae Miko is one of the most interesting characters in Genshin Impact to date, and that her beautiful design and personality make her a character that many players look forward to acquiring. One analysis referred to her as being an "implied lesbian" for her relationship with the Raiden Shogun, citing in particular the in-game content regarding it and its significance to the story.

=== Elemental Skill controversy ===
Her Elemental Skill, called Sesshou Sakura, was originally designed to attack nearby enemies at random. In version 2.6, miHoYo altered the skill's behavior so it would prioritize attacking the nearest enemy instead. Initially, according to Automaton's Ken Furumi, some users initially believed the change to be a buff to her combat abilities. The change sparked dissatisfaction among players, who argued that the adjustment made Yae Miko weaker in combat, particularly because her constellation system expands the attack range of Sesshou Sakura, and the revision rendered that ineffective. Pulling more than one copy of a character would allow players to activate one of that character's "constellations" which can have various impacts on how that character performs in combat. Furumi speculated that the reasoning why the player community had such a negative reaction to the change was due to "the way the management presented information and their attitude". He explained that miHoYo initially said the change was a bug fix, but noted that the bug's existence was not actually communicated to players until a month after its implementation. He believes that the use of the word "bug" caused some users to be suspicious that miHoYo's explanation was rhetoric "designed to avoid making the change to paid gacha characters a problem". Shortly after releasing the change, miHoYo announced that the change would be reverted and compensation would be given to players.
