= Venti (Genshin Impact) =

Fictional character in a video game

- Genshin Impact character
- Official artwork
- First appearance: Genshin Impact prologue: "Songs of the Wind" (2018)
- First game: Genshin Impact (2020)
- Voiced by: EN: Erika Harlacher; ZH: Miao Jiang; JA: Ayumu Murase; KO: Jung Yoo-jung

In-universe information
- Aliases: Barbatos, "Tone-Deaf Bard", Anemo Archon
- Weapon: Bow
- Origin: Mondstadt
- Element: Anemo

Venti (Chinese: 温迪; pinyin: Wēndí) is a fictional character from Genshin Impact, a 2020 action role-playing gacha game developed by miHoYo. He was first introduced to Genshin Impact in a September 2020 update. Within the game's story, he serves as one of the seven Archons and oversees the Mondstadt region. He is the first major character encountered by the Traveler after they meet Paimon during the Prologue chapter. He is voiced by Miao Jiang in Chinese, Erika Harlacher in English, Ayumu Murase in Japanese, and Jung Yoo-jung in Korean.

== Design and voice acting ==
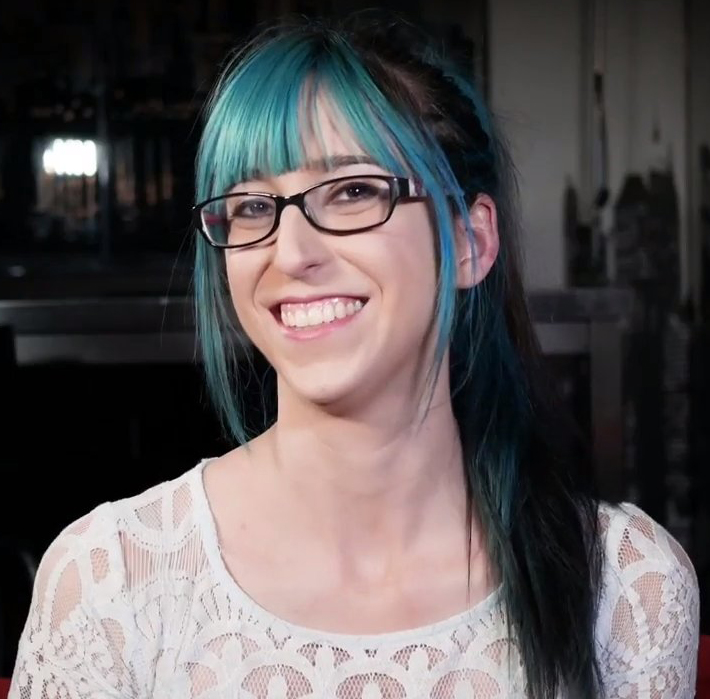
Venti is voiced in English by Erika Harlacher.

In-game, Venti appears as a mysterious bard in Mondstadt. Players first encounter him there, overhearing his conversation with the dragon Dvalin. His identity as the Archon Barbatos is gradually revealed in the subsequent quest chain, culminating in a joint effort with Diluc and Jean to save the dragon known as "Stormterror" Dvalin.

Venti's design blends youthful and androgynous features. His outfit includes a green cape, corset, and curved shorts, creating a silhouette with visual softness. Venti's accessories, such as a ribboned hat and the Cecilia flower (visually similar to a lily, a symbol of purity and divinity), reinforce the femininity of his aesthetic. His color scheme is primarily green and blue, which corresponds with his Anemo (wind) element and is more commonly coded as masculine in Western culture. His design draws inspiration from Barbatos in demonology. The character's animations and body posture convey assertiveness, but often includes curved leg positions and flowing garments that evoke softness. His cheerful, light-hearted facial expressions and fluid, airborne movement style add to the perception of delicacy and ambiguity in gender presentation. Venti has an estimated physical age of 15 to 16 years, though his true age is over 2,600 years and his form is that of a young boy. Players have noted visual similarities in Venti's design to Wendy, a character who also has control over wind from another game by miHoYo, Honkai Impact 3rd. He is voiced by Erika Harlacher in English, Miao Jiang in Chinese, Ayumu Murase in Japanese, and Jung Yoo-jung in Korean.

== Appearances ==
=== Story ===
Venti appears in Genshin Impact as a bard who is fond of drinking who travels Mondstadt and occasionally intervenes during major events. He is the mortal guise of Barbatos, the Anemo Archon. Over 2,600 years ago, Mondstadt was ruled by two gods: Decarabian, who confined his people within storm walls, and Andrius, a wolf. A rebellion led by an unnamed youth and a wind spirit ended Decarabian's reign. After the youth's death, the spirit became Barbatos. While Andrius chose to become one of the Four Winds, Barbatos later withdrew from power to avoid repeating past tyranny, allowing Mondstadt to govern itself. Later, when the Lawrence Clan rose to power and imposed slavery, Vennessa—helped by divine intervention—overthrew them and founded the Knights of Favonius. Venti continues to roam the city as a bard. He later joins all of Teyvat in protecting the world against the Nails of Retribution. (Note: The Nails of Retribution are giant nails hanging in the sky, created by Celestia, to combat deviations from a divine plan made by the Heavenly Principles, Teyvat's ruler.)

A character trailer titled Venti: The Four Winds was released during a promotional banner period, depicting how other figures in Mondstadt, including the Lionfang Knight and Stormterror, respond to Venti's presence. An earlier trailer had introduced his in-game abilities. The promotional banner featured Venti as a limited-time character alongside Barbara, Fischl, and Xiangling, and remained available until October 18, 2020. In the Version 1.4 update of Genshin Impact, released on March 17, 2021, the five-star character Venti, referred to as the "Windborne Bard", appeared again in the event wish "Ballad in Goblets". During the event, the appearance rate of Venti and several four-star characters was significantly increased. Venti is described as one of the many free-spirited bards in Mondstadt.

=== Gameplay ===
As a playable character, Venti uses a bow in combat. He uses Anemo abilities to group enemies and enable elemental reactions. His Elemental Skill, "Skyward Sonnet", launches enemies into the air and creates an upward current when held. His Elemental Burst, "Wind's Grand Ode", summons a Stormeye that pulls in enemies and deals continuous Anemo damage, absorbing another element if contact occurs. In Version 6.2, which was also referred to as "Luna III", Venti was given a set of buffs referred to as "Hexerei: Secret Rite" alongside other older characters from the Mondstadt region. After completing the "Witch's Homework" tasks that corresponded to Venti, he would be designated as a Hexerei character. If 2 or more Hexerei characters are in a party, certain additional combat effects could occur - in Venti's case, when the Stormeye from his Elemental Burst is active, his Normal Attacks are turned into "Windsunder Arrows" which deal Anemo damage and could pierce enemies, as well as extend the duration of the Stormeye. In Version 6.2, Venti was also given a new signature weapon, "The Daybreak Chronicles", which was created for a more main DPS-oriented playstyle.

== Promotion and reception ==
Venti first appeared in the 2018 Genshin Impact prequel manhua, later becoming playable in Version 1.0. His signature weapon "Elegy for the End" was added in Version 1.4.

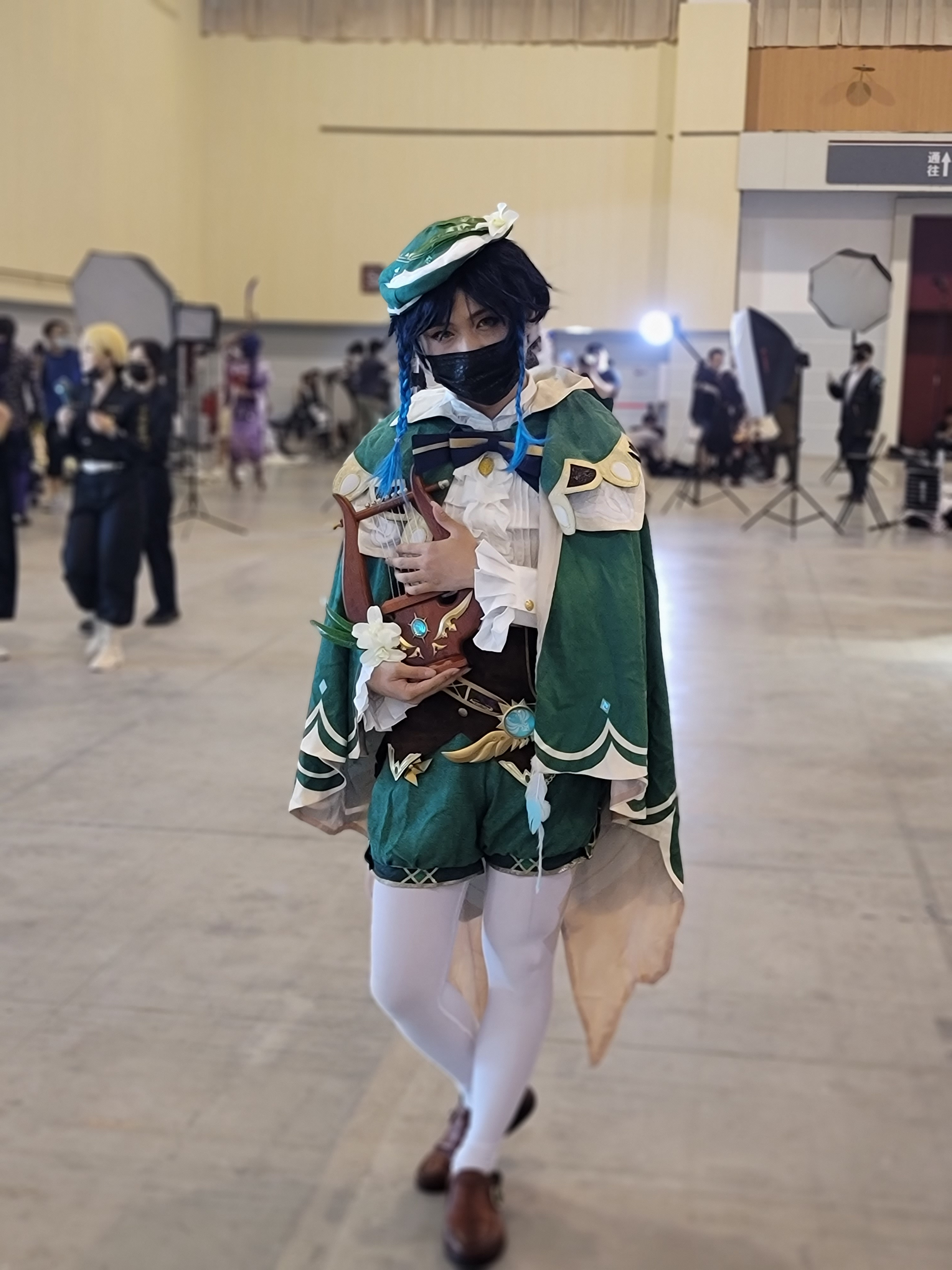
A cosplayer as Venti in 2022

Following the Genshin Impact pre-release livestream, many players began preparing to obtain Venti through the game's gacha system. Cosplayers also embraced the character, demonstrating Venti's popularity. Screen Rant's Austin King highlighted Venti's dual significance as both the game's first five-star character and his pivotal role in Mondstadt's main storyline, cementing his status among Genshin Impact's most beloved characters. Game Rant contributor Jeffrey Yu emphasized Venti's enduring viability despite being the first limited 5-star character, praising his crowd control and exploration utility. PCGamesN contributor Ethan Anderson wrote in 2022 that Venti was one of the best Anemo characters in the entire game. Anderson also said that Venti's rerun banner earned HoYoverse US$5,200,000 and another separate banner featuring him in 2022 earning a further US$4,200,000. Several players who were not able to get Venti felt anguished over their missed opportunity, and this was furthered by people who did so successfully boasting about it on social media. Merchandise of the character has also been released, including a nendoroid plastic figure released by Good Smile Company on April 20, 2022, with pre-orders opening on March 4. Some players posted a YouTube video in which Venti wears sunglasses and dances enthusiastically to music, with onscreen messages sarcastically touting the worldwide success of Genshin Impact. Ayuo Kawase of AUTOMATON wrote that this dance, originally taken from a meme from Persona 4, represents the game's gacha system.

Kotaku's Sisi Jiang criticized Venti's character as it was in the English dub of Genshin Impact when compared to the Chinese dub, with the latter depicting Venti as more friendly and the former making him more aggressive. Jiang wrote Venti's behavior in the English dub made her want to "throw him into a lake." She viewed this to be an example of what she believed was miHoYo making "soft" male characters more aggressive in the English dub, changes she believed were being made due to the "macho masculinity" consistently demonstrated in the United States, particularly through Hollywood, even if the changes damaged the relationships between characters.

The character is presented as male within the game Genshin Impact. However, among some audiences, his appearance has prompted discussions regarding his gender. One study in Indonesia claimed that "in terms of appearance [Venti] looks like a woman, but in fact [he] is actually a man." Venti has been widely discussed by players and media for his androgynous design, which some interpret as a deliberate subversion of gender expectations. His appearance and personality align with a recognizable archetype in anime and games influenced by Japanese media: the androgynous, youthful, often extroverted male character who may also serve as comic relief. A study by the Bandung Institute of Technology in Indonesia found that Venti's visual design and narrative strengthened players' emotional engagement in the game. Nathan Grayson, writing for Kotaku, described him as a fun and carefree character and highlighted his opportunistic attitude compared to other characters. The character's presentation as an "effeminate looking male" was received negatively in China, however. The country's regulators deemed such characters to be inappropriate content for video games, and guidelines issued to game developers used Venti as a prime example of character types that are confusing if viewers do not read the character descriptions. Commentators on Turkish news channel Ülke TV criticized the character on a segment dedicated to children's exposure to video games. Austin Wood, writing for GamesRadar+, said that the commentators appeared "physically rattled" by Venti's appearance, and suggested that the commentators were questioning the game's gender politics. Upon seeing this, the English-speaking fan community defended Venti, with one commenter comparing the incident to a conspiracy theory that likened Teletubbies to devil worshipers.
