= Mondstadt =

Fictional nation in Genshin Impact

- Genshin Impact location
- Mondstadt City, the nation's eponymous capital and largest city
- Created by: miHoYo
- Based on: Germany; Switzerland

In-universe information
- Type: Country
- Ruled by: Knights of Favonius
- Location: Northeast of Teyvat
- Characters: List
- Element: Anemo
- Ideal: Freedom
- Archon: Barbatos

Mondstadt (/ˈmɒndstæt/ MOND-stat; Chinese: 蒙德; pinyin: Méngdé) is a fictional nation in the video game Genshin Impact, developed by miHoYo. It and Liyue were the first regions of Genshin Impact, having been released in version 1.0 of the game on September 28, 2020. Mondstadt was additionally expanded in version 6.5 (titled "Luna VI") of the game on April 8, 2026. It is located in the northeast of the continent of Teyvat and is the first country visited by the game's protagonist, the Traveler. Mondstadt's cultural inspirations have been debated, but is largely speculated to be modeled after Germany and other areas of Europe. It has generally received praise for its fantasy setting.

== Creation ==
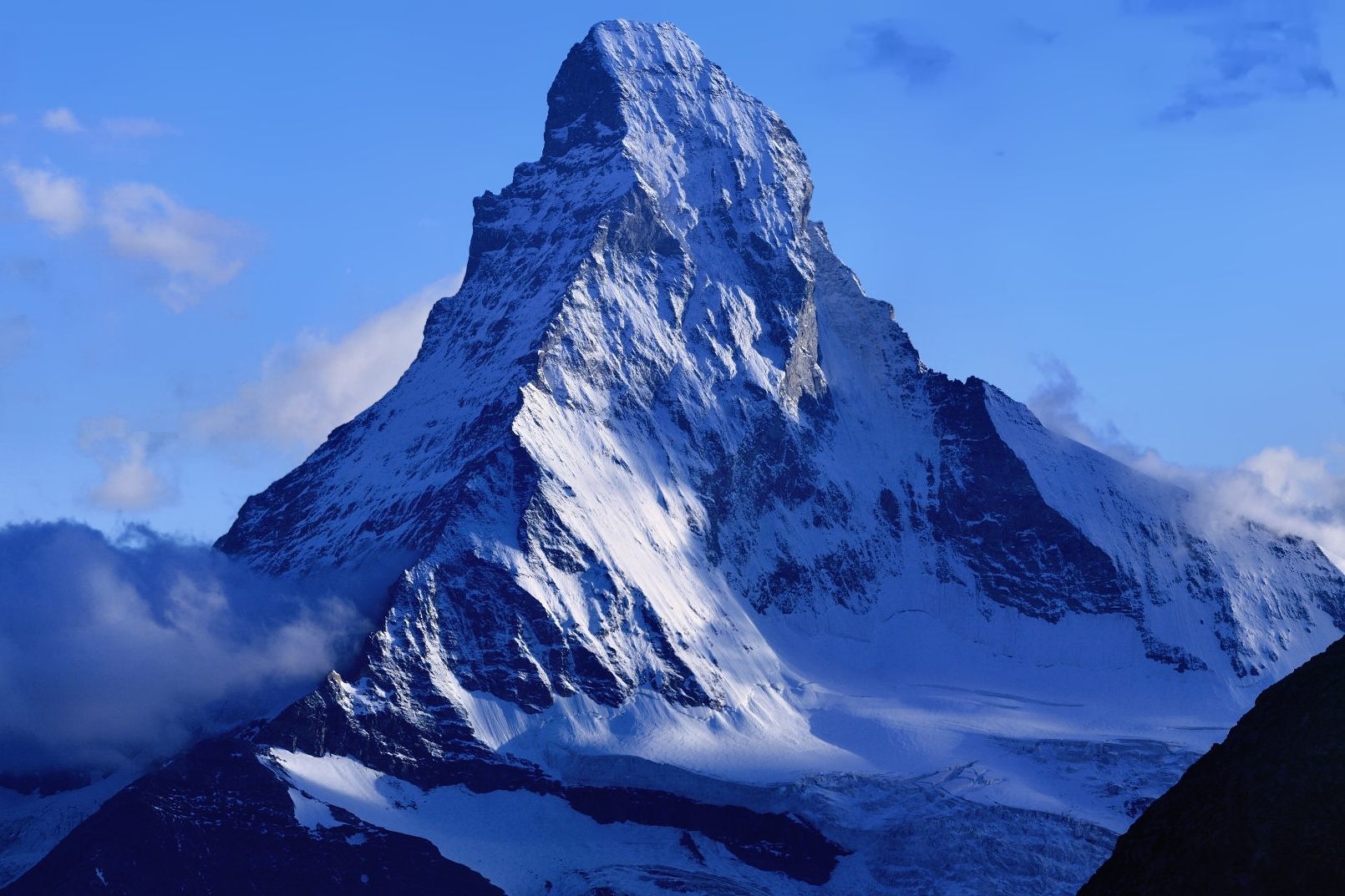
The Matterhorn in the Alps served as the model for Dragonspine in Genshin Impact.

The inspiration behind Mondstadt is unconfirmed and has been cause for speculation. Terry Bass of The AXO pointed out that Mondstadt's design draws on German and Swiss cultural influences, in particular the city of Bern. He suggested that Mondstadt's cathedral was modeled after Regensburg Cathedral in Germany. Jessica Orr of Eurogamer wrote in passing that Mondstadt was also based on the Netherlands, while Sid Natividad of TheGamer and Samantha Low of Tokyo Weekender also wrote that it was based on Germany.

In a behind-the-scenes video, the production team revealed that the snowy, mountainous region of Dragonspine, which is in the south of Mondstadt, was inspired by the Matterhorn in the Alps. They noted that the overall saturation of the snow-covered region is lowered, creating a cooler light source. The story of Dragonspine is presented from the perspectives of an ancient kingdom, modern non-player characters, and the player. The team also shared that the creation of Dragonspine's snow was inspired by the gradient seen in clouds.

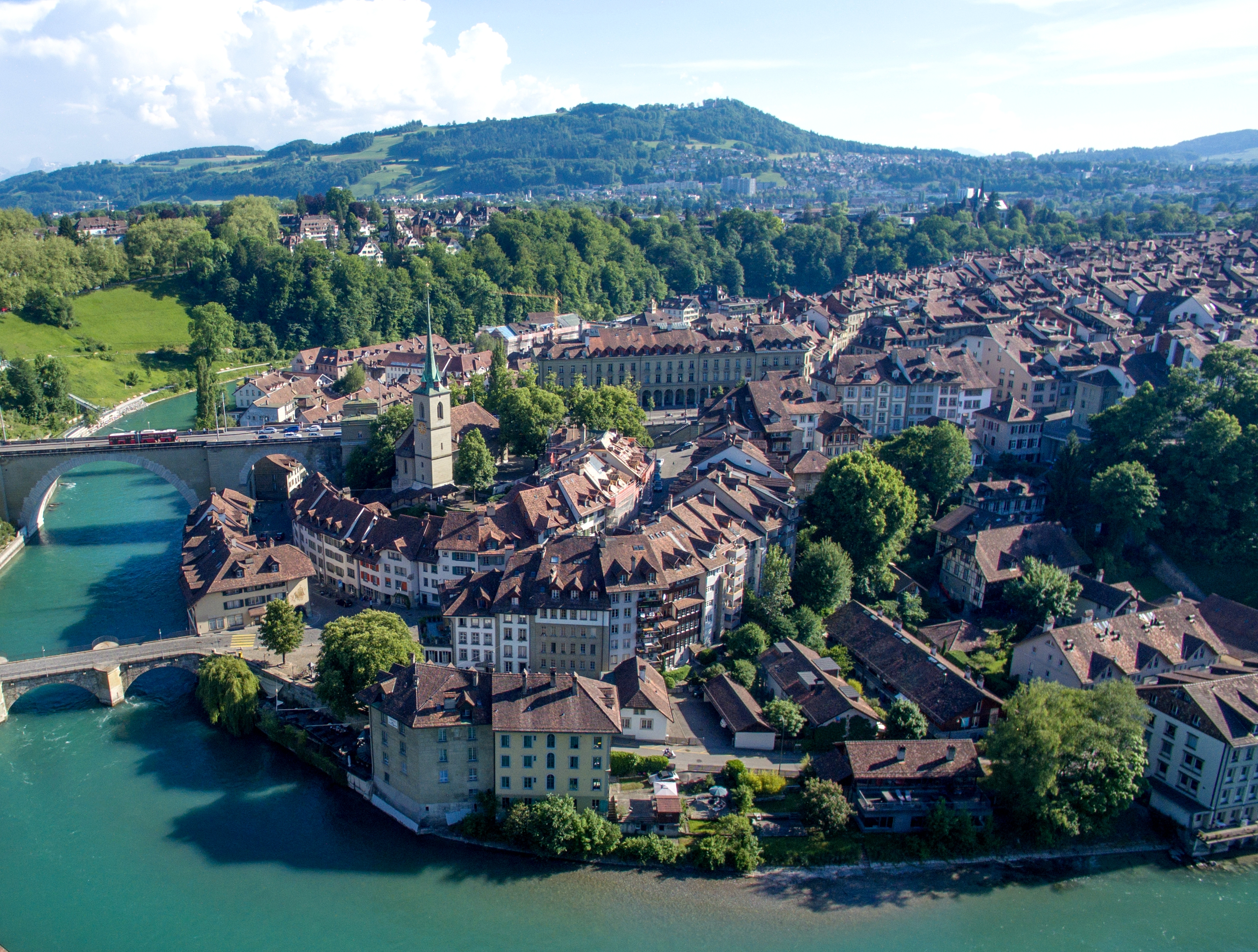
The city of Bern may have inspired Mondstadt.

=== Music ===
The background music for Mondstadt was composed by Yu-Peng Chen, performed by the London Philharmonic Orchestra, and recorded at AIR Studios. The first Genshin Impact original soundtrack album was released on June 19, 2020, featuring 15 tracks of Mondstadt's background music. On September 28, 2020, an album commemorating the official release of the Mondstadt chapter, was released. This soundtrack consists of three discs with a total of 63 tracks.

The music for Dragonspine was composed by Yu-Peng Chen, performed by the International Master Philharmonic Orchestra, and recorded at Jin Tian Studios. On April 2, 2021, Vortex of Legends, a soundtrack album for Dragonspine, was released with 17 tracks. To promote this release, miHoYo released a promotional MV titled "Snow-Buried Tales" on March 31, which quickly surpassed 1 million views. The album was also recommended by Apple Music. Prior to the release of Genshin Impact version 2.0, the retrospective soundtrack The Shimmering Voyage was released on July 19, 2021, which also included some of the background music from Dragonspine.

==== Sampling in other media ====
In October 2020, American rapper Destroy Lonely sampled Mondstadt's night theme in his track "Dover Street Market".

== Setting ==
Known as the "Nation of the Wind", Mondstadt is guarded by the wind god Barbatos, with freedom as its core belief. Its element is air (Anemo).

Mondstadt's terrain is said to have been shaped by the winds of Barbatos, and consists mainly of plains and forests. Mondstadt is divided into five main regions: Starfell Valley, Galesong Hill, Windwail Highland, Brightcrown Mountains, and Dragonspine. The central city of Mondstadt, located in Starfell Valley and surrounded by Cider Lake, serves as the region's main hub. To the northeast lies Cape Oath, a historical site, while the Thousand Winds Temple, a ruined shrine to an ancient wind god, lies to the east. Galesong Hill includes the areas of Wolvendom, Dawn Winery and Springvale, with Dawn Winery being renowned throughout Teyvat for its wines. The Windwail Highland, in the southeast, are known for the great oak tree at Windrise, symbolising the Lionfang Knight, and extend to the coast, where Cape Oath and Musk Reef are located. To the north is the Eagle's Gate region, a bay flanked by the coastlines of Eagle's Gate and Cape Oath. The Brightcrown Mountains, to the northwest, consist of Brightcrown Canyon and Stormterror's Lair, which was once a city built by King Decarabian and now serves as the lair of the dragon Dvalin. The southernmost region, Dragonspine, is known for its extreme cold, and players exposed to its Sheer Cold effect will continually lose health unless they find sources of heat to mitigate the effect.

Mondstadt is guarded by the Four Winds, powerful supernatural beings that include dragons and wolves. Major cultural festivals in Mondstadt include Windblume Festival, which celebrates the ideas of freedom and love for the Anemo Archon, and Ludi Harpastum, a festival of games. The winner of those games is given the opportunity to choose a maiden who, during the festival, throws a harpastum ball into the crowd. The person who picks it up was said to be blessed with a year of good luck.

=== History ===
Around 2,600 years before the game's events, Mondstadt was divided between two Archons: Decarabian and Andrius. Decarabian imprisoned his people within high walls in what is now Stormterror's Lair, until a nameless youth seeking freedom, aided by a wind spirit, led a rebellion. The youth perished, while the wind ghost became Mondstadt's Archon, Barbatos. Andrius eventually surrendered to Barbatos and became one of the Four Winds. Rather than become another tyrant, Barbatos left Mondstadt to become a free country. Later the Lawrence clan, a noble family, took control of Mondstadt and established a harsh system of enslavement. Vennessa, a slave, fought alongside Barbatos to overthrow the clan and founded the Knights of Favonius, who continue to rule Mondstadt.

500 years after the sibling of the protagonist Traveler is taken away from them, they wake up on Cape Oath and rescue a floating being called Paimon from drowning, who then agrees to be their travel guide during their time in Teyvat. On the way to Mondstadt City, they witness an enormous dragon (named Stormterror) being soothed by a bard dressed in green who would later introduce himself as Venti. The bard helps the Traveler get rid of the dragon temporarily, earning the Traveler a reputation boost in the area. It is eventually revealed that Stormterror had been corrupted due to interference from the Abyss Order, one of the game's primary antagonistic factions, and that corruption is removed by a special power possessed by the Traveler. The Traveler, accompanied by several allies from Mondstadt including Venti, discovers Stormterror's location and manage to defeat him, causing the dragon to realize he had been corrupted by the Abyss and to fly away peacefully. Afterward, Venti is attacked outside the city church by a Fatui Harbinger known as La Signora, and the Traveler learns that Venti is actually Barbatos, the Anemo Archon, in human form.

Later, during the Windblume Festival, the Traveler and Paimon return to Mondstadt, where strange behavior among its citizens leads them into a shocking trial: Albedo is accused of murder and illegal disposal of bodies. Witnesses including Beatrice and Diluc testify against him, and though Kaeya and Sucrose attempt to defend him, Jean declares him guilty. However, the Traveler and allies soon uncover that the charges were part of a larger scheme to expose an imposter linked to the dragon Durin's corrupted life force. The ensuing retrial reveals false witnesses and a citywide monster attack. With the Knights, Venti, and others rallying to defend Mondstadt, Albedo's true motives emerge: he had been secretly preparing to neutralize Durin's influence and protect the city. In the aftermath, Albedo succeeds in transforming Durin into a human through alchemy, while members of the Hexenzirkel and Venti aid in Mondstadt's defense. The festival concludes with music, renewal, and Albedo's quiet triumph in both science and loyalty to his home.

== Release and promotion ==
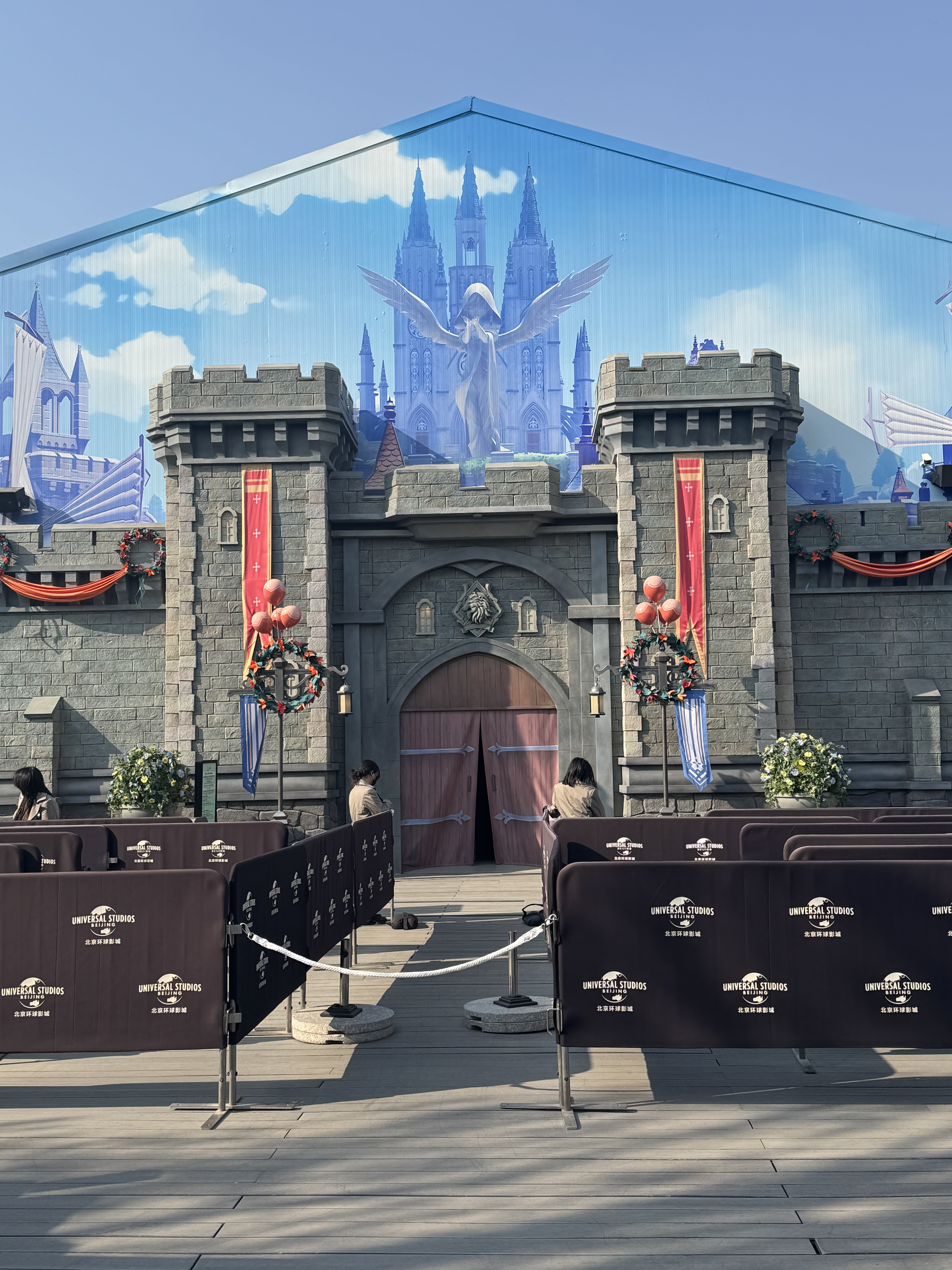
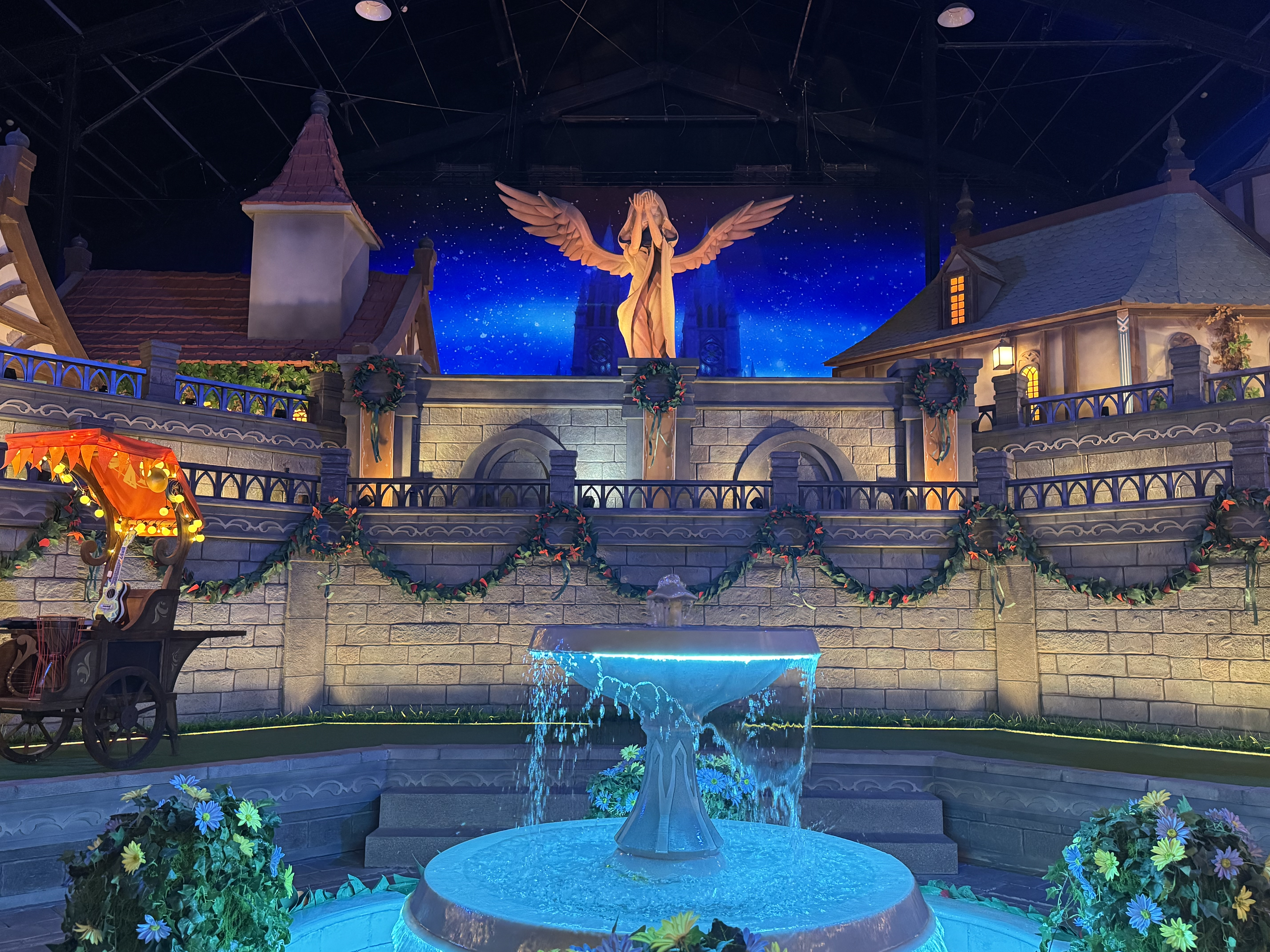
miHoYo collaborated with Universal Studios Beijing in Spring 2026, and introduced an immersive Mondstadt-themed interactive zone in the resort. The interactive zone recreated scenes in the Mondstadt City, including the City Gate (left) and the Anemo Archon Statue (right).

Mondstadt was one of two regions available at the game's release on September 28, 2020, alongside Liyue. On November 11, version 1.1 introduced a reputation system for both regions, a feature later extended to other nations. The following month, version 1.2 added Dragonspine, a mountainous area forming Mondstadt's southern border, along with a new temperature mechanic unique to cold regions. The trade area of Dornman Port was teased for future release as well.

miHoYo collaborated with Japanese cafe brand Sweets Paradise to release themed dishes resembling those from Mondstadt in September 2021. To promote Mondstadt, Genshin Impact released a promotional exhibition in Hangzhou, China in July 2022. miHoYo also collaborated with Universal Studios Beijing in Spring 2026, and introduced an immersive Mondstadt-themed interactive zone in the resort. The interactive zone recreated the scenes and food in Mondstadt City, and featured interaction with characters, including Klee and Varka. Special Mondstadt-themed merchandise and face paintings were also introduced.

In version 6.2 (titled "Luna III"), which was released on December 3, 2025, Genshin Impact released a feature known as "Hexerei" that added various buffs to the combat capabilities of Mondstadt's characters. This had been hinted at by online leakers by the time of the release of version 6.0. The Hexerei feature required players to complete a set of challenges involving each character, the reward for which would be the unlocking of a special new skill that would aid the character in combat. Mondstadt was expanded in version 6.5 (titled "Luna VI") on April 8, 2026; the new sub-area of Dornman Port was added after having been mentioned in-game several times since the game's release. Another expansion referred to as the "Temple of Space" was also added in the same version.

== Reception ==
Mondstadt was released in September 2020. Sisi Jiang of Kotaku wrote that Mondstadt's fantasy setting helped provide a sense of relief amidst the COVID-19 pandemic and described the region's whimsical landscapes, lighthearted musical themes, and abundance of secrets as providing a sense of normalcy and solace during lockdowns, characterizing her relationship with the game as one of "comfort." She noted how the land was open and uncluttered, and that there seemed to be an endless supply of treasure in Mondstadt. Combat felt less threatening when it was accompanied by Mondstadt's "bouncy brass notes and whimsical flutes". In addition, Meristation noted the game's cel-shaded, anime-inspired art style, emphasizing the diversity of its character designs and the cultural contrasts between Mondstadt and Liyue, which draws from Chinese influences. Takayuki Sawahata of AUTOMATON wrote that the region's familiar scenery made his in-game experience smoother and, after completing quests in other regions, he gradually realized that the Mondstadt Archon Quest was in his words "abnormal". When Sawahata first started playing, he felt underwhelmed by Mondstadt's familiar fantasy style, but also felt a sense of déjà vu. He also thought that Mondstadt's main story quest did not synergize well with the storytelling. He characterized the region as standing out from the rest of the game, writing "Genshin Impact's story is not truly a fantasy of swords and magic. The only part of the game that really fits that mold is the Mondstadt arc." He went on to say that the game's story is actually science fiction and that Mondstadt was thus not well-suited as an introduction to the game.

A screenshot of a player, playing as Ganyu, in the process of shooting the pigeons around Timmie, who can be seen in the background

One of the NPCs in Mondstadt is Timmie, a child who stands feeding pigeons just outside of the bridge that leads into Mondstadt City. Fanbyte's Jenny Zheng wrote that she found it fun to torment Timmie by killing the pigeons in front of him for food, writing that several players liked doing this to annoy him. Jess Reyes, writing for Inverse, wrote that Timmie had become a "love-to-hate meme" amongst fans and that it was easy to bully him. She compared the result to a "bucket of KFC", referencing the chicken leg-like items dropped by the pigeons upon death. Iain Harris, writing for PCGamesN, described the phenomenon as "griefing" and emphasized that it had become so prevalent in the community that a subreddit was created solely for hating Timmie, with over 5,000 people having joined it as of February 2021. Some players tried to kill the pigeons using trick shots as a sort of competition; others used bugs or glitches. Harris and Zheng both called Timmie annoying and cited that as the main reason why players were doing this to him; Zheng called him "the fan favorite enemy of the people". Sisi Jiang compared this to some other video games, in which animals leave behind a body when killed, writing of the pigeons "If they weren't meant to be boiled or roasted for Paimon's dinner, then maybe the developers should have made hunting feel gruesome and horrible."

In an analysis of the game's unreleased areas, commentator Yan Ku wrote that she expected the trading area known as Dornman Port to be released alongside the banner for Varka, the Grand Master of the Knights of Favonius, because she believed that the area was connected to Snezhnaya. This did not happen, however, as Varka was released in version "Luna V" and, although an event that takes place in Mondstadt was added in that version, Dornman Port was not added. Editor Tea Pudding of the Japanese gaming site INSIDE wrote that even though Mondstadt was the first region in the game to be released, they were surprised at the amount of information about it that had yet to be revealed at the time, including the release of Dornman Port.

The addition of the Hexerei feature to Mondstadt's characters has also gathered praise. Keiichi Yokoyama of AUTOMATON wrote that the gradual introduction of new characters into the game resulted in older characters being harder to use in combat, adding that this was the first time that Genshin Impact had updated a character's set of skills in "a long time." Bruno Yonezawa of Screen Rant wrote of the idea before it was implemented, that it would be a "great move" for HoYoverse, citing power creep as the reason why players had stopped using most of Mondstadt's characters in combat.
