= 3DM =

Chinese video game warez group

3DMGAME
- Website type: Game Localization, Cracked Games
- Available in: Simplified Chinese
- Headquarters: Fengtai District, Beijing, China
- Owners: Beijing Sandingmeng Software Service Co., Ltd.
- Creators: Su, Feifei; Liu, Yan
- Commercial: Yes
- Launched: 2001

3DM is a Chinese video gaming news website. It was a Chinese video game piracy group, a group of individuals specialized in cracking the digital rights management (DRM) applied to commercial PC video games. It was "one of the world's biggest" such groups in and around 2016, according to Kotaku.

Their founder and leader is reported to be a woman using the pseudonym "Bird Sister" (Chinese: 不死鸟; pinyin: bù sǐ niǎo; lit. 'phoenix'). Unusual for piracy groups, 3DM's members have public profiles on the social network Sina Weibo, and use a blog to inform the public about their activities.

== History ==
3DM made gaming media headlines in January 2016 when Bird Sister wrote that she anticipated that in two years no more cracked games would be available, attributing this shift to new DRM technology by Denuvo, then being adopted by many games publishers. The group also announced that it would quit cracking games for a year, and later claimed it had defeated Denuvo's technology.

In 2017, Japanese game developer Koei Tecmo won a lawsuit against 3DM in a Chinese court. 3DM was sentenced to $245,000 U.S. dollars in damages, and to cease distribution of pirated versions of Koei Tecmo's games.
