= Genshin Impact =

2020 video game

- Developer: miHoYo
- Publishers: miHoYo (China); HoYoverse (Global)
- Producer: Cai Haoyu
- Designer: Dai Wei (a.k.a. Aquaria)
- Writer: Luo Bai (a.k.a. Xiao Luohao)
- Composers: HOYO-MiX: Chen Yupeng; Dimeng Yuan; Qian Ding; Yijun Jiang; Xin Zhao; Arcangelo Chen; Peijia You
- Engine: Unity
- Platforms: Android; iOS; PlayStation 4 (formerly) (Note: Discontinued April 8, 2026); Windows; PlayStation 5; Xbox Series X/S; HarmonyOS NEXT
- Release: September 28, 2020: Android, iOS, PS4, Windows; September 28, 2020; PS5; April 28, 2021; Xbox Series X/S; November 20, 2024; HarmonyOS 5; September 10, 2025
- Genre: Action role-playing
- Modes: Single-player, multiplayer

Genshin Impact (/ˈɡɛnʃɪn/ GHEN-shin; Chinese: 原神; pinyin: Yuánshén; lit. 'Primordial God') is a 2020 action role-playing video game developed and published by miHoYo. It is distributed outside China by miHoYo's international subsidiary Cognosphere, also known as HoYoverse. At its core, the game features an anime style, open-world environment, an action-focused battle system consisting of elemental magic with character-switching, and a mythical main story. Genshin Impact is a free-to-play game monetized through gacha mechanics, which is updated regularly using the games as a service model. It was originally released for Android, iOS, PlayStation 4, and Windows, followed by the PlayStation 5 in 2021, and Xbox Series X/S in 2024. In China, a native port for HarmonyOS NEXT was released in September 2025. Support for PlayStation 4 was removed in April 2026.

Genshin Impact takes inspiration from a variety of sources, including the game The Legend of Zelda: Breath of the Wild, anime, Gnosticism, and an array of real-world cultures and mythologies. The game takes place in the fantasy world of Teyvat, home to seven nations each tied to a different element and ruled by individual gods called "Archons". The story follows the Traveler, an interstellar adventurer who is separated from their twin sibling after the two land in Teyvat. Together with their guide Paimon, the Traveler journeys across the nations of Teyvat in search of their lost sibling. Along the way, the two make friends with Teyvat's people, become involved in the affairs of its nations, and unravel the mysteries of the land.

Genshin Impact has received generally positive reviews, with critics praising its combat mechanics and open-world system, but some criticism has been directed at its endgame and its monetization model. The game has also been involved in controversies over censorship of content related to Chinese politics, as well as privacy and security concerns. The game performed very well commercially; by its fourth anniversary in 2024, the game had reached US$6.3 billion in total revenue. It has received several awards, including Best Mobile Game at the Game Awards 2021 and Still Playing Award at the 2023 Golden Joystick Awards, and is widely regarded as one of the best mobile games ever made.

== Gameplay ==
Players may freely explore an open-world map. Here Aether, the male version of the protagonist Traveler, is seen gliding.

Genshin Impact is an open-world video game that allows players to control one of four characters in a party. Players can quickly switch between the four characters during combat. Characters can have their abilities enhanced in various ways, mainly through gaining experience points and improving their artifacts and weapons.

In Genshin Impact, players can explore the open-world map freely. In addition to exploration, players can attempt various challenges for rewards. Bosses and challenges that reward highly valuable resources are scattered across Teyvat, but claiming them consumes a currency called Original Resin, which slowly regenerates over time up to a limit. Completing these challenges grants players progress towards increasing their Adventure Rank, which unlocks new quests and challenges. The World Level increases at Adventure Ranks 20, 25, 30, 35, 40, 45, 50, 55, and 58, increasing the strength of the world's enemies and the rarity of rewards given by defeating them.

Players can perform actions such as running, climbing, swimming, and gliding. Some characters possess abilities that can alter the environment, such as freezing water to create an ice path that helps traverse terrain. Many teleportation points exist to which players can warp in a form of fast travel; among these are landmarks known as Statues of The Seven that can heal and revive characters and provide benefits such as increased player stamina. Items such as food and other materials can be procured from the open world. Furthermore, special battle instances called Domains reward materials that increase character and weapon strength. Meals cooked from ingredients gathered from collectable or purchasable materials can provide desirable effects, such as increased damage, health regeneration, and increased defense. Players can also procure ores that can be refined and then used to create weapons.

A multiplayer mode is available in the form of co-op, where up to four players can play together; players' party size shrinks according to the number of players in a session. Player matching can be done by requesting to connect with another player or through matchmaking. The game features cross-platform play, so players on any platform can play with each other. This mode unlocks when players reach Adventure Rank 16.

=== Gacha system ===
By completing certain quests or participating in select limited-time events, players can unlock additional playable characters. However, most characters are obtained through the character banners of the game's gacha system, called "Wishes", and the same applies for weapons. An in-game currency called "Primogems", obtainable through in-app purchases or gameplay rewards, is required to "pull" on the game's banners. A pity system guarantees that players will receive rare items after a set number of pulls.

=== Elemental combat ===
Elements react with each other to produce different effects. Here, Pyro and Electro produce Overloaded, creating an area of effect explosion.

Playable characters have control over one of seven elements: Anemo (air), Geo (earth), Pyro (fire), Hydro (water), Cryo (ice), Electro (electricity), and Dendro (plants). (Note: Characters who use Dendro were only added after the release of Sumeru in version 3.0 of the game. Prior to that, the element was largely absent from gameplay.) When these elements react with one another, they produce various effects and deal damage to enemies. For instance, if a Hydro attack hits a target, the enemy will be inflicted with the "Wet" status effect, and if they are hit with a subsequent Cryo attack, these two status effects combine to freeze the opponent, temporarily preventing them from performing any actions. Certain elemental abilities are also required to solve puzzles within Teyvat. There are two sub-types of Elemental Reactions in the game: Stellar and Lunar.

=== Genius Invokation TCG ===
A tabletop-based collectible card game called Genius Invokation TCG was released in the game's Version 3.3 update in December 2022 as an additional gamemode involving turn-based battles. Equipped with a deck of three characters and thirty supporting cards, players win by knocking down all of their opponent's character cards. Each round requires a dice roll that forces players to use their cards within the limitations of their roll. Similar to the main game, elemental reactions are included as a mechanic of the gamemode. Players are able to challenge NPCs, playable characters, and other real players in co-op mode.

=== Miliastra Wonderland ===
A sandbox and game creation gameplay system called Miliastra Wonderland was released in the game's "Luna II" update (Note: Genshin Impact uses a numbering system for new versions (version 1.0, version 1.1, etc.) with the exception of Nod-Krai versions. The first Nod-Krai version to be released was called version "Luna I", with following updates called "Luna II", "Luna III", etc.) in October 2025. The system lets players create and share their work using an array of assets, terrain, and enemies already within Genshin Impact from the perspective of the Wonderland Manekin, a new customizable character obtained by unlocking Miliastra Wonderland.

== Story ==
=== Setting and characters ===
Genshin Impact takes place in the world of Teyvat, composed of seven major nations, each ruled by a god called an "Archon" and tied to a different element and ideal. The floating island of Celestia hangs above Teyvat, described as home to the gods as well as mortals who have ascended to godhood. Underground lies the ruins of Khaenri'ah, a mysterious nation destroyed by Celestia 500 years ago.

Regardless of which nation they hail from, individuals who have great ambitions may be granted a Vision, a magical gemstone that allows them to control a specific element and gives them the potential to ascend to godhood and reside in Celestia. Archons, on the other hand, possess a Gnosis, a device similar to a Vision that affirms their authority as an Archon and allows them to "resonate" with Celestia.

The protagonists are the Traveler and Paimon, the Traveler's guide and companion. The Traveler and their twin sibling traveled across planets before being separated in Teyvat, forcing the Traveler to go on a journey to find them. Players may choose to play as either Aether (the brother) or Lumine (the sister), and the sibling who is not picked will become separated from the other. There are no other differences between the two in terms of gameplay. The primary antagonists are Celestia, Teyvat's ruler, the Abyss Order, a legion of monsters made up of corrupted Khaenri'ahns who seek to overthrow the existing world order, and the Fatui, a delegation of diplomats from Snezhnaya who pursue an aggressive foreign policy throughout Teyvat. The Traveler's twin is the leader of the Abyss Order, while the Fatui are led by the Eleven Harbingers, powerful lieutenants of the Tsaritsa Anastasya (the Cryo Archon) who have been given special authority to carry out her will.

=== Plot ===
Aether and Lumine are two interstellar adventurers from beyond Teyvat, the planet where Genshin Impact takes place. When they attempted to leave Teyvat together, they were stopped and separated by a being known as the "Sustainer of Heavenly Principles", also known as the Unknown God. The Traveler (either Aether or Lumine, depending on the player's choice) awakens five hundred years later and, after befriending a being called Paimon, who agrees to be their travel guide, sets out on a journey to find their missing sibling. The sibling, however, had awakened before the Traveler and joined the Abyss Order, a major antagonistic faction in the game, placing them in conflict with the Traveler. The Traveler journeys with Paimon through the various nations of Teyvat, becoming involved in local conflicts wherever they go. The Traveler lacks a Vision, a device used by most characters to control a specific element, and unlocks the ability to use each element with each new nation they visit. In Mondstadt, they help end a crisis involving a dragon named Dvalin and learn that the Abyss Order is led by their sibling. In Liyue, they become involved in a political crisis surrounding the apparent death of the region's ruler. Later, they reunite with their sibling, who refuses to leave with them and instead urges the Traveler to continue exploring Teyvat and discover "the truth of this world" for themselves. The Traveler later goes to Inazuma, where they help bring about changes in the policies of its ruler, the Raiden Shogun, and end a civil war there.

In Sumeru, the Traveler discovers that they are a "Descender", someone originating from outside Teyvat, and learns about their sibling's mysterious device called the "Loom of Fate". Afterwards, they leave for Fontaine, where they help resolve a flood threatening the nation and later encounter their sibling again, though they both lose their memories of the meeting. In Natlan, the Traveler helps repel an invasion by the Abyss. While investigating the attack, the Traveler discovers that it was orchestrated by their sibling to weave new Ley Lines for Khaenri'ah's restoration via the Loom of Fate. (Note: In the game, Ley Lines are a vast underground network of elemental energy connected to Teyvat's world tree, also called Irminsul.) Their journey takes them to Nod-Krai, where they confront another Abyssal threat and become involved in a conflict with the antagonistic Fatui including rogue Harbinger Il Dottore, who is finally incinerated with Irminsul in Sumeru.

In Snezhnaya, the Traveler and Paimon learn about an energy conservation policy called Project Stuzha and the purpose of collecting the Gnoses. After encounter Ronova, the godlike Ruler of Death, in a theater and later research headquarters, the Traveler joins forces with the Fatui to defeat Ronova who had been exploiting loopholes to temporary kill researchers alongside Rhinedottir, a powerful witch and the Ruler of Life. With Anastasya secretly manipulating time and space around Rhinedottir using the obtained Gnoses in a meeting, Fatui leader Pierro manages to mortally wound Ronova, whose authority is stripped for abuse of power. Before seemingly dying, Ronova damages a Celestial Nail, a pillar that destroyed ancient civilizations, in eastern Snezhnaya, triggering reactions across the various nails stationed around Teyvat which begin to contaminate the surrounding lands with Holy Soil, a phenomenon called the Hallowing.

With all seven nations under threat of the Hallowing, the Traveler learns that the Archons must undergo "Trials of Usurpation" to undo the Hallowing around the nails and Anastasya holds a summit with the other six leaders to cooperate and find a way to pass the Trials. After the Archons complete their respective trials, the Traveler and Archons are invited to Celestia and learn that the Heavenly Principles order each Archon to send them an allogene (Vision holder) within 42 days, whose disembodied consciousnesses are utilized by the Principles to guide fate, or risk annihilation. After learning the truth and leaving, the Archons join Anastasya to fight against the will of fate.

== Development ==
At the time of Genshin Impact's initial development in January 2017, the developer miHoYo was focusing on Honkai Impact 3rd, one of their other games, and they asked themselves what could be done to improve the game. In April 2017, version 1.4 of Honkai Impact 3rd was released, which had a strong impact on the team and led them to create an open-world concept for Genshin Impact.

Genshin Impact's development team reached nearly 300 people by 2021. One estimate put the total number of people working on the game that month at 700, approximately 29% of miHoYo's entire staff. The developers stated that the greatest challenge was integrating the ideas and concepts of all contributors into the game and conveying each character's background through their visual design. The developers were also affected by the COVID-19 pandemic; due to local restrictions, the developers were required to work remotely, reportedly with equipment that a member of miHoYo's global publishing team described as insufficient for the demands of the role.

To construct the game's world and lore, the team consulted various real-world mythological sources, ultimately choosing Gnosticism as the core foundation for the game's setting and narrative. The game's elemental reaction system was inspired by actual chemical reactions. The game used elements from real-world cultures in its world-building; for instance, Liyue is based on ancient China, and Fontaine on Industrial Revolution-era Europe.

miHoYo first revealed Genshin Impact to the public in June 2019 at E3 2019, although an official webcomic based on the game was uploaded to Webtoon in November 2018. The game had a development and marketing budget of around US$100 million. Between the announcement and release, closed beta tests were held, allowing invited players to explore and interact with the open world.

=== Music ===
A music team headed by Yu-Peng Chen from HOYO-MiX composed the game's original score, which was performed by various groups including the London Philharmonic Orchestra, the Shanghai Symphony Orchestra, and the Tokyo Philharmonic Orchestra. HoYoverse stated that the goal of the soundtrack was to immerse players within the game and provide what Chen describes as "beautiful melodies". Chen composed the score based on the cultural influences of different regions; for example, in Mondstadt, Chen used woodwind instruments to reflect Mondstadt's association with wind and freedom. In Liyue, Chen combined elements of Chinese folk music, such as traditional instruments and a pentatonic scale, with Western Romantic harmonies and orchestral arrangements. The battle themes are inspired by orchestration elements from composers such as Beethoven. On September 12, 2023, Chen announced on Bilibili that he was leaving miHoYo and the HOYO-MiX team, after having worked on the music of the game and its expansions since its release.

=== Account security concerns ===
Genshin Impact has been criticized for initially lacking security features commonly found on other sites, such as two-factor authentication. A security flaw was discovered on the miHoYo website that exposed the phone numbers used by players for password recovery. However, the issue was not resolved until November 9, 2020, three weeks after it was first reported. In the wake of security exposures, miHoYo issued notices advising players to be careful about sharing account details and to bind their accounts to an email address and phone number. In May 2021, two-factor authentication was introduced for logins from new devices.

Like many other online games, Genshin Impact uses an anti-cheat system implemented by a kernel driver. Shortly after release, players discovered that the game's anti-cheat system remained active after the game was closed or uninstalled, prompting concerns that the game had installed spyware (which miHoYo claimed was actually the game's anti-pirating software). Additionally, some Japanese players using iOS devices observed that the game accessed the contents of their clipboards. miHoYo announced that they planned to release an update fixing the issues.

== Release ==
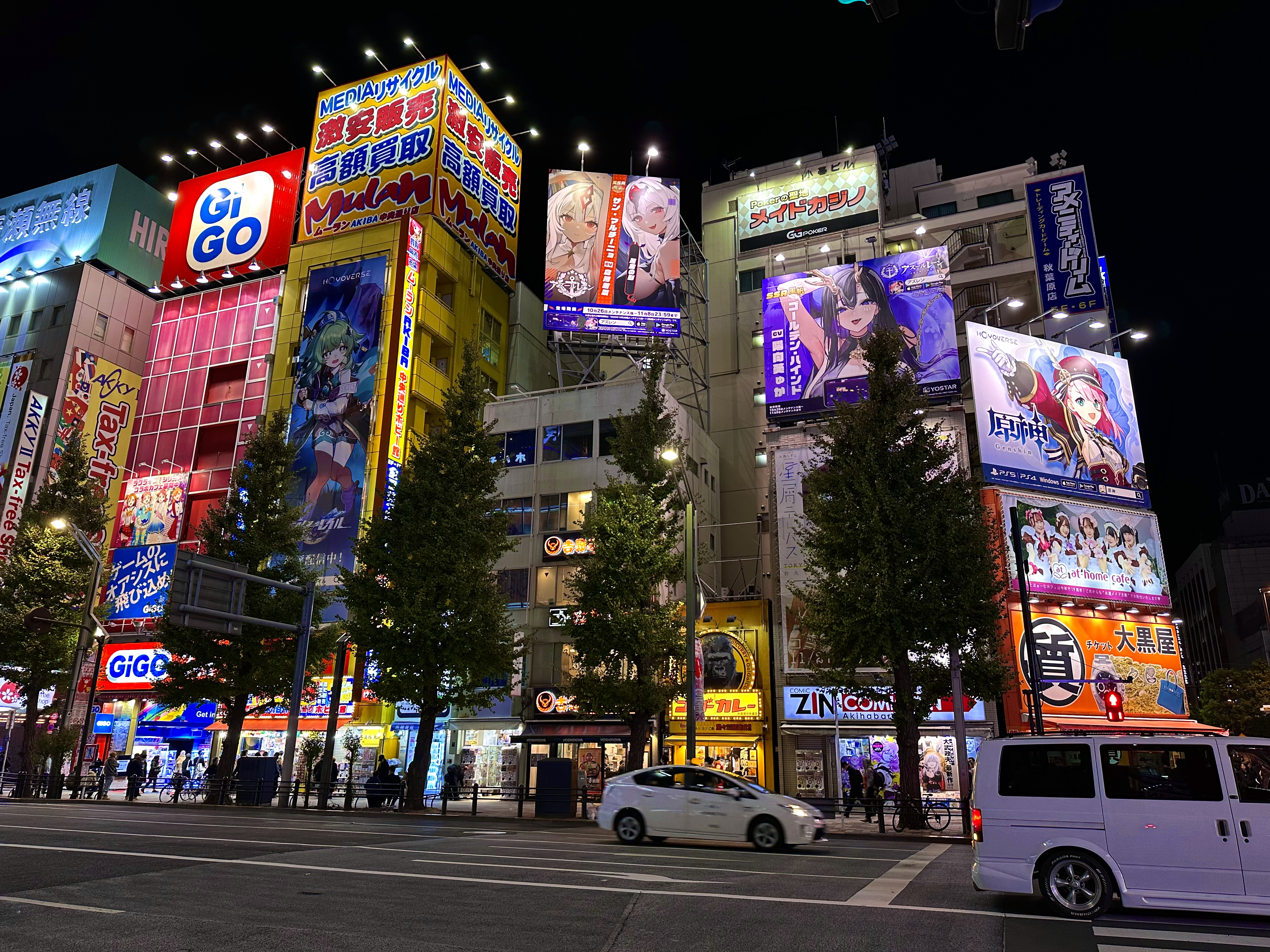
Genshin Impact and its characters are very popular in some countries, as exemplified by an advertisement featuring Charlotte (right, third above the white van) in Akihabara in Tokyo.

Closed beta testing for the game had begun by June 21, 2019. In August of the same year, miHoYo announced at ChinaJoy that Genshin Impact would be released on the PlayStation 4. On January 14, 2020, miHoYo officially announced a Nintendo Switch version, though no further release information was provided and the game remained unreleased on the platform due to hardware limitations. A second closed beta test for players using iOS, Android, and PC was launched on March 19, 2020. In August 2020, it was announced that the game would be released on September 28 of that year for iOS, Android, and PC. The game was also released on PlayStation 4 on the same day.

On November 11, 2020, the game was made available on PlayStation 5 through backwards compatibility, allowing it to run on that console's hardware using code from the PlayStation 4 version; a dedicated version for the PlayStation 5 was released on April 28, 2021. At gamescom 2024, miHoYo announced a November 20 release date for the game on the Xbox Series X and Series S consoles on August 20, 2024.

Shortly after the game's release, miHoYo announced a schedule of content updates for the following months, with future patches planned to introduce additional characters, events, features and new areas to explore. At the time of release, only two of the game's eight main areas (Note: The existence of Nod-Krai (which would be seventh in terms of release order) would not be revealed until later.) had been made available, and miHoYo anticipated that the game's story would take several years to complete.

In August 2025, miHoYo announced that support for the PlayStation 4 would end on April 8, 2026, citing hardware performance limitations and application size. The ability to download the game was removed on September 10, 2025, and in-game purchases were discontinued on February 25, 2026.

A release on the Nintendo Switch 2 was theorized by players in June 2026, as one leaker revealed that an update had added a Nintendo Switch account login manager. miHoYo has not confirmed this as of November 2026.

== Reception ==
=== Pre-release ===
When the game was first unveiled at the ChinaJoy convention in 2019, it was criticized for its perceived similarities to The Legend of Zelda: Breath of the Wild, a game held in high regard by the development team and cited as one of the main inspirations for Genshin Impact. Zelda fans at the convention gave the Sony booth the middle finger, with one player destroying his PlayStation 4 console in protest. Travis Northup of IGN highlighted similarities between the two games such as the overworld, art style and game mechanics while also emphasizing Genshin Impact's unique identity and features.

=== Post-release ===
Reception

Aggregate scores
Aggregator	Score
Metacritic	iOS: 82/100; PC: 84/100; PS4: 81/100; PS5: 86/100
OpenCritic	87%

Review scores
Publication	Score
Destructoid	7.5/10
Famitsu	9/10, 9/10, 9/10, 8/10
Game Informer	9.25/10
GameSpot	7/10
Hardcore Gamer	4/5
IGN	9/10
Jeuxvideo.com	15/20
PC Gamer (US)	84/100
Pocket Gamer	4.5/5

Genshin Impact received "generally favorable reviews" according to review aggregator website Metacritic, and an 87% rating on OpenCritic. The world-building and design were praised by multiple critics, with Northup describing Teyvat as "a world that is absolutely bursting at the seams with possibilities", and Hardcore Gamer's Jordan Helm calling it "one big environmental puzzle". The game's commercial success has been attributed to its visual design and use of Chinese cultural references. In particular, Liyue was picked out by Kotaku's Sisi Jiang for being "one of the most exciting regions that I've visited in a video game in years". Jiang also discussed how Liyue "shows an idealized portrayal of Chinese social relations that exists in localized pockets". Fans raised concerns over whitewashing and cultural appropriation in regards to the character designs for Sumeru and Natlan.

The gameplay itself was also generally well received. Daniel Tack of Game Informer characterized Genshin Impact as an incredible experience, writing that "[t]he gameplay loop of collection, upgrading, and customization is captivating and compelling". Pocket Gamer's Dave Aubrey commended the execution of gameplay, while Destructoid's Chris Carter called the combat system "one of the most interesting things" about the game. Kaity Kline of NPR opined that the game had an abundance of content despite being free to play. Gene Park of The Washington Post lauded the game as revolutionary for the genre, allowing players to "imagine a mobile gaming world with titles with quality that matches the industry's top-tier experiences". Polygon's Khee Hoon Chan also praised the game for differentiating itself from its peers, becoming successful as mobile games rose to mainstream popularity and appealing to players unable to play resource-intensive RPGs.

The game's English voice acting was poorly received by fans and critics; Jiang characterized it as inaccurate to the original Chinese voice-over. She compared the Chinese voices to "real friends" and said the English dubs sounded like anime tropes. Some fans disliked the voice acting for certain characters such as Barbara so much that they directed criticism towards the actors who voiced them; Nathan Grayson of Kotaku wrote that the character's voice actress, Laura Stahl, was being harassed "for being good at taking notes from a director." Several of the game's English voice actors refused to record their lines during the 2024–2025 SAG-AFTRA video game strike, leading to several roles to be recast. This included the voice actress for Paimon being changed from Corinna Boettger to Penelope Rawlins, a change which was welcomed by Austin Wood of GamesRadar+. The game also has voice lines available in Japanese and Korean. The Japanese voice cast is routinely marketed as "star-studded". Korean reviewers such as Park Gwang-seok of Inven described the Korean dub as flawless and complete.

Genshin Impact has been criticized for its endgame content, its gacha monetization system, and limitations on players not willing to engage in microtransactions. Ari Notis of Kotaku, for instance, wrote that although the game provides a solid experience, it also has "some of the typical bullshit that comes along with a zero-dollar price tag" and that the gacha system can lead to a "cycle that belongs more in Reno, Nevada, than a magical fantasy land of gods and wizards". Heidi Kemps of GameSpot echoed this criticism, writing that the game is "hampered a bit by the restrictions its free-to-play model imposes". Steven Messner of PC Gamer said that playing the endgame becomes "a slog", and that the resin system "feels so unnecessary". Warning players about the predatory nature of the monetization, Gene Park of The Washington Post opined that the game could lead players to gamble with the game's gacha system because it was well-designed from an aesthetic standpoint. Siliconera's Stephanie Liu expressed disappointment in the lack of alternative outfits available for purchase in Genshin Impact compared to other games.

The Genius Invokation TCG minigame received positive reviews upon launch. Siliconera critic Stephanie Liu said that the minigame rekindled her excitement from the early days of the game. Youxiputao editors Guopu and Grey Pigeon also contended that Genius Invokation TCG can "make up for the shortcomings of the game's long-term experience" and "strengthen the relationship between players". Liu praised Genius Invokation TCG's balanced design and simplicity, stating that it "should remain fair" given that all players are given the same cards to work around. Jiang also said that she looked forward to miHoYo releasing more cards in the future.

When Miliastra Wonderland launched in 2025, it received largely positive reviews. Robin Bea, writing for Inverse, called it "one of the biggest features" the game had. She and Wood also compared it to Roblox and The Sims. Wood praised the fact that players would get their own battle pass specific to Miliastra Wonderland for free if they bought the game's regular Battle pass, and compared the amount of avatar customization options with the limited amount of skins that have been released for the game's main cast of characters.

=== Commercial performance ===
On mobile platforms, Genshin Impact saw 23 million downloads and grossed approximately US$60 million within a week of its release. Within two weeks, revenue exceeded US$100 million, recouping the game's development budget. Its strong performance continued through October 2020, when it was the second-highest-grossing mobile game worldwide (after Pokémon GO). The largest shares of its revenue came from China, Japan, South Korea, and the United States, with 69.5 percent of mobile revenue generated outside China, according to Sensor Tower. In the United States, its release marked the largest launch of a mobile role-playing game to date. Pocket Gamer estimated that across all platforms, the game surpassed about US$3.6 billion in revenue by September 2022. By the game's fourth anniversary in 2024, the game had reached US$6.3 billion in total revenue.

From release through the end of March 2021, Genshin Impact grossed over US$1 billion on mobile platforms, the third highest revenue from a mobile game during that time frame after Honor of Kings and PUBG Mobile. By the game's first anniversary, the mobile version of the game had grossed US$2 billion, a feat that Jess Weatherbed of the BBC called "unheard of". It ranked as the world's third highest-grossing mobile game of the year, according to an end-of-year analysis by Sensor Tower. The mobile version grossed a further US$567 million between January and March 2022. By January 2026, however, the game ranked fourth in Sensor Tower's mobile revenue growth rankings, and did not appear in its list of the top ten highest-grossing games for that month.

=== Cultural impact ===
Genshin Impact's commercial success has led to it being argued as a symbol of China's soft power. Song Tang of The Diplomat writes that players can casually learn about traditional Chinese culture while playing the game, and also comments that its "increasingly close relationship" with the Chinese government confirms its role as a soft power tool. Ben Dooley and Paul Mazur of The New York Times said in a 2022 article that the game is a "sign to many insiders" that the Japanese video game industry was facing many challenges from abroad, and that Genshin Impact was "beating Japan at its own (video) game".

=== Accolades ===
Accolades
Year	Award	Category	Result	Ref.
2020	Golden Joystick Awards	Ultimate Game of the Year	Nominated	
2020	Google Play Awards	Best Game	Won	
2020	The Game Awards 2020	Best Mobile Game	Nominated	
2020	The Game Awards 2020	Best RPG	Nominated	
2021	Apple Design Awards	Visual and Graphics	Won	
2021	Golden Joystick Awards	Still Playing Award	Nominated	
2021	The Game Awards 2021	Best Mobile Game	Won	
2021	The Game Awards 2021	Best Ongoing Game	Nominated	
2022	Golden Joystick Awards	Still Playing Award	Won	
2022	Google Play Awards	Best Ongoing	Won	
2022	The Game Awards 2022	Best Ongoing Game	Nominated	
2022	The Game Awards 2022	Best Mobile Game	Nominated	
2022	The Game Awards 2022	Players' Voice	Won	
2023	Golden Joystick Awards	Still Playing Award	Nominated	
2023	The Game Awards 2023	Best Ongoing Game	Nominated	
2023	The Game Awards 2023	Players' Voice	Nominated	
2024	20th British Academy Games Awards	Evolving Game	Nominated	
2024	Gamescom Awards	Best Mobile Game	Nominated	
2024	The Game Awards 2024	Players' Voice	Nominated	
2025	The Game Awards 2025	Players' Voice	Nominated	

=== Impact of government regulations ===
On October 6, 2020, journalist and Twitch streamer Kazuma Hashimoto published a video on Twitter demonstrating that political terms considered controversial in China, such as "Hong Kong", "Falun Gong", and "Taiwan", were censored in Genshin Impact's in-game chat. As miHoYo is based in China, it is subject to China's censorship policies, which include complying with a list of prohibited words. Extending outside of political language, innocuous terms such as "enemies" and "words" were also censored.

In September 2021, the Chinese government stated that video game companies should avoid "obscene and violent content and those breeding unhealthy tendencies, such as money-worship and effeminacy." That month, over 200 Chinese video game companies signed a self-censorship pact, agreeing to remove content that would fall foul of government regulations on gaming. HoYoverse released an update introducing outfits for several playable characters that were more modest than their original designs in January 2022. These alternate outfits were optional on global servers but mandatory in China. In response, Joseph Allen of TechRaptor discussed whether this was an instance of content censorship and speculated that this was likely done to appease the Chinese Communist Party.

In 2025, the U.S. Federal Trade Commission (FTC) announced that miHoYo had agreed to a settlement of US$20,000,000 over its use of loot boxes and misleading players about their odds of winning limited-time prizes such as characters and weapons. According to Samuel Levine, the director of the FTC's Bureau of Consumer Protection, players spent "hundreds of dollars on prizes they stood little chance of winning". Writing for The Verge, Wes Davis noted that loot boxes have been compared to a form of legal gambling. The complaint also accused the developers of marketing themselves to children through methods such as social media posts and collecting their personal information in violation of the Children's Online Privacy Protection Act (COPPA). Under the terms of the settlement, miHoYo was required to delete data for children under age 15 unless parental consent had been obtained, to "loot box odds and exchange rates for multi-tiered virtual currency", and to refrain from selling loot boxes to teens under 16 without parental consent. In response, miHoYo stated it agreed to the settlement because it valued the trust of its fans and that it would "increase [its] in-game disclosures around virtual currency and rewards for players in the U.S. in the coming months." The company implemented these changes in early May for Genshin Impact, in late May for Honkai: Star Rail and Tears of Themis, and in late June for Honkai Impact 3rd and Zenless Zone Zero.

== Collaborations ==
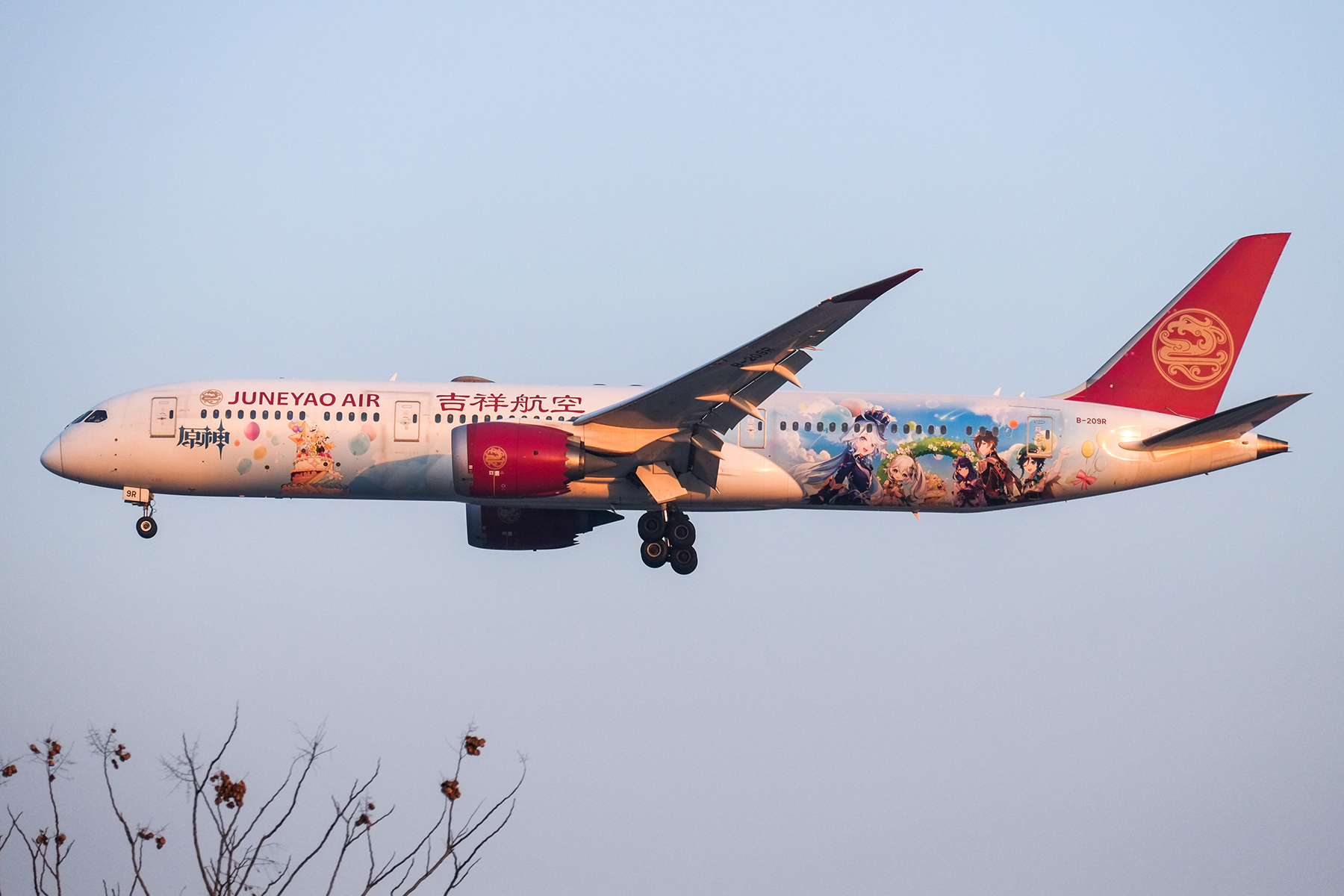
A Juneyao Airlines Boeing 787–9 featuring Genshin Impact livery, in collaboration with miHoYo

According to statistics from Beijing Business Today, Genshin Impact has participated in partnerships with Heytea, Pizza Hut, Mengniu Suibian, Amap, Redmi, Nippon Paint, KFC, and OnePlus. Additionally, according to incomplete statistics reported by Xinmin Evening News, Genshin Impact partnered with at least 14 brands, including Lawson, Alipay, and Amap, during the second half of 2022.

On September 20, 2023, to commemorate the third anniversary of Genshin Impact, QQ Music and WeSing held a celebratory event for players. On November 3, 2023, the game announced a collaboration with Juneyao Airlines, unveiling the world's first Genshin Impact-themed livery on a Boeing 787-9 Dreamliner, named "Genshin" (registration number B-209R). The aircraft began operating domestic and international routes on November 8, 2023.

The game's collaborations were not limited to mainland China. On July 29, 2021, Japan's Sweets Paradise announced that all twelve of its locations in Japan would operate as Genshin Impact collaboration cafés for one month beginning on September 1. In December 2025, language learning app Duolingo announced a partnership under which learners in select regions who completed a three-day streak would receive a redeemable reward. In August 2026, Crunchyroll, Sony's anime streaming service, announced an exclusive Genshin Impact collaboration which began on August 12, to coincide with the game's Version 7.0 update. In the update, players who had Crunchyroll Fan Tier memberships received an in-game bundle which among other things included 40 Primogems, while players with Mega and Ultimate Fan memberships received a gadget pet.

== Other media ==
Prior to the game's release, miHoYo released a manhua on its websites outlining the backstories of the characters and the world of Teyvat. In addition, miHoYo releases animated videos teasing the game's story, characters, and combat via Genshin Impact's official social media.

In September 2022, miHoYo announced a partnership with Japanese animation studio Ufotable to develop a prospective anime adaptation based on the game, accompanied by the release of a concept trailer. By January 2026, the anime remained in development, Ufotable stating that this was due to them prioritizing work on Demon Slayer: Kimetsu no Yaiba.
