= Arataki Itto =

Fictional character in a video game

- Genshin Impact character
- Arataki Itto in Genshin Impact
- First game: Genshin Impact (2021)
- Voiced by: EN: Max Mittelman; ZH: Liu Zhaokun; JA: Takanori Nishikawa; KO: Song Joon-seok

In-universe information
- Species: Oni
- Weapon: Claymore
- Origin: Inazuma
- Element: Geo

Arataki Itto (Chinese: 荒泷一斗; pinyin: Huānglóng Yīdǒu) is a character from the video game Genshin Impact, developed by miHoYo. He was released as a playable character in the game's version 2.3 update in December 2021. He is a young oni from Inazuma and the leader of the fictional group known as the "Arataki Gang". Arataki Itto's character design draws inspiration from the image of the red oni in Japanese mythology. His yōkai heritage as well as his appealing design, together with his presence in side quests and event storylines have been well received by both critics and players.

== Design and voice acting ==
In terms of character design, Arataki Itto wields a massive spiked club and has a pair of red oni horns on his forehead. His red facial and body markings along with the sizable rope in his back are inspired by kabuki theatre.

In Japanese mythology, red oni are often associated with extreme passion, wildness and cruelty; in his characterization, Arataki Itto is frequently described by fellow Inazumans as a despicable, domineering hooligan with a strong competitive streak. In Japanese tradition, during Setsubun, children throw roasted soybeans at people dressed as oni to drive away evil spirits. This aspect is also incorporated into Arataki Itto's character: he is allergic to soybeans and their derivatives, such as tofu.

In the Japanese version of the game, he is voiced by Takanori Nishikawa, a singer primarily known by his stage name T.M.Revolution. Nishikawa said in an interview that he found Itto to be a charismatic character who shoulders everything with strength but is delicate at heart, cares for his friends, and treasures the bonds he has with others, traits that Nishikawa felt that he shared with the character. Itto's English voice actor is Max Mittelman, who also voices Ryuji Sakamoto in Persona 5. Mittelman shared during a livestream that he was initially worried that fans would be unhappy with Itto's voice sounding too similar to Ryuji's. However, players ended up being delighted by the similarity, which surprised and relieved Mittelman. His Chinese voice actor is Liu Zhaokun and his Korean voice actor is Song Joon-seok.

== Appearances ==
=== Lore ===
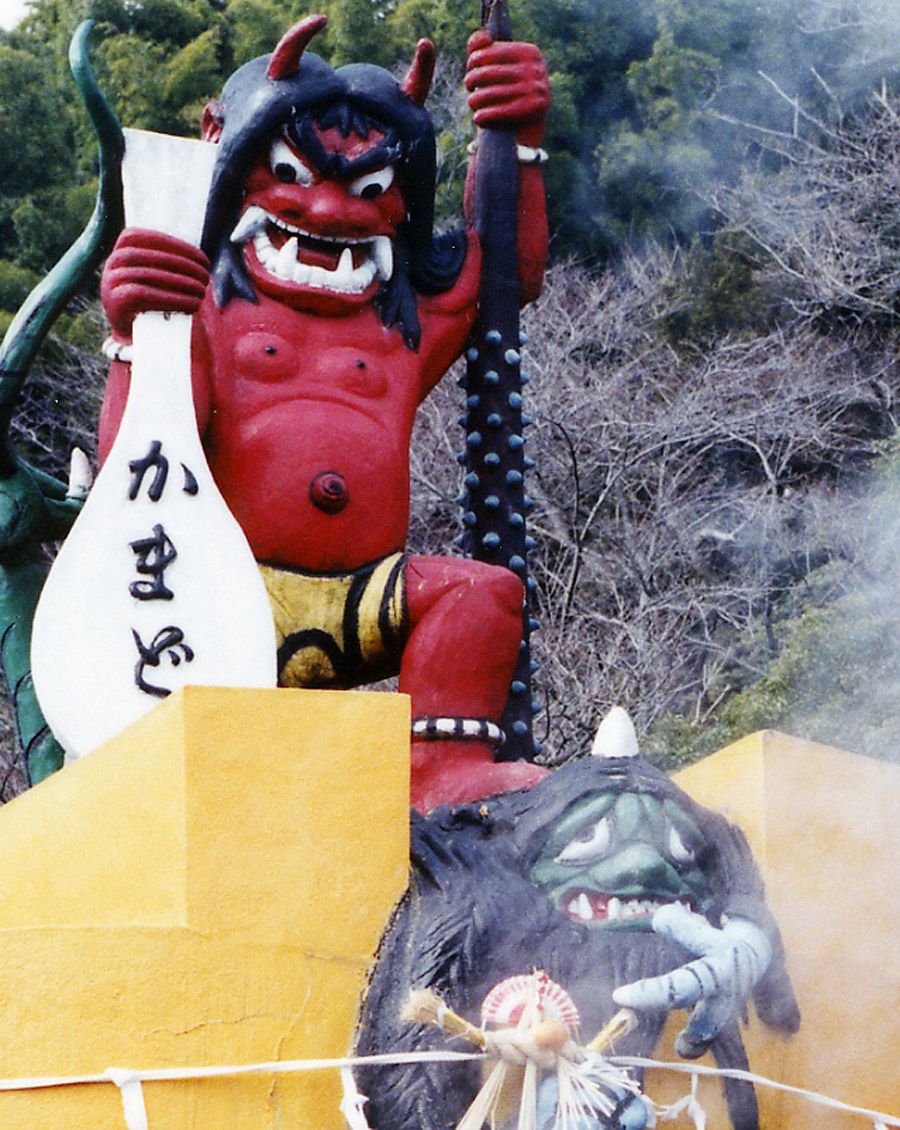
A statue of an oni in Kyushu, Japan

Arataki Itto is the leader of Inazuma's "Arataki Gang", establishing his position as a banchō and the only oni youth currently active in public life. His deputy is Kuki Shinobu, a former shrine maiden who tries to help him out. Itto is boisterous and bold, and he loves gambling and having fun. He often invents arrogant and exaggerated nicknames for himself in the format "Arataki ___ Itto".

During Inazuma's Vision Hunt Decree, (Note: Inazuma's archon, the Raiden Shogun, wanted Inazuma to remain unchanged for all eternity, so she ordered the confiscation of all Visions (external magical foci that allow users to wield control of the elements) in Inazuma to stabilize the nation via the Vision Hunt Decree. The Traveler manages to convince her to repeal this law in the game's storyline.) Arataki Itto's Vision was confiscated by Kujou Sara on behalf of the Raiden Shogun. Afterwards, he issued multiple public declarations of revenge, all of which Sara rejected. Even after the decree was abolished, Itto still challenged Kujou Sara to a duel. In the first act of his story quest, Itto discovers that descendants of the Blue Oni clan are committing robbery and kidnapping in Inazuma City. He publicly takes responsibility for their crimes while secretly investigating. After finding one such descendant, Takuya, he follows him to his hideout and frees the hostages. Itto persuades Takuya not to forget the pride of the oni nor to give up his life. In the end, both are arrested.

=== Gameplay ===
Arataki Itto is a five-star Geo character who wields a claymore. His Elemental Skill summons "Ushi", a small red bull and honorary member of the Arataki Gang, which he can throw at enemies. His Elemental Burst puts him into an empowered state known as "Raging Oni King" and transforms his weapon into the "Oni King's Kanabou." Itto has a high base critical hit rate, can "taunt" to draw enemy fire, and deals considerable damage while in the "Raging Oni King" state.

In a limited-time event in version 3.4, players could take part in a beetle-fighting tournament organized by Itto, where victory is determined through the special "Beetle Battle" gameplay mechanic.

== Promotion ==
miHoYo first announced Arataki Itto as a new playable character by releasing his official artwork on October 11, 2021. During the promotional livestream for version 2.3 of the game, miHoYo revealed Arataki Itto's voice actor and gameplay; on December 8, they released his character trailer. On December 12, they released a preview demonstration of his combat gameplay. miHoYo also prepared a signature weapon for him to use.

== Reception ==
=== Appearance ===
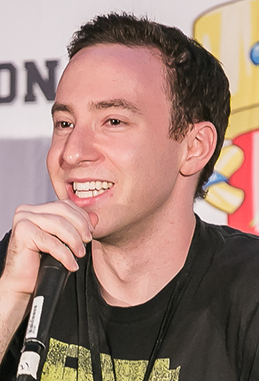
Arataki Itto is voiced in English by Max Mittelman.

Tilly Lawton, an editor at Pocket Tactics, praised Arataki Itto's design as captivating for players. As the silly-yet-lovable leader of the Arataki Gang and a descendant of Inazuma's oni bloodline on the brink of extinction, Itto (one of the game's tallest characters) boasts a wild mane, fangs, oni horns, and washboard abs. Game Rant's Nahda Nabiilah wrote that his appearance inherited traits of Japanese yōkai, including red horns, long white hair with red streaks flowing down his back, sharply defined abs, a Vision hanging from a spiked choker around his neck, and an oni mask on his hip, all of which combine to create an "awe-inspiring atmosphere".

Polygon's Ana Diaz, however, criticized the mismatch between Itto's slender arms and his well-defined abs and massive club. Later, when miHoYo introduced the new character Alhaitham and several new NPCs upon the release of Sumeru in version 3.0, their arm musculature was noticeably more detailed, which Diaz said made Itto's design seem all the more disappointing in retrospect.

=== Character design and voice acting ===
Siliconera editor Jenni Lada praised Arataki Itto's Story Quest "The Golden Soul" as one of the best-written side quests in the game. At the beginning of the quest, players learn through an Adventurers' Guild commission that Itto is a fugitive, and must gather information about his whereabouts from locals. This narrative approach was described as very effective, guiding players to piece together his profile from fragments of dialogue while also providing opportunities to naturally introduce local folklore.

Diaz praised Arataki Itto's performance in the version 2.6 event quest "Hues of the Violet Garden". She highlighted how Mittelman's improvisation in the English dub brought the character vividly to life. At first, Itto shows little interest in volunteering for the Inazuma festival, but once he learns that a limited-edition cocktail is for sale, he suddenly changes his tune before asking for more details about how to obtain it. After finally winning the cocktail, Itto realizes that it contains beans, triggering his allergy and leaving him doubled over with stomach pain. Diaz described this as a comedic performance that made the entire scene memorable.

=== Gameplay ===
Pocket Tactics, Game Rant, PC Gamer, and Yahoo News all praised Arataki Itto's combat capabilities, writing that he performs well against both bosses and regular enemies. Game Rant's Hajrudin Kerdjic wrote that Itto's Elemental Burst shares similarities with Razor's playstyle: his empowered state disappears once he leaves the field, so players need to activate all their buffs before using it. According to Yahoo News' Yan Ku, Itto's normal attacks and skill can both build up stacks of bonuses, meaning he does not consume stamina and is less likely to be interrupted in combat. Compared to other Geo characters, Arataki Itto's playstyle is simpler and more straightforward.

=== Cultural impact ===
Arataki Itto has been warmly received by players. After miHoYo released his official character artwork, fans immediately began discussing and comparing him to other characters such as Zhongli. On Twitter, his artwork was retweeted over 100,000 times within several hours and by the end of the day, retweets exceeded 160,000 and likes surpassed 370,000. Kotaku's Sisi Jiang said that compared to the many "pretty boy" character previously released in Genshin Impact, more muscular anime-style characters such as Itto are rare and highly anticipated by players. Fans compared him to strong characters such as Kyojuro Rengoku from Demon Slayer: Kimetsu no Yaiba and Ibaraki-dōji from the mobile game Onmyōji.

According to PCGamesN and Game Rant, the character banner featuring the Wanderer and Arataki Itto generated over US$3.79 million in revenue on its first day of release and more than US$17.43 million in its first week. (Note: In Genshin Impact and other gacha games, a banner is the game's limited-time gacha event where players spend in-game currency (and sometimes real-world money) for the chance to get certain exclusive characters and weapons. For most characters, it is impossible to get them outside of their banners.) However, Itto's share of the revenue was estimated to only be about 8%. Players also expressed their fondness for Itto through cosplay, fan art, and fan videos. Game Rant reported that a Malaysian restaurant even offered free meals to customers who owned Arataki Itto in Genshin Impact; all they had to do was show the in-game character screen when ordering their meal.

Because the weapon depicted in Itto's character artwork, the "Oni King's Kanabou", resembles a chocolate-covered ice cream bar, fans edited the artwork to replace the club with ice cream, creating an internet meme. Later in December 2021, the Chinese ice cream brand Suibian announced a collaboration with Genshin Impact, releasing a co-branded chocolate-covered ice cream bar inspired by the meme.
