= Wanderer (Genshin Impact) =

Fictional character in a video game

- Genshin Impact character
- The Wanderer in Genshin Impact
- First game: Genshin Impact (2020)
- Voiced by: EN: Patrick Pedraza; ZH: Lu Yin; JA: Tetsuya Kakihara; KO: Min Seung-woo

In-universe information
- Aliases: Hat Guy; Kabukimono (formerly); Scaramouche (formerly); The Balladeer (formerly)
- Species: Puppet
- Affiliation: Vahumana, Sumeru Akademiya; Fatui (formerly)
- Weapon: Catalyst
- Family: Raiden Shogun (creator); Nahida (caretaker)
- Origin: Inazuma
- Element: Anemo

The Wanderer (Note: Chinese: 流浪者; pinyin: Liúlàngzhě) is a character from the video game Genshin Impact, developed by miHoYo. He first appeared in Version 1.1 of the game in 2020 and became a playable character in Version 3.3 in 2022, along with a boss version of him. He is a sentient puppet created by Raiden Ei, the fictional ruler of the nation of Inazuma. He named himself Kunikuzushi, (Note: Chinese: 国崩; pinyin: Guóbēng; lit. 'national collapse') later joined the antagonist organization the Fatui, and was further named Scaramouche. (Note: Chinese: 斯卡拉姆齐; pinyin: Sīkǎlāmǔqí) and codenamed The Balladeer (Note: Chinese: 散兵; pinyin: Sǎnbīng; lit. 'skirmisher') In the boss fight, he is given the title Everlasting Lord of Arcane Wisdom. (Note: Chinese: 七叶寂照秘密主; pinyin: Qīyè Jìzhào Mìmì-zhǔ; lit. 'Everlasting Omniscient Lord of Wisdom and Mercy') He appears as a villain during the Inazuma arc of the game's storyline, but reforms during the subsequent arc set in Sumeru and becomes a ward of the Dendro Archon, Nahida.

The Wanderer's name draws from stock characters in kabuki theatre and Italian commedia dell'arte, and his concept takes inspiration from the Japanese deity Takeminakata as well as the Queen song "Bohemian Rhapsody". Critics have expressed mixed opinions about his design and narrative portrayal. While his tragic past was seen as sympathetic, his turn toward the protagonists in the story drew criticism and controversy among some players. His gameplay and combat capabilities received positive evaluations from reviewers.

== Design and voice acting ==
=== Character design ===
In his early appearances as an antagonist, the character was portrayed as a sharp-tongued and ruthless high-ranking Fatui Harbinger. The Fatui are one of the game's main antagonist factions. His early name, "Kunikuzushi", comes from a villainous character archetype in kabuki theatre, referring to someone who seeks to overthrow a nation through manipulation and deceit. The name bestowed upon him by the Tsaritsa of Snezhnaya, "Scaramouche", is taken from the stock character Scaramouche (Italian: Scaramuccia) in Italian commedia dell'arte. Interestingly, here the French version of the word Scaramouche is used as his name, not the Italian; all of the other Fatui Harbingers' titles use Italian such as Arlecchino. The Wanderer's Anemo-themed design is thought to draw inspiration from the Japanese deity Takeminakata who, like the deity Takemikazuchi, was born from the corpse of the creator goddess Izanami in traditional Japanese mythology. The Queen song "Bohemian Rhapsody" has also been cited as an influence on the character's narrative; the title of his gameplay preview trailer, "Any Way the Wind Blows", references the lyric "Any way the wind blows doesn't really matter to me." His debut OST, "Ominous Fandango", pays homage to another lyric from the song: "Scaramouche, Scaramouche, will you do the fandango?"

=== Voice acting ===
The Wanderer is voiced in Chinese by Lu Yin, who also provides the voice for the male Traveler, Aether. His Japanese voice actor is Tetsuya Kakihara. In interviews, Kakihara described The Balladeer as a "hateful brat" type of character. He initially felt uneasy about voicing such an arrogant and overbearing figure, but in the end the character was beloved by many players, putting him at ease. Kakihara also revealed that when he first recorded the character for the in-game event "Unreconciled Stars" in version 1.1, the script described him as only a "mysterious young man" with the codename "Balladeer" and that he did not yet know that the character's true name was Scaramouche. Because the word "balladeer" (Japanese: 散兵, romanized: sanbō) literally translates to "soldier" in Japanese, he originally assumed it referred to an ordinary foot soldier; it was only after speaking with the development team that he learned of the character's power and importance. The Wanderer is voiced in English by Patrick Pedraza and in Korean by Min Seung-woo.

== Appearances ==
=== Story ===
The Wanderer is a puppet created by Raiden Ei, the ruler and Archon of Inazuma. When he was born, Raiden Ei regarded him as a failed attempt at creating a puppet body due to his overly fragile and gentle disposition. She sealed his powers and abandoned him in a region called Tatarasuna in Inazuma. One day, a man named Katsuragi accidentally wandered into the chamber and brought him into human society. Seeing that the Wanderer was unwilling to explain his origins, Katsuragi gave him the fabricated identity of an amnesiac who had lost his way. Before long, he integrated into the local community and even learned swordsmithing from Niwa Hisahide, a renowned bladesmith. Because of his elegant clothing, the villagers nicknamed him "Kabukimono". Later the Fatui Harbinger "Il Dottore" arrived in Tatarasuna disguised as a technician from Fontaine and built a large furnace there. The furnace soon malfunctioned, releasing poisonous gas into the area. The Wanderer chose to use his identity to seek help from the Raiden Shogun, but she refused to meet him; only her close friend and confidante Yae Miko offered her assistance. He then returned to Tatarasuna and personally shut down the furnace using a purification device provided to him by Il Dottore. The latter then murdered Niwa and then falsely claimed that Niwa had fled, ordering the Wanderer to carry out the dangerous task of shutting down the furnace. Feeling betrayed by this, the Wanderer renamed himself "Kunikuzushi" (国崩), left Inazuma, and grew to hate both the Raiden Shogun and the swordsmiths of Tatarasuna. The Fatui took the opportunity to recruit him into their ranks, giving him the name "Scaramouche" and the codename "The Balladeer". Driven by revenge, he almost killed all of the surviving heirs of Inazuma's five great swordsmithing schools, and later took part in an operation to seize the Raiden Shogun's Gnosis, the symbol of her divine authority.

To prove to the Raiden Shogun that he was not a failed creation, the Wanderer also allowed the Doctor to modify him so he could use the Gnosis and become a god known as the "Shouki no Kami" (Japanese: 正機の神, lit. 'God of Righteousness'). He aimed to replace Nahida as an Archon. After being defeated by the protagonist Traveler, he was discarded by the Fatui. Because he had temporarily become a god and retained some level of divine authority, Nahida struck a deal with him: in exchange for her protection, he would enter Irminsul — the world's tree and its information repository — to help her search for more knowledge. The Traveler accompanied them so they could monitor the Wanderer. During this journey, the group learned that Niwa and the others had not actually betrayed the Wanderer at Tatarasuna. Realizing that altering information within Irminsul would also change reality, he completed the task Nahida had given him and then erased all records of his own existence in order to save Niwa and the others, attempting to atone for his past actions. Because of this, everyone in Teyvat except for the Traveler and including Nahida, forgot entirely about Scaramouche's existence. As an outlander, the Traveler was never a part of Irminsul and thus remembered the Wanderer's past, although the rewritten history contained no trace of them. The Traveler informed Nahida about what happened. Although she had forgotten him due to herself being a part of Irminsul, she had anticipated his decision beforehand and preserved his memories in an encrypted form as a fairy-tale. Nahida concluded that the Wanderer must still exist, and soon after, the Traveler encountered him again in Sumeru. He had been wandering aimlessly, yet he calmly accepted the Traveler's explanation of events and came to terms with his past. His memories are restored, after which the Traveler is asked to pick a new name for him. He later appears in the Archon Quest for the region known as Nod-Krai, helping in an effort to rescue Columbina from the Fatui. He also aided Durin and Albedo in the same Archon Quest, helping them change the fate of a few illusional ghosts of the past.

=== Gameplay ===
The Wanderer is an Anemo catalyst user. His Elemental Skill, one of the game's main ways of attacking enemies, causes him to soar into the air and fly while unleashing elemental attacks. His Elemental Burst has him compressing the atmosphere into a singular vacuum that deals multiple instances of AoE Anemo damage.

He is the only playable character apart from the Traveler and the Manekin/Manekina whose name can be changed by the player at will. At the end of the aforementioned story arc, players are prompted to give him a new name (which can even be identical to that of the Traveler). However, he will reject names related to his former identities such as "Scaramouche" or "Balladeer" along with the names of his former Fatui colleagues or any names already used by other playable characters. Inappropriate names will be rejected by the system, requiring the player to enter a different one. Players can choose to rename the Wanderer only once, using an item called "An Appellative Stroke". Additionally, players who chose a name that is slated to be given to a future Genshin Impact character are required to rename him, even if the name was allowed at the time it was chosen. If this is the case, the game will notify the player of this and give them an extra copy of "An Appellative Stroke". If the Wanderer appears in a quest with voiced dialogue, characters will generally refer to him as "Hat Guy", in reference to the big hat he wears.

Scaramouche was added as a weekly boss fight in version 3.2 of the game under the name "Everlasting Lord of Arcane Wisdom".

== Promotion ==
The Wanderer first appeared in November 2020 as a non-playable character during a limited-time event in version 1.1 of the game entitled "Unreconciled Stars". At the time, he was a high-ranking member, or Harbinger, of the Fatui. He was given the codename "The Balladeer" by the Fatui, and was given the name Scaramouche as well. A story teaser entitled "The 'Divine' Will" was released on October 4, 2022. On October 31, 2022, the anniversary of the release of "Bohemian Rhapsody", HoYoverse released the character artwork for "The Wanderer". Although some parts of his physical appearance were identical to that of The Balladeer, his color palette and clothing differed significantly, and the presence of an Anemo Vision on his sash hinted at major future changes in his narrative. On December 4, HoYoverse published his character teaser, entitled "Ashes", which showcased parts of his experiences in Inazuma. On December 5, following the release of version 3.3 of the game, the Wanderer became a playable character, along with the release of his signature weapon, "Tulaytullah's Remembrance".

== Reception ==
After the Wanderer first appeared in the game as a charismatic villain, he quickly attracted a devoted fanbase among players. In an interview in 2021, Kakihara mentioned that after HoYoverse received feedback from players about the Wanderer's popularity, they intentionally increased the number of his voice lines in the Inazuma storyline. Fans expressed their fondness for the character through cosplay as well as fan art and fan-made videos. Within days, the Wanderer surpassed Yae Miko to become the most-retweeted post on Genshin Impact's Japanese Twitter account; the English account's tweet also broke its previous like record, exceeding 382,000 likes. According to PCGamesN and Game Rant, the 2022 character banner featuring the Wanderer and Arataki Itto generated over US$3.79 million in revenue on its first day of release and more than US$17.43 million in its first week. (Note: In Genshin Impact and other gacha games, a banner is the game's limited-time gacha event where players spend in-game currency (and sometimes real-world money) for the chance to get certain exclusive characters and weapons. For most characters, it is impossible to get them outside of their banners.) The Wanderer's share of that banner's revenue was around 92%.

=== Design and characterization ===
The Wanderer's outfit when he went by the name of Scaramouche/The Balladeer

Critics offered mixed opinions on the Wanderer's visual design. Kotaku editor Sisi Jiang described his clothing (a coat paired with shorts) and bowl-cut hairstyle as awkward. Polygon writer Ana Diaz said she thought the Wanderer's design was fresh, and remarked that he seemed "friendlier and softer" than he did as Scaramouche. She described Scaramouche as a "ruthless super-villain with an edgy design." In addition, IGN India reported that some players were displeased with HoYoverse's redesign of his outfit. Lin Zhuoheng of HK01 wrote that the Wanderer's youthful appearance, mischievous persona, and Tetsuya Kakihara's portrayal made him extremely popular among certain players; the game's extensive lore, he added, also strengthened the character's overall portrayal.

Reception of his role in the story was similarly mixed. Most criticism focused on his early appearances as a villain. Sisi Jiang expressed a strong dislike toward his initial portrayal, arguing that his snide and abrasive personality made him unpleasant, and that his crimes left little room for sympathy. However, later revelations about his tragic past received positive responses. Jiang said that her heart was "crushed [...] into itty-bitty pieces" by these later developments. Blade Moore of Game Rant compared his story to that of Furina, adding that both of them wanted to be human and free of their responsibilities, but were denied these opportunities by their circumstances at one point. Furina was loved by her creator Focalors, while the Wanderer was discarded by the Raiden Shogun. In the end, Furina got to live her ideal life as a human while the Wanderer was "too hurt to realize his freedom." Jenni Lada of Siliconera also expressed sympathy for the character, calling his story satisfying; Lada commended Genshin Impact for their storytelling of the Wanderer's growth arc from emotional ruin to him rediscovering hope, and Ana Diaz said she believed that the Wanderer's complicated story was a key factor in his popularity among players. In contrast, Lin criticized the later storyline as a "forced redemption".

According to Prima Games, some Chinese players who disliked the Wanderer organized protest campaigns demanding that HoYoverse remove him from the game, and mocked or discriminated against players who owned or liked the character. There were even online claims of people abusing black cats due to their hatred of the Wanderer. This stems from a plot point in which Nahida metaphorically compares him to a black cat.

Regarding the gameplay segment in which players choose a new name for the Wanderer at the end of his storyline, Jiang described it as a rare and memorable experience. Many players, she said, discussed naming him on Internet forums with the earnestness of parents choosing a name for their child, with some even researching the meanings of certain Japanese names. Jiang wrote that "names are new beginnings" and that this mechanic fosters an emotional bond between players and the character, allowing them to express hopes for his future and his life of atonement through the name they give him. Keiichi Yokoyama of Automaton commented that some of the names he had seen players give him were weird, noting names such as "Emergency Food 2" (a reference to the game's mascot, Paimon), "Chiikawa" (after the manga of the same name) and "Doppo Orochi" (a reference to the manga series Baki the Grappler). He added that he had seen some English-speaking players name him things such as "Shrek".
