= Mavuika =

Fictional character in a video game

- Genshin Impact character
- Promotional artwork of Mavuika riding her motorcycle
- First game: Genshin Impact (2024)
- Voiced by: EN: Katiana Sarkissian; ZH: Li Ye; JA: Mikako Komatsu; KO: Kim Na-yul

In-universe information
- Alias: Haborym
- Weapon: Claymore
- Home: Natlan
- Element: Pyro

Mavuika (/ˌmaʊˈwiːkə/ mow-WEE-kə; Chinese: 玛薇卡; pinyin: Mǎwēikǎ) is a character from Genshin Impact, a 2020 action role-playing gacha game developed by miHoYo. The character first appeared in the game's Version 5.0 update and became playable in January 2025.

In the game's story, Mavuika was originally a commoner from the fictional nation of Natlan. Five hundred years prior to the game's events, she won the role of Pyro Archon in a tournament and thus became Natlan's ruler. She led Natlan's tribes in resisting an invasion which decimated the continent of Teyvat. However, during the process she was forced to sacrifice herself by drawing on the power of death to quell the invasion, postponing the war until she was revived five hundred years later. With the help of the protagonist Traveler and allies, she led Natlan to victory against the Abyss.

Mavuika's skin tone has been criticized, and her depiction ingame as a motorcycle rider got mixed responses. As a character that embodies both humanity and divinity, (Note: Despite being human, she has the title "God of War" and is one of The Seven. The Seven are the group of gods who preside over the regions of Teyvat, each of whom is associated with a particular ideal and element (in Mavuika's case, these would be war and fire, respectively).) her portrayal in the story has been well received by critics and fans. Her combat playstyle also drew widespread praise: she can serve as both a main damage dealer (DPS) and a support attacker, and her considerable strength has also been praised.

== Voice acting ==
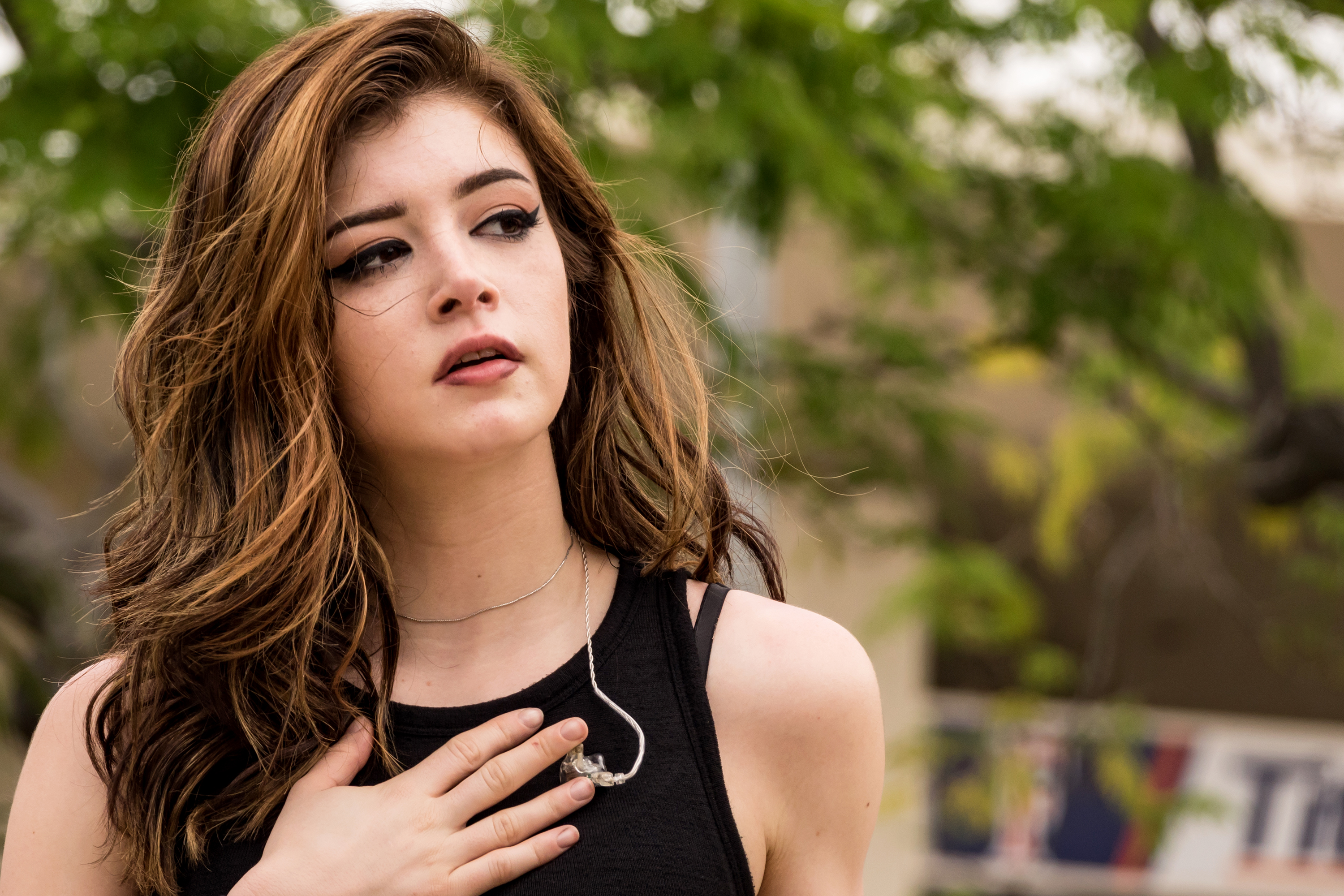
Chrissy Costanza, pictured, sung the English version of Mavuika's promotional song, "Blazing Heart"

Mavuika's Japanese voice actress is Mikako Komatsu. In an interview with Weekly Famitsu, Komatsu revealed that during her first recording session, the production team did not immediately have her perform official lines, but instead tested her acting direction through trial recordings of a few lines to fine-tune the character's image—a process she noted was quite rare in voice acting. Throughout recording, she referred to the character's artwork and design notes while discussing with staff and experimenting with her delivery, gradually shaping the character's image. Since Genshin Impact records voice lines progressively with the storyline, Komatsu adjusted her performance as the narrative developed; she highlighted that although Mavuika's youthful, dignified vocal tone did not fundamentally change, as the story advanced she deliberately added a sense of maturity to reflect the burdens the character carried over the years. Mavuika's Chinese, English and Korean voice actresses are Li Ye, Katiana Sarkissian, and Kim Na-yul, respectively. Sarkissian was nominated for Best Voice Acting in a Mobile Game in 2025 at the GamingonPhone Awards for her performance as Mavuika.

== Appearances ==
Mavuika was originally an ordinary human from Natlan. Five hundred years prior to the game's events, she won the seat of Pyro Archon (Natlan's head of state) via a victory at a warriors' tournament, taking the Gnostic name "Haborym". When the Abyss (one of the main antagonist groups in the game) swept through Teyvat, they invaded Natlan's Night Kingdom, the mystical location governing the cycle of life and death for the Natlanese. Mavuika led Natlan's people in a fierce struggle against the Abyss, eventually driving the Abyss from the surface of Teyvat. However, the Abyss still relentlessly invaded the Night Kingdom, a threat that demanded the strength of all of Natlan to repel, and it became necessary for Mavuika to utilize the power of the divine throne of Pyro Archon to conquer it. After long years of war, the people of Natlan were exhausted and weak, unable to sustain another campaign against the Abyss. After discussing it with representatives of Natlan's different tribes, Mavuika decided to postpone the war for 500 years, giving the tribes and Natlan time to heal, grow, and train, as well as to cultivate the power to resist the Abyss. This included six heroes, one from each tribe, who could stand on their own and provide key assistance when the time came. To make this possible, she drew on the power of the Ruler of Death to sacrifice herself and, when the tribes were ready, she would be resurrected and lead the war against the Abyss once more.

At the beginning of the Natlan portion of the game's storyline, Mavuika has been resurrected. The Traveler, the game's protagonist, arrives in Natlan and meets many of its inhabitants, including a young timid warrior named Kachina, who gets lost during a mission to the Night Kingdom. Mavuika tries to use a ritual known as the Ode of Resurrection to bring her back, but fails to do so, realizing the severity of the Abyssal incursion into the Night Kingdom. After Kachina is rescued by the Traveler, Mavuika rallies them and their allies to unite and fight the Abyss with the goal of gathering the six aforementioned heroes. This eventually leads to a successful resistance against the Abyss. The Abyss takes the opportunity to launch another full-scale war against Natlan, whose tribes suffer heavy casualties. However, with the cooperation of the Traveler and their allies, the six heroes gather together and successfully resist the invasion once again. Mavuika and the Traveler defeat the Abyss in a decisive battle and eventually completely annihilate the threat. Later, the Traveler and Nahida approach Natlan from the neighboring nation of Sumeru, asking for Mavuika's help in combating the corruption of Irminsul, Teyvat's world tree. Mavuika, unable to cross over into Sumeru herself due to a magical barrier cutting Sumeru off from the rest of Teyvat, offers the two of them her Gnosis, which they use to burn Irminsul. She then joins all of Teyvat in protecting the world against the Nails of Retribution. (Note: The Nails of Retribution are giant nails hanging in the sky, created by Celestia, to combat deviations from a divine plan made by the Heavenly Principles, Teyvat's ruler.)

== Promotion ==
Mavuika first appeared in the story trailer "A Name Forged in Flames", which focused on the fictional nation of Natlan. The trailer also announced her voice actor and character design. She later appeared as a non-player character in the game's main storyline with the release of version 5.0. miHoYo unveiled her character illustration on November 24, 2024, confirming that she would become a playable character in the future. The next month, miHoYo released Mavuika's promotional video "Mavuika: A Light Through Time". They also produced a music video, "Blazing Heart", which showed her combat capabilities. The song was released in Chinese, Japanese, English and Korean versions. The English version was performed by American singer Chrissy Costanza, the lead singer of Against the Current. The Korean version is sung by Miyeon of the K-pop group i-dle. The Chinese and Japanese versions are sung by singer Tia Ray and the character's Japanese voice actress, Mikako Komatsu, respectively.

Mavuika officially became a playable character with the release of version 5.3 on January 1, 2025. Offline, the company held themed pop-up events titled "Stand with Mavuika" in several countries, featuring game demos, lotteries, and merchandise sales. At one event in Taiwan, a custom-painted motorcycle themed around Mavuika was publicly displayed for the first time. Chinese influencer Mi Fei cosplayed Mavuika at one of the events in Taipei, interacting with attendees and taking photos with them.

Prior to her release as a playable character, her combat animations were leaked by someone with the online username Dim. The footage, which was deleted later, showed Mavuika using her claymore to defeat enemies and also showcased the two forms of her Elemental Skill. Bruno Yonezawa of Screen Rant described her animations as "very elegant and skillful" in terms of perceived combat prowess, adding that they go hand-in-hand with her background as a warrior. The footage reminded Yonezawa of his prior obsession with Xiao and made him think of Mavuika as "an absolute must-have character". He further described her as having "one of the most broken mounts among the Natlan character roster", referring to her ability to use her motorcycle to traverse different types of terrain.

Mavuika was added as a playable character in version 5.3. miHoYo opened limited-time pop-up stores called "Stand with Mavuika" that sold limited-edition merchandise. Due to the limited quantity of merchandise, many players lined up before the store's opening. Some players also expressed their love for the character through role-playing and cosplay.

== Critical reception ==
After miHoYo released the initial trailer for Natlan, some players were dissatisfied with the characters' pale skin. Kenneth Shepard of Kotaku and Michael Cripe of IGN speculated that Mavuika was inspired by Māori mythology. The community wanted characters based on dark-skinned people to have dark skin themselves; they saw Mavuika's skin as too pale. Some of the game's English voice actors also expressed dissatisfaction with this, as Mavuika was not the only character this happened to. Polygon's Ana Diaz expressed approval for Mavuika's color scheme, and compared her to the My Little Pony character Sunset Shimmer since they share a similar color scheme.

After Natlan and its related storyline were implemented, Mavuika's motorcycle sparked debate and received mixed reactions. Gai Zi of Game Base praised the motorcycle as a cultural expression that combined Natlan's technology and tradition. Gabriela Jessica of The Nerd Stash criticized Mavuika having a motorcycle as inappropriate for her divine role, remarking that at first glance she "thought [Mavuika] was actually a tourist". Jessica argued that the motorcycle was too modern and overly realistic, whereas the machinery in Fontaine felt more in-line with a fantasy setting. Both Jessica and Holly Alice of Pocket Tactics compared Mavuika's clothing design to those of characters from other games, such as Wuthering Waves and miHoYo's Zenless Zone Zero. Alice wrote "love the vibe, but save it for ZZZ's Burnice." Writer Holly Alice of Pocket Tactics also indicated that Mavuika resembled the character Murata Himeko from Honkai Impact 3rd, another game developed by miHoYo, in reference to one of Mavuika's predecessors who was called Murata. She wrote that Mavuika resembled one of Himeko's battlesuits.

Natlan's main storyline began with version 5.0 of the game, and continued through version 5.3. Prior to the 5.3 update players were highly anticipating the Traveler fighting alongside Mavuika, with many actively discussing future developments. In her analysis, Gabriela Jessica compared Mavuika's character arc to that of her Fontainian counterpart Furina, saying that Mavuika's depiction in the main storyline was too steady. She criticized miHoYo for relegating too much of her character arc to online animated shorts like "Sunset" (in which Mavuika's backstory was explored), rather than fully presenting it within the game. Jisumarokku, a reviewer for Japanese gaming site Denfaminico Gamer, wrote that Mavuika's story was shown from different angles in the main storyline and in her personal Story Quest. In the main story, her family was only briefly referenced, while in her personal quest, her dual identities as a god and as a human were explored more in-depth. In particular, the story of her sister Hine highlighted Mavuika's human side; Jisumarokku argued that though Hine was an ordinary person, her love and devotion toward her sister Mavuika, and the meaningful simplicity of her life, made the quest emotionally moving. Jisumarokku went on to argue that the Story Quest presented Mavuika as not only a national leader and deity but also "everyone's hero," and that the story was as emotionally powerful as that of Sumeru, and was the most moving plotline they had experienced in the game since Sumeru.

Mavuika's combat gameplay has received generally positive reviews. She can be used as both a primary (on-field) and secondary (off-field) attack unit, and similar to the Raiden Shogun, she can cause a lot of damage even when not on the field. However, several media outlets have said her design leans toward either that of an on-field DPS, or that she can function as either an on-field DPS or off-field sub-DPS. Bruno Yonezawa of Screen Rant said that her build makes her a versatile character when forming a party; Leclair also praised Mavuika as an offensive support who can replace other Pyro support characters such as Xiangling. Yahoo News believes that Mavuika is very powerful and easy to use. VG247 reviewer Josh Broadwell also wrote that Mavuika is easy to build and does not require a lot to perform well. The Nerd Stash reviewer Gabriela Jessica believes that Mavuika relies on being in a party with other Natlan characters, and is thus not as versatile as other previously-released characters. Other Archons, she writes, are "pretty universal and flexible" in combat compared to her. Jessica criticized the motorcycle's centrality to Mavuika's combat style, writing that it made her think the character felt out of place in Genshin Impact. Jessica went further on to say that although Mavuika can still use a claymore, that would be more suitable for a character in a sub-DPS role.
