= Nahida (Genshin Impact) =

Fictional character in a video game

- Genshin Impact character
- Nahida in Genshin Impact
- First game: Genshin Impact (2022)
- Voiced by: EN: Kimberley Anne Campbell; ZH: Hua Ling; JA: Yukari Tamura; KO: Park Shi-yoon

In-universe information
- Aliases: Lesser Lord Kusanali, Buer
- Species: Not human (Note: Greater Lord Rukkhadevata says that she (Rukkhadevata) is an avatar of Irminsul, Teyvat's world tree, and that Nahida is the "purest branch" of Irminsul. It is not explicitly stated whether this means that Nahida is the same species as Rukkhadevata, or even a reincarnation of her; however, her long lifespan (500 years) and pointy ears indicate that she is not human.)
- Weapon: Catalyst
- Family: The Wanderer (adopted)
- Home: Sumeru
- Element: Dendro

Nahida (/nəˈhiːdə/ nə-HEE-də; Chinese: 纳西妲; pinyin: Nàxīdá) is a character in the video game Genshin Impact, developed by miHoYo. She was introduced in version 3.0 of the game in 2022, and was released as a playable character later that year. In the game, she is the ruler of the fictional nation of Sumeru and one of the gods who govern the game's seven nations. She is known as the Dendro Archon Buer (BOO-er, 布耶尔; Bùyé'ěr) and is respectfully referred to by Sumeru's people by the title Lesser Lord Kusanali (ku-sa-NA-li, 小吉祥草王; Xiǎo Jíxiángcǎo Wáng; 'Little Lucky-Grass Monarch'). Nahida's character design draws inspiration from Persian mythology, and her personality has a childlike quality. Her experiences within the game's story have made players feel sympathetic toward her, and most commentators have praised her characterization. Her gameplay abilities and combat performance have also received positive evaluations from critics.

== Design and voice acting ==
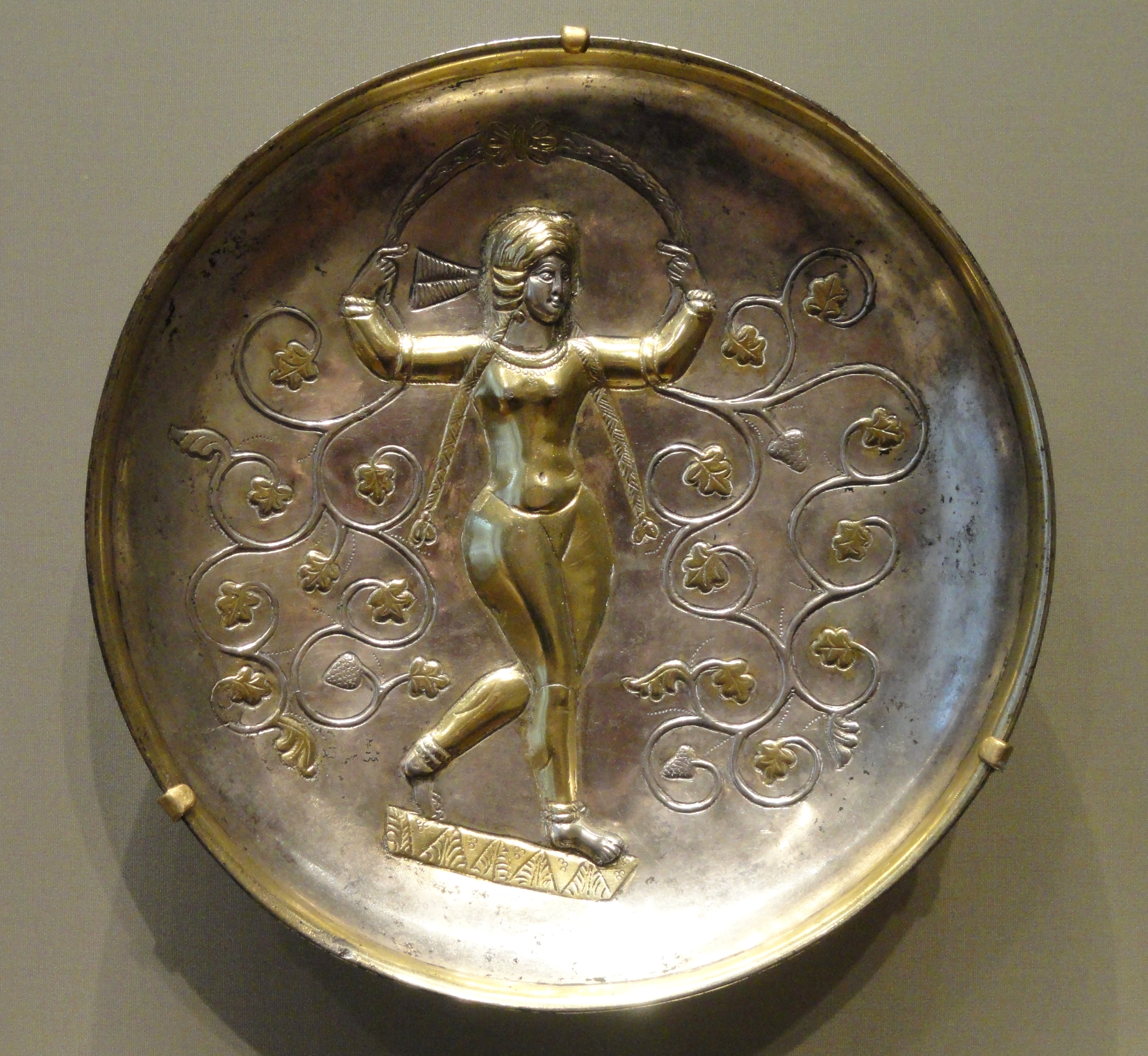
Nahida is named after the Persian goddess Anahita, depicted in this gilded silver bowl dated 400–600 AD.

In the game's lore, Nahida is the youngest among the seven Archons in the game, succeeding the previous Dendro Archon, Greater Lord Rukkhadevata (roo-ka-de-VAH-ta, 大慈树王; Dàcí Shù Wáng; 'Great Benevolent Tree Lord'). Nominally she is the ruler of Sumeru, but in reality she has long remained secluded within a sanctuary in Sumeru City and is effectively sidelined by the Akademiya, Sumeru's governing body. Her character design draws inspiration from Persian mythology, and her name is derived from the modern Persian pronunciation of Anahita, the Iranian goddess of fertility, healing and wisdom. In terms of animation design, Nahida has unique footstep sound effects, while her movements such as jumping and rolling are consistent with those of other small female playable characters. In her idle animation, she sits on a floating swing made of Dendro (plant) energy, highlighting her childlike nature. Shortly after her release, a bug was discovered: while in her idle animation, she could be pushed by other characters and would continue moving with sustained momentum. This glitch allowed players to bypass terrain limitations and traverse across the map, and the developers planned to fix it in a future update. Regarding her abilities, miHoYo designed a skill similar to telepathy, which allows players to hear the inner thoughts of all named NPCs in Sumeru. This is the first ability in the game that directly affects NPCs, and it also ties into "Lesser Lord Kusanali"'s lore.

Nahida is voiced in English by Kimberley Anne Campbell, in Chinese by Hua Ling, and in Korean by Park Shi-yoon. Her Japanese voice is provided by Yukari Tamura, who also voices the character Qiqi, making Tamura the first voice actress in the game's Japanese dub to voice two playable characters. Campbell revealed that she was cast under extreme secrecy. The audition email she received used a fake game title and code name, and the character name was kept from her, simply described as a deity who appeared around eight years old but possessed wisdom and age far beyond her appearance. After three weeks of silence following her audition, she had already given up hope — until she suddenly received a booking notification, still unaware of what the actual project was. Only after hearing one of miHoYo's engineers casually mention the words "Genshin" and later, "Kusanali", did she discover with shock and honor that she was playing none other than the Dendro Archon. Campbell feels she shares quite a few similarities with Nahida, particularly enjoying extended periods of solitude and not being particularly keen on going outside, which resonated with Nahida's long isolation. The only difference, she notes, is that Nahida yearns to explore the outside world, while she herself happily works from home and relishes her alone time.

== Appearances ==
Greater Lord Rukkhadevata

Nahida is a central character in the Sumeru arc of the main storyline of Genshin Impact. She is the youngest among the Seven Archons in the game, bearing the Goetic name "Buer". Sumeru's former deity, Greater Lord Rukkhadevata, enjoyed immense prestige. She established the Sumeru Akademiya to help govern Sumeru and created a system known as the Akasha, which allowed knowledge to be transmitted and received via dreams. After Greater Lord Rukkhadevata's death, the Akademiya's sages found her successor, Nahida, and named her Lesser Lord Kusanali. Although Nahida possesses divine authority, she lacks her predecessor's wisdom to resolve the problems of Irminsul, Teyvat's world tree, which stem from when an ancient god known as King Deshret introduced forbidden knowledge into Teyvat. As a result, she is looked down upon by the sages, who pride themselves on wisdom. They confine her to the Sanctuary of Surasthana (built by Rukkhadevata) and force her to maintain the Akasha system while deliberately diminishing her public presence. Faced with the sages' distrust, Nahida begins learning through the Akasha system in hopes of becoming a worthy deity, while secretly helping the people of Sumeru within her limited power by using it as a medium. Five hundred years later, the sages, under the influence of the Fatui Harbinger Il Dottore, decide to collaborate with him, using the Electro Gnosis obtained from Inazuma to turn the Wanderer (then named Scaramouche) into a new god to replace Nahida. To accelerate this plan, the sages harvest the dreams of Sumeru's people via the Akasha system, trapping them in an endless dream loop known as a samsara. The Traveler meets Nahida under the belief that she will be able to assist them in locating their lost sibling due to her being the goddess of wisdom. They consult the Akasha for information on her whereabouts, but come up empty. The Traveler is also caught in the samsara, but due to their unique constitution quickly senses something is wrong. With Nahida's help, the Traveler breaks the samsara.

The two then begin to work together to investigate the sages' plan to turn Scaramouche into a god, but their efforts are stopped by Dottore's intervention. Nahida loses control of the Akasha, completely cutting off her connection to the outside world, and she is imprisoned. Following Nahida's earlier advice, the Traveler travels to the western desert area of Sumeru to seek allies, forming a rescue team with characters such as Cyno, the leader of the Akademiya's disciplinary squadron, Alhaitham, a scholar, and Dehya, a mercenary. They ultimately succeed in rescuing Nahida, and with her assistance the Traveler defeats the now-deified Scaramouche. After Scaramouche's defeat, Nahida decided to hide him and eventually care for him while he recovered from the battle. She reached an agreement with him where he ceased to be a Fatui Harbinger and remained in Sumeru under her care; she allows him to become a student there. After obtaining two Gnoses, symbols of divine authority, Nahida finally gains the ability to access the will left behind by Greater Lord Rukkhadevata and learns how to resolve the problem of Irminsul. It is revealed that in the past, King Deshret, a god who stood alongside Rukkhadevata, had polluted Irminsul with forbidden knowledge. Although the two worked together to contain the spread of the corruption, Rukkhadevata herself was tainted due to her being part of Irminsul. To completely eliminate the problem, she used a purified branch of Irminsul to create a new incarnation of herself — Nahida — and waited for Nahida to mature and fully erase Rukkhadevata from existence, cleansing the corruption from Teyvat and removing Rukkhadevata from the minds of everyone on the planet, including Nahida, except for the Traveler. Shortly after Nahida completes the purification, Dottore reappears and he and Nahida conduct a negotiation in which the Gnoses were to be given to him, to which Nahida agrees. After these events, Nahida regains her freedom, reorganizes the Akademiya, punishes the corrupt sages, and shuts down the Akasha system. She later burns Irminsul in order to save Teyvat from the threat posed by the Fatui Harbinger, Il Dottore. After that, she joins all of Teyvat in protecting the world against the Nails of Retribution. (Note: The Nails of Retribution are giant nails hanging in the sky, created by Celestia, to combat deviations from a divine plan made by the Heavenly Principles, Teyvat's ruler.)

=== Gameplay ===
Nahida is a five-star Dendro element user who uses a catalyst in combat. (Note: Catalysts are a type of weapon in the game which take the form of magic books, tomes, etc.) Players can obtain her through the game's gacha system and add her to their party. Her Elemental Skill can mark up to eight enemies at once; when elemental reactions are triggered on any one of the marked enemies, all such enemies take damage simultaneously. Her Elemental Burst creates a field called the Shrine of Maya, within which the presence of Pyro (fire), Electro (electricity), and Hydro (water) characters in the party enhances Nahida's abilities. Her Elemental Skill can also interact with collectible items in the game, making it easier for players to gather resources outside of combat.

== Promotion ==
Nahida first appeared in July 2022 in a Sumeru preview trailer released by miHoYo. Although her identity was not yet officially revealed, players had already speculated that she was the god associated with Sumeru. She later debuted as a non-player character (NPC) in version 3.0 on August 24 of that year, where she assists the Traveler (the game's protagonist) in the main storyline. On Nahida's birthday, October 27, miHoYo released a character teaser for her entitled "Happy Birthday", which contained information about her lore and backstory. On October 28, miHoYo also released a web event titled "With Wisdom's Dream Fulfilled" centered around Nahida. In it, she participates in the Sabzeruz Festival held in Sumeru City within a dream, echoing the events of the Sumeru main storyline. On October 31, a character demo called "Boundless Bliss" was released which explored her gameplay. She was released as a playable character in version 3.2 on November 2, and miHoYo released her signature weapon, "A Thousand Floating Dreams", at that time.

== Reception ==
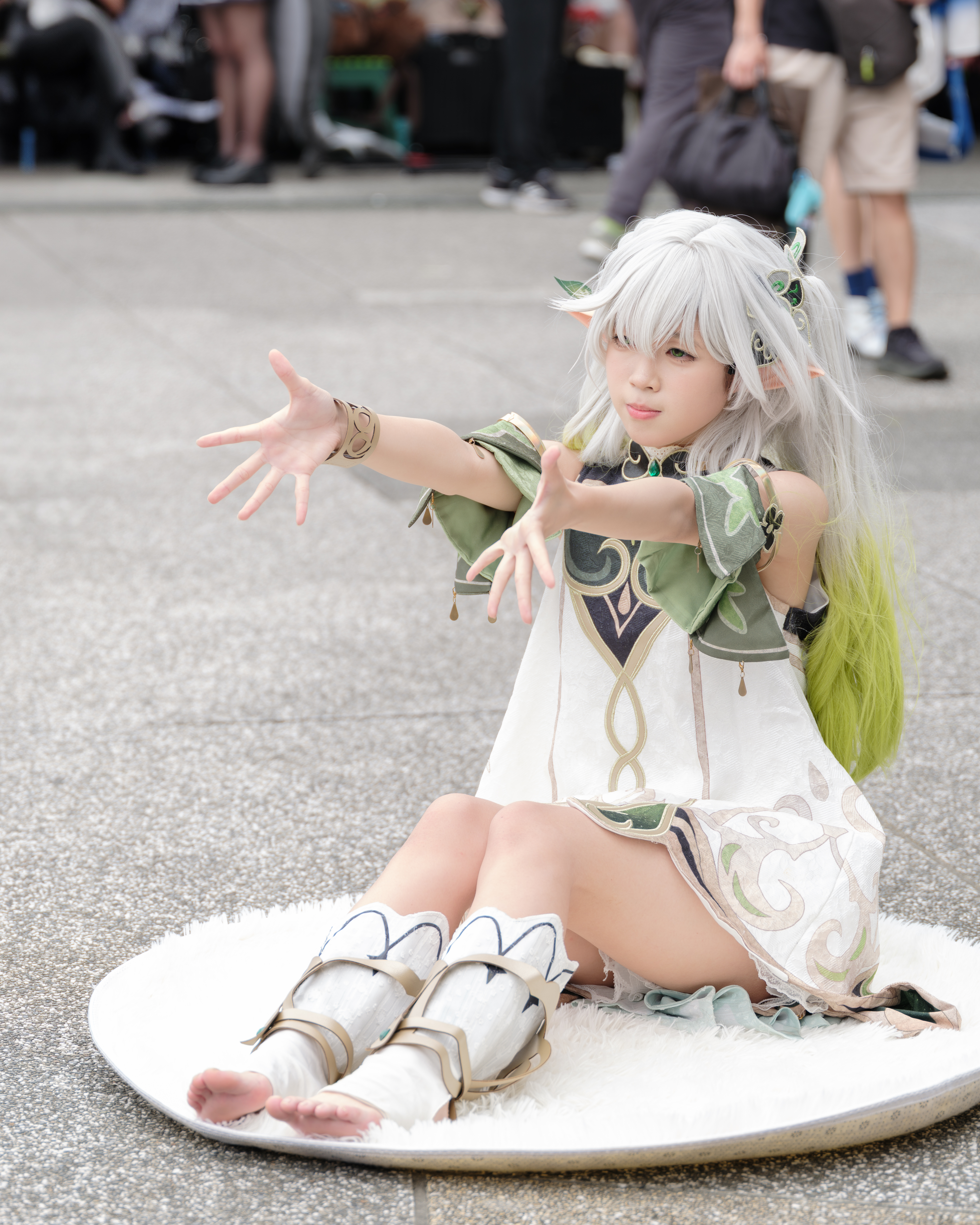
Cosplay of Nahida at an event in Taiwan

When Nahida was first revealed, player reception was mostly positive. Players generally supported her young-girl design and even created fan works featuring her, in addition to cosplaying as her. Within a week of release, her character promotional video (PV) reached 7.7 million views on Bilibili, surpassing most Genshin Impact character PVs. The topic trended on Twitter in thirteen countries and regions, and the story depicted in the video inspired fan-created works depicting scenarios such as rescuing Nahida. On the App Store in mainland China alone, the banner featuring Nahida and Yoimiya generated over US$34,000,000 in revenue during its first week, setting a new record for character banners, with Nahida accounting for 95% of that total.

=== Story and characterization ===
Critics also discussed Nahida's role within the narrative and broader themes of the game. Takayuki Sawahata, writing for Automaton, said that Sumeru's main story, as well as Nahida's story quest, presents the opposite theme compared to Inazuma, and asks the question "what if a god were unfit to rule?", and that it portrays how people's hearts can spiral out of control. They further argued that Nahida, a newly-born god, knows only the wisdom of knowing one's own ignorance, so she borrows the wisdom of her people and learns about the world alongside them. Sawahata added that there was no need for a powerful leader in Sumeru, and that both the Archon Quest and Nahida's Story Quest were "beautifully moving narrative experiences." Sawahata said that Nahida's story quest uses Sumeru's history and the relationships between its deities to connect to broader elements beyond Teyvat, highlighting the game's broader cosmic science-fiction scope while also emphasizing the world's underlying cruelty.

Nahida's role in the Sumeru story arc has been interpreted in academic analysis as a critique of centralized, artificial intelligence-like knowledge systems. Researchers Maurício Ferreira Santana and Geraldo Magela Pieroni of the Federal University of Paraná in Brazil analyzed the Akasha system and her use of it in Genshin Impact as a representation of artificial intelligence, describing it as a centralized system that processes and distributes knowledge through Akasha terminals. They argued that Nahida's decision to shut down the Akasha system was presented as a radical rejection of centralized knowledge control, since she wanted Sumeru's citizens and scholars to retain curiosity and academic skills rather than passively rely on the Akasha. Comparing this to real-world AI, they wrote that society cannot simply "turn off" AI because it is already embedded in science and technology, and concluded that "we do not have Nahida to save us from the technodeterminist nightmare".

Dr. Paul A. Thomas of the University of Kansas interpreted Nahida's story arc as being defined by the absence of Rukkhadevata, describing Nahida's self-doubt as part of a broader hauntological fixation on Rukkhadevata because she was a lost deity. He compared Nahida's insecurity with the Akademiya sages' attempt to recreate Rukkhadevata, arguing that they are both trapped by nostalgia for "lost futures" until the truth of Sumeru's history is confronted. A writer for Chinese gaming site Youxi Tuoluo said that what moved players the most in version 3.2 was Nahida herself and that during the Sumeru story arc, players overlooked the fact that she was the god of wisdom and that she should have been more capable of improving Sumeru. Yan Ku characterized the story of Nahida and Rukkhadevata as the game's most tragic to date. She also said the story of Nahida erasing Rukkhadevata's existence from Irminsul was heartbreaking, especially seeing her crying afterward. She wrote that after Rukkhadevata's power was exhausted trying to combat the forbidden knowledge left by King Deshret, she became Kusanali and that "[Nahida, as Kusanali, is] not exactly the same person [as Rukkhadevata], but her essence is still there" and arguing that this is why the Akademiya sages could not recognize Nahida as the true Dendro Archon. She said that Sumeru was thus shaped by tragedy which has left its mark on it, and said that the same can be said for the world in real life. Ku also described the battle of wits between Nahida and Dottore as "badass" and argued the outcome was an impressive victory for her considering her poor position at the start of the story.

A writer for Youxi Tuoluo said that players experienced Nahida's charm, kindness, and gentle personality throughout the story, and that her innocence became more rooted in players' minds during the Akademiya's attempt to create a false god. They wrote that her characterization had gained new depth, showing her confusion as a new god, her doubts about her qualifications as a deity, and her ability to feel anger and take initiative against powerful enemies. They concluded that "in the hearts of players, she has truly grown into the wisdom god of Sumeru." Ryan Clouse of Screen Rant compared Nahida with other Archons, arguing that she was the most regionally distinctive among them and that her animations reflected both her personality and Sumeru's themes of technology and wisdom. Stephanie Liu of Siliconera argued that players invested in the story may have grown fond of Nahida due to her personality and portrayal, both in the main plot and in her story quest.

=== Promotion and gameplay ===
Critics generally described Nahida's promotional videos as emphasizing tonal contrast and narrative-driven storytelling. Youxi Tuoluo wrote that the tone of her character teaser, "Happy Birthday", shifts from joy to sorrow, transitioning from scenes of Nahida surrounded by friends to her being dragged away and jailed by the Akademiya; the writer said a similar contrast in her combat video underscored her tragic situation and increased players' affection for her. Yan Ku described "Happy Birthday" as tragic and bleak, calling it the game's most disturbing teaser to date. She believed there was a high chance players were readying themselves to avenge Nahida for the poor treatment the scholars gave her. Ku concluded her review by stating that she hoped Nahida would be able to celebrate her next birthday with friends and loved ones, and that she would not have to "suffer from the greed of the people who locked her away". An editor for Youxi Putao compared Nahida's imprisonment in the Akademiya to a dark fairy tale. Grey Pigeon of Youxi Putao wrote that the story emphasis in Nahida's promotional video made her stand out, and analyzed the video as using plot twists to show her duality as a character. Grey Pigeon also described Nahida as protective, highlighting that her first reaction when facing enemies in public is to save nearby people, and said miHoYo gradually revealed her personality by first presenting her as weak before later revealing her strength. GamesRadar+ reviewer Austin Wood argued that Sumeru's main storyline and Nahida's dramatic development made players want to help and protect her.

In terms of gameplay, reviewer Hajrudin Krdzic of Game Rant stated that as the first five-star Dendro support character in the game, Nahida's introduction could potentially reshape the roles of all characters in the game. Because her elemental abilities can trigger reactions with many other characters' skills, the community gave her the nickname "Archon of elemental reactions". Rebecca Jones of Rock, Paper, Shotgun described Nahida as an unexpectedly versatile character who can fill nearly any role in a team; her biggest weakness is her low hit points, meaning players need to support her with characters who heal. Her Elemental Burst creating a unique space was compared to domain expansion in the anime Jujutsu Kaisen, and some fans compared her Elemental Skill to Makima from the opening sequence of the anime Chainsaw Man; Inside writer Sawadee Otsuka also compared the animation used for her Elemental Skill to Yoshiage Kira's camera-shutter pose from JoJo's Bizarre Adventure. Otsuka said the comparison to Chainsaw Man was likely a coincidence.
