= Locations of Genshin Impact =

List of locations in the 2020 video game

The 2020 video game Genshin Impact takes place in the world of Teyvat, a planet which is divided up into seven nations, each of which has its own unique subareas and takes inspiration from real-world cultures and other elements. Each nation is ruled by a god, or Archon, and is associated with a certain ideal.

== List ==
Teyvat's major regions
Region	Element	Archon	Vessel	Ruler	Ideal	Governing Body
Mondstadt	Anemo	Barbatos	Venti	Varka	Freedom	Knights of Favonius
Liyue	Geo	Morax (Note: Also known in-game as Rex Lapis.)	Zhongli	Zhongli (formerly); Ningguang	Contracts	Liyue Qixing
Inazuma	Electro	Beelzebul	Raiden Ei		Eternity	Inazuma Shogunate
Sumeru	Dendro	Buer	Nahida		Wisdom	Sumeru Akademiya
Fontaine	Hydro	Focalors (formerly)	Furina de Fontaine (formerly)	Furina de Fontaine (Note: Furina formerly served as the de facto ruler of Fontaine, with Focalors serving as its de jure ruler at the same time.) (formerly); Neuvillette	Justice	Palais Mermonia
Natlan	Pyro	Haborym	Mavuika		War	Speaker's Chamber
Nod-Krai	—N/a	Columbina Hyposelenia (Note: Referred to as a god rather than an Archon)		—N/a	—N/a	Voynich Guild (de facto)
Snezhnaya	Cryo	Vassaga	Anastasya Feodorovna Snezhnaya (Note: Before her coronation as Tsaritsa of all Snezhnaya, her original name was Anastasya Feodorovna.)		Love (Note: Although Snezhnaya's ideal is love, the Tsaritsa rejects it due to it being related to the Heavenly Principles.)	Snezhnograd Veche
Khaenri'ah	—N/a	—N/a	—N/a	—N/a	TBA	TBA

== Major nations ==
=== Mondstadt ===
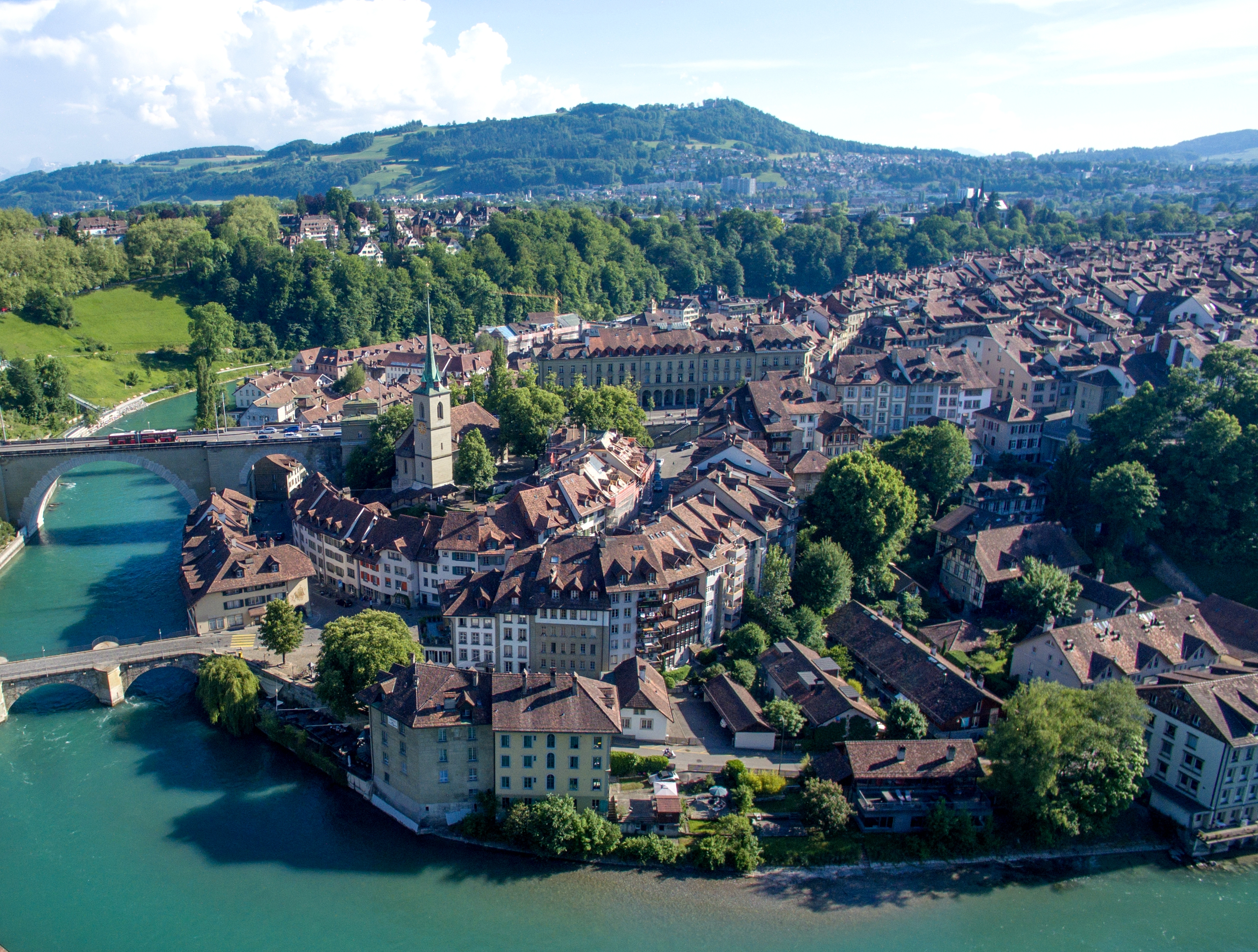
The city of Bern, Switzerland, is believed to be one of the inspirations for Mondstadt.

Mondstadt is the first region players encounter after starting Genshin Impact. It is based on German cultural designs. Its element is wind (Anemo), and has freedom as its ideal. It is guarded by the Anemo Archon, Venti (Barbatos). Mondstadt's terrain is mostly flat, and consists of plains and forests.

The central city of Mondstadt (which has the same name), located to the north, serves as the region's largest city and main hub. To the northeast lies Cape Oath, a historical site, while the Thousand Winds Temple, a ruined shrine to the Anemo Archon, lies to the east. Galesong Hill, located south of the city, includes the areas of Wolvendom (a forest), Dawn Winery (one of the most renowned in Teyvat) and Springvale. To the southeast lies the Windwail Highland area, and the Brightcrown Mountains, which consist of a canyon and the lair of a dragon, are towards the northwest. Players gain access to the latter area by progressing through the main story.

The southernmost region, Dragonspine, is known for its extreme cold temperatures. Players exposed to its Sheer Cold effect for a long enough time will continually lose health if they do not find heat sources. In a behind-the-scenes video, the production team revealed that Dragonspine was inspired by the Matterhorn in the Alps. They noted that the overall saturation of the snow-covered region is lowered, creating a cooler light source. The story of Dragonspine is presented from the perspectives of an ancient kingdom, modern non-player characters, and the player. The team also shared that the creation of Dragonspine’s snow was inspired by the gradient seen in clouds.

The inspiration behind Mondstadt is unconfirmed and has been cause for speculation. Terry Bass of The AXO pointed out that Mondstadt’s design draws on German and Swiss cultural influences, in particular Bern, Switzerland. He suggested that Mondstadt's cathedral was modeled after Regensburg Cathedral in Germany.

=== Liyue ===
Liyue is located in the eastern part of Teyvat and is the oldest established nation on the planet. Liyue reflects many elements of traditional Chinese culture in its customs and traditions, as can be seen in the Oriental-inspired names across the nation, which are preserved in English via pinyin. The buildings of Liyue are also inspired by China. Its ideal is contracts, and its archon is Zhongli.

The game development team stated that Liyue was created with a Chinese fantasy theme. From white-box testing to art design, scene creation, it took a year to complete. Liyue officially opened on March 19, 2020, and its area is 1.5 times that of the initial region, Mondstadt. In the game, Liyue is located in the eastern part of the continent of Teyvat, bordered by Mondstadt to the northeast and facing Mt. Tianheng to the west. Liyue features diverse terrain, with sandstone formations being a prominent feature, symbolizing the Geo Archon's leadership. The area includes shallow beaches, plains crisscrossed by rivers, towering mountains, and stone forests. Plants in the mid-altitude areas are dominated by poplar trees, with locust and pine trees at higher altitudes, while bamboo, plum, and ginkgo trees grow in the plains and riverbanks. Animals include cranes and lizards that inhabit the cliffs.

As Liyue is themed around the Geo element, warm colors dominate the scenery. Players enter Liyue from Mondstadt through a stone gate designed based on karst arches based on those in southwest China, resembling a thin strip of sky in the early stages, later completing the final design by referencing ancient Chinese plank roads. After passing through, they arrive at the alluvial river of Bishui Plain, known as Dihua Marsh, modeled after the landscape of Guilin and Yangshuo, characterized by continuous stone peaks, dense water networks, and floating vibrant flowers. The iconic building, Wangshu Inn, is inspired by the Lingnan Diaojiaolou architecture, with its temperament resembling the inn in the movie Dragon Inn. The scene in Dihua Marsh reproduces the characteristics of Guilin's multiple waters and continuous mountains, depicting the details to reflect the life of the people of Liyue. The northern Qingce Village showcases a tranquil village with numerous terraces and is inspired by the Longji Mountain and Rice Terraces. The tributaries of Bishui River wind down from Dihua Marsh, eventually merging into "Luhua Pool", inspired by the iconic calc-sinter terraces of Huanglong Nature Reserve in Sichuan. The Huanglong Scenic Area is the only well-preserved plateau wetland in mainland China, and the production team believed that Huanglong possessed a sense of "dreaminess" and "mystery" beyond reality. Therefore, they chose Huanglong as a reference for Liyue's "ecosystem". The prototype of Liyue's Luhua Pool is located in Huanglong's Five-Color Pond. The water in Luhua Pool uses a different material from other water surfaces in the game, giving it attractive colors under various lighting conditions. Additionally, setting high points around Luhua Pool is aimed at allowing players to "more easily experience its perfect side."

Zhuhua Pool, located next to Mt. Tianheng, is inspired by the famous Tianmen Mountain in Zhangjiajie National Forest Park. Mt. Tianheng features an area known as Jueyun Karst, shrouded in clouds and mist year-round, with plank roads and suspension bridges between the peaks. This place is the retreat of the immortals who guard Liyue. Zhangjiajie was chosen as the model because its fantastical landscape seems "a bit out of this world." In the game, Jueyun Karst is the retreat of Liyue's immortals, and Zhangjiajie's towering mountains and misty atmosphere fit this setting perfectly in the developers' opinion. Additionally, the sandstone peak forest of Zhangjiajie aligns with Liyue's theme of the Geo element.

A new expansion area of Liyue, "The Chasm", was released with the 2.6 version update on March 30, 2022. The Chasm features a complex terrain with many unique ecological and geological environments and borders Sumeru to the east. It is divided into an upper and a lower region, and completing tasks will unlock the underground mine area, where players can use the item "Lumenstone Adjuvant" to explore this region. Another new area, "Chenyu Vale", was released with the 4.4 version update on January 31, 2024. It is located in the northwest region bordering Fontaine. The area "Qiaoying Village" is known for producing tea, and its architectural design takes inspiration in the Huizhou architecture in Huangshan, Anhui Province.

Polygon cited reviews stating that Liyue's design is completely different from Mondstadt, featuring more unique architecture, better background music, and more tightly integrated lore and stories. While blending East Asian cultural elements, it retains gameplay, expressiveness, and aesthetics suitable for players worldwide. Kotaku editor Sisi Jiang felt that Liyue is an idealized portrayal of Chinese social relationships, where merchants and customers show care for each other through mutual benefit, and money can build interdependent relationships, unlike the current society where shopping habits are often disconnected from community. Liyue serves as a type of "destination image" and inspires the appreciation of Chinese culture, encouraging travel from international players. Russian journalist Valiyev Samir believes there is a "Liyue Effect", as Liyue is a driver of tourism and a "meticulously crafted virtual homepage to Chinese civilization".

=== Inazuma ===
Inazuma is the third nation to be released in the game. It is based on Japan's Edo period and the culture of the era, drawing from traditional Japanese cultural elements like shoguns, samurai and ninjas. Inazuma's element is Electro and is ruled over by the Raiden Shogun. Its central ideal is "eternity". It is the only island archipelago in the game, and is distant from the mainland. The Japanese word "inazuma" (稲妻) means "lightning" in English. The development team stated in an interview that there are two key points in Inazuma's scene design: the first is to integrate the element of Electro into how players explore the area as well as into the terrain and regional ecosystem; the second is to set a clear theme for each island. Each island was designed to have its own characteristics in terms of plot, setting, and gameplay.

Inazuma is the only maritime archipelago nation among the seven nations of Teyvat. It is located in the southeastern region of the map and consists of six islands. The local environment is deeply influenced by Electro. The southern part of Narukami Island (the biggest and most populous island, to the east) houses the nation's capital, Inazuma City, while the island's northern mountaintops hold the Grand Narukami Shrine. Within the shrine stands the Sacred Sakura tree, a symbol of the Raiden Shogun's protection over Inazuma. Its roots spread throughout the land, and all Thunder Sakura trees across the region are considered its offshoots. The design of the Sacred Sakura tree inside the shrine is derived in part from the belief in himorogi (Japanese: 神籬, lit. 'divine fence'). In addition, the castle structure of some buildings shares similarities with the design of tenshu. Concepts used in Inazuma can also be found in similar prototypes in real-life Japanese history; examples of this include the Sakoku Decree and the Kanjou Commission, both of which were derived from Japanese isolationism. Some story backgrounds also refer to bake-danuki and other forms of yokai. The lead scene artist shared during the preview livestream that Inazuma's rocky terrain was modeled after the stratified layers of Byōbugaura, with alternating horizontal stripes and interlaced lines to express the influence of the thunder element on the terrain of Inazuma.

To the west, Yashiori Island is a heavily battle-scarred island which now contains the remnants of Inazuma's largest smelting facility and which suffers from frequent thunderstorms and torrential rainfall. To the west of Yashiori Island is Watatsumi Island, which features a design reminiscent of the Dragon Palace, a structure from Japanese folklore, purportedly located in the Ryukyu Islands. It is one of the key sites in the game's Inazuma story arc, as it is where the main resistance against the Raiden Shogun is based.

The southernmost island is Tsurumi Island, which is the southernmost region in all of Teyvat. It is perpetually shrouded in thick fog. At the center of Seirai Island, which is located south of Narukami Island, lies an unending thunderstorm.

The design of the subterranean region of Enkanomiya was inspired by Ancient Greece. During the preview livestream, level designers Xuezige and Yiyi shared that the core theme of Enkanomiya's design is to provoke a sense of "solitary exploration". The development team aimed to evoke player emotions through strong spatial contrasts in this area, while the art design sought to convey a sense of mystery and "the desolation of ancient ruins." Enkanomiya also introduced a new mechanic called the "Day-Night Cycle" which significantly affects its gameplay and quest design. This feature allows players to switch between day and night within Enkanomiya, altering the environment and enabling puzzle-solving depending on the time.

Outlets such as Kotaku and 3DM all noted that Inazuma's design shows improvement compared to Mondstadt and Liyue. There had been prior controversy over the game's alleged imitation of The Legend of Zelda: Breath of the Wild; miHoYo used Inazuma to alleviate these fears and to reassure players of the game's originality. Inazuma received praise for the use of Japanese aethetics and elements: Kotaku editor Sisi Jiang mentioned that it received some support from Japan's soft power. However, Inazuma received some criticism for the difficulty and complexity of its puzzles.

=== Sumeru ===
Sumeru is the fourth region to be released in the game. It is based on ancient India, ancient Egypt and ancient Persia. Its cultural designs are inspired by Egyptian and Persian mythologies, as well as Indian epic poetry. Its music features Middle Eastern and South Asian instruments. The region's unique stage design, new gameplay, and storyline have garnered considerable attention and critical analysis. Sumeru's ideal is wisdom, and its element is plant life (Dendro). Some consider Sumeru to be miHoYo's best-designed location to date, and its gameplay and exploration mechanics have also received positive reviews.

Sumeru is located in the central and western parts of the continent of Teyvat and is known as the "Nation of Wisdom". The nation is the largest nation in Teyvat by land area and it consists of two main regions: the rainforest on the east and desert on the west. The capital, Sumeru City, is built atop a giant tree in the rainforest, while its largest port is Port Ormos. At the junction between the desert and the rainforest, there is a sandstorm barrier whose purpose is to stop the rainforest from desertification. The desert lies to the west of the rainforest, with the Mausoleum of King Deshret (an ancient god) at its center, along with numerous ruins from several hundred years before the game's events. The largest desert settlement is Aaru Village, which also serves as a place of exile for the scholars of the Akademiya.

Sumeru introduced the Aranara to Genshin Impact, a race of forest spirits tasked with protecting the rainforest. With few exceptions, only children can see them, and their power comes from their memories and dreams. They live in a place called Vanarana, with their own culture and history in the game.

Sumeru received positive reactions from critics about its world design; Austin Wood of GamesRadar+ said that Sumeru by itself can compare with most open-world games on the market. Sisi Jiang of Kotaku said that miHoYo had broken away from the shadow of other games such as Breath of the Wild through Sumeru. Some commentators have also pointed out the design highlights of Sumeru's rainforest and desert areas, comparing them to the Egyptian pyramids as well as Middle Eastern folk music.

Some media outlets criticized Sumeru's character designs for cultural appropriation. Rui Zhong wrote in Polygon that Sumeru exposed HoYoverse's overreliance on stereotypes and rigid replication of real-world history, noting that unlike Liyue (where developers shared cultural research during character development) Sumeru characters received no such treatment. He also criticized issues of colorism, revealing outfits for female characters, and pointed out that Nahida's design did not reflect the Middle Eastern and South Asian cultures that inspired Sumeru.

=== Fontaine ===
Fontaine is the fifth region to be released in the game. It is based on Western Europe with emphasis on France and the United Kingdom. Its ideal is justice, and its element is water (Hydro). In terms of environmental design, to differentiate Fontaine's outdoor scenery from that of other nations, the development team referenced plant depictions in 18th-century European oil paintings, while the design of Fontaine's mountain areas was inspired by the Alps. Fontaine's urban areas feature baroque and art deco inspirations, incorporating elements of water and clockwork. Fontaine also features underwater areas that are absent in other regions. The developers adopted new technologies to recreate the underwater ecosystem: fish schools were simulated using group behavior algorithms, while water currents and aquatic plants were implemented using soft-body simulation techniques. The overall design of the underwater environment is bright and transparent, and the team filled it with abundant content to prevent players from experiencing thalassophobia during exploration.

The development team introduced new mechanics called "Pneuma" and "Ousia" (jointly known as Fontaine's "Arkhe" system) in Fontaine's puzzles. These two opposing elemental forces cancel each other out when combined. Characters native to Fontaine (as well as the Traveler, the game's protagonist) can apply either Pneuma or Ousia attributes through their abilities, and collecting certain items allows non-Fontainian characters to do this as well. Many puzzles in Fontaine require using this system, and some enemies also employ it; attacking them with the opposite force changes their behavior patterns. Since land-based combat and exploration systems could not be directly applied to underwater areas, the developers created an entirely new system. In Fontaine, characters do not have an "oxygen gauge" restricting underwater movement, as it is said in the game's lore that anyone who can control the elements is automatically able to breathe underwater without issue. The development team also designed underwater currents to allow for quick travel. Characters can also gain special abilities by absorbing powers from marine creatures called "Xenochromatic Armored Crabs" and other species, which they can then use for underwater combat and puzzle-solving.

Fontaine is located in the north-central part of Teyvat, with many rivers and lakes. Fontaine is at a higher elevation level than other areas, and has formed gigantic waterfalls. Fontaine also has a unique natural landscape, including plants such as umbrella pines, cedar trees and sunflowers as well as various species known in-game as "xenochromatic creatures".

Fontaine was generally praised for its environmental and cultural design. Dengeki Online's Ruku Kobato commented that Fontaine's underwater scenery was very beautiful, while Mobile Game Matters' reviewer Willow praised the underwater areas for giving players the feeling of an "underwater amusement park". Willow also noted that the region's diverse terrain and vegetation alleviated "visual fatigue". The underwater exploration experience was also rated positively by critics such as Polygon's Ana Diaz. Willow observed that the underwater combat system was different from the one used on land, and said it "ensured diversity" in terms of gameplay.

=== Natlan ===
Natlan is the sixth region to be released in the game. It is based jointly on pre-Columbian America, sub-Saharan Africa and Oceania, its element is fire (Pyro) and its ideal is war. It is located in the western portion of Teyvat, bordering Sumeru to the east. As of Version 5.8, the nation is currently covering the biggest area in the map of Teyvat, surpassing both Inazuma and Sumeru. Information about the region was first teased during a livestream event in May 2024, during which players were shown concept art and introduced to dragon-like creatures unique to Natlan known as Saurians, which were compared to Pokémon by critics. Each Saurian type had unique terrain traversal mechanics, and players have the ability to temporarily possess their bodies to use those abilities. Exploration in Natlan emphasized vertical movement more compared to other regions, in part due to this. In addition, Nightsoul's Blessing, a new combat system tied to Natlan characters and the Traveler, provided buffs that either increased characters' combat power or enhanced their mobility during exploration.

Natlan is structured as a confederation of six tribes. Humans and Saurians have lived alongside each other since ancient times. They are divided into six tribes. The tribes trade and form close bonds for survival, yet also test their strength in frequent contests. They are united under the Pyro Archon, Mavuika, whose guidance has fostered a warrior-driven society. Central to this culture is the Pilgrimage of the Sacred Flame, a major tournament held in the capital's central arena. Representatives from each of the six tribes, known as Ancient Name bearers, battle to crown Natlan's strongest warrior. This ritual serves not only to uphold martial honor or as a source of entertainment for the Natlaneses, but also to prepare Natlan to resist threats from the Abyss (a mysterious malevolent force being led by the Traveler's sibling).

Distinct from the rest of Teyvat, Natlan is deeply connected to the Night Kingdom, an underground realm of the dead and their memories. When Natlanese dies, their soul enters this domain and gradually dissolves into a vast "sea of souls," losing individuality over time. The Night Kingdom acts both as an afterlife and as a ley line archive, governing memory, death, and resurrection. Natlanese warriors can draw upon the power of Nightsouls to enhance their strength in combat, enabling mechanics such as Nightsoul's Blessing, Nightsoul Transmission, and Nightsoul Bursts.

Natlan's reception was generally mixed, although the innovations in gameplay were praised. One reviewer commented that integrating terrain traversal abilities into both characters and the environment made exploration more dynamic and rewarding for players.

Similar to Sumeru, the reception of Natlan characters' appearances ingame was subject to controversy. Players and voice actors pointed out the lack of diversity, specifically in terms of their skin color. Stephanie Liu compared this to what was seen in Sumeru, describing the fan reception in retrospect as giving HoYoverse the benefit of the doubt. She argued that while some characters might reflect certain stereotypes of real-world cultures, the overall depictions of regions such as Sumeru and Natlan are not presented in the game as exotic. She also says that while HoYoverse does clear research for its worldbuilding and characters, this does not extend to skin tone diversity. Dark-skinned characters, she says, are often underpowered or unpopular among players, reinforcing allegations of colorism. She says that other regions like Inazuma were handled with more care in this regard.

=== Snezhnaya ===
Snezhnaya is the eighth region released in the game. It is based on Russia and ruled over by the Tsaritsa, (Note: The Tsaritsa's full name is Anastasya Feodorovna Snezhnaya.) the Cryo Archon. It is the seat of the Fatui, the military organization who serves in the Tsaritsa's name. It was released on August 12, 2026.

==== Nod-Krai ====
Nod-Krai is the seventh region to be released in the game. Unlike the previous regions, it does not have an ideal or element associated with it and it is considered an autonomous territory of Snezhnaya within the game's lore. The developers stated they intended Nod-Krai to be a resolution for several plot holes in the game's lore that they viewed as needing to be filled before proceeding further. Nod-Krai's natural scenery is inspired by the Baltic Sea area; however, its cultural aspects are entirely fictional and not based on real-life elements. Nod-Krai's maps are divided into two types of areas: natural areas have a forestlike feel to them, while urban settlements have a dieselpunk feel. Nasha Town, one of Nod-Krai's biggest cities, was seen by one editor at Game Watch as "by no means a city with advanced technology"; the editor compared it to a "jumble of junk". Some of the terrain in Nod-Krai has Nordic style characteristics, like the fjord landscapes.

Nod-Krai society is divided up among different factions, and it is described by some to be lawless. These different factions, says the editorial team at Game Grape, give rise to new characters with different visual styles. Game Grape compared the look of Aino (a pink-haired loli design) compared to that of the priestess Lauma (who is inspired by classic Western fantasy character designs such as elves and druids).

Not being based on a specific real-world country or region was a challenge to the game's creative team. They hoped to transform Nod-Krai into a stage themed around individual people rather than nations, allowing groups from different pre-existing nations in Teyvat and with different personalities to better integrate into the story. Author Yang Liang of China's Do News praised this, writing that Teyvat was becoming more diverse because of the creative team's "continuous development of the local customs and culture".

== Other regions ==
=== Khaenri'ah ===
Khaenri'ah was a subterranean region of Teyvat not under the purview of the Seven. It was destroyed during the cataclysm five hundred years before the game's events, as punishment for using forbidden mystical arts which were seen as inherently corruptive towards Teyvat. As a result, all pure-blooded Khaenri'ahns were cursed with immortality, while those of mixed or foreign blood were turned into monsters. Unlike other nations, the people of Khaenri'ah did not worship any gods. It is said that the region was once located deep underground near Sumeru.

=== Celestia ===
Celestia is a floating island above Teyvat. It is said to be the home of Teyvat's ruler, the Heavenly Principles, who has been asleep for five hundred years prior to the game's events. The island can move around the skies of Teyvat, and it is said to be the place where people go to when they ascend to godhood.
