= Dehya =

Fictional character in a video game

- Genshin Impact character
- Official artwork of Dehya
- First game: Genshin Impact (2022)
- Voiced by: EN: Amber May; ZH: Chen Yu; JA: Ayaka Fukuhara; KO: Kim Hyeon-sim

In-universe information
- Nickname: Flame-Mane
- Weapon: Claymore
- Home: Sumeru
- Element: Pyro

Dehya (/ˈdiːjə/ DEE-yə; Chinese: 迪希雅; pinyin: Díxīyǎ) is a fictional character from Genshin Impact, a 2020 action role-playing gacha game developed by miHoYo. She was added to the game as part of version 3.0 in 2022, which added the game's Sumeru region. She later became a playable character in version 3.5. In the game's lore, Dehya is a mercenary from the Sumeru desert. As a playable character, she utilizes the Pyro (fire) element and wields a claymore in combat. She is voiced by Amber May in English, Ayaka Fukuhara in Japanese, Chen Yu in Chinese, and Kim Hyeon-sim in Korean.

Dehya's design and role in Genshin Impact led to her becoming a fan-favorite early on. Upon her introduction as a playable character, critics and fans viewed her playstyle as underwhelming and inferior to most of the game's other characters, including those of a lower rank than hers. A social media campaign began with the goal to persuade miHoYo into making the character more powerful, to no avail. Some fans believed that the character's low performance was a deliberate attempt from miHoYo to make darker-skinned characters less powerful, noting that she and most other darker-skinned playable characters in the game were generally weak and underwhelming.

== Design and voice acting ==
Dehya is a tall, female character whose design consists of a red-and-black outfit, black hair with blonde highlighted ends, and a garment similar to cat ears on the top of her head. Her outfit has been described as a punk outfit and a "harem outfit". Dehya is one of the only playable characters in Genshin Impact to be tan-skinned; at the time of her introduction in 2023, she was one of five characters to have a darker skin tone compared to the rest of the game's characters.

The appearance of Dehya was inspired by Al-Kahina (also known as Dihya), a Berber warrior and queen of the Aurès. Likewise, Dehya's role in Genshin Impact is as a mercenary. In the game's lore, Dehya also goes by the nickname "Flame-Mane". Dehya is voiced in Chen Yu in Chinese, Amber May in English, Japanese by Ayaka Fukuhara, and Kim Hyeon-sim in Korean.

In an interview, Fukuhara said that she immediately felt Dehya's strong appeal from the character sheet and lines at the audition stage, describing her as "cool and beautiful to the point that people of all ages would be captivated." She noted on Genshin Impact's official podcast that the staff initially asked her to portray Dehya in a "sexy" direction during auditions, but that the character's final performance and recording gradually shifted toward a more mature, composed, and heroic temperament. Fukuhara described Dehya as not only a fighter, but also someone who retains a girlish delicacy and charm; for example, her interest in makeup and accessories, with details such as her defined abs, earrings, and scenes where she gazes at her makeup kit helping make the character feel more vivid. Fukuhara added that in her acting, she focused on balancing Dehya's "roughness with elegance" and "refreshing straightforwardness with strategic thinking", letting Dehya feel playfully natural in her interactions with characters such as Alhaitham and Cyno, while also giving emotional weight and human warmth to scenes involving her father.

== Appearances ==
Dehya was first added to Genshin Impact version 3.0, which introduced the region of Sumeru. In the lore, she serves as the bodyguard of Dunyarzad, a prominent character in the Sumeru story quest and a servant of Lesser Lord Kusanali. Dehya originates from the desert region of Sumeru, known as the Great Red Sand, where large parts of the population train themselves to become mercenaries. She is affiliated with the Eremites, a loosely-established group of mercenaries that reside in the deserts. Dehya plays a significant role in the Sumeru Archon Quest, accompanying Dunyarzad and assisting the game's protagonist, the Traveler, along their journey.

Dehya became a playable character with the release of version 3.5 on March 1, 2023. She utilizes the Pyro element (Note: "Pyro" is the fire-based element in Genshin Impact) and uses Claymore weapons. Her Elemental Skill increases the player's party's resistance to interruption, allowing other party members to keep attacking without being knocked over by an enemy and work as if they had a shield. Meanwhile, her Elemental Burst grants her Pyro-charged fists for a short period of time. Though able to push enemies away, it limits her attack range to what is directly in front of her and prevents other attacks from being used while it is active.

== Reception ==
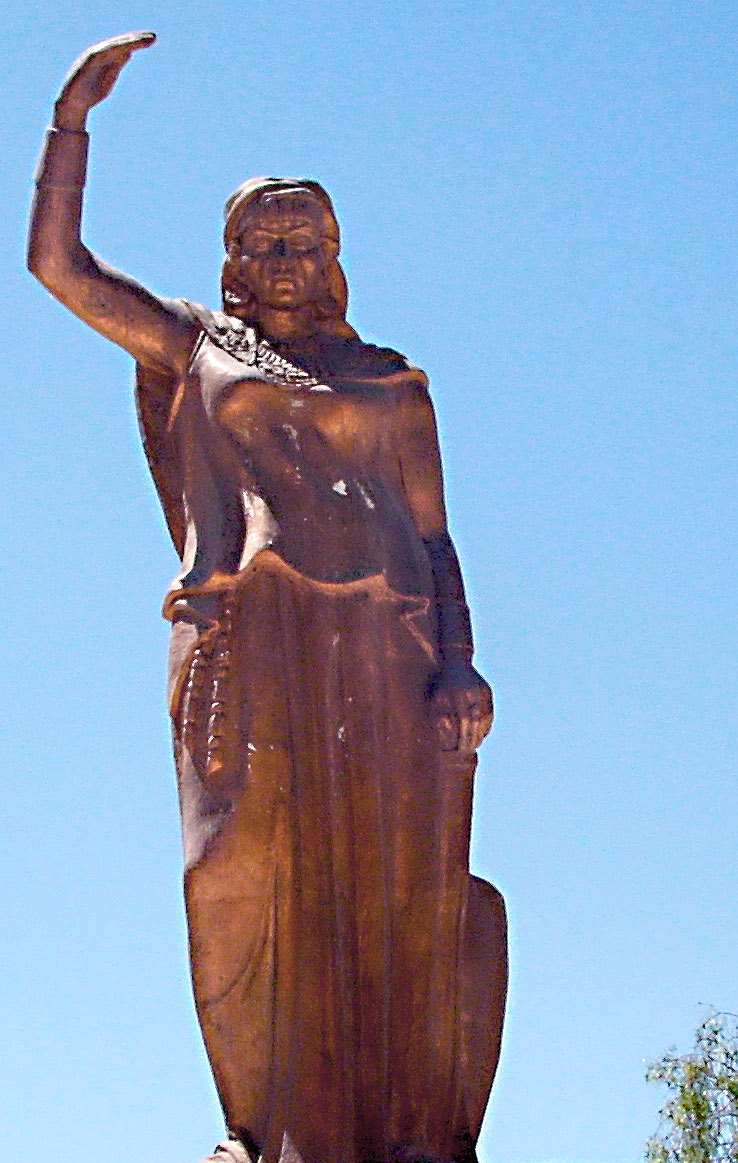
A statue of Kahina, also known as Dihya, in Khenchela, Algeria. The appearance of Kahina served as inspiration for the design of Dehya.

Before being added as a playable character, Dehya garnered a large following of fans. Players praised her role and personality throughout the game's story quests, as well as her appearance. Part of her following was due to her being one of Genshin Impact's few dark-skinned characters. The announcement that Dehya would become a playable character in Genshin Impact was met with widespread acclaim from players, who anticipated her introduction. Her addition was announced through the release of a teaser trailer, in which Dehya is shown utilizing all of her "life savings" to open up a charity organization in Sumeru, named the Wall of Hope, after saving a child from a violent sandstorm. The Wall of Hope name was based on Project Hope, a Chinese-based charity organization. Following the trailer's release, thousands of Chinese players donated 680 Renminbi each to the organization, a reference to the highest amount Chinese players can spend on Genesis Crystals, an in-game currency, at a time.

Upon introduction, multiple critics and fans found her playstyle to be underwhelming. Reviewing her upon release, Jess Reyes of Inverse noted the character's lack of damage output, slow attack speed and cooldowns, and overall low power compared to most other characters in the game. They believed that to make her usable one would be required to pair her with some of the game's strongest units. Reyes stated that most other Pyro characters in the game were better than her, and even labeling her redundant and inferior to another claymore-wielding Pyro character, Diluc. Austin Wood of GamesRadar+ noted the perpetual decline in playerbase views of Dehya's kit, and how even the demo video demonstrating her gameplay showed her missing attacks due to inconsistent, low reach as well as drastically low damage output. Wood viewed her abilities in combat as less viable than 4-star characters, let alone other 5-star characters, which Dehya is one of. He further claimed that while multiple players awaited the ability to play as Dehya, they were being met with one of the game's worst characters. Stephanie Liu of Siliconera wrote that Dehya, despite gaining some viability in Genshin Impact's meta due to the addition of stronger support characters, was a "horrible unit". In a 2025 tier list of Genshin Impact characters published by PCGamesN, Christian Vaz ranked Dehya as the worst character in the game, writing that even if she was equipped with the best materials to make her as powerful as possible, her abilities are "so awkward that they struggle to synergize with a party designed to buff her kit".

In response to Dehya's lack of power, thousands of fans started a social media movement with the goal to persuade miHoYo into making the character more powerful. According to NME, by March 9, 2023, the movement had garnered over 44,000 posts on Twitter using the hashtag "#FixDehya", and had begun trending on the website in Japan. Further ridicule towards the situation came when an update was made to her character that, rather than improving her abilities in combat, merely fixed a visual bug with her eye color. Multiple fans and critics believed that Dehya's poor performance in combat was deliberate, accusing miHoYo of being racially motivated against darker-skinned characters. Wood and Liu both noted that the majority of Genshin Impact's playable characters with darker-skin tones, including Dehya, were underwhelming. Wood viewed it as mere allegations based entirely on a "strange pattern", though stated that it was disappointing for players interested in playing as non-white characters.

Tomi Timutius and Bastian Zulyeno believed that the influence of Al-Kahina on Dehya's character went beyond her basic design. They highlighted the similarity between Dehya and Dihya, both being famous figures in their respective factions, the similar names of their fathers (Dehya's being Kusayla and Al-Kahina's being Kusaila); the fathers were also both known for being group leaders, which was cited as another similarity. They also noted that certain mythology behind Al-Kahina may have influenced further details of Dehya's character. In legends, it is claimed that Al-Kahina ordered her troops to light fires, which were then carried by the wind towards the enemy and forcing them to retreat from the barren, burning landscape without resources. Timutius and Zulyeno believed that this legend may have persuaded miHoYo to design Dehya as a Pyro character.
