= Natlan =

Fictional nation in Genshin Impact

- Genshin Impact location
- The Stadium of the Sacred Flame, the nation's capital and largest city
- Created by: miHoYo
- Based on: Pre-Columbian America; Sub-Saharan Africa; Oceania

In-universe information
- Type: Country
- Ruled by: Mavuika
- Races: Humans; Saurians
- Location: Western portion of Teyvat
- Characters: List
- Element: Pyro
- Ideal: War

Natlan (/ˈnætlæn/ NAT-lan or /ˈnætlən/ NAT-lən; Chinese: 纳塔; pinyin: Nàtǎ) is a fictional nation in the video game Genshin Impact, developed by miHoYo. The region officially became available to players on August 28, 2024, with the release of version 5.0 of the game. Natlan is the sixth region to be released in Genshin Impact, and it is located in the western portion of the continent of Teyvat. Natlan is the primary setting for Chapter 5 of the game's storyline, which focuses on the idea of war.

Natlan is based jointly on pre-Columbian American and sub-Saharan African cultures, with some influences from Oceania. Its soundtrack features instruments from those areas. Natlan's exploration mechanics have received positive reviews from critics, though Natlan's characters received controversy due to their skin color being lighter than that of the real-world people on whom they were based, by both players and English voice actors of Genshin Impact.

== Creation and design ==
=== Scenes and gameplay ===
Three out of the six types of Saurian; from left to right: a Yumkasaur, Tepetlisaur and Koholasaur

Information about Natlan was first teased during the version 4.7 livestream event in May 2024. Players were shown concept art and introduced to dragon-like creatures unique to Natlan known as Saurians. Each Saurian type had unique traversal mechanics tied to different kinds of terrain, and players could temporarily possess their bodies to use those abilities. All the characters from Natlan also shared similar traversal abilities without the need for possession. Exploration in Natlan emphasized vertical movement more than in earlier regions, due to both the navigational abilities of the Saurians and the skills of Natlanese characters.

Nightsoul's Blessing, a new combat system tied to Natlan characters and the game's protagonist the Traveler, boosted characters' combat power, providing buffs that either increased damage or enhanced mobility during exploration.

=== Music ===
Natlan's soundtrack reflects the region's diverse cultural inspirations. HOYO-MiX, the music studio under miHoYo, blended Latin American and African musical elements, with teaser tracks featuring classical Spanish guitar strumming, castanet rhythms, and lyrics sung in Swahili. They also added Mesoamerican and Polynesian-style chants. The soundtrack received praise from PCGamesN writer Nat Smith for its authenticity and scope. The Vienna University Philharmonic chorus sung the chants and chorus.

== Setting and lore ==
Natlan is structured as a confederation of six tribes. Humans and Saurians have lived alongside each other since ancient times. The tribes trade and form close bonds for survival, yet also test their strength in frequent contests. They are united under the Pyro Archon, Mavuika, whose guidance has fostered a warrior-driven society. Central to this culture is the Pilgrimage of the Sacred Flame, a major tournament held in the capital's central arena. Representatives from each of the six tribes, known as Ancient Name bearers, battle to crown Natlan's strongest warrior. This ritual serves not only to uphold martial honor or as a source of entertainment for the Natlanese, but also to prepare Natlan to resist threats from the Abyss (a mysterious mindless and malevolent force which only seeks to destroy).

=== Night Kingdom ===
Distinct from the rest of Teyvat, Natlan is deeply connected to the Night Kingdom, an underground realm of the dead and their memories. When Natlanese die, their souls enter this domain and gradually dissolve into a vast "sea of souls," losing individuality over time. The Night Kingdom acts both as an afterlife and as a ley line archive, governing memory, death, and resurrection. Natlanese warriors can draw upon the power of Nightsouls to enhance their strength in combat, enabling mechanics such as Nightsoul's Blessing, Nightsoul Transmission, and Nightsoul Bursts. The Ode of Resurrection, a ritual tied to the Night Kingdom, allows fallen Ancient Name bearers to be revived, provided their comrades have triumphed against the Abyss. If an Ancient Name bearer falls in battle and is not resurrected, their Ancient Name is lost forever. However, those who die from other causes eventually reincarnate in Natlan in a new form. Because the Night Kingdom operates differently from ley lines elsewhere in Teyvat, its memories are largely incompatible with those from beyond Natlan. This distinction is made clear when Xilonen attempts to forge an Ancient Name for the Traveler, explaining that feats performed outside Natlan cannot be recorded within the Night Kingdom's memory. Souls of non-native inhabitants are generally rejected as well, with only rare exceptions.

During the Natlan main storyline, players witness several playable characters compete in the Pilgrimage while they watch from the stands. Later, the Traveler enters the Night Kingdom directly when the Ode of Resurrection fails to bring back Kachina, a warrior they had befriended shortly after arriving in Natlan.

== Release ==
Natlan was released on August 28, 2024, in version 5.0 of the game. The home areas of three tribes, the People of the Springs, the Children of Echoes, and the Scions of the Canopy, were released. HoYoverse adopted a multi-phase release strategy for Natlan, similar to other regions, in which different areas of Natlan would be gradually opened. Version 5.2 was released in November 2024 and saw the release of two more tribal areas, those of the Masters of the Night-Wind and the Flower-Feather Clan. Version 5.5 was released on March 26, 2025, and saw the release of the final tribe, the Collective of Plenty.

Version 5.8 was released on July 30, 2025, and contained a holiday resort area called the Easybreeze Holiday Resort, which is part of Natlan. Genshin Impact typically has a summer event before each new nation's release in which a temporary area is added to the game's map for players to explore and play minigames. The release of this new resort differed from past summer events in that the addition to the map was permanent, although the festivities were not.

Genshin Impact also saw its first release on Xbox during the Natlan series of patches, releasing on November 20.

== Reception ==
Critics gave Natlan a mixed reception, though most praised its gameplay innovations. The terrain traversal system in particular was highlighted for adding mobility, with Screen Rant's Cody Gravelle calling its verticality and speed memorable. Reviewers also commented that integrating traversal abilities into both characters and the environment made exploration more dynamic and rewarding. Beyond gameplay, Natlan's visual design was also well-received. TheGamer described the region as gorgeous and agreed that its layout made exploration much easier. Reviewer Tsukihi of Japanese gaming site 4Gamer described the natural scenery as magnificent, and called the Saurians cute.

=== Character skin color controversy ===
Iansan, one of the game's few dark-skinned characters, is from Natlan.

Similar to Sumeru's characters, the reception of Natlan characters' appearances ingame was subject to controversy. Players and voice actors pointed out the lack of diversity, specifically in terms of their skin color. They say the characters such as Mavuika and Kinich are whitewashed depictions based on certain cultures' deities, and wish that miHoYo had developed them with skin colors closer in tone to the real-world regions on which they were based. Khoi Dao, the voice of Albedo, tweeted that "if a game draws so heavily from real-world cultures and bases a character on the supreme deity of [the] Yoruba religion" then the game character should bear some resemblance to said deity. Dao and other voice actors, including Yoimiya voice actress Jenny Yokobori and Sucrose voice actress Valeria Rodriguez publicly questioned miHoYo on its accuracy in representing certain characters, and Cyno voice actor Alejandro Saab added in a Tweet to HoYoverse, "You still got time to fix it". The Raiden Shogun's voice actress Anne Yatco expressed that she hopes the company "listens to its fanbase when valid criticism is made multiple years in a row about the execution of its research".

Kotaku described the issue as Genshin Impact's biggest controversy yet, originally fueled by the region's first reveal. This was in addition to a petition on Change.org to stop cultural appropriation; by November 2024, the petition had over 120,000 signatures. Polygon first indicated that fans were divided about the issue with many of them concerned about whitewashing, but then followed up with an interview that explored why actors spoke out. In the interview, a Genshin Impact voice actor who wished to stay anonymous due to potential retaliations from HoYoverse told reporter Ana Diaz that "when an issue affects a person's cultural background, and is so egregious in its misrepresentation, like the appropriation of ethnic gods, it's easier to notice." Yahoo News Taiwan published an explainer laying out why players accused HoYoverse of colorism and appropriation, as well as how the specific inspirations for deities made the light-skinned character designs a flashpoint of discussion.
