= Song Joon-seok =

South Korean voice actor

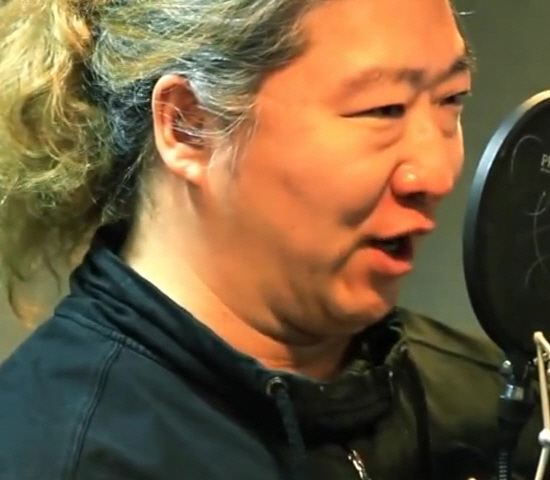
Song in 2013

Song Joon-seok (Korean: 송준석; also spelled Song Jun-seok) is a South Korean voice actor who joined the Munhwa Broadcasting Corporation's voice acting division in 1997. Currently, he is cast in the Korea TV Edition of "CSI: Crime Scene Investigation" as Warrick Brown, replacing Gary Dourdan.

== Roles ==
=== Television ===
- CSI: Crime Scene Investigation (replacing Gary Dourdan, Korea TV Edition, MBC)
- 24 (replacing Billy Burke, Korea TV Edition, MBC)
- Iron Kid (KBS)
- Bobobo-bo Bo-bobo (Korea TV Edition, KBS) as Softon (Replacing Hikaru Midorikawa's voice)

=== Film ===
- 25's Kiss (replacing Thomas Salomy, Korea TV Edition, MBC)
- Underworld (replacing Shane Brolly, Korea TV Edition, MBC)
- Madagascar - Melman

=== Video games ===
- Dynasty Warriors
- Genshin Impact - Arataki Itto
- Limbus Company - Lei Heng

== See also ==
- Munhwa Broadcasting Corporation
- MBC Voice Acting Division
