= Alhaitham (Genshin Impact) =

Fictional character in a video game

- Genshin Impact character
- Official in-game portrait of Alhaitham
- First game: Genshin Impact (2022)
- Voiced by: EN: Nazeeh Tarsha; ZH: Yang Chaoran; JA: Yūichirō Umehara; KO: Jeon Seung-hwa

In-universe information
- Weapon: Sword
- Origin: Sumeru
- Element: Dendro

Alhaitham (/ɑːlˈheɪθəm/ ahl-HAY-thəm; Chinese: 艾爾海森; pinyin: Ài'ěrhǎisēn) is a fictional character in Genshin Impact, a video game developed by miHoYo. He first appeared in the game's version 3.0 update in 2022 and became a playable character in 2023. He is portrayed as a scholar from the fictional nation of Sumeru and serves as a scribe of the Sumeru Akademiya, a governmental and academic institution. Alhaitham's character design draws inspiration from the Arab mathematician and physicist Ibn al-Haytham.

Alhaitham's appearance, backstory, character design, and interactions with his roommate Kaveh have all received positive reviews from critics. His combat gameplay has also been generally praised, but his banner sales were poor nevertheless.

== Release, design and voice acting ==
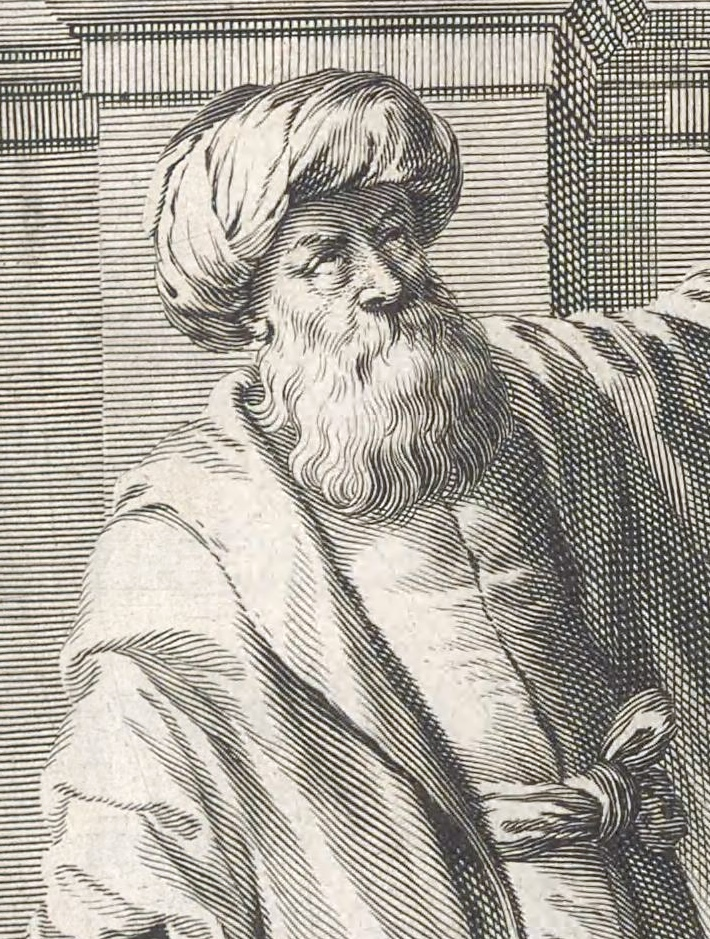
Alhaitham is believed to have been named after the medieval polymath Ibn al-Haytham.

Alhaitham first appeared briefly in the Genshin Impact Sumeru preview short, "Prelude to Wisdom", where his occupation as a researcher was revealed. He later appeared as a non-playable character in the Sumeru chapter of the main storyline introduced in version 3.0 of the game. miHoYo announced his release as a playable character during a special livestream preview for the game. On January 13, 2023, miHoYo released Alhaitham's character trailer "Questions and Silence". On January 17, the character demo "Think Before You Act" was released, followed by a combat tutorial video alongside the version 3.4 update.

Alhaitham's name is believed to reference the Arab mathematician and physicist Ibn al-Haytham, a major figure of the Islamic Golden Age known for his groundbreaking achievements in optics. In terms of visual design, Alhaitham has pale skin, gray hair with green tips, and light turquoise eyes. He wears two big gold and green earpieces. The sleeve of this garment that he wears is his left sleeve, leaving his right arm exposed. He sports a tight black top with a split high collar and detached sleeves, also decorated with golden details and a green ornament on his chest. He shares several traits with Su from Honkai Impact 3rd, another game developed by miHoYo: both have gray hair with green tips, similar body builds and clothing styles, and the same Chinese voice actor, Yang Chaoran. Because of this, Elara Leclair of Game Rant regards him as a counterpart to Su.

Alhaitham's Japanese voice actor is Yūichirō Umehara. In an interview, Umehara remarked that when he first voiced the character, he realized that although Alhaitham is portrayed as an intellectual, he also struggles somewhat with interpersonal communication. Over time, however, he came to feel that Alhaitham's emotions are nuanced and expressive, giving him a sense of warmth. Compared to other characters, Alhaitham comes across as calm but not arrogant, or someone who makes an effort to remain sociable. Umehara considered the role a difficult one and said that certain lines could carry ambiguous meanings that made it challenging for him to capture the right emotion. Alhaitham is voiced in Chinese by Yang Chaoran, in English by Nazeeh Tarsha, and in Korean by Jeon Seung-hwa.

== Appearances ==
=== Lore ===
Within the game's lore, Alhaitham is a scholar of the Haravatat Darshan of the Sumeru Akademiya (which studies topics such as ancient runes and linguistics) and currently serves as its scribe. Although he holds a prestigious position, he shows little interest in Akademiya meetings or policy-making; instead, he prefers to live a low-profile life, reading for leisure. Nahida describes him as someone who is constantly thinking. He shares a residence with his roommate Kaveh.

In the Sumeru chapter of the game's main storyline, Alhaitham first meets the protagonist Traveler in the southern city of Port Ormos, where he provides them with information about knowledge capsules, a way of illegally increasing one's knowledge. Later, when the Traveler journeys into the desert seeking a way to rescue Nahida from captivity at the hands of rogue Akademiya officials, Alhaitham decides to accompany them. Together with Cyno, Dehya and others, they uncover the Akademiya's conspiracy. The group eventually forms an alliance and orchestrates a plan to overthrow the Akademiya sages, ultimately rescuing Nahida. After the regime's collapse, Nahida reinstates the council of sages that had previously governed the country and appoints Alhaitham as the Acting Grand Sage. Although Nahida expresses her wish for him to remain in that role, Alhaitham refuses; in his character story quests, he even considers resigning from the position to return to his former role as scribe.

=== Gameplay ===
Alhaitham is a five-star Dendro character who wields a one-handed sword. His Elemental Skill, one of his primary modes of attack, allows him to generate "Chisel-Light Mirrors" which not only boost his damage output and convert his normal attacks into Dendro damage, but also provide coordinated attacks. According to PCGamesN, players discovered a humorous programming bug related to this skill: because Alhaitham's abilities can cause him to leap into the air, if his jump is interrupted by colliding with an enemy's projectile at the right moment, he may be uncontrollably launched along a parabolic trajectory, soaring a great distance across the map.

== Reception ==
Alhaitham has been generally well-received by players. Fans have expressed their fondness for the character through cosplay and derivative works, including the fanmade Chinese game On Time to Leave, Alhaitham (Chinese: 準時閃人艾爾海森; pinyin: Zhǔnshí shǎn rén, Ài'ěrhǎisēn) which humorously depicts him using his wits to ensure he can leave work on time at the end of the day. Despite his popularity among players, sales estimates for his character banner were relatively weak. (Note: In Genshin Impact and other gacha games, a banner is the game's limited-time gacha event where players spend in-game currency (and sometimes real-world money) for the chance to get certain exclusive characters and weapons. For most characters, it is impossible to get them outside of their banners.) According to the data analytics site GenshinLab, the banner featuring both Alhaitham and Xiao performed poorly in version 3.4. PCGamesN writer Ethan Anderson attributed this to the subsequent banner, featuring Hu Tao and Yelan, two highly sought-after characters, leading many players to skip Alhaitham's rerun. Yeo Hyeon-gu of Inven speculated that Alhaitham's lack of popularity may be because he was a male character.

GamesRadar+ critic Austin Wood praised Alhaitham's resourceful characterization, though he said that the character sometimes comes across like a "nerd emoji". Wood highlighted Alhaitham's outlook on Nahida, as well as his relationship with her, as key to his charm. He also wrote that Alhaitham's tall, handsome and muscular appearance stands in sharp contrast to his position as a scribe, as well as to his central role in "overthrowing a secret police state" during the main storyline. These contrasts, says Wood, made him an especially compelling and popular character. Wood also notes that Alhaitham's release "seem[ed] to have brought existing rabidness to a rolling boil," referring to the Genshin Impact community's attitudes towards him. Polygon's Ana Diaz echoed this, calling the character "hot" and "buff". Kotaku writer Sisi Jiang considered Alhaitham the most interesting character in the Sumeru story arc, writing that while he presents himself as a "frail academic", he is in reality nothing of the sort. Although he refuses to assume a high leadership role in Sumeru, Jiang remarked that his companions repeatedly elevate him to positions of authority, which left her eager to see how his story develops in future updates.

Screen Rant critic Ryan Clouse described Alhaitham's dynamic with his roommate Kaveh as entertaining. Although they live together and both serve as Akademiya scholars, they are portrayed as mirror opposites: Alhaitham, logical and calculating; Kaveh, emotional and empathetic. Their frequent arguments reflect these differences, but they also complement each other, creating a close and balanced relationship. Clouse compared them to Sumeru's rainforest and desert regions, arguing that their interactions deepen the game's exploration of rationality and emotion. Game Rant writer Elara Leclair drew a philosophical comparison, likening Kaveh to Plato's idealism and Alhaitham to Aristotle's materialism, framing their relationship as a reflection of the tension between the two concepts. Diaz wrote that the interactions between the two create "tension and interesting moments" and that the dynamic made it easy to ship the two characters. She said that Kaveh and Alhaitham played out the trope of a nagging wife and grumpy husband. She concluded that the relationship "can be interpreted as romantic" and that seeing that type of interaction makes the world in which it takes place more vibrant. Stephanie Liu of Siliconera complimented Umehara's voice acting for the character, saying "This man could insult me and I'd thank him."

Alhaitham's gameplay was generally received positively. Commentator Lam Cheuk-hang from HK01 and Gozie Ibekwe from Game Rant both complimented Alhaitham's offensive capabilities as a DPS; he can also apply the Dendro element to enemies, enabling synergy with other elemental characters to trigger elemental reactions. Stephanie Liu of Siliconera said that he was "fun to use, as well as fun to look at" and complimented the damage Alhaitham does using elemental reactions, but also wrote that this also depends on the characters Alhaitham is paired with.
