= Sumeru (Genshin Impact) =

Fictional nation in Genshin Impact

- Genshin Impact location
- Sumeru City, the nation's capital and largest city
- Created by: miHoYo
- Based on: South Asia; Middle East and North Africa

In-universe information
- Type: Country
- Ruled by: Sumeru Akademiya; Nahida
- Races: Humans; Aranara
- Location: Center of Teyvat
- Characters: List
- Element: Dendro
- Ideal: Wisdom

Sumeru (/ˌsuːˈmɛəruː/ soo-MAIR-oo; Chinese: 须弥; pinyin: Xūmí) is a fictional nation in the video game Genshin Impact, developed by miHoYo. The region officially opened to players with the release of version 3.0 on August 24, 2022. Located in the central and west portions of the continent of Teyvat, Sumeru consists of rainforest and desert areas. It also serves as the primary setting for chapter 3 of the game's storyline.

Sumeru is based on ancient India, ancient Egypt, and ancient Persia. Its cultural designs are inspired by Egyptian and Persian mythologies, as well as Indian epic poetry, and its music features Middle Eastern and South Asian instruments. The region's unique stage design, new gameplay, and storyline have garnered considerable attention and critical analysis. Some consider Sumeru to be miHoYo's best-designed location to date, and its gameplay and exploration mechanics have also received positive reviews. However, critics have also criticized Sumeru's design for cultural appropriation and stereotyping.

== Creation and design ==
=== Scenes and gameplay ===
At a conference in July 2022, miHoYo first disclosed information about Sumeru. Sumeru is the fourth nation to be released among the seven nations of Teyvat featured in the game, and could be divided into rainforest and desert sections. The rainforest areas are composed of trees and mountains covered with vegetation. In order to show the humid tropical scenery, the scene designers referred to many different types of plants in tropical regions. The desert area is composed of dust storms, oases and ruins. The purpose of this scene design was to show the natural charm of the scenery while incorporating fantastical elements.

The development team designed Sumeru based on the two opposing concepts of "life" and "decay". The gameplay design of the rainforest area is centered on concepts such as life and growth, while incorporating the element of Dendro. The design of the Dendro element that is core to Sumeru is developed around the three concepts of catalysis, wisdom and life, and these concepts are displayed in combat, design and mechanisms within the game.

Sumeru's design was inspired by Middle Eastern and Indian culture. The names of people and places in the rainforest are mainly influenced by Indian culture. The forest spirits in the rainforest, known as Aranara, have Sanskrit influences in their cultural design, with references to the Indian epics Ramayana and Mahabharata. The desert area is mainly influenced by ancient Egyptian culture, with the pyramid-like tomb of King Deshret and the settlement of Aaru Village being key locations in Sumeru's lore. There are several references to Persia in Sumeru and its characters as well.

=== Music ===
The theme music of Sumeru is performed by the London Symphony Orchestra and folk music artists, using a variety of Middle Eastern and Indian instruments such as the mandolin, sitar, tabla, bamboo flute and more. The music team said that when they created Sumeru's music, they did not look for the most ethnic instruments but rather that they chose the sounds that best suited Sumeru. Music producer Chen Zhiyi said that he used two styles to design the music for the two distinct regions of Sumeru: the rainforest area's music used South Asian instruments and also tried to incorporate elements of music seen in yoga, which was full of "life"; the desert scene music used Middle Eastern instruments, emphasizing a sense of epic, ancient wisdom. Chen's coworker Yuan Mengdi revealed in an interview that the scene music for the Withering combines "atonal orchestral music and electronic sounds" to create a sense of unease.

== Settings and lore ==
=== Geography ===
Sumeru is located in the central and western parts of the continent of Teyvat and is known as the "Nation of Wisdom". Sumeru consists of two main regions: the rainforest and desert. The capital, Sumeru City, is built atop a giant tree in the rainforest, while its largest port is Port Ormos. At the junction between the desert and the rainforest, there is a sandstorm barrier whose purpose is to stop the rainforest from desertification. The desert lies to the west of the rainforest, with the Mausoleum of King Deshret at its center, along with numerous ruins from King Deshret's time. The largest desert settlement is Aaru Village, which also serves as a place of exile for the scholars of the Akademiya.

=== Lore ===
Greater Lord Rukkhadevata

Sumeru was once ruled by three gods: the Greater Lord Rukkhadevata, King Deshret, and Nabu Malikata, the Goddess of Flowers. The three were close allies and founded a great kingdom together. After Nabu Malikata died, King Deshret became obsessed with preserving her memory and sought forbidden knowledge, which led to catastrophic consequences. His domain was ravaged by environmental collapse and a fatal disease called Eleazar. To stop the corruption, King Deshret sacrificed himself, while Rukkhadevata created the rainforest and built a sanctuary to purify the contamination. Over time, their history became distorted, causing centuries of conflict between the desert tribes and rainforest inhabitants.

An Aranara

Rukkhadevata created the Aranara, a race of forest spirits tasked with protecting the rainforest. With a few exceptions, only children can see them, and their power comes from their memories and dreams. They live in a place called Vanarana, with their own culture and history in the game. In the game, the Aranara ask the Traveler to help purify the Withering Zones in the rainforest through the "Aranyaka" quest series. (Note: In the game, the Withering is a corruption phenomenon where areas of the forest become tainted with dark energy, draining vitality from the area and spreading decay. It warps nearby flora and fauna into aggressive, withered forms and turns them into enemies, forcing players to cleanse the area using special mechanisms.) During this journey, the Traveler also learns about the history of the Sumeru rainforest.

Rukkhadevata later founded the Akademiya, Teyvat's leading scholarly institution, which strictly controlled knowledge. During a later disaster, she used the Akasha System to combat forbidden knowledge but became tainted herself due to her link with Irminsul, the world's memory network. To survive, she created a pure incarnation, Lesser Lord Kusanali (also known as Nahida), who succeeded her as the Dendro Archon but was imprisoned and undermined by the Akademiya's sages who ruled over Sumeru in her place for 500 years. The sages conspired with the Fatui to replace her, but their plan was stopped by the game's protagonist the Traveler, who freed her. Afterward, Kusanali dismantled the Akasha System and purified forbidden knowledge, erasing all traces of Rukkhadevata from the world's memory, including her own—leaving only the Traveler to remember her.

After their journey to Fontaine, Natlan and Nod-Krai, the Traveler and Paimon later return to Sumeru after receiving a letter from Collei about a strange dream and find a mass evacuation from the forest to the desert under Nahida's orders. They discover that Irminsul is being fatally damaged by another segment of Dottore's Omega build, and that Sumeru is simultaneously under attack by the Fatui; with help from the Seven Pillars and a remodeled Aaru, the people of Sumeru launch a counteroffensive, but Irminsul cannot be saved. Forced to destroy it, Nahida uses the Pyro Gnosis, which she borrowed from Mavuika, to burn the tree to its roots, killing Dottore permanently and transferring the data from Irminsul into Aaru.

After Ronova, the godlike Ruler of Death, damages Snezhnayan Celestial Nail, Sumeru nail that was responsible for desertification in westerrn Sumeru is activated and begins leaking Holy Soil across Teyvat, causing a phenomenon known as the Hallowing that is unhabitable for humanity. This causes another mass evacuation froom the desert to the forest. Tsaritsa Anastasya holds a summit with the other six leaders to cooperate with each other and find a way to pass the Trials.

== Release ==
Like some other parts of Genshin Impact, Sumeru's development was affected by the COVID-19 pandemic and was at risk of being delayed. miHoYo changed its development plan to ensure that Sumeru could be released in version 3.0 in August 2022. Under normal circumstances, players would follow the main storyline and go to Sumeru in chapter 3. Since the game uses an open world map design, players can choose to go to Sumeru after completing the prologue and chapter 1 instead.

Version 3.0 mainly opened the rainforest area of Sumeru. Version 3.1 was released on September 28 of the same year (the game's anniversary), and introduced players to the desert area. The desert area was expanded in versions 3.4 and 3.6.

== Reception ==
The scene design of the Sumeru region has received positive reviews from commentators, and many believe that Sumeru was the best location designed by miHoYo up until that point. Austin Wood, editor of GamesRadar+, said that Sumeru itself can compare with most entire open-world games on the market, including some other games that he had also played. Sisi Jiang of Kotaku said that Sumeru is a "marvel of open-world design" and that miHoYo has broken away from the shadow of other games such as The Legend of Zelda: Breath of the Wild through Sumeru and formed its own unique open-world model. Editor Gray Pigeon of Chinese gaming site Youxi Putao noted that Sumeru's design was stunning and that the area was a "phased summary of Genshin Impact, which encompasses past explorations and completes sedimentation". Game Overview's editor summarized the map design approach as a "mustard seed" containing Sumeru, noting that its three-dimensional scene design "accommodates exploration content beyond players' expectations in a seemingly small area."

Some commentators have pointed out the design highlights of the two areas in Sumeru. Gray Pigeon praised the music of the Sumeru region. They pointed out that the various regions of Sumeru used a large number of different styles of folk music. Its unique timbre and expressions were recognizable enough to quickly establish players' first impressions of the area. They also took the music of Sumeru City and other regions as examples, saying that the music "builds a big world in the auditory space".

Sumeru's gameplay design was praised by reviewers. Polygon reviewer Ana Diaz remarked that the Four-Leaf Sigil made exploring Sumeru much faster compared to other nations like Inazuma, giving her an experience that she compared to Spider-Man swinging through the air. A reviewer from Chinese gaming website Nandianshi praised the gameplay design of Sumeru for "fitting the local environmental characteristics," allowing players to feel the map's charm more intuitively, and also creating an immersive interactive atmosphere.

Some commentators mentioned that Sumeru's quest design guides players' exploration very well. Gray Pigeon said that miHoYo has done a good job of balancing content and exploration, stating that the lengthy "Aranyaka" quest requires players to travel across multiple areas, learning about the Aranara and the rainforest scenery of Sumeru. The main story presents each character as representing a different aspect of the nation, creating an engaging introduction to "exploration, gameplay, and content."

Stephanie Liu of Siliconera praised Sumeru's overall world and lore in contrast to its character design, saying it was clear to her that HoYoverse put time and effort into the region.

=== Cultural appropriation concerns ===
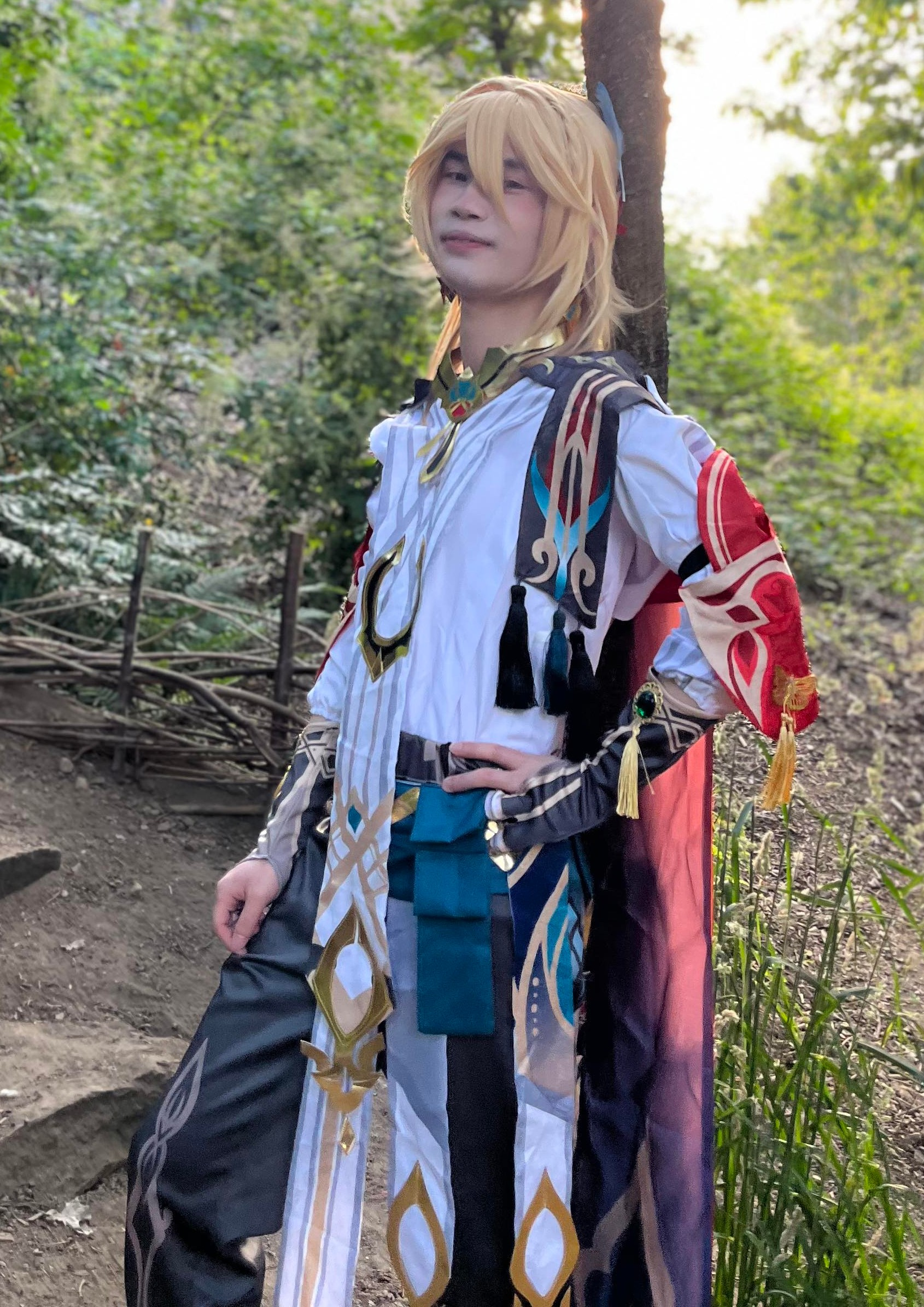
Cosplay of Kaveh, a prominent supporting character in Sumeru

Some media outlets such as Kotaku, Polygon, and Game Corner criticized Sumeru's character designs for cultural appropriation. Rui Zhong wrote in Polygon that Sumeru exposed HoYoverse's overreliance on stereotypes and rigid replication of real-world history, noting that unlike Liyue (where developers shared cultural research during character development) Sumeru characters received no such treatment. He also criticized issues of colorism, revealing outfits for female characters, and pointed out that Nahida's design did not reflect the Middle Eastern and South Asian cultures that inspired Sumeru.

Sumeru was not the only nation in the game to face controversy over representation and cultural appropriation. In 2024, Natlan faced similar backlash over the skin colors of its characters. Liu compared this to Sumeru, describing the fan reception in retrospect as giving HoYoverse the benefit of the doubt. Liu argued that while some characters might reflect certain stereotypes, the overall depictions of regions like Sumeru and Natlan are not presented in the game as exotic. She writes that HoYoverse does clear research for its worldbuilding and characters, but that this does not extend to skin tone diversity. Sumeru's playable cast is largely light-skinned, although this is not the case for NPCs and enemies. (Note: Yonezawa specifically says that out of the thirteen playable Sumeru characters, only four have dark skin and three have been accused of being whitewashed.) She added that playable dark-skinned characters like Cyno are often underpowered or unpopular, reinforcing allegations of colorism. She said that other regions such as Inazuma were handled with more care in this regard, while Sumeru was less thoughtfully represented.

Bruno Yonezawa of Screen Rant also stressed that the problem stems from Genshin Impact's reliance on real-world cultures. He specifically mentioned Alhaitham, who was inspired by the real-life Arab figure of the same name but who has white skin, arguing that HoYoverse should add more dark-skinned characters to the game and that fans should speak up more about these types of issues.
