= Traveler (Genshin Impact) =

Video game protagonist

- Genshin Impact characters
- Official artwork of Lumine (left) and Aether (right)
- First appearance: Genshin Impact (2020)
- Voiced by: English: Male: Zach Aguilar; Female: Sarah Miller-Crews; Chinese: Male: Luyin; Female: Yanning; Japanese: Male: Shun Horie; Female: Aoi Yūki; Korean: Male: Lee Kyeong-tae; Female: Lee Sae-ah

In-universe information
- Full name: Aether (male); Lumine (female)
- Weapon: Sword
- Home: Teyvat
- Element: All (Note: There are seven elements in Genshin Impact: Anemo (air), Geo (stone), Electro (electricity), Dendro (plants), Hydro (water), Pyro (fire), and Cryo (ice).)

The Traveler, (Note: Chinese: 旅行者; pinyin: Lǚxíngzhě) alternatively known by their canonical names Aether (Note: EE-ther; Chinese: 空; pinyin: Kōng; lit. 'air' (male Traveler)) or Lumine, (Note: loo-MEEN; Chinese: 荧; pinyin: Yíng; lit. 'light' (female Traveler)) is the main protagonist of the video game Genshin Impact, developed by miHoYo. The Traveler has been playable since Genshin Impact was released in September 2020. At the beginning of the game, players choose the Traveler's gender, selecting between Aether and Lumine; the unchosen twin is separated from the other and becomes the leader of the antagonistic Abyss Order. In the game, the Traveler embarks on a journey with their guide Paimon across the fantasy world of Teyvat in search of their lost sibling while becoming involved in local political conflicts and the conspiracies of the Abyss Order. They are an interstellar traveler from outside Teyvat with the ability to manipulate elemental magic without a Vision, which is an external magical device that is normally required for most characters to control the different elements. As the story progresses, they unlock the ability to use each element.

The Traveler's characterization has long existed in tension between that of an independent character and a vehicle for player self-insertion. Their dialogue is very limited and their personality is conveyed mostly through their actions, prompting discussion among critics about their marginalization and their role as a silent protagonist.

== Background ==
The Traveler is the main protagonist of Genshin Impact, a 2020 video game developed by miHoYo. They appeared in the game's beta trailer in June 2019 and made their debut when the game launched in September 2020. At the start of the game, players must select one of two twin siblings as their playable Traveler: Aether (the older brother) or Lumine (the younger sister). The two Travelers are identical in terms of gameplay and story. Players can choose to name the Traveler themselves at the beginning of the game, but this custom name does not affect the story's development or gameplay; they can also change the Traveler's birthday. In the game, nearly all characters refer to the Traveler by their custom name or by certain titles; only Aether and Lumine themselves call each other by their real names. In January 2026, the development team introduced a new outfit for the Traveler, along with additional enhancements to their abilities in combat, which players can obtain after completing certain quests.

=== Voice acting ===
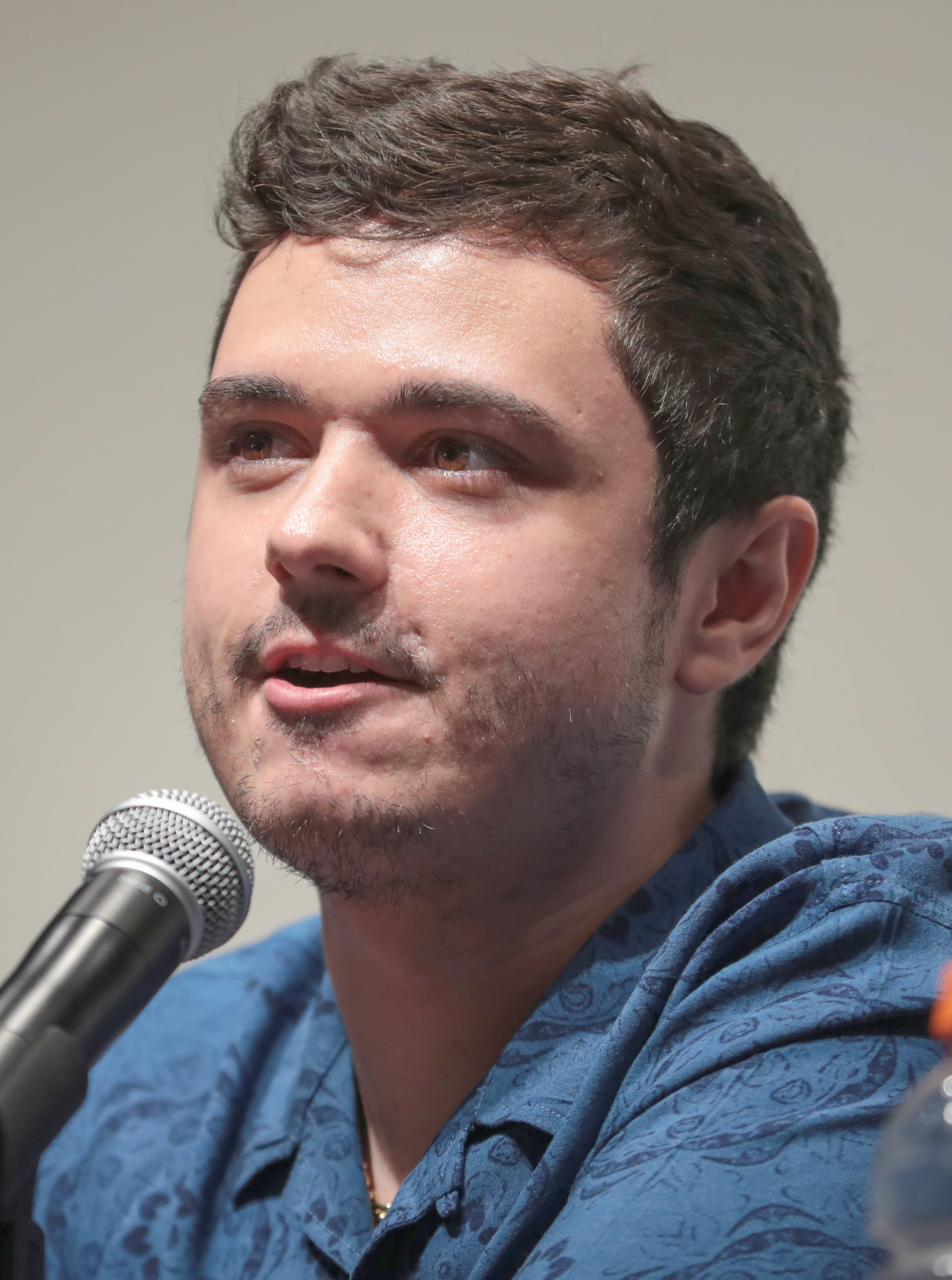
Aether's English voice actor, Zach Aguilar, in 2023

Aether is voiced in English by Zach Aguilar, in Chinese by Luyin, in Japanese by Shun Horie, and in Korean by Lee Kyeong-tae. Lumine is voiced in English by Sarah Miller-Crews, in Chinese by Yanning, in Japanese by Aoi Yūki, and in Korean by Lee Sae-ah. In an interview, Horie said that he approached the Traveler from the perspective of their "weakness", indicating that the depiction of them as "suppressed" and at a disadvantage breaks away from the limitless amplification of a protagonist's plot armor. He believed that the existence of enemies they still cannot defeat after years of traveling makes the protagonist more realistic and human. He said that he did not think the Traveler's sibling was a bad person and that the sibling's tenderness and care toward the Traveler have never changed. This conflict in emotion, he said, was the deepest impression he gained while portraying Aether.

Yanning revealed that she used the metaphor of a jigsaw puzzle to describe her understanding of Lumine: because Lumine was a character built from nothing, she was gradually pieced together through each story chapter and through her encounters with Paimon and several other characters. Lee Sae-ah revealed that Lumine's voice was not very different from her own, but she made it "slightly lighter and more mysterious"; when recording combat voice lines, she switched to a style she described as charismatic to show the Traveler's status as a hero. Luyin believed that as an older brother, Aether naturally shows tolerance and protectiveness when facing his younger sister Lumine, regardless of whether they agree with each other. Yanning said that the director asked her not to make the performance resemble a little girl too much, but instead to be more neutral. She also said that as the game's versions have been updated, the frequency with which she records for Lumine has increased, suggesting that the Traveler's participation in the story has grown.

== Appearances ==
Aether and Lumine are two interstellar adventurers from beyond Teyvat, the planet where Genshin Impact takes place. When they attempted to leave Teyvat together, they were stopped and separated by a being known as the "Sustainer of Heavenly Principles", also known as the Unknown God. The Traveler awakens five hundred years later and, after befriending a being called Paimon, who agrees to be their travel guide, sets out on a journey to find their missing sibling. The sibling, however, had awakened before the Traveler and joined the Abyss Order, a major antagonistic faction in the game, placing them in conflict with the Traveler. The Traveler journeys with Paimon through the nations of Teyvat, becoming involved in local conflicts wherever they go. The Traveler lacks a Vision, a device used by most characters to control a specific element, and unlocks the ability to use each element with each new nation they visit. In Mondstadt, they help end a crisis involving a dragon named Dvalin and learn that the Abyss Order is led by their sibling. In Liyue, they become involved in a political crisis surrounding the apparent death of the region's ruler. Later, they reunite with their sibling, who refuses to leave with them and instead urges the Traveler to continue exploring Teyvat and discover "the truth of this world" for themselves. The Traveler later goes to Inazuma, where they help bring about changes in the policies of its ruler, the Raiden Shogun, and end a civil war there.

In Sumeru, the Traveler discovers that they are a "Descender", someone originating from outside Teyvat, and learns about their sibling's mysterious device called the "Loom of Fate". Afterwards, they leave for Fontaine, where they help resolve a crisis threatening the nation and later encounter their sibling again, though they both lose their memories of the meeting. In Natlan, the Traveler helps repel an invasion by the Abyss. While investigating the attack, the Traveler discovers that it was orchestrated by their sibling to weave new Ley Lines for Khaenri'ah's restoration via the Loom of Fate. (Note: In the game, Ley Lines are a vast underground network of elemental energy connected to Teyvat's world tree, also called Irminsul.) Their journey takes them to Nod-Krai, where they confront another Abyssal threat and become involved in a conflict with the antagonistic Fatui. In Snezhnaya, the Traveler teams up with the Fatui to defeat Ronova, the godlike Ruler of Death. Later, they join the various Archons in a fight against the Heavenly Principles.

=== Gameplay ===
Unlike other characters in the game, the Traveler can use multiple elements in combat. There are seven forms the Traveler can take that have different attributes, each corresponding to a different element and combat role. The Traveler uses a sword in combat. They can use several elemental powers, each of which changes their combat role. These different forms let the Traveler serve offensive, defensive, or support roles in combat.

=== Promotion and other appearances ===
As the protagonist of Genshin Impact, the Traveler appears widely in the game's promotional materials, and several scale figures based on them have been produced. On May 24, 2024, alongside the preview livestream for version 4.7 of the game, miHoYo released an animated short film called The Road Not Taken, which centered on the Traveler's journey in pursuit of their lost sibling. The short features a theme song of the same name performed by the Japanese singer Aimer, its lyrics echoing the Traveler's journey to find their sibling. In the promotional trailer for version 4.7, Aether and Lumine lie together in a field of flowers. The final scene in the trailer has a line in which the narrator asks if the Traveler thinks their sibling has betrayed them.

== Reception and impact ==
Cosplays of Aether and Lumine

Fans have expressed their appreciation for Aether and Lumine through cosplay, with one person climbing a mountain dressed as Lumine. In 2025, during a segment on a Turkish news channel discussing children's exposure to video games, a commentator criticized Aether's character image because of his midriff-baring outfit, triggering pushback from English-speaking player communities. The storyline between the Traveler and their sibling caused significant reactions from players. In the main story of version 4.7, the Traveler finally reunites with their sibling and, although they are not able to physically touch one another, the image of them together made players worried that content in the near future would contain a "major blow".

Writer Yan Ku of Yahoo News compared the Abyss sibling's Loom of Fate plan to Greek mythology, where the Loom of Fate is a device used by the Fates to create and shape humanity's destiny. She speculated that the Abyss Order would wage war against Celestia (where Teyvat is ruled from), but was unsure if this war would be successful. One paper analyzed the dialogue between the Traveler and Paimon from the perspective of pragmatics, finding that the Traveler primarily uses strategies of impoliteness toward Paimon, including belittling Paimon's body size and abilities. However, the authors emphasized that this rudeness is best categorized as camaraderie and that its purpose is to show friendship between the two. They argued that this linguistic phenomenon, in which incivility is interpreted politely, can only occur between people with a close relationship and precisely demonstrates the deep bond between the two characters.

The Traveler's role in the plot has been criticized as insufficient. Gabriela Jessica of The Nerd Stash criticized the Traveler for rarely having the opportunity to move the plot forward and for often being treated more like a supporting character than the protagonist, and she compared the Traveler to "moving cardboard". The distribution of dialogue between the Traveler and Paimon has also been criticized. Austin Wood of GamesRadar+ said that Paimon handles nearly all of the major dialogue and expressive functions, while the Traveler remains in the role of a silent protagonist for long stretches of time. He compared this to the Trailblazer in Honkai: Star Rail, another game developed by miHoYo, whose dialogue is more abundant. Researchers in an article in Humanities and Social Sciences Communications believed that Genshin Impact uses the Traveler to immerse the player in the game's world. They compared this to Black Myth: Wukong, writing that both games establish player entry through a pre-defined protagonist persona instead of branching paths. The Traveler's degree of involvement in the main storylines of each nation has been criticized. Jessica said that the Traveler is drawn into the civil war in Inazuma but lacks an active motivation for participating in it, while in the Sumeru and Fontaine chapters, they return to a role similar to that of a non-player character.
