= Pyrofomes castanopsidis =

Scientific classification
- Kingdom: Fungi
- Division: Basidiomycota
- Class: Agaricomycetes
- Order: Polyporales
- Family: Polyporaceae
- Genus: Pyrofomes
- Species: P. castanopsidis

Binomial name
- Pyrofomes castanopsidis B.K.Cui & Y.C.Dai (2011)

Species of fungus

Pyrofomes castanopsidis is a species of polypore fungus in the family Polyporaceae. It was described as new to science in 2011 by Chinese mycologists Bao-Kai Cui and Yu-Cheng Dai. The type collections of the fungus were made in Luofushan Forest Park in Huizhou (Guangdong Province, China), where the fungus was discovered growing on a live plant of Castanopsis. The specific epithet castanopsidis refers to the genus of the host plant.
