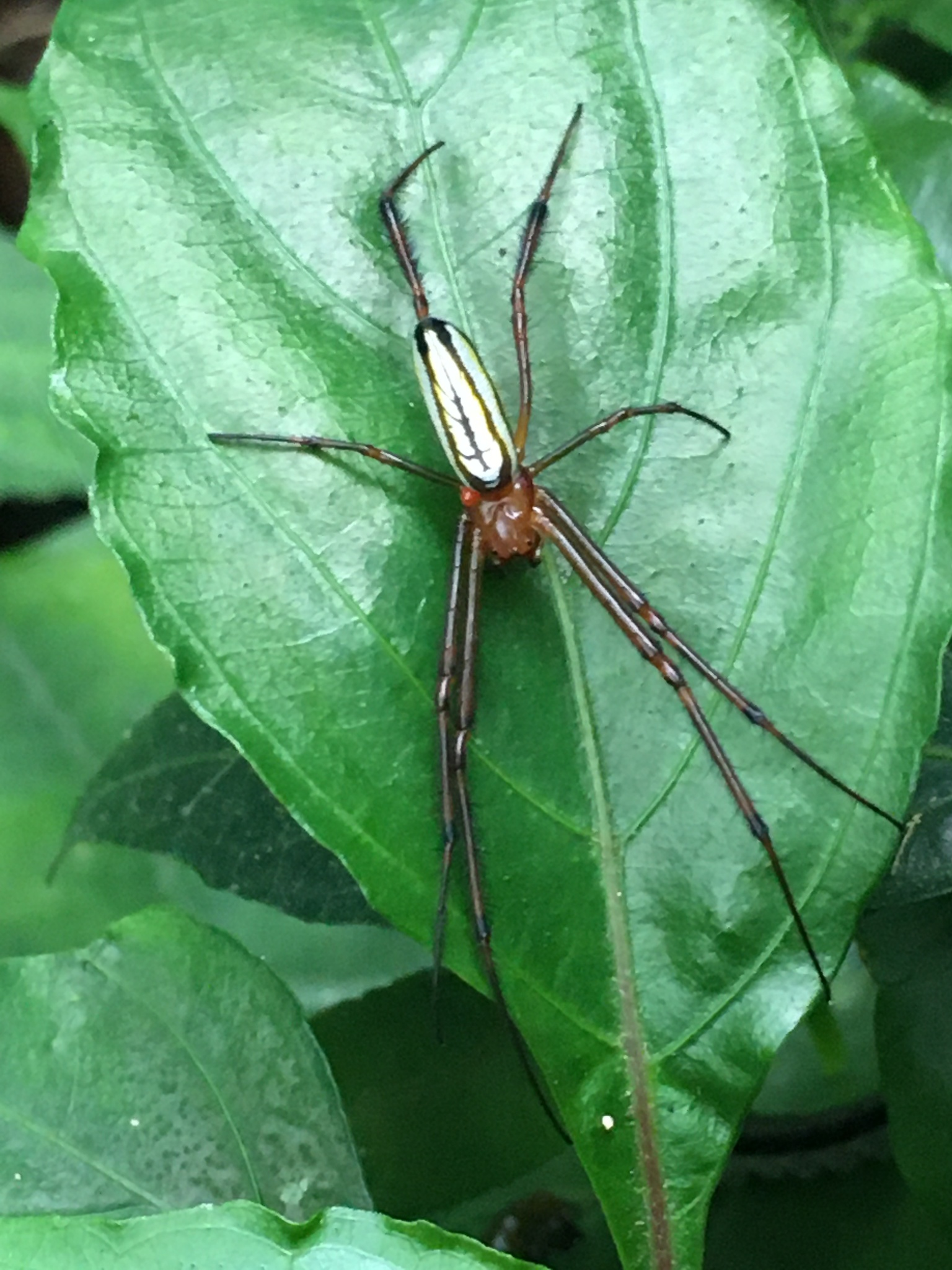
- from Taiwan

Scientific classification
- Kingdom: Animalia
- Phylum: Arthropoda
- Subphylum: Chelicerata
- Class: Arachnida
- Order: Araneae
- Infraorder: Araneomorphae
- Family: Tetragnathidae
- Genus: Leucauge
- Species: L. wulingensis

Binomial name
- Leucauge wulingensis Song & Zhu, 1992

= Leucauge wulingensis =

Species of spider

Leucauge wulingensis is a species of long-jawed orb weaver spider in the genus Leucauge. It was first described by Song Daxiang and Zhu Mingsheng in 1992. The species is endemic to China.

== Taxonomy ==
Leucauge wulingensis was first described in 1992 by Chinese arachnologists Song Daxiang and Zhu Mingsheng based on male specimens. The female was later described by Zhu, Song, and Zhang in 2003. The specific name wulingensis refers to the Wuling Mountains, where the type specimen was collected.

== Distribution ==
L. wulingensis has been recorded from several provinces in central and southwestern China, including Hubei, Hunan, Sichuan, Guizhou, Yunnan, and Shaanxi. The species appears to be distributed primarily in mountainous regions.

== Habitat ==
The species inhabits mountainous areas where it constructs large horizontal orb webs among shrubs and bushes.

== Description ==
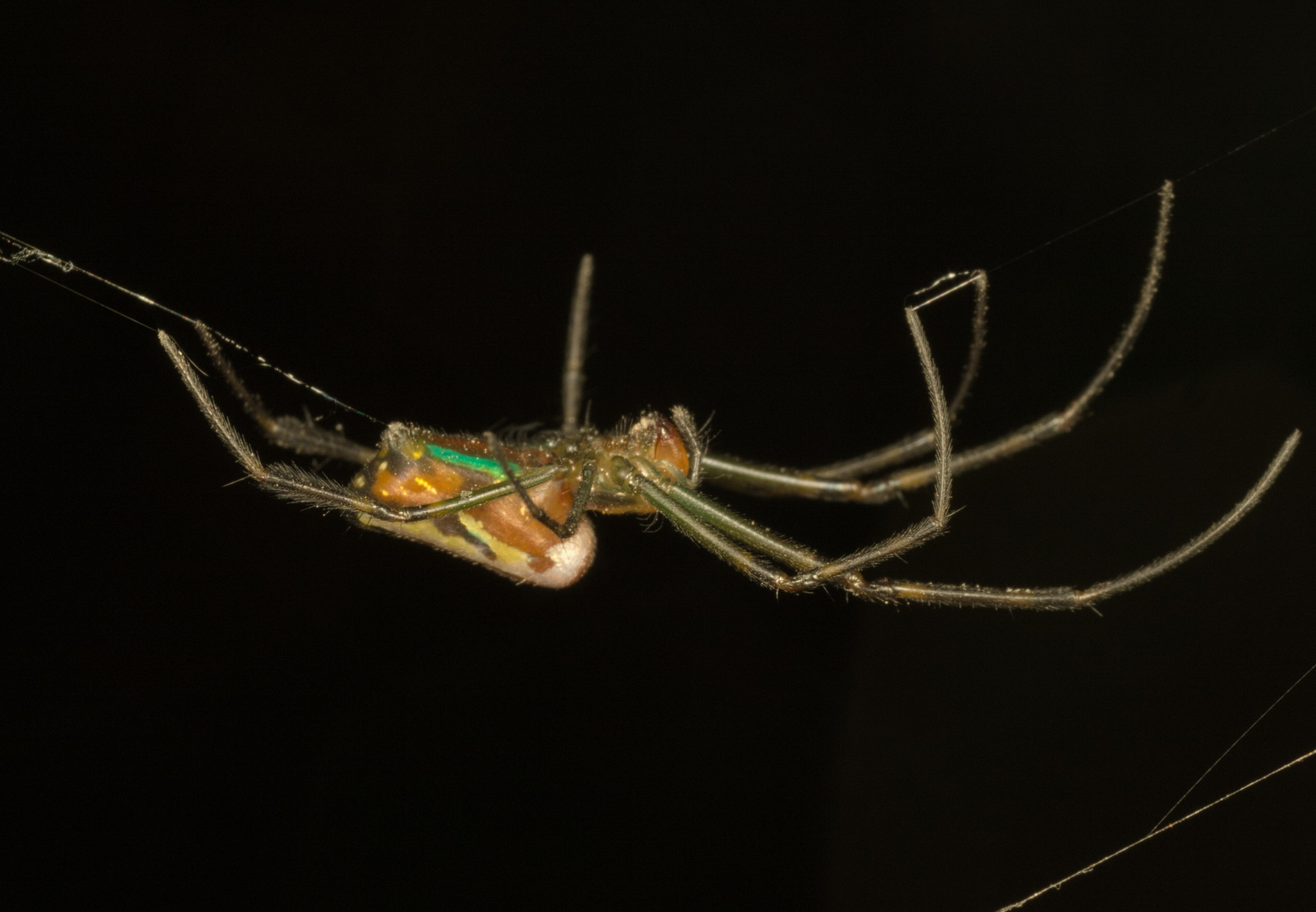
female from Hong Kong

Leucauge wulingensis is a medium-sized orb weaver spider. Females are larger than males, with body lengths ranging from 8.1 to 11.6 mm, while males measure 4.9 to 5.8 mm in length.

The female has a yellowish-brown carapace with darker sides and distinct neck grooves. The abdomen is elongated and oval-shaped, colored silver-white with three longitudinal dark brown stripes that merge at the front and back ends. The middle stripe has three pairs of branches along its length. The legs are pale blackish-brown with darker tips.

The male is smaller and more brightly colored, with an orange-yellow carapace and a yellow abdomen featuring two silver-white longitudinal stripes on the back and a black posterior end.

This species can be distinguished from the closely related Leucauge blanda by several characteristics, including the absence of shoulder humps on the abdomen, the presence of brush-like hairs on the female's leg segments, and specific differences in the reproductive organs.
