= Wulingnus =

Scientific classification
- Kingdom: Animalia
- Phylum: Arthropoda
- Subphylum: Chelicerata
- Class: Arachnida
- Order: Araneae
- Infraorder: Araneomorphae
- Family: Linyphiidae
- Subfamily: Erigoninae
- Genus: Wulingnus; Irfan, Zhang & Peng, 2025

Type species
- W. furcatus Irfan, Zhang & Peng, 2025

Species
- 2, see text

Genus of spiders

Wulingnus is a genus of spiders in the family Linyphiidae.

== Distribution ==
Both described species are endemic to China.

== Etymology ==
The genus name refers to Wuling Mountains (武陵; Wǔlíng) in Central China, the type locality.

W. furcatus is named after the bifurcate tip of embolus in the male palp (from Latin furcatus "forked"). W. inversus is named after the inverted aspiral loop of the copulatory ducts in the epigyne.

== Species ==
As of October 2025, this genus includes two species:

- Wulingnus furcatus Irfan, Zhang & Peng, 2025 – China (type species)
- Wulingnus inversus Irfan, Zhang & Peng, 2025 – China
