= Brianna Knickerbocker =

American voice actress

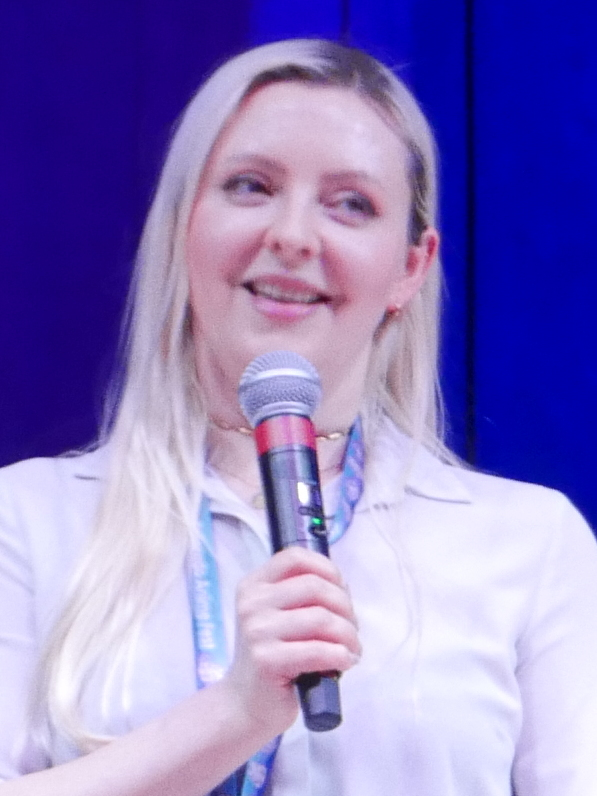
- Knickerbocker in 2025
- Born: December 31; Pittsburgh, Pennsylvania, U.S.
- Occupation: Voice actress
- Years active: 2015–present
- Website: www.briannaknickerbocker.com

Brianna Knickerbocker (born December 31) is an American voice actress who has provided numerous voices for English dubbed Japanese anime and video games. Some of her roles include Kanao Tsuyuri from Demon Slayer: Kimetsu no Yaiba, Sakura from Fire Emblem Fates, Rem from Re:Zero − Starting Life in Another World, Tuesday from Carole & Tuesday, Hu Tao from Genshin Impact, Rin from Catherine: Full Body, Chisaki Hiradaira from Nagi-Asu: A Lull in the Sea, Tita Russell from The Legend of Heroes: Trails of Cold Steel IV, Mint from Neverness To Everness, and Yukiko Amagi from Persona 4 Revival. She is also a singer and songwriter known as Starless.

== Biography ==
Born in Pittsburgh, Pennsylvania, U.S., Knickerbocker earned a degree and originally moved to Los Angeles to work in fashion design. However, she attended a "trial day at a fashion company", describing the experience as horrible, saying: "They were sitting me in front of a computer and I was doing CAD work. And I sat in my car at lunch. It was just such a strong, you know, when you get like this big no from inside. Like you're like, no, this isn't for me." This led to her quitting on the same day. Knickerbocker then went on Craigslist to search for a new career and "saw an acting gig, submitted, and booked it". This led to her pursuing a voice acting job for Japanese anime and video games.

She is currently based in Los Angeles.

== Filmography ==
=== Anime ===
English dubbing performances in anime
Year	Series	Role	Notes	Source
2015–16	Durarara!!x2	Akane Awakusu		
2015	Magi: The Kingdom of Magic	Marga		
2015	Yuki Yuna is a Hero	Itsuki Inubozaki		
2015	A Lull in the Sea	Chisaki Hiradaira		
2015–16	Fate/stay night: Unlimited Blade Works	Leysritt	2 TV series	
2015–21	The Seven Deadly Sins	Elaine		
2016–present	KonoSuba	Wiz	3 TV series and film	
2016	Love Live!	Alisa Ayase	2 TV series and film	
2016	The Asterisk War: The Academy City on the Water	Kirin Todo		
2017	Berserk	Erica		
2017	Hunter x Hunter	Elena, Eta		
2018	Rokka: Braves of the Six Flowers	Flamie		
2018–21	B The Beginning	Yuna		
2018	A.I.C.O. -Incarnation-	Yuzuha Isazu, Gummi	TV series	
2018–present	Re:Zero − Starting Life in Another World	Rem		
2018	Fate/stay night: Heaven's Feel I. presage flower	Leysritt	Film	
2019	The Disastrous Life of Saiki K.:Reawakened	Hii Suzumiya	6-episode series	
2019–20	Sword Art Online: Alicization	Linel		
2019–21	The Promised Neverland	Anna		
2019	Carole & Tuesday	Tuesday Simmons		
2019–present	Isekai Quartet	Rem, Filo, Wiz	KonoSuba arc, Re:Zero − Starting Life in Another World arc, The Rising of the Shield Hero arc	
2019–24	Demon Slayer: Kimetsu no Yaiba	Kanao Tsuyuri, Nichika Ubuyashiki	2 TV series and film	
2019–present	The Rising of the Shield Hero	Filo	TV series	
2020–22	Magia Record: Puella Magi Madoka Magica Side Story	Kaede Akino	TV series	
2020–2024	The Misfit of Demon King Academy	Misha Necron	2 TV series	
2020	Noblesse	Seira J. Loyard		
2021	D4DJ First Mix	Yuka Jennifer Sasago		
2021	Yashahime: Princess Half-Demon	Chiyo		
2021	So I'm a Spider, So What?	Shiraori/Kumoko		
2021	Burn the Witch	Macy Baljure		
2021–22	Shaman King	Pirica, Hana		
2021	Dropout Idol Fruit Tart	Rua Nakamachi		
2022–25	Arifureta: From Commonplace to World's Strongest	Liliana	Seasons 2-3	
2022	Blue Reflection Ray	Ruka		
2022	The Strongest Sage with the Weakest Crest	Iris	TV Series	
2023	My Love Story with Yamada-kun at Lv999	Eri		
2024	Monsters: 103 Mercies Dragon Damnation	Flare	ONA	
2026	Playing Death Games to Put Food on the Table	Aoi		
2026	The Ramparts of Ice	Miki Azumi		
2026	Goodbye, Lara	Lara		
2026	Though I Am an Inept Villainess	Kou Reirin		

=== Video games ===
English dubbing performances in video games
Year	Title	Role	Notes
2014	Mother of Myth	Avatar (Female)	
2015	Elsword	Eve	
2015	Omega Quintet	Aria	
2016	Ys VIII: Lacrimosa of Dana	Dana	
2016	Fire Emblem Fates	Sakura, Charlotte	
2016	Atelier Sophie: The Alchemist of the Mysterious Book	Corneria	
2017	Fire Emblem Echoes: Shadows of Valentia	Est	
2017	Fire Emblem Heroes	Sakura, Ninian, Est, Charlotte	
2018	Detective Pikachu	Kareena Mitchell	
2018	Sushi Striker: The Way of Sushido	Celia	
2019	Ace Combat 7: Skies Unknown	Princess Rosa Cossette D'Elise	
2019	Death end re;Quest	Lucil	
2019	Left Alive	Julia Pavlovna Smirnova	
2019	Chocobo's Mystery Dungeon Every Buddy!	Raffaello	
2019	Pokémon Masters EX	Roxie, Viola	
2019	Astral Chain	Akira Howard	
2019	Catherine: Full Body	Rin	
2019	Shenmue III	Shenhua Ling, Additional Voices	
2020	Granblue Fantasy Versus	Narmaya	
2020	Death end re;Quest 2	Lucil	
2020	The Legend of Heroes: Trails of Cold Steel IV	Tita Russell	
2021	Re:Zero − Starting Life in Another World: The Prophecy of the Throne	Rem	
2021	Genshin Impact	Hu Tao	
2021	Mary Skelter Finale	Sleeping Beauty	
2021	Demon Slayer: Kimetsu no Yaiba – The Hinokami Chronicles	White-Haired Guide, Kanao Tsuyuri	
2022	Rune Factory 5	Ludmila	
2022	Azure Striker Gunvolt 3	Quinn	
2022	River City Girls 2	Tsuiko	
2022	Path to Nowhere	Hecate, Love	
2023	Tower of Fantasy	Yu Lan	
2023	Master Detective Archives: Rain Code	Yoshiko	
2023	The Legend of Heroes: Trails into Reverie	Tita Russell, Soldiers & Citizens of Zemuria	
2023	Eternal Return: Black Survival	Vanya	
2023	Eternights	Lux	
2023	Punishing: Gray Raven	Liv	
2023	Goddess of Victory: Nikke	Naga	
2023	Granblue Fantasy Versus: Rising	Narmaya	
2024	Granblue Fantasy: Relink	Narmaya	
2024	Unicorn Overlord	Yahna	
2024	Fate Trigger: The Novita	Eos	
2024	Card-en-Ciel	Tinci, Kiku, Knight Spirit, Quinn	
2025	Date Everything!	Holly	
2025	Story of Seasons: Grand Bazaar	Mina	
2025	Octopath Traveler 0	Saoirse	
2025	Trails in the Sky 1st Chapter	Tita Russell	
2026	Code Vein II	Protagonist	
2026	Yakuza Kiwami 3 & Dark Ties	Additional voices	
2026	Trails in the Sky 2nd Chapter	Tita Russell	
2026	Neverness to Everness	Mint, Sakiri	
2027	Persona 4 Revival	Yukiko Amagi	

=== Live-action dubs ===
English dubbing performances in live action
Year	Series	Role	Crew role, notes	Source
2020	Airplane Mode	Ana		

=== Live-action appearances ===
Year	Title	Role	Notes
2009	A Brief History of Women	Barbara	Short
2010	The Garden		Short
2012	Voodoo Bear	Office Girl	Short
2012	Two Shadows	Artsy Girl	
2012	Lany's Morning	Lany's Conscience	Short
2013	Yet 2 Be Named	Anime Girl	TV movie
2014	Here She Is	Miss Oklahoma	Short
2015	The Real Housewives of Westeros	Hand Maiden	Short
2015	A Better Place	Kaitlin	
2015	Dirty Cues	Anya Dare	

== Honors and awards ==
- 2015 Staff Choice Award & People's Choice Award for Breakthrough Voice Actress of the Year, 4th Annual BTVA Anime Dub Awards

== See also ==
- List of women in the video game industry
