= Liyue (Genshin Impact) =

Fictional nation in Genshin Impact

- Genshin Impact location
- Liyue Harbor, capital and largest port of Liyue
- Created by: miHoYo
- Based on: Imperial China

In-universe information
- Type: Country
- Ruled by: Liyue Qixing; Zhongli (formerly)
- Races: Humans; Adepti
- Location: Eastern part of Teyvat
- Characters: List
- Element: Geo
- Ideal: Contracts

Liyue (/ˈliːweɪ/ LEE-way; Chinese: 璃月; pinyin: Líyuè; lit. 'Jade or Glazed Moon') is a fictional nation in the video game Genshin Impact, developed by miHoYo. It is located in the eastern part of the game's continent, Teyvat, and serves as the main location for the first chapter of the game's main storyline.

The creation of Liyue took one year, and its design is based on Ancient China, with artistic references to China's Zhangjiajie National Forest Park, Huanglong Scenic Area, the landscape of Guilin, Fenghuang Ancient Town, and the Hanging Temple in Shanxi. This setting has been positively received, praised as a symbol of Chinese culture within the game.

== Conception and creation ==
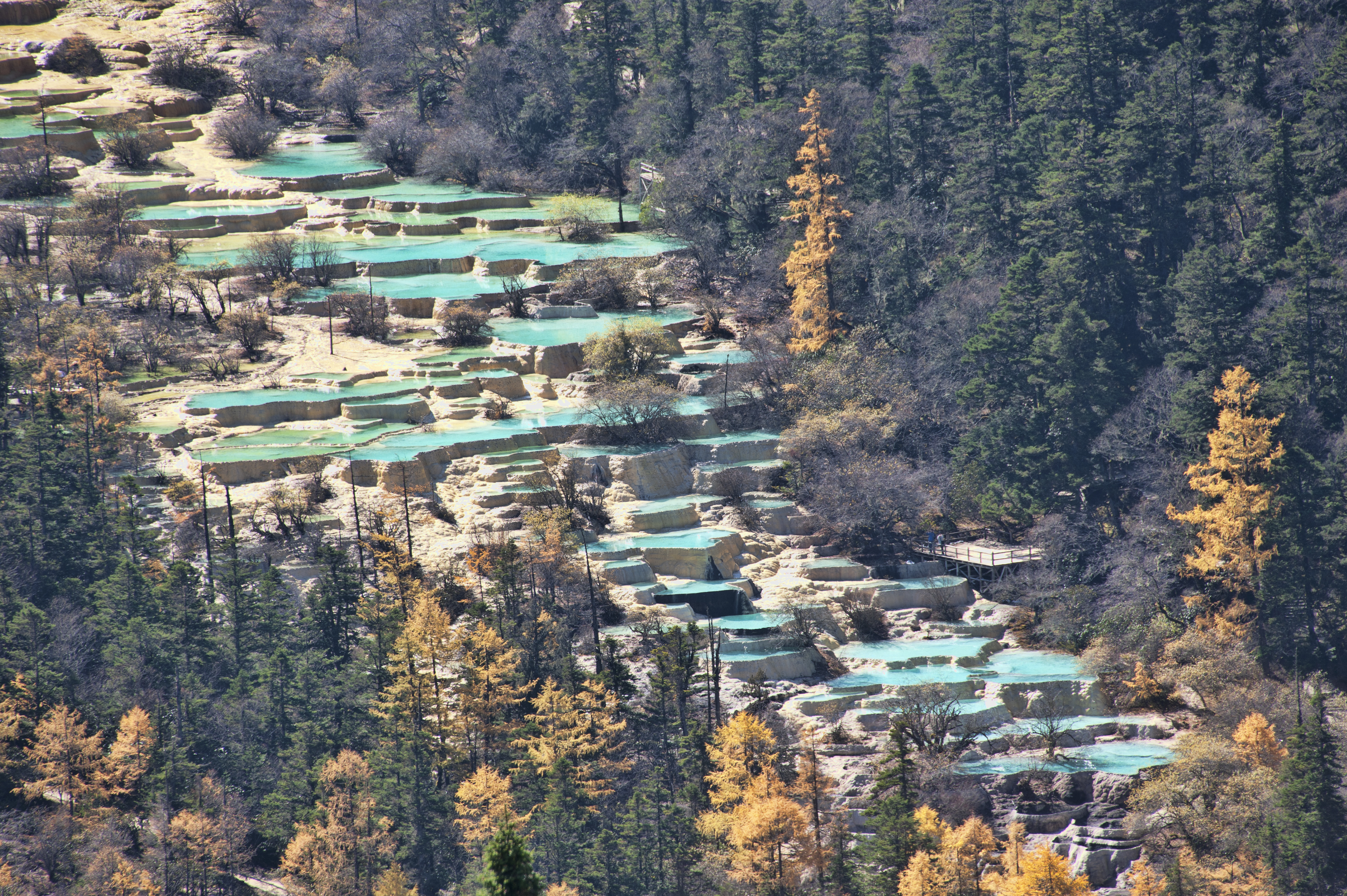

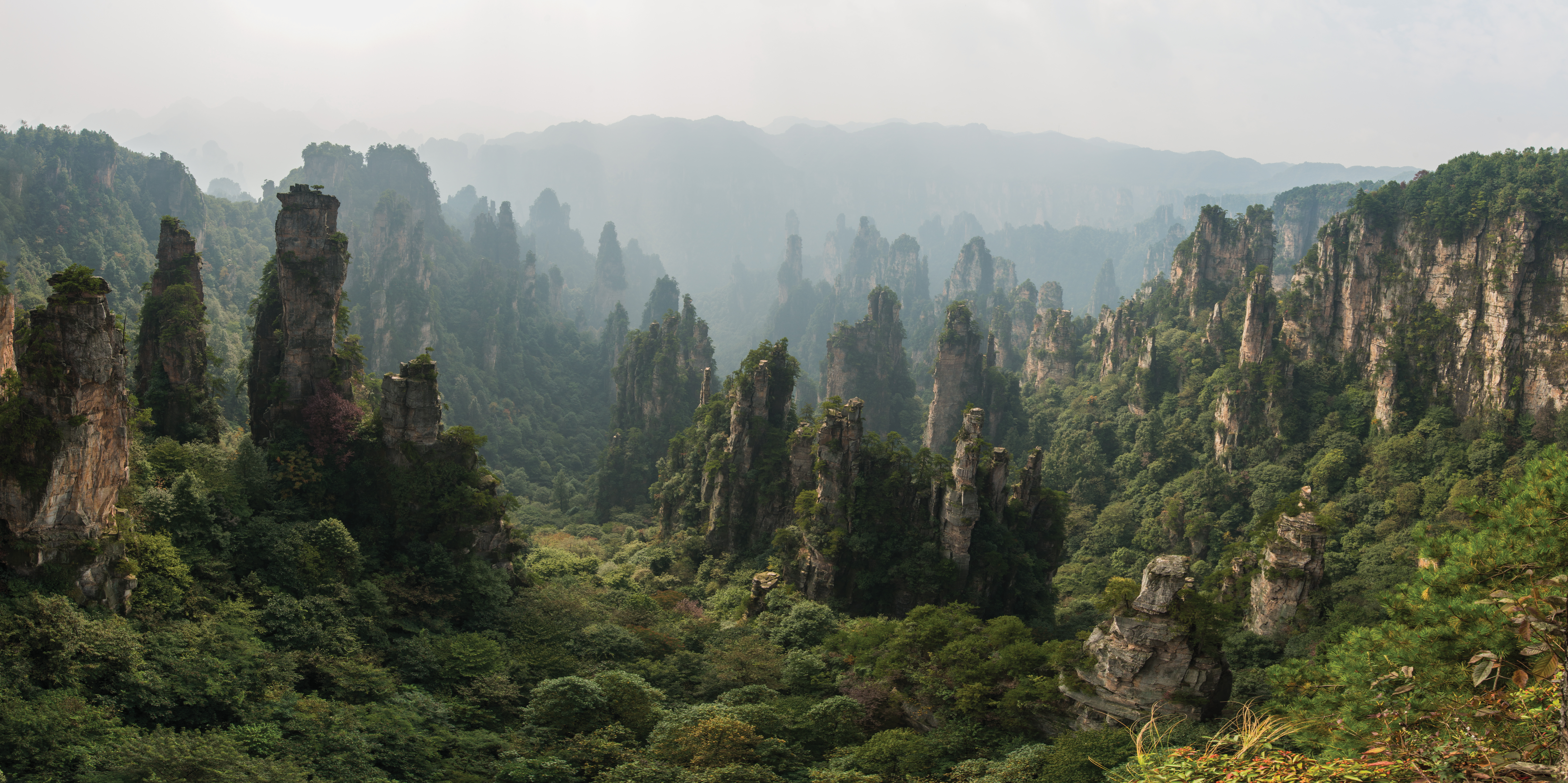
Above is the prototype of Luhua Pool, the Huanglong Scenic Area, and below is the prototype of Jueyun Karst, Zhangjiajie National Forest Park.

=== Geography ===
The game development team stated that Liyue was created with a Chinese fantasy theme. From white-box testing to art design, scene creation, it took a year to complete. Liyue officially opened on March 19, 2020, and its area is 1.5 times that of the initial region, Mondstadt. In the game, Liyue is located in the eastern part of the continent of Teyvat, bordered by Mondstadt to the northeast and facing Mt. Tianheng to the west. Liyue features diverse terrain, with sandstone formations being a prominent feature, symbolizing the Geo Archon's leadership. The area includes shallow beaches, plains crisscrossed by rivers, towering mountains, and stone forests. Plants in the mid-altitude areas are dominated by poplar trees, with locust and pine trees at higher altitudes, while bamboo, plum, and ginkgo trees grow in the plains and riverbanks. Animals include cranes and lizards that inhabit the cliffs.

The development team also focused on constructing Liyue's ecology, including climate, vegetation, and wildlife. As Liyue is themed around the Geo element, warm colors dominate the scenery. Players enter Liyue from Mondstadt through a stone gate designed based on karst arches based on those in southwest China, resembling a thin strip of sky in the early stages, later completing the final design by referencing ancient Chinese plank roads. After passing through, they arrive at the alluvial river of Bishui Plain, known as "Dihua Marsh", modeled after the landscape of Guilin and Yangshuo, characterized by continuous stone peaks, dense water networks, and floating vibrant flowers. The iconic building, Wangshu Inn, is inspired by the Lingnan Diaojiaolou architecture, with its temperament resembling the inn in the movie Dragon Inn. The scene in Dihua Marsh reproduces the characteristics of Guilin's multiple waters and continuous mountains, depicting the details to reflect the life of the people of Liyue. The northern "Qingce Village" showcases a tranquil village with numerous terraces and is inspired by the Longji Mountain and Rice Terraces.

The tributaries of Bishui River wind down from Dihua Marsh, eventually merging into "Luhua Pool", inspired by the iconic calc-sinter terraces of Huanglong Nature Reserve in Sichuan. The Huanglong Scenic Area is the only well-preserved plateau wetland in mainland China, and the production team believed that Huanglong possessed a sense of "dreaminess" and "mystery" beyond reality. Therefore, they chose Huanglong as a reference for Liyue's "ecosystem". The prototype of Liyue's Luhua Pool is located in Huanglong's Five-Color Pond. The water in Luhua Pool uses a different material from other water surfaces in the game, giving it attractive colors under various lighting conditions. Additionally, setting high points around Luhua Pool is aimed at allowing players to "more easily experience its perfect side."

Zhuhua Pool, located next to Mt. Tianheng, is inspired by the famous Tianmen Mountain in Zhangjiajie National Forest Park. Mt. Tianheng features the "Jueyun Karst", shrouded in clouds and mist year-round, with plank roads and suspension bridges between the peaks. This place is the retreat of the immortals who guard Liyue. Zhangjiajie was chosen as the model because its fantastical landscape seems "a bit out of this world." In the game, Jueyun Karst is the retreat of Liyue's immortals, and Zhangjiajie's towering mountains and misty atmosphere fit this setting perfectly in the developers' opinion. Additionally, the sandstone peak forest of Zhangjiajie aligns with Liyue's theme of the Geo element.

Passing through Mt. Tianheng, the player arrives at Liyue's southeastern commercial port, "Liyue Harbor". In the game, the entrance to Mt. Tianheng in Liyue Harbor is inspired by the Tianmen Cave in Tianmen Mountain. The development team believed that entering Mt. Tianheng and discovering Liyue Harbor would create a strong visual and spatial contrast, highlighting Liyue's natural and cultural heritage. Liyue Harbor's architecture is influenced by the ancient town of Fenghuang in Western Hunan and the Hanging Temple of Mount Heng in Northern Yue. The pailou-like entrance and bridge upon entering Liyue Harbor were designed to convey a sense of ceremony and solemnity.

A new expansion area of Liyue, "The Chasm", was released with the 2.6 version update on March 30, 2022. The Chasm features a complex terrain with many unique ecological and geological environments and borders Sumeru. It is divided into an upper and a lower region, and completing tasks will unlock the underground mine area, where players can use the item "Lumenstone Adjuvant" to explore this region. Another new area, "Chenyu Vale", was released with the 4.4 version update on January 31, 2024. It is located in the northwest region bordering Fontaine. The area "Qiaoying Village" is known for producing tea, and its architectural design takes inspiration in the Huizhou architecture in Huangshan, Anhui Province.

=== Adepti ===
The xianren (Chinese: 仙人; pinyin: xiānrén) or just xian (Chinese: 仙; pinyin: xiān), localized as "adepti" in English, are unique and central to the mythos of Liyue and are portrayed in Genshin Impact as divine or semi-divine beings who protect the region under the mandate of the Prime of the Adeptus, Rex Lapis.

In traditional Daoism and Chinese folklore, xianren are Daoist immortals who attain transcendence through discipline and cultivation, often retreating from the mortal world to dwell in sacred mountains. The locations where the adepti live are accordingly called dongtian (Chinese: 洞天; pinyin: dòngtiān; lit. 'cave heaven'), sacred Taoist sites. Of them, the player's home (called the "Serenitea Pot" in English) is named after the famous dongtian Luofu. However, while traditionally, all living beings can become xian, the developers purposefully deviated from traditional concepts of the xian by restricting the adeptus status to non-humans.

The game localizes the full title of the adepti as "mighty and illuminated", a translation of the term 三眼五显; sān yǎn wǔ xiǎn, which literally means "three eyes and five manifestations". This term is historically associated with Huaguang Tianwang, a Daoist protector deity featured in Journey to the South, a Ming-dynasty novel, and other late imperial Chinese supernatural literature.

=== Music and art ===
The original soundtrack of Liyue adopts the traditional Chinese pentatonic scale. The instrumentation blends traditional Chinese instruments such as the dizi, erhu, guzheng, and pipa with Western orchestral music, fusing folk music with symphony. The original music was composed by Yu-Peng Chen and performed by the Shanghai Symphony Orchestra, recorded in the Shanghai Symphony Hall over five days. Some of Liyue's character songs use modern musical styles, such as Qiqi's character song which uses a synthesizer, and Hu Tao's theme which imitates the style of 1990s Hong Kong zombie movies.

The scene art director stated that the game does not meticulously recreate the real-world prototypes but rather extracts elements and reconstructs them to present a form of moderate fantasy. During the production process, the team visited many scenic spots in China for inspiration. miHoYo's director and vice president of game operations, Yin Chunbo, mentioned that the team was initially worried that, as a private game company, their requests might be rejected by scenic areas. However, the Shanghai Municipal Party Committee's publicity department and the Shanghai Municipal Bureau of Culture and Tourism wrote recommendation letters for them.

== Setting ==
=== Culture ===
Liyue is the China-inspired region in Genshin Impact. It is located in the eastern part of Teyvat and is the oldest established nation on the planet. Liyue reflects many traditional Chinese cultural elements in its customs and traditions. This can be seen in the Oriental-inspired names across Liyue, which are preserved in the English version of the game through pinyin. The clothing worn by the characters also draws heavily from Chinese aesthetics; most non-playable characters wear outfits inspired by the fashion of the Qing dynasty, blended with some modern elements. Clothing can differ depending on the character's occupation and social class. For example, sailors and workers wear round-necked, double-breasted short shirts with leggings and wrist guards, while women mainly wear qipaos, large-collared shirts with long skirts, and short shirts with short skirts. As for playable characters, Zhongli's costume has the design of a magua and a changshan and Hu Tao's costume resembles a Tangzhuang. Her hat draws from those worn by officials during the Song and Ming dynasties. The storylines and dialogue related to Liyue uses many Chinese historical allusions and poems. Liyue's cuisine is intricate and diverse, represented by two main culinary traditions: "Li" and "Yue" cuisine, which parallel China's Eight Great Regional Cuisines. Most of the dishes featured in Liyue exist in real life or have real-life inspirations such as squirrel fish.

Liyue also features two major traditional festivals: the Lantern Rite and the Moonchase Festival, which correspond to the Chinese New Year, Lantern Festival and Mid-Autumn Festival in real life respectfully. The design of festival activities in the game also refers to traditional Chinese customs, such as fireworks, paper lanterns, lantern riddles, kites, and lion dances. During the Lantern Rite, on the first full moon night of the year, people release "Xiao Lanterns" and "Mingxiao Lanterns" into the night sky, and setting off fireworks is an indispensable activity for the people of Liyue. The Moonchase Festival celebrates the autumn season, with streets and buildings adorned with festive decorations, and some businesses setting up stalls and advertising to attract customers. Liyue's performing arts are modeled after Peking opera, and the developers even created an original opera piece entitled "Divine Damsel of Devastation", sung by opera performer Yang Yang. Finally, Liyue embodies Chinese xianxia traditions, with areas like Jueyun Karst and Chenyu Vale rich in lore about the adepti. Some playable characters are directly tied to this, such as Xiao, a yaksha with the goal of protecting the people.

=== Lore ===
Thousands of years before the game's events, an ancient civilization of Lang-Gan was established in the area that is now The Chasm as part of the unified civilization of Teyvat with Zibai serving as Celestia's divine envoy to Lang-Gan. During the War of Funerary Flame, 6000 years before the game's events, the Heavenly Principles cast down a Celestial Nail on Lang-Gan for the purpose of cleansing Abyssal corruption. Zibai, unwilling to leave her people to die, intervened to temporarily stop the Nail, allowing the inhabitants of Lang-Gan to escape. However, she died from her attempt to stop the Nail and Lang-Gan was ultimately destroyed; however, Istaroth, the Ruler of Time, managed to preserve her soul by freezing her in the moment of her death and imbuing the fragments of her shattered soul into her Three Deadly Selves while also creating the shadowmoon to preserve her soul. The impact of the Celestial Nail also led to the creation of The Chasm, with the remains of the Nail remaining deep underground as the Spiritstone.

After the war, Rex Lapis founded Liyue. The goddess Guizhong guarded Mt. Tianheng and built the Guizhong Ballista. She led miners to migrate north of Mt. Tianheng to develop agriculture. Around more than 3700 years before the events of the game, the Archon War broke out, leading to the desolation of Guili Plains and Guizhong's death. Salt Goddess Havria, who led the refugees to establish a sanctuary in Sal Terrae, was killed by her followers after she kept conceding her territory until all she left was the land now known as Sal Terrae. Consequently, Rex Lapis led the people to migrate south of Mt. Tianheng. The final battleground of the Archon War moved to the Guyun Stone Forest, where Rex Lapis killed a demon god and freed the enslaved Five Yakshas, making a contract with them.

Before the end of the Archon War, the adeptus Skybracer broke his antlers to support the damaged Mt. Tianheng, turning his blood into a river that formed Bishui Plain, submerging the ruins of Sal Terrae. The war ended around two thousand years ago, with Rex Lapis subduing the remaining demon gods at Guyun Stone Forest. The yakshas and adepti also cleansed the evil spirits left behind. At this time, only Xiao, the Golden-Winged Yaksha, remained among the Five Yakshas. Liyue's people turned to commerce, with the Liyue Qixing, representing seven commercial forces, governing the nation. The Millelith, an army of brave mortals under Rex Lapis, were formed. The adepti retreated to Jueyun Karst, and Rex Lapis oversaw Liyue's economy, establishing the Rite of Descension. Liyue Harbor began to take shape.

When the protagonist Traveler arrived, Rex Lapis took on the persona of "Zhongli" and staged his own death, escalating the conflict between the adepti and the Liyue Qixing, who were acting as interim rulers. During this chaos, the Fatui diplomat and harbinger Tartaglia, better known as "Childe", summoned the sealed demon god Osial, who launched a sudden attack on Liyue Harbor. With the help of the Liyue Qixing and the adepti, the Traveler fought against Osial and ultimately defeated him, with Ningguang suspending him in the air at the Jade Chamber before sealing him once again. Subsequently, Rex Lapis abdicated his position, and the Liyue Qixing took control of all authority in Liyue, marking the transition from a rule by gods and adepti to a rule by humans.

After the Frost Moon returns back to Teyvat, the shadowmoon loses the meaning for its existence and begins disintegrating bit-by-bit. It completely disappears during a contemporaneous Lantern Rite, releasing the fragment of Zibai's soul contained within. Zhongli, who had been awaiting a chance like this for thousands of years, and the Traveler reunite it with Zibai's other Deadly Selves and resurrect her.

== Influences ==
On the eve of the Spring Festival of 2022, Genshin Impact released a video of Liyue character Yun Jin's opera performance, "The Divine Damsel of Devastation", which garnered over 30 million views worldwide within a year. On October 9, 2022, Genshin Impact officially released the first film in the "Gourmet Tour: Liyue's Cuisine Collection" series, showcasing the production process of the famous dish "Slow-Cooked Bamboo Shoot Soup". This video received over 2 million views on Bilibili and YouTube on its first day. In the Spring Festival of 2023, the Genshin Impact team, in collaboration with Southern Weekly, launched a documentary series, "A Journey of Art and Heritage", focusing on traditional crafts such as printmaking and carving. Several documentary shorts showcasing the process of these artisans creating their works will also be released.

== Reception ==
The Ministry of Culture and Tourism of the People's Republic of China praised miHoYo on its official Weibo account for exploring a new model of cross-industry cooperation with "games + culture and tourism" in Genshin Impact. Liyue has also been praised by Xinmin Evening News and Shanghai Observer. Xinmin Evening News wrote that Liyue prominently showcases elements of traditional Chinese culture, allowing players to gradually discover traditional cultural elements such as opera, tea culture, chess, traditional medicine, and mechanical arts as they explore Liyue. Shanghai Observer praised Liyue for using cultural innovation to make traditional Chinese culture vibrant and lively.

Liyue serves as a type of "destination image" and inspires the appreciation of Chinese culture, encouraging travel from international players. Russian journalist Valiyev Samir believes there is a "Liyue Effect", as Liyue is a driver of tourism and a "meticulously crafted virtual homepage to Chinese civilization".

Game Grapes commented that Liyue gives the most direct impression through the transformation of its overall artistic style. Unlike Mondstadt's Euro-American fantasy and Japanese fantasy styles, Liyue is firmly set in the direction of Eastern fantasy. Game Gyro believes that Liyue's many elements allow global players to truly appreciate the beauty of Chinese culture. Since Liyue's place names and local products are named in Chinese, they have also attracted some non-Chinese players to study the pronunciation of Liyue's geography and products.

Polygon cited reviews stating that Liyue's design is completely different from Mondstadt, featuring more unique architecture, better background music, and more tightly integrated lore and stories. While blending East Asian cultural elements, it retains gameplay, expressiveness, and aesthetics suitable for players worldwide. Alan Wen from Eurogamer noted that Liyue "is clearly inspired by traditional Chinese culture and architecture." Kotaku editor Sisi Jiang felt that Liyue is an idealized portrayal of Chinese social relationships, where merchants and customers show care for each other through mutual benefit, and money can build interdependent relationships, unlike the current society where shopping habits are often disconnected from community.

== See also ==
- The Xianzhou Luofu, a location based on Ancient China from Honkai: Star Rail, another miHoYo video game
