= Pyo Yeong-jae =

South Korean voice actor

- Occupation: Voice actor

Korean name
- Hangul: 표영재
- Hanja: 表永宰
- RR: Pyo Yeongjae
- MR: P'yo Yŏngjae

Pyo Yeong-jae is a South Korean voice actor who joined the Munhwa Broadcasting Corporation's Voice Acting Division in 1999.

== Roles ==
=== Broadcast TV ===
- CSI: Miami (replacing Adam Rodriguez by Season 1 and Jonathan Togo by Season 3, Korea TV Edition, MBC)
- Dr. Slump (Korea TV Edition, MBC)
- Midnight Special (MBC)

==== Video game dubbing ====
- Samurai Warriors (Mitsuhide Akechi)
- The War of Genesis Mobile: Crow II
- League of Legends (Jhin, Varus)
- Genshin Impact (Zhongli)
- MapleStory (Male Kain, Gilmore, Tirag)
- Cookie Run: Kingdom (Red Velvet Cookie)
- Arknights (Phantom)
- Counter:Side (Gerard Curian)

=== Film dubbing ===
- The Fast and The Furious (replacing Rick Yune, Korea TV Edition, MBC)
- The Others (replacing Eric Sykes, Korea TV Edition, MBC)
- Star Wars (replacing Mark Hamill, Korea TV Edition, MBC) (Korean Re-Dub) (Original Korean voice: Bak Ki-ryang)

== See also ==
- Munhwa Broadcasting Corporation
- MBC Voice Acting Division
