= Zhongli (Genshin Impact) =

Fictional character in a video game

- Genshin Impact character
- First game: Genshin Impact (2020)
- Voiced by: EN: Keith Silverstein; ZH: Peng Bo; JA: Tomoaki Maeno; KO: Pyo Yeong-jae

In-universe information
- Aliases: Rex Lapis, Morax
- Weapon: Polearm
- Origin: Liyue
- Element: Geo

Zhongli (Chinese: 钟离; pinyin: Zhōnglí) is a character in the video game Genshin Impact, developed by miHoYo. In the game's lore, on the surface, he is a consultant for the Wangsheng Funeral Parlor in the fictional nation of Liyue, knowledgeable in funeral rites and responsible for assisting with funeral arrangements. In reality, he is also the Geo Archon Morax, the former ruler of Liyue and one of the seven deities who govern the nations of Teyvat, the game's world. Zhongli appears in the first chapter of the game's main storyline following its release in 2020. He would become a playable character later that year.

Zhongli's portrayal and themes of composure and dignity have received positive reviews from critics. However, during his initial release, Zhongli faced widespread criticism for his weak performance in combat. He only gained a more favorable reception after the developers significantly revised his design.

== Design and voice acting ==
Zhongli has dark brown hair with an orange gradient and golden eyes. His costume combines the elegance of the Western tuxedo with that of the Chinese changpao, creating a dynamic merge of the East and West that is neither obtrusive nor that of an elegant hermit. His coat is painted with patterns of loong (Chinese dragon) scales and fenghuang feathers. His outfit is also adorned with auspicious Fangsheng patterns (traditional patterns from the Han dynasty era composed of two rhombus horns overlapping each other) and silver-gray Chinese knotting. The outfit's main colors are black and brown, giving him a sense of stability and solemnity. The back of his suit is dominated by bright colors and a reworked Fangsheng pattern, and the waist is designed with an anagram to imply "wealth and nobility", giving the character a sense of nobility and agility at the same time. TheGamer theorized that his name may be derived from Zhongli Quan, one of the Eight Immortals of Taoism.

Zhongli is voiced by Keith Silverstein in English and Pyo Yeong-jae in Korean. His Chinese voice actor is Peng Bo. Zhongli's Japanese voice actor is Tomoaki Maeno. Maeno stated in an interview that during his first audition and the character design stage, the production team proposed that he play the role of Zhongli. He said that Zhongli's voice acting was initially serious and slow, but small details such as forgetting to bring his wallet in the game created a more carefree side of Zhongli. In another interview, Maeno described the character's more considerate side and how it was gradually revealed within the game, which he said displayed a sense of intimacy that was drastically different from the divine figure that some other characters see him as. Maeno stated that the balance between Zhongli's humanity and divinity and the ancient Chinese expressions was difficult to dub. However, he added that throughout the dubbing process, he gained a better understanding of Zhongli's mannerisms and the origins behind them.

== Appearances ==
=== Story ===
Zhongli is described as an employee of the Wangsheng Funeral Parlor, responsible for assisting in the preparation of its funerals. He is knowledgeable, elegant, and proficient in subjects and matters regarding Liyue. Despite having no money of his own, Zhongli spends lavishly in his daily life and often charges his expenses to either the Wangsheng Funeral Parlor or his friend Tartaglia, much to the frustration of the parlor's director, Hu Tao, and Tartaglia himself.

When the protagonist Traveler visits Liyue to meet the Geo Archon, they witness his apparent death and soon become suspected of causing it. Tartaglia saves the Traveler from arrest and advises them to seek help from Liyue's adepti to prove their innocence. Later, he introduces the Traveler to Zhongli, who agrees to help them approach Morax's remains. Zhongli first asks for the Traveler's help in organizing the funeral ceremony known as the "Rite of Parting" for Morax. During this time, the Traveler clears their name but realizes that Tartaglia has been manipulating events from behind the scenes, using them as a pawn to provoke conflict between Liyue's adepti and its leaders. They confront Tartaglia in the Golden House, where he attempts to uncover the Geo Archon's remains. Upon discovering that the body lacks a Gnosis, a divine object possessed by gods, Tartaglia realizes that Morax is actually alive. In a desperate move to draw him out, Tartaglia summons the ancient sea monster Osial, a god once defeated by Morax. With the combined efforts of the adepti, Liyue Qixing, and security forces, the Traveler helps subdue Osial; Morax, however, does not reappear. Afterward, when the Traveler seeks out Zhongli, they learn the truth: Zhongli is, in fact, Morax himself. He had faked his death to relinquish his rule over Liyue and transfer authority to its people. Zhongli also reveals that he had entered into a deal with the ruler of Snezhnaya and has surrendered his Gnosis as part of that agreement. He later joins all of Teyvat in protecting the world against the Nails of Retribution. (Note: The Nails of Retribution are giant nails hanging in the sky, created by Celestia, to combat deviations from a divine plan made by the Heavenly Principles, Teyvat's ruler.)

=== Gameplay ===
As a playable character, Zhongli is a five-star Geo polearm user. His elemental abilities include being able to summon a stone stele in front of him. A longer variant of this ability is able to create a Jade Shield to reduce the resistances of nearby targets, create a shield, and deal damage to opponents. His Elemental Burst has him summon a falling meteor from the sky, causing Geo damage and petrifying afflicted opponents.

== Promotion ==
Zhongli first appeared as a non-player character in version 1.0 of the game, appearing in the first chapter of the main storyline. miHoYo later announced in the version 1.1 preview trailer that Zhongli would become a playable character, releasing a character trailer for him on November 22, 2020, and showcasing his gameplay with a character demo a week later. He debuted as a playable character in version 1.1 on December 1, 2020, alongside a dedicated weapon, the "Vortex Vanquisher." miHoYo also launched a two-part Story Quest dedicated to Zhongli so players could learn more about him, with the second part coming out alongside version 1.5 on April 28, 2021.

On December 18, 2023, Genshin Impact released the promotional teaser titled "Gazing Up at Eternity, Looking Down at the World" in collaboration with the Sanxingdui Museum, as well as the creative cultural relics commentary video "Antiquities Experience" and the interactive web page "Ancient Treasures Unearthed". The online activities are themed around Zhongli's dream in perusing and naming Sanxingdui bronzes, with the hints offered by the character introducing and promoting the cultural relics at Sanxingdui. After the video was released, the topic of joint conversation quickly became trending on search results. As of February 4, 2026, the collaboration teaser "Gazing Up at Eternity, Looking Down at the World" has been viewed more than 2 million times on Bilibili. Related activities also include offline check-ins to receive gifts within Genshin Impact. A bronze statue of Zhongli was also displayed at the Sanxingdui Museum for visitors to take pictures of.

== Reception ==
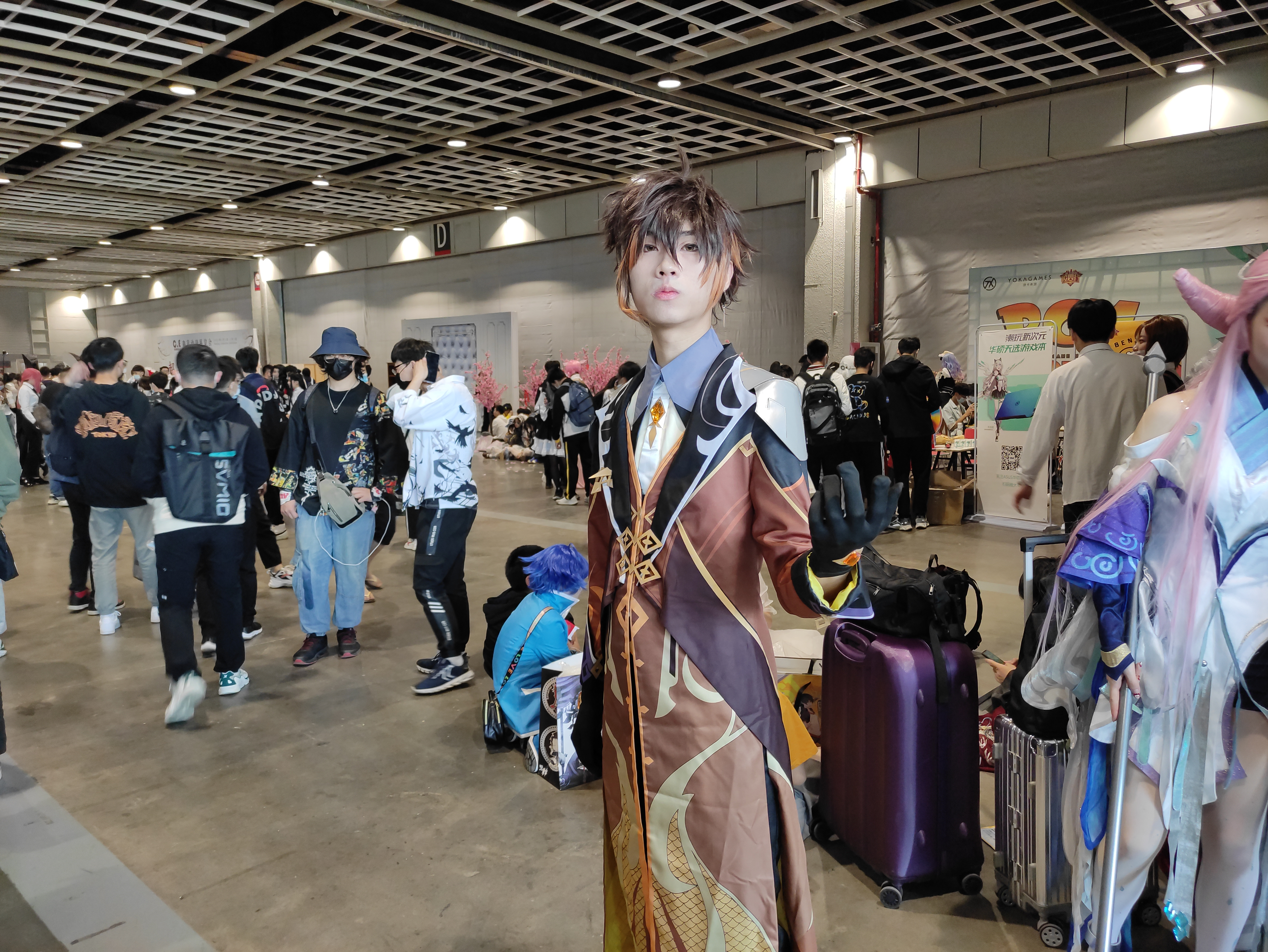
A cosplay of Zhongli

Jessica Clark Dillon, a reviewer at TheGamer, compared Zhongli's character design to other characters within the game, arguing that his detached exterior design, such as his brown suit and accessories, made him stand out among the rest of the cast. Dillon's article also highlighted the anticipation of the "Archon War" costume, which was yet to be released at the time. In addition, Zhongli's suit design blends Chinese and Western cultures with a tuxedo design in the upper portion and the utilization of traditional Chinese symbols reflecting his rigorous and cheerful personality. One study commented that Zhongli showed "remarkable" imperial constitution. It also mentions his idle animations and posture, exhibiting more relaxed and docile traits such as crossing his arms over his chest or resting his chin on his hands, which subtly showcased the tranquility the character maintains, even under dire circumstances. In terms of his movement design during active combat, Zhongli's movements were designed to be sharp, crisp and full of impact. Combined with the movement of his flowing clothes, the study says that he creates a visual effect that were comparable to that of flowing clouds, which displayed both his martial prowess and the artistic aspects behind them.

Meng Ziyun and Deng Guiying wrote in News Tide that Zhongli is not only the deity of Liyue but also plays an important role in the game's story, having founded the nation of Liyue and lead them to prosperity. In another study, Wang Qingshuang praised Zhongli's characterization and backstory as being deeply rooted in Chinese culture, noting that his age and mythological background parallel that of Fuxi from ancient Chinese texts. Wang, Meng and Deng all pointed out that in Zhongli's character promotion video, his chivalrous spirit and compassion for humanity are reflected in the dialogue. They believe that these qualities also reflect the ideal gentlemanly personality in traditional Chinese culture and the core Confucian value of ren (benevolence).

Since his release as a playable character, Zhongli has enjoyed critical acclaim and popularity from players and fans of Genshin Impact. A study in Intercultural Communication Studies analyzed how Zhongli's character has also resonated greatly with audiences outside of China. Overseas players have expressed deep appreciation for Zhongli's elegant demeanor and cultural design. His appearance and behavior combine the grace of traditional Chinese aesthetics with elements of Western style, creating a fusion that appeals to international audiences. Zhongli's refined, scholarly persona contrasts sharply with the muscular male archetypes common in video games, sparking international interest in him. Beyond his outward appearance, Zhongli's intellectual temperament, devotion to contracts, and deep patriotism have also earned global admiration. His erudition, cultured manner of speech and subtle details of daily life have led overseas fans to regard him as the image of the "ideal Chinese gentleman." Players were particularly struck by his unwavering respect for contracts and promises, as well as his fatherly devotion and wisdom toward the people of Liyue — traits that shaped his image as both a doting father and wise leader.

Jiang also criticized the English dubbing for Zhongli, arguing that Silverstein's portrayal of the character diverges sharply from the original Chinese. She wrote that in the Chinese version, Zhongli sounds like a gentle and caring father figure, while in English he comes across as stern and gruff. Jiang suggested that this tonal difference contributed to controversy and that the attempt to emphasize "traditional masculinity" for Western audiences was outdated and unappealing. PCGamesN writer Dustin Bailey called Zhongli a "sexyboy husbando".

One Esports has described his character trailer's popularity as being due to many players going back to watch Zhongli's demo whenever miHoYo releases a new character trailer. According to Sensor Tower, along with other characters released in tandem, Zhongli set a new record with US$15.5 million in revenue in a single day when he was first launched. His banner with Ganyu also became one of the highest-grossing banners in the game's history. (Note: In Genshin Impact and other gacha games, a banner is the game's limited-time gacha event where players spend in-game currency (and sometimes real-world money) for the chance to get certain exclusive characters and weapons. For most characters, it is impossible to get them outside of their banners.)

Chinese swimmer Pan Zhanle, who won gold in the 100 metre freestyle at the 2024 Summer Olympics, derived his Weibo account description from one of Zhongli's quotes from his character demo.

=== Character gameplay ===
Zhongli's combat capabilities have evolved significantly over the course of Genshin Impact's history. Before Version 1.1's release, many players and media outlets had high expectations for the character's strength and abilities. However, after the version's release, players found that Zhongli's gameplay primarily revolved around his defensive capabilities. Siliconera's Jenni Lada was dissatisfied with his offensive capabilities. Players in China made memes calling the character weak and underpowered; in reaction to this, TheGamer's Andrea Shearon wrote that "the ball is in miHoYo's court" in regards to upgrading his gameplay abilities. Eventually, miHoYo issued a statement acknowledging the complaints players had with Zhongli's release. Subsequently, his overall strength was buffed in both Version 1.3 and 1.5 of the game.

Eurogamer reviewer Jessica Orr praised Zhongli as one of the strongest five-star characters, with the most practical support abilities in the game. TheGamer writers Sanyam Jain and Vanessa Esguerra praised the supportive and offensive capabilities of the character, emphasizing the durability of his Jade Shield and the healing his sixth Constellation unlocks. PCGamesN commentator Christian Vaz praised Zhongli as a strong character in both dealing damage and his supportive capabilities. Screen Rant commentator Lina Hassen praised Zhongli as the strongest Geo element character in the game as well as one of the strongest supportive characters; she further stated that Zhongli has both strong combat abilities and shields, allowing players to engage in combat with less risk.
