= Hu Tao =

Fictional video game character

- Genshin Impact character
- First game: Genshin Impact (2021)
- Voiced by: EN: Brianna Knickerbocker; ZH: Tao Dian; JA: Rie Takahashi; KO: Kim Ha-ru

In-universe information
- Weapon: Polearm
- Origin: Liyue
- Element: Pyro

Hu Tao (Chinese: 胡桃; pinyin: Hú Táo; lit. 'Walnut') is a character from Genshin Impact, a 2020 action role-playing gacha game developed by miHoYo. She is voiced by Tao Dian in Chinese, Brianna Knickerbocker in English, Rie Takahashi in Japanese, and Kim Ha-ru in Korean. In the game, she serves as the 77th Director of the Wangsheng Funeral Parlor within the China-like nation of Liyue. She made her debut as a playable character within the second phase of version 1.3 of the game on March 2, 2021. Her release had a significant impact on the game's sales. Hu Tao was generally received positively, and was praised for her strong gameplay, distinct goth-cute aesthetic, and eccentric personality.

== Voice acting ==
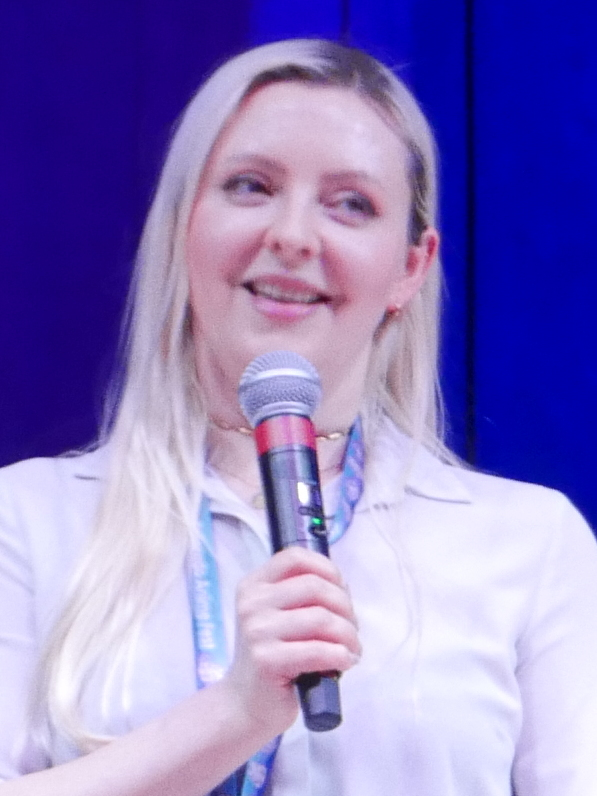
Brianna Knickerbocker, Hu Tao's English voice actress

She is voiced in Chinese by Tao Dian, in English by Brianna Knickerbocker, in Japanese by Rie Takahashi, and in Korean by Kim Ha-ru. Dian described Hu Tao as a "creepy and cute" girl. After getting to know the character in depth, she found that Hu Tao, while being mature and strong internally, maintains the innocent and cheerful nature of a child. On the surface, she often makes light of subjects regarding life and death, but secretly has a more genuine and thorough understanding of them, treating the matters with sincerity and respect. Takahashi expressed surprise at the complexity of the character when she received background information regarding her. At the recording site, she was further surprised when directed to "make Hu Tao weird", as she had interpreted the character as having more of a tricky personality.

== Appearances ==
Hu Tao serves as the 77th Director of the Wangsheng Funeral Parlor, although she often goes on breaks during the weekends. Most of the time, she is shown to have a livelier and active side to her, often pulling pranks on other characters, but she takes her job seriously. She has the ability to see ghosts and employs Zhongli as a consultant for the funeral parlor. In the early days of Hu Tao's management of the Parlor, she was questioned by the other undertakers because she was only thirteen at the time. Her leadership would be up to the highest caliber and increasing prestige, satisfying the other undertakers within. She spends her free time writing poetry and is considered a local celebrity for it. She often travels to accumulate materials and inspiration for her poetry.

After the update of version 1.3 of Genshin Impact, players can obtain Hu Tao through the game's gacha system. She is a five-star Pyro character. She was designed to be a primarily offensive character with good damage output. Hu Tao differs from most other offense-based characters in that she consumes her own health points to convert attack damage into Pyro elemental attacks and increase damage. Her Elemental Burst consists of a ranged attack which partially restores her own health if it hits a target. When her health is less than or equal to around half, the damage and healing amount caused by her Elemental Burst is increased.

In gameplay, Hu Tao possesses the Pyro element and wields a polearm as her primary weapon. Her skills require sacrificing health to increase damage output, requiring the player to manage her health and utilize abilities from other characters.

== Promotion ==
In the weeks following the initial release of Genshin Impact in September 2020, some players discovered unreleased characters within the game files, with Hu Tao among them. This resulted in leaks that the character would be officially launched in version 1.3 of the game in early 2021, but Hu Tao went without mention in the version 1.3 preview video released by miHoYo. In March 2021, miHoYo announced that Hu Tao would be released in the second phase of version 1.3 alongside her dedicated Story Quest chapter, "Papilio Charontis". On February 27, miHoYo released a character preview video for her which revealed her job title as a funeral director and some of her relationships. Hu Tao's skills and gameplay were showcased in the character demo video released on March 1, with both the announcement and demo displaying her playful personality.

On August 9, 2022, Chinese electronics manufacturer OnePlus announced a limited edition variant of the OnePlus Ace Pro featuring the character. In addition, a popular fan-made preset outfit based on the character would later be implemented in the action role-playing game Tower of Fantasy.

== Reception ==
Hu Tao was well-received upon release, with players creating many fan-works as a result. Sisi Jiang of Kotaku acknowledged that her gameplay was a significant factor, and attributed some of her popularity to "her cute goth appearance and eccentric personality". She also wrote that Hu Tao dealt high amounts of damage and believed she was the strongest character in the game until that point. In an analysis regarding the character's popularity, Game Grape editor "Nine-Lotus Lantern" stated that it came primarily from her setting and role within the story. He noted how the character appeals to the values and actions that younger demographics yearn for. In a study on Genshin Impact characters published in a Chinese journal on science and technology, scholar Tang Wenqian stated that Hu Tao and Zhongli are representative figures of Liyue, and that their character designs are rich in "Chinese elements". He added that he believes Hu Tao's personality conveys the Chinese people's view on life and death. Jenni Lada of Siliconera praised her personality as rewarding, stating that she stood out among several other characters because Hu Tao had noticeable imperfections in her personality. She also briefly complimented Hu Tao's business practices, saying that she offers coupons for adventurers seeking the funeral parlor's job. She compared Hu Tao's in-game cooking ability to those of other characters as well, writing that her ability to occasionally produce a "suspicious" dish stood out compared to characters who have a chance to produce an extra copy of a dish.

Her trailer exceeded one million views on YouTube within seven hours of release. On the day that Hu Tao's banner was launched, it brought in a revenue of 12.9 million USD to miHoYo. Her banner with Yelan during version 3.4 would also go on to set a record-high in revenue by March 1, 2023.

In January 2023, as part of the game's annual "Lantern Rite" event, Hu Tao delivered a rap performance that garnered negative reaction from both fans and media outlets, with some suggesting that the character should keep this to herself. Tyler Colp, writing for PC Gamer, observed that some critics likened the performance to that of streamer Mori Calliope, citing similarities in perceived low quality. Colp also pointed out a possible localization issue, noting that the English dub seemed to force the characters to "adhere to anime stereotypes", thereby stripping away some of the nuances present in the original Chinese — a matter "which has been a constant point of contention for fans". On the other hand, Tilly Lawton, in an article for Pocket Tactics, argued that all versions of the rap performance outside the Chinese rendition were noticeably subpar. Lawton further argued that some of the disappointment was because many fans had been "looking forward to our fave ghosty gal getting a rare moment to shine."
