= Wulingyuan =

Scenic and historic site in Hunan Province, China

UNESCO World Heritage Site
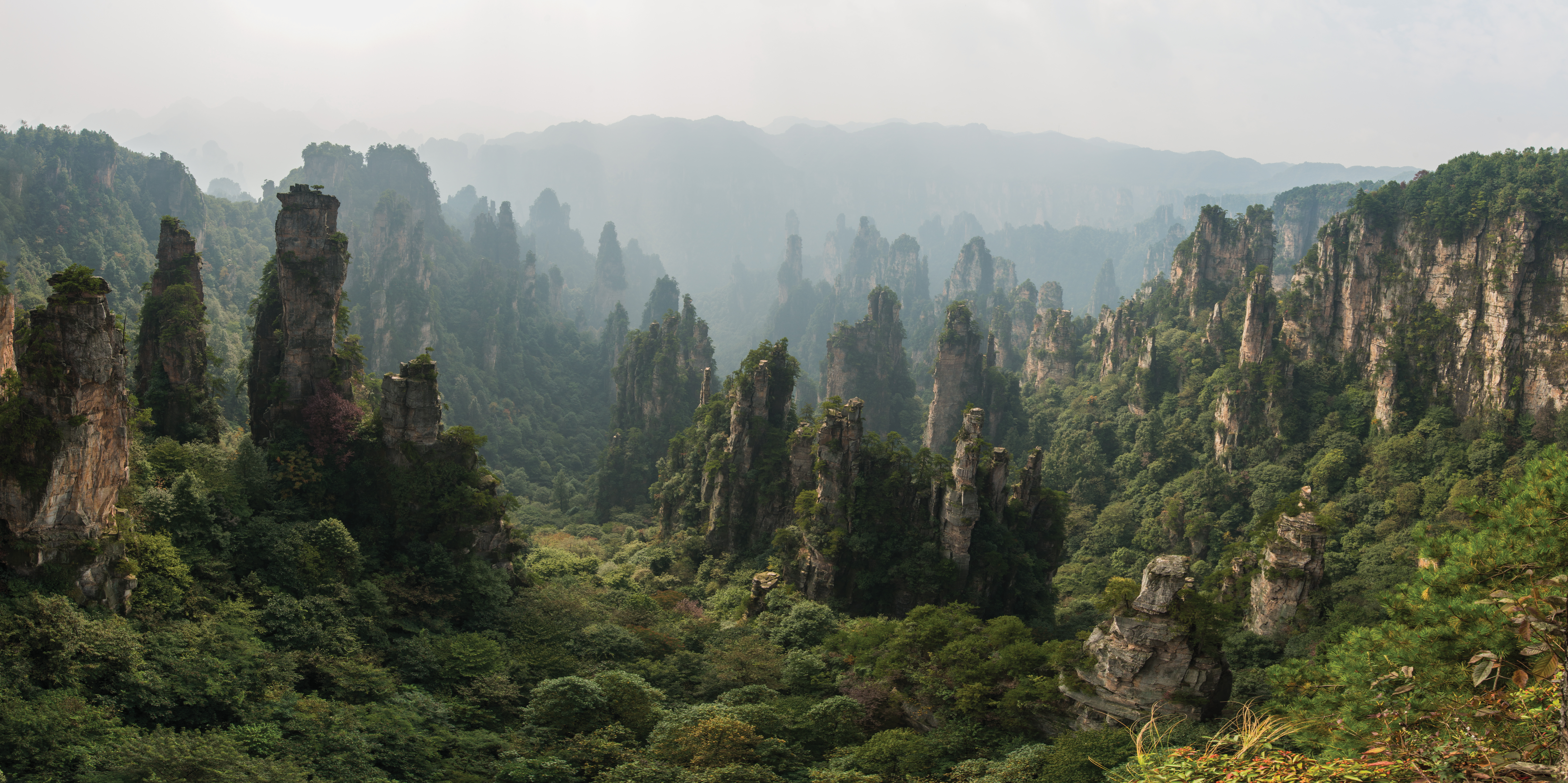
- The sandstone pillars of Wulingyuan extend hundreds of meters over the valley floor

- Location within Hunan Location within China
- Official name: Wulingyuan Scenic and Historic Interest Area
- Location: Wulingyuan District, Zhangjiajie, Hunan, China
- Criteria: Natural: (vii)
- Reference: 640
- Inscription: 1992 (16th Session)
- Area: 26,400 ha (102 sq mi)
- Coordinates: 29°20′N 110°30′E

Wulingyuan
- "Wulingyuan" in Chinese characters
- Chinese: 武陵源
Transcriptions
Standard Mandarin
- Hanyu Pinyin: Wǔlíngyuán
- Wade–Giles: Wu^{3}-ling^{2}-yüan^{2}
- IPA: [ù.lǐŋ.ɥɛ̌n]
Yue: Cantonese
- Yale Romanization: Móuh-lìhng-yùhn
- Jyutping: Mou5-ling4-jyun
Southern Min
- Tâi-lô: Bú-lîng-guân

Wulingyuan ([ù.lǐŋ.ɥɛ̌n], Chinese: 武陵源) is a scenic and historical site in the Wulingyuan District of South Central China's Hunan Province. It is noted for more than 3,000 quartzite sandstone pillars and peaks across most of the site, many over 200 metres (660 ft) in height, along with many ravines and gorges with picturesque streams, pools, lakes, rivers, and waterfalls. It features 40 caves, many with large calcite deposits and a natural bridge named Tianqiaoshengkong (meaning 'bridge across the sky'), which is one of the highest natural bridges in the world. The site also provides habitat for many vulnerable species, including the dhole, Asiatic black bear, and Chinese water deer.

The site is situated in Zhangjiajie City and lies about 270 kilometres (170 mi) to the northwest of Changsha, the capital of Hunan Province. The park covers an area of 690 square kilometers (266 square miles). Wulingyuan forms part of the Wuling Mountain Range. The scenic area consists of four national parks, which are the Zhangjiajie National Forest Park, Suoxi Valley Nature Reserve, Tianzi Mountain Nature Reserve, and the recently added Yangjiajie Scenic Area. Overall there are over 560 attraction sights to view. The site was inscribed as a UNESCO World Heritage Site in 1992.

== Geology ==
The quartzite sandstone pillars and the surrounding regions were formed during the Devonian period (400 to 350 million years ago) from a combination of tectonic uplift and water erosion. The highest area in the park is Huang Shi Zhai (黃石寨). It reaches a height of 3,450 feet (1,050 m) and is accessible via cable car or a set of stairs. Another cliff can be accessed by the 326 m (1,070 ft) Bailong Elevator.

== Gallery ==
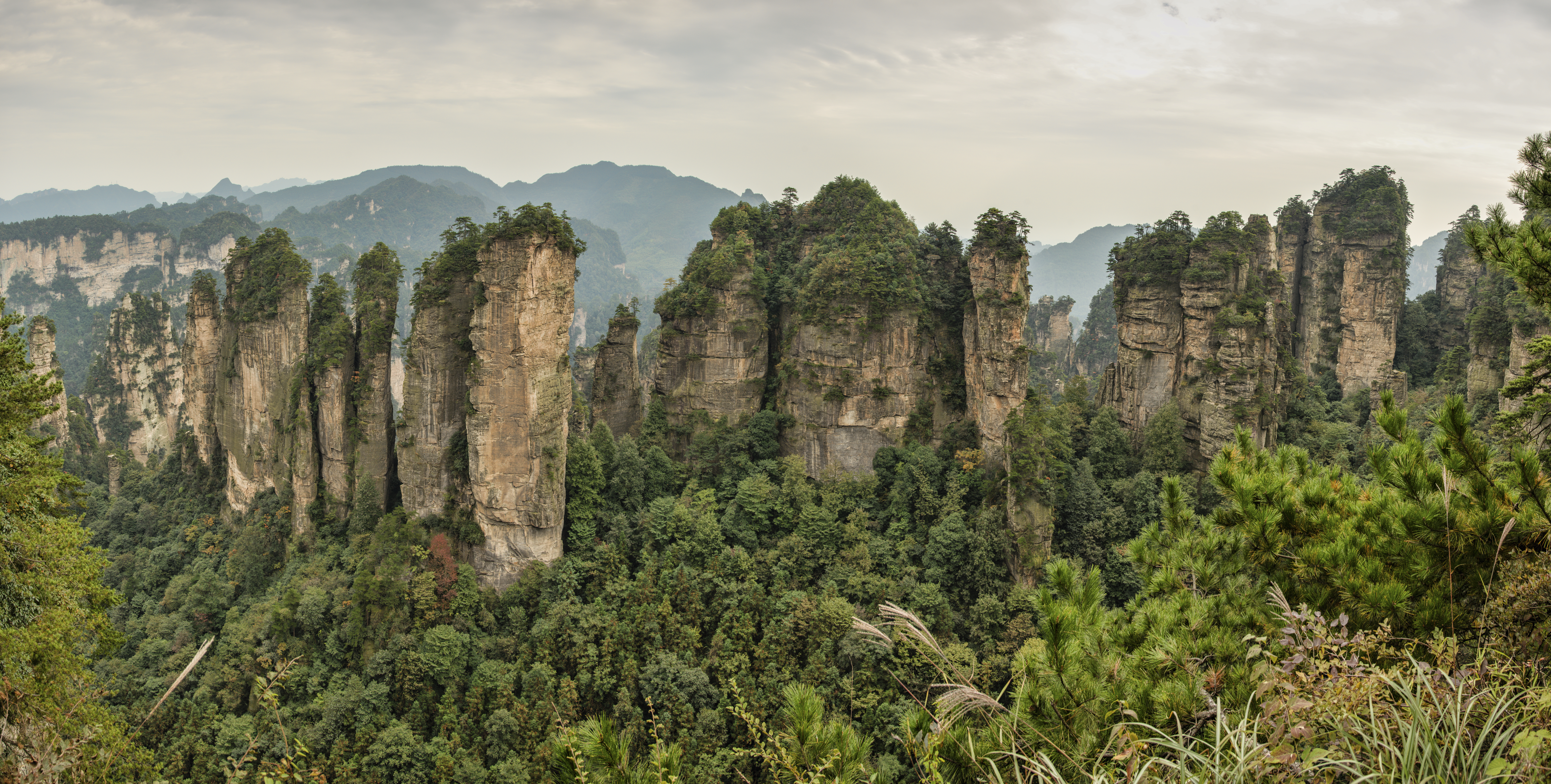
Panorama of the Five Fingers Peak of Huangshizhai

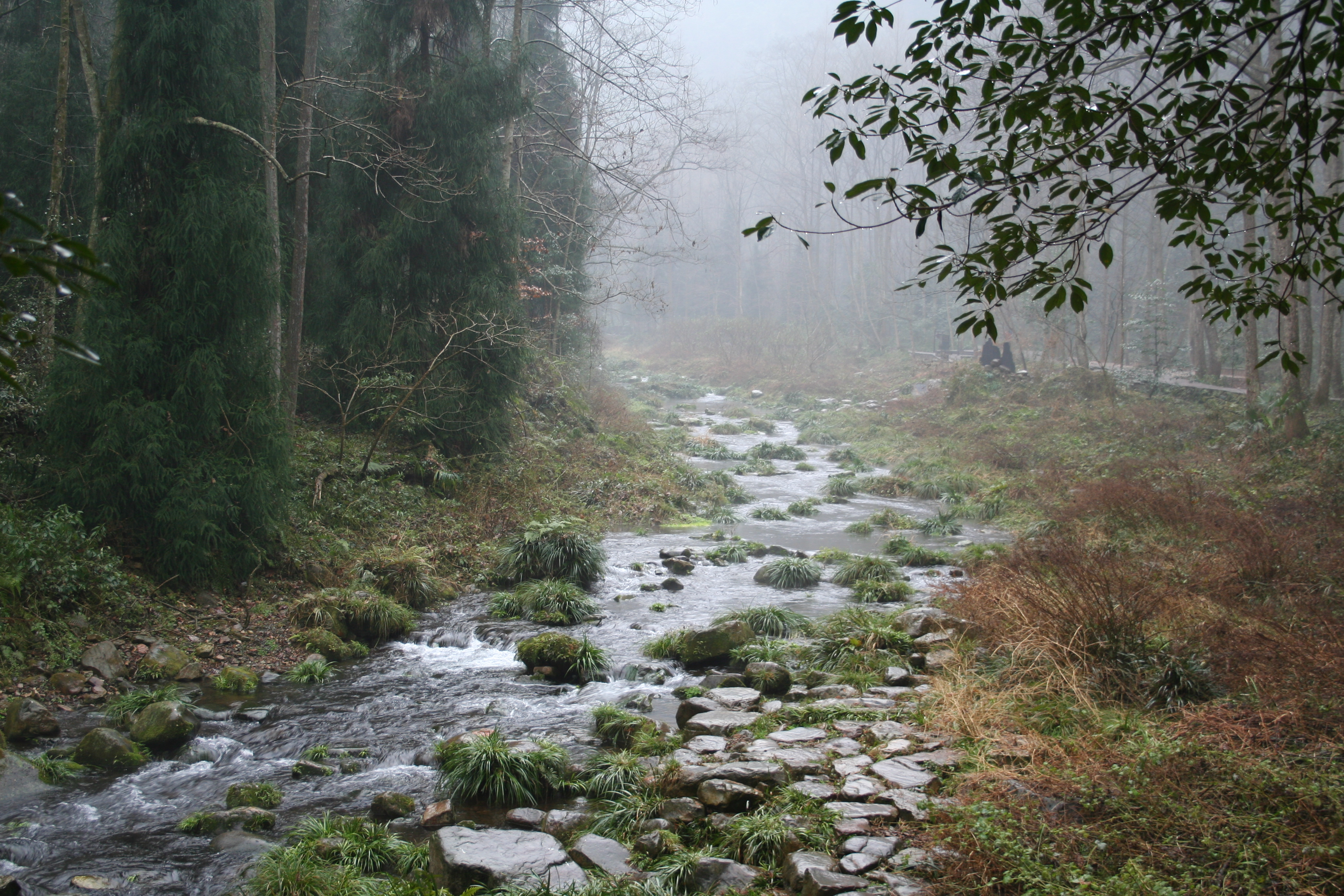
Zhangjiajie River

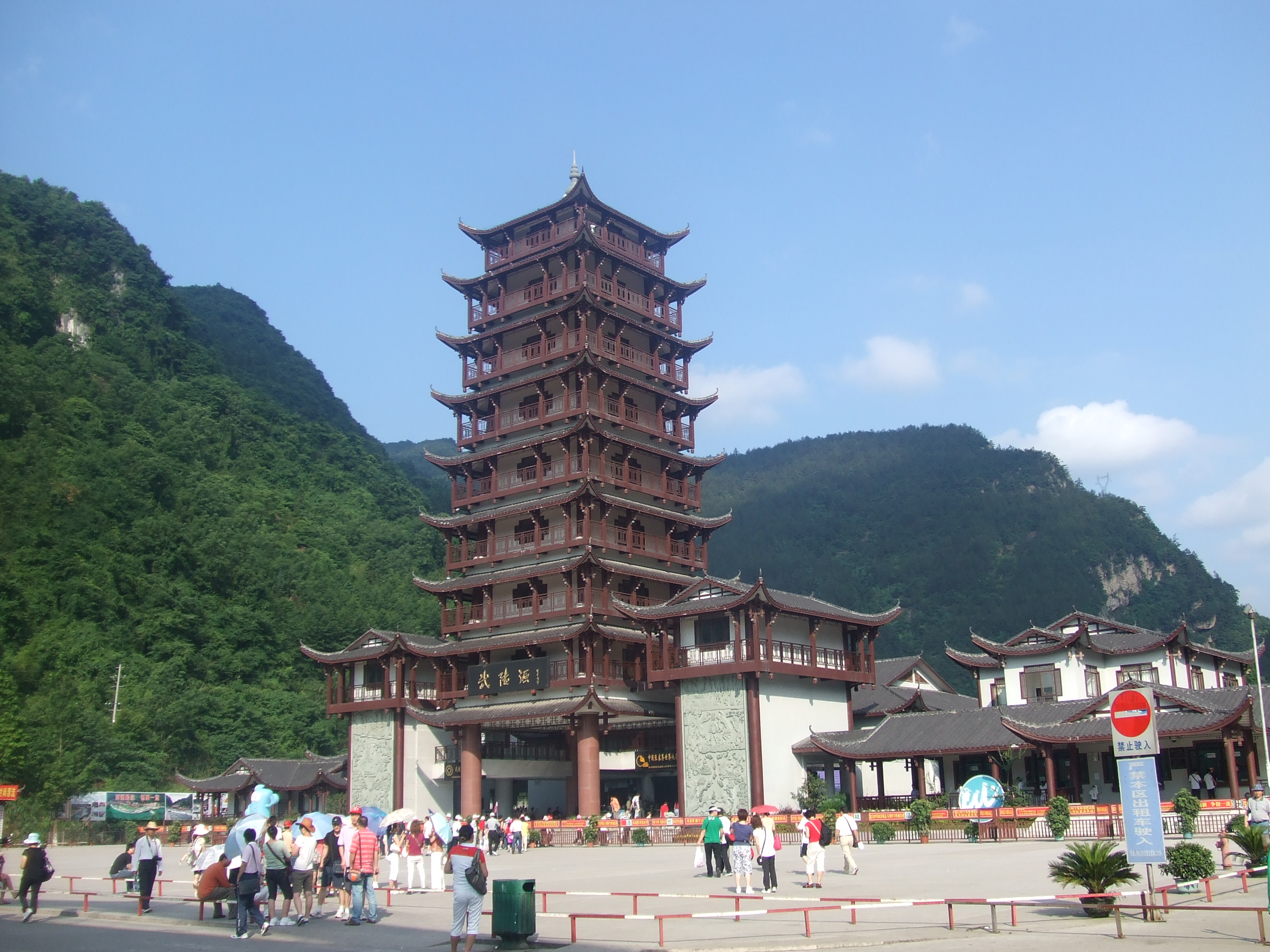
Wulingyuan park entrance
