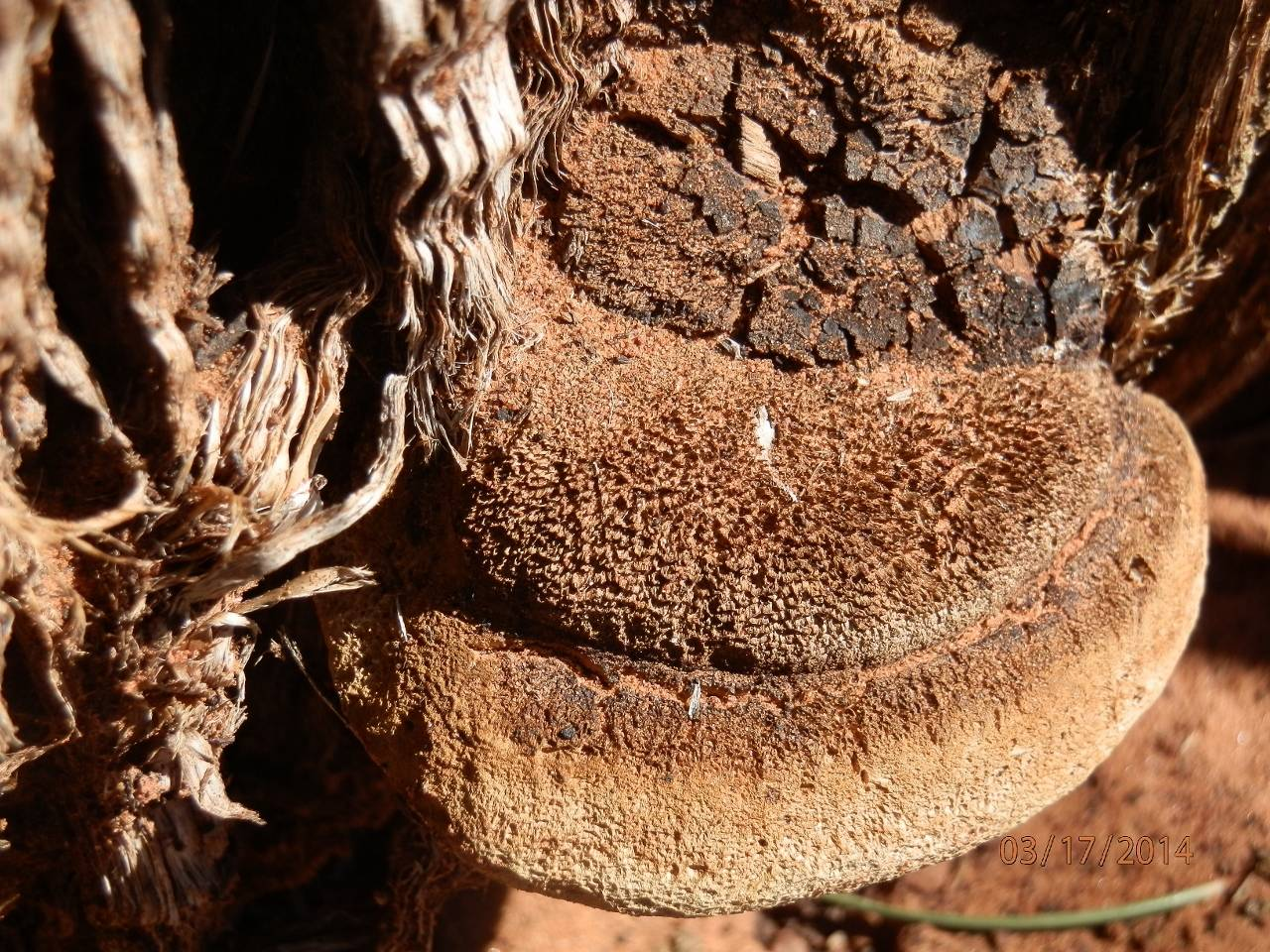
- Pyrofomes demidoffii

Scientific classification
- Kingdom: Fungi
- Division: Basidiomycota
- Class: Agaricomycetes
- Order: Polyporales
- Family: Polyporaceae
- Genus: Pyrofomes; Kotl. & Pouzar (1964)

Type species
- Pyrofomes demidoffii (Lév.) Kotl. & Pouzar (1964)

Species
- P. albomarginatus P. castanopsidis P. demidoffii P. fulvoumbrinus P. juniperinus P. lateritius P. perlevis P. tricolor

= Pyrofomes =

Genus of fungi

Pyrofomes is a genus of fungi in the family Polyporaceae. The genus was circumscribed by Czech mycologists František Kotlaba and Zdenek Pouzar in 1964. The type species, Pyrofomes demidoffii, was once considered a widespread species with a distribution that included East Africa, Middle Asia, Europe, and North America. DNA evidence demonstrated that North American collections represented a lineage that was different than European collections. The North American sibling was reinstated as P. juniperinus in 2017.

== Ecology ==
Pyrofomes, a type of brown rot fungi, plays a crucial role in forest ecosystems by decomposing persistent lignin, releasing trapped nutrients to fuel new plant growth. Without the activity of lignin decomposers like Pyrofomes, an essential aspect of the nutrient cycle would be hindered, potentially reducing ecosystem productivity.

== Species ==
The following species are assigned to Pyrofomes:

- Pyrofomes albomarginatus (Zipp. ex Lév.) Ryvarden (1972)
- Pyrofomes castanopsidis B.K.Cui & Y.C.Dai (2011)
- Pyrofomes demidoffii (Lév.) Kotl. & Pouzar (1964)
- Pyrofomes fulvoumbrinus (Bres.) A.David & Rajchenb. (1985)
- Pyrofomes juniperinus (H.Schrenk) Vlasák & Spirin (2017)
- Pyrofomes lateritius (Cooke) Ryvarden (1972)
- Pyrofomes perlevis (Lloyd) Ryvarden (1972)
- Pyrofomes tricolor (Murrill) Ryvarden (1972)
