= Bailong Elevator =

Double-deck elevator in Zhangjiajie, China

Coordinates: 29.3515°N 110.4615°E

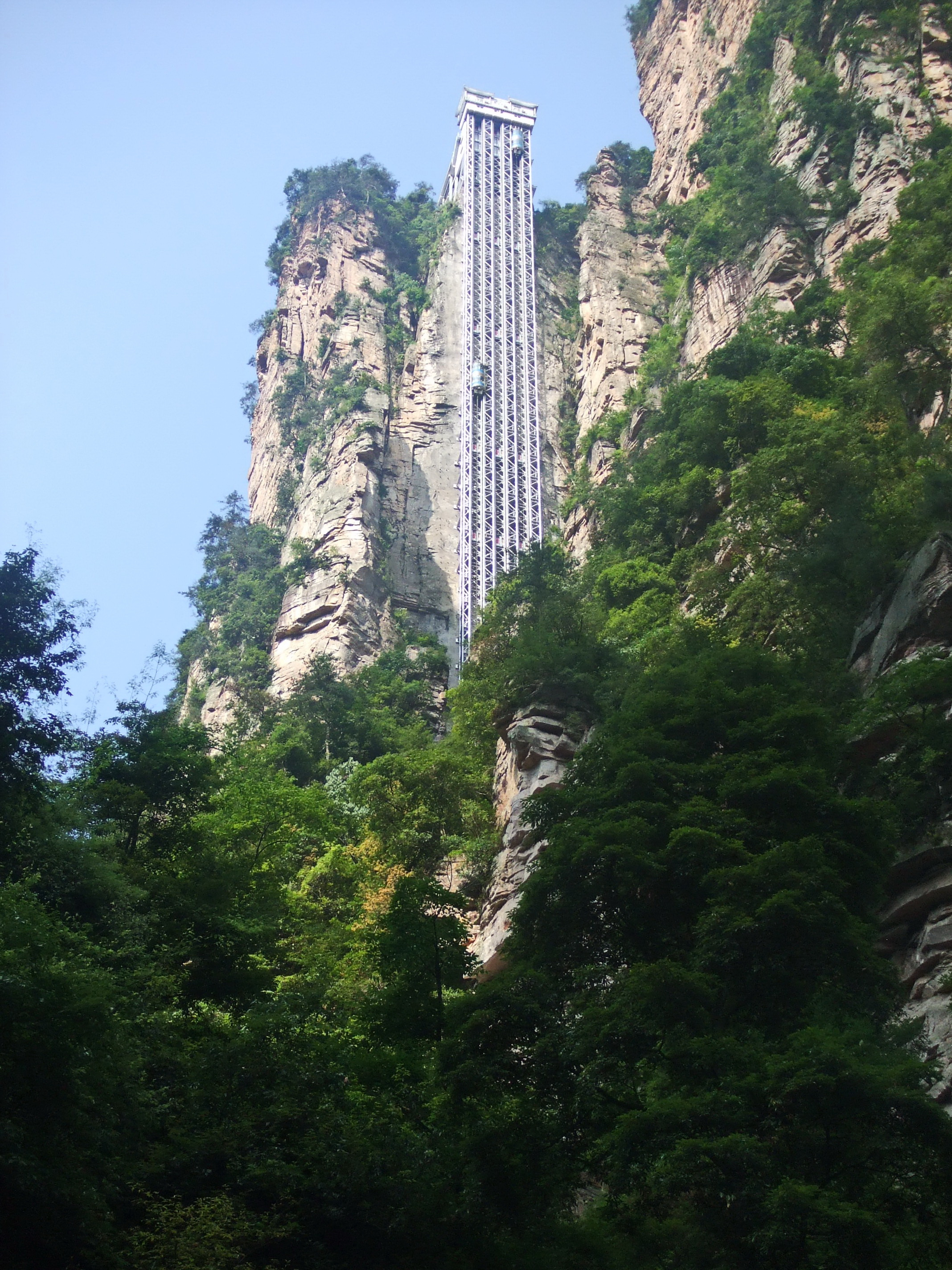
The Bailong Elevator, 2009

The Bailong Elevator (Chinese: 百龙天梯; lit. Hundred Dragons Heaven Elevator) is a glass double-deck elevator built onto the side of a cliff in the Wulingyuan area of Zhangjiajie, China, an area noted for more than 3,000 quartzite sandstone pillars and peaks across most of the site, many over 200 metres (660 ft) in height.

In order to ascend to the top of one such pillar without a two-hour hike, the elevator ascends 326 m (1,070 ft) in just one minute and 32 seconds, after a 2015 upgrade. It was recognised by Guinness World Records as the world's tallest outdoor elevator on 16 July 2015 and is purported to be the fastest passenger elevator with the largest loading capacity.

Construction of the elevator began in October 1999, and it was opened to the public by 2002. The elevator was built into the quartz sandstone cliff face, with the lower 505 feet embedded inside the mountain wall, and the upper 565 feet consisting of exposed steel derrick.

The environmental effects of the elevator have been a subject of debate and controversy, as the Wulingyuan area was designated a World Heritage Site in 2002. Operations were stopped for 10 months in 2002–2003, reportedly due to safety concerns, not environmental ones, because of its location in an earthquake-prone area.

== See also ==
- Hammetschwand Elevator
- List of towers
