= List of Magia Record episodes =

Magia Record: Puella Magi Madoka Magica Side Story
- The cover of the first Madoka Magica home media release volume, featuring Iroha Tamaki and Yachiyo Nanami.
- Native name
- Kanji: マギアレコード 魔法少女まどか☆マギカ外伝
- Revised Hepburn: Magia Rekōdo: Mahō Shōjo Madoka☆Magika Gaiden
- No. of episodes: 25 + 1 special

Release
- Original network: Tokyo MX, GYT, GTV, BS11, MBS, AT-X
- Original release: January 5, 2020 – April 3, 2022

Magia Record: Puella Magi Madoka Magica Side Story (Japanese: マギアレコード 魔法少女まどか☆マギカ外伝, Hepburn: Magia Rekōdo: Mahō Shōjo Madoka☆Magika Gaiden) is an anime series produced by Shaft based on a Japanese role-playing mobile game of the same name. The game and the anime series is a spin-off of the 2011 anime series Puella Magi Madoka Magica, and features a new protagonist named Iroha Tamaki, who arrives in Kamihama City to search for her missing sister.

The first season originally aired from January 5 to March 29, 2020, roughly covering the first half of the first arc of the Magia Record video game. The second season, titled The Eve of Awakening, aired from August 1 to September 26, 2021. The third and final season, titled Dawn of a Shallow Dream, aired in its entirety on April 3, 2022.

The first season is chief directed by Doroinu of Gekidan Inu Curry and has Yukihiro Miyamoto, series director of the original Madoka Magica, as assistant director. Miyamoto, alongside Kenjirou Okada and Midori Yoshizawa, rotated as directors across the first season (not episode directors). Akiyuki Shinbo is the animation supervisor, Junichirou Taniguchi is the character designer, and Takumi Ozawa composed the music. Taniguchi, Hiroki Yamamura (Shaft), and Nobuhiro Sugiyama (Shaft) are the chief animation directors. Yoshiaki Itou (Shaft), Akihisa Takano (Shaft), and Kana Miyai are the main animators. Episode 6 of the season was outsourced to CloverWorks. (Note: CloverWorks credited as Production Assistance (制作協力) on their respective episode.)

The second season features returning chief director Doroinu, animation supervisor Shinbo, character designer Taniguchi, and composer Ozawa. However, unlike the first season, Miyamoto is instead the director, rather than rotating with Okada and Yoshizawa. While Taniguchi returns as chief animation director as well, Sugiyama and Yamamura are replaced by Itou and Rina Iwamoto as chief animation directors. Miyai and Takano return as main animators, and are joined by Hiroto Nagata and Kazuki Kawada (both of Shaft). Katsuhiko Katayama also joins the series as co-series composition writer.

The third season retains the same staff with a few changes: Taniguchi becomes the sole chief animation director, and Takano is no longer a main animator.

== Episode list ==
=== Season 1 ===
No. overall	No. in season	Title	Directed by	Written by	Storyboarded by	Original release date
1	1	"Have You Heard? That Rumor About the Magical Girls"; Transliteration: "Yaa Yaa, Shitteru? Mahō Shōjo no Sono Uwasa" (Japanese: やぁやぁ、知ってる？魔法少女のその噂)	Yukihiro Miyamoto	Kaede Ogawa, Gekidan Inu Curry (Doroinu)	Toshimasa Suzuki	January 5, 2020
Iroha Tamaki is a magical girl who cannot remember the wish she made with Kyubey in order to become one. While meeting up with another magical girl named Kuroe, she learns of a rumor that magical girls can apparently be saved if they go to Kamihama City. The two suddenly find themselves caught up in a Witch's labyrinth on the train they were riding, which soon merges with that of another Witch residing in Kamihama. It is there that Iroha briefly encounters a younger-looking Kyubey before another magical girl named Yachiyo Nanami appears and defeats the Witch, warning the others to stay away from Kamihama. The next day, as a result of her encounter with the small Kyubey, Iroha remembers she had a younger sister Ui, whose disease she wished to cure.
2	2	"It's Proof of the End of a Friendship"; Transliteration: "Sore ga Zekkō Shōmeisho" (Japanese: それが絶交証明書)	Hajime Ootani	Kaede Ogawa, Gekidan Inu Curry (Doroinu)	Hajime Ootani	January 12, 2020
Wanting to investigate the mystery concerning Ui's disappearance, Iroha heads to Kamihama City to visit Satomi Medical Center, only to discover another Witch's labyrinth. There, she encounters a team of magical girls, Momoko Togame, Kaede Akino, and Rena Minami, who offer to help her search for Ui. Unable to enter the medical center's wing, the girls try to convince Rena to use her transformation magic to sneak in, only for her and Kaede to end up fighting with each other. As Kaede tries to make up with Rena the next day, she is suddenly ensnared by the Chain Witch, who targets those who try to reconcile after writing their names on the Friendship Ending Staircase.
3	3	"Sorry for Making You My Friend"; Transliteration: "Tomodachi ni Shite Gomen ne" (Japanese: 友達にしてごめんね)	Kenjirou Okada	Kaede Ogawa, Gekidan Inu Curry (Doroinu)	Kenjirou Okada	January 19, 2020
After Kaede is abducted by the Chain Witch, Iroha is introduced to the group's coordinator, Yakumo Mitama, finding that Yachiyo is also a part of the team. Managing to convince Yachiyo to help them, the girls write their names on the Friendship Ending Staircase, with Rena's honest feelings towards Kaede luring out the Chain Witch. As Rena reunites with Kaede in the labyrinth and makes up with her, Iroha once again spots the Small Kyubey, which leads the girls to the Witch's weak point. After defeating it, Yachiyo suspects that what they faced was not a Witch, but something else entirely. Although Rena's investigation of the medical center turns up nothing on Ui, she does learn about two other girls that appeared in Iroha's dream, Touka and Nemu. Meanwhile, Mami Tomoe is asked to investigate Kamihama City on the behest of Kyubey, who can't enter Kamihama himself.
4	4	"This Isn't the Past"; Transliteration: "Kako ja nai desu" (Japanese: 過去じゃないです)	Takashi Asami	Kaede Ogawa, Gekidan Inu Curry (Doroinu)	Kei Ajiki	January 26, 2020
After the people who were held captive by the Chain Witch reappear, Iroha, believing Ui's disappearance may be related to one of the similar rumors going around, is sent to meet a magical girl named Tsuruno Yui. She ends up leading her back to Yachiyo, who tells them of a rumor concerning a Seance Shrine that allegedly allows people to meet someone they want to see. As the three tour through each shrine in the area for clues, seemingly ending up with nothing, they encounter a Witch in a supermarket, which Tsuruno manages to defeat. Realizing that the Seance Shrine only appears at night, Yachiyo brings the girls to one of the shrines, where Iroha once again finds the small Kyubey. While Tsuruno stays behind to fight the Seance Shrine's familiars, Iroha and Yachiyo enter the Seance Shrine's labyrinth, where they encounter the vision of not only Ui, but a girl named Mifuyu too.
5	5	"There's No Place for You Here"; Transliteration: "Anata ga Wattehairu Sukima nante Nain desu yo?" (Japanese: あなたが割って入る隙間なんてないんですよ？)	Midori Yoshizawa	Kaede Ogawa, Gekidan Inu Curry (Doroinu)	Yukihiro Miyamoto, Midori Yoshizawa	February 2, 2020
As Iroha finds the Ui before her to be a fake, Yachiyo seems convinced that the Mifuyu before her is the real thing, who tries to get her to stay. This Mifuyu tries to attack Iroha, but Yachiyo realizes that it is an imposter and defeats it, after which Iroha uses her own Grief Seed to clear up Yachiyo's Soul Gem. As the true monster of the Shrine appears, Iroha starts becoming affected by the murkiness of her own Soul Gem, leading her to call forth a mysterious creature, which kills the Shrine monster. Just as the creature begins to turn against the others, Mami appears and blasts the creature away, freeing Iroha. After suspecting Iroha of being a Witch and questioning the others about the strange happenings in Kamihama, Mami takes her leave, warning Tsuruno not to trust Yachiyo. Waking up to find her Soul Gem mysteriously clear, Iroha spends the night at Yachiyo's house. Elsewhere, Kaede ends up summoning a similar creature during a battle with a Witch, becoming conflicted over what just happened.
6	6	"I'll Do Anything"; Transliteration: "Nandatte Shiteyaru yo" (Japanese: なんだってしてやるよ)	Yukihiro Miyamoto	Ryōma Ikefukurō, Kaede Ogawa, Gekidan Inu Curry (Doroinu)	Takeshi Ninomiya	February 9, 2020
Unaware of what happened the previous night, Iroha comes across a mysterious place offering something called Lucky Owl Water, where she meets a self-proclaimed mercenary named Felicia Mitsuki. Meanwhile, Yachiyo is approached by Kyoko Sakura, who has come to Kamihama to hunt Witches. Experiencing a string of lucky occurrences from drinking the Lucky Owl Water, Iroha hears from Yachiyo that something bad will apparently happen after 24 lucky things have happened. As Iroha, Felicia, Yachiyo and Tsuruno search for the "Uwasa" behind the Lucky Owl Water, they are confronted by a group of girls known as the Wings of the Magius, who offer Felicia the opportunity to eradicate all Witches if she works for them.
7	7	"I Want to Go Home with You"; Transliteration: "Issho ni Kaeritai" (Japanese: 一緒に帰りたい)	Kenjirou Okada	Ryōma Ikefukurō, Kaede Ogawa, Gekidan Inu Curry (Doroinu)	Mie Ōishi	February 16, 2020
Felicia meets with twin sisters Tsukuyo and Tsukasa Amane, the White Feathers of the Wings of the Magius that Kyouko also appears to be a member of. Having placed a transmitter on Felicia, Iroha's group find the lair and come up against the Amane sisters, who have the ability to control Witches. As Iroha goes on to confront the Owl Uwasa, the Amane sisters use the cloudiness of their Soul Gems to summon their own Witches, known as Doppels. After Iroha defeats the Uwasa by once again bringing out her Doppel, Yachiyo and Tsuruno that the real Mifuyu is now a member of the Wings of the Magius. After Mifuyu and the sisters flee, Iroha offers to let Felicia stay with her before learning that she will be boarding in the Mikazuki Villa alongside Yachiyo and Tsuruno.
8	8	"You Definitely Shouldn't Respond"; Transliteration: "Zettai ni Henshin Shicha Dame yo" (Japanese: 絶対に返信しちゃだめよ)	Shūji Miyazaki	Kaede Ogawa, Gekidan Inu Curry (Doroinu)	Takashi Sakuma	February 23, 2020
After Iroha transfers into Kamihama Middle School, she hears from Rena about rumors concerning an "Invisible Girl" and "Endless Solitude", along with one from Tsuruno about an "Electric Wave Girl". The next day, Iroha picks up Felicia after she gets in a fight with people insulting her friends, and two investigate the radio tower, where they hear a laughing voice coming from Iroha's phone. The day afterwards, Iroha notices a connection between the voice and the seemingly spam messages she has been receiving and investigates the radio tower again and encounters Tsukuyo, who brings up someone named Sana Futaba before being chased off by the arrival of Yachiyo and the others. Responding to the spam, she receives a text back from the sender urging her to find her in the Endless Solitude.
9	9	"A World with Just Me"; Transliteration: "Watashi Shika Inai Sekai" (Japanese: 私しかいない世界)	Midori Yoshizawa	Kaede Ogawa, Gekidan Inu Curry (Doroinu)	Midori Yoshizawa	March 1, 2020
The mysterious sender, an Uwasa named Ai, asks Iroha to enter the Endless Solitude and delete her in order to free Sana, who is trapped in there. A flashback shows how Ai was befriended by Sana, who came to the Endless Solitude as she felt she didn't belong in the outside world after wishing to become invisible. As Iroha arrives in Endless Solitude to rescue Sana as per Ai's wishes, another magical girl from the Wings of the Magius, Alina Gray, appears and attacks with her Doppel. Ai manages to teleport Alina away but is hit by her Doppel's attack, asking Sana to destroy her before it takes her over.
10	10	"My Name"; Transliteration: "Watashi no Namae" (Japanese: 私の名前)	Takashi Asami	Kaede Ogawa, Gekidan Inu Curry (Doroinu)	Mie Ōishi	March 8, 2020
Yachiyo's group arrive at Endless Solitude's exit, where they activate a magnet that manages to rescue Iroha and Sana as they come out of the space. Angered by her plan's failure, Alina sends a Witch she had captured to attack the others, but she is forced to retreat by Mami, who has also joined the Wings of the Magius. As the girls buy new mugs to try to cheer Sana up following her ordeal, she briefly returns home to bid farewell to her family, realizing that she has a new family in Iroha and the others. Sana then reveals that Nemu Hiiragi, one of the girls from Iroha's dreams, is another Magius member.
11	11	"Memory Museum at 3:00 PM"; Transliteration: "Yakusoku wa Gogo-san-ji, Kioku Myūjiamu nite" (Japanese: 約束は午後三時、記憶ミュージアムにて)	Norihito Takahashi	Ryōma Ikefukurō, Kaede Ogawa, Gekidan Inu Curry (Doroinu)	Shūji Miyazaki	March 15, 2020
Wanting to find out more about Nemu, Iroha approaches Tsukuyo, asking her to let her see Nemu in exchange for keeping quiet about her other identity. The next day, Iroha goes shopping with the others to buy coasters for Yachiyo, encountering a Witch along the way. Later that night, Mifuyu comes by the villa to ask Iroha to join the Wings of Magius, inviting her and others to attend a lecture at a place called the Memory Museum the next day. Arriving at the museum, they are confronted by the other girl that appeared in Iroha's dreams, Touka Satomi. Meanwhile, Momoko meets up with Rena to tell her about what happened to Yachiyo a year ago.
12	12	"Why Is This So Unbearable?"; Transliteration: "Dōshite Konna ni Mijime nan desu ka" (Japanese: どうしてこんなにみじめなんですか)	Kenjirou Okada	Kaede Ogawa, Gekidan Inu Curry (Doroinu)	Takashi Sakuma, Tomoko Hiramuki	March 22, 2020
Touka, who states that she has no memories of Ui either, explains to Iroha and the others that a magical girl's Soul Gem literally contains their very soul, while Momoko and Kaede relay this same information to Rena. Mifuyu then shows Iroha her memories, in which Kanae, who was allied with her, Yachiyo, and Momoko, died after her Soul Gem was shattered. Soon afterwards, another one of their allies, Mel, turned into a Witch when their Soul Gem became fully tainted with despair, leading the girls to realize that they had been tricked by Kyubey. As Mifuyu felt the despair of carrying this knowledge, her Soul Gem became contaminated, but instead of becoming a Witch, she spawned a Doppel, which Touka reveals to be a system that she had created to offer magical girls liberation.
13	13	"A Faint Hope"; Transliteration: "Tatta Hitotsu no Michishirube" (Japanese: たったひとつの道しるべ)	Yukihiro Miyamoto	Kaede Ogawa, Gekidan Inu Curry (Doroinu)	Toshimasa Suzuki, Kei Ajiki, Yukihiro Miyamoto	March 29, 2020
Coming to retrieve Iroha, Yachiyo tells her that she plans to disband the team, believing everyone who stays by her side is fated to die because of her own wish to survive. Despite this, Iroha remains firm in staying with Yachiyo, promising to prove her doubts as false. As Mami, who has been brainwashed by the Magius, tries to stop Yachiyo from escaping the museum with Iroha, they are rescued by another magical girl, Sayaka Miki. When Mami goes berserk and launches a full-out assault on Sayaka, both Iroha and Yachiyo summon their Doppels to fight against her. As both Iroha and Mami get caught up in the collapsing museum while Sayaka carries Yachiyo to safety, it is revealed that several other magical girls, including Tsuruno and Kaede, have joined with the Magius.

=== Season 2: The Eve of Awakening ===
No. overall	No. in season	Title	Directed by (Note: Information is taken from the ending credits of each episode.)	Written by	Storyboarded by	Original release date
14	1	"I Had a Feeling We Could All Become Magical Girls Together"; Transliteration: "Minna de Nara Mahō Shōjo ni Nareru Ki ga Shita no" (Japanese: みんなでなら魔法少女になれる気がしたの)	Yukihiro Miyamoto	Gekidan Inu Curry (Doroinu), Katsuhiko Takayama	Yuki Yase; Midori Yoshizawa, (Note: C Part Storyboard (Cパート絵コンテ)) Kenta Yokoya (Note: Transformation Scene Storyboard (変身シーン絵コンテ))	August 1, 2021
Returning to Mitakihara, Sayaka informs Madoka Kaname and Homura Akemi about what happened to Mami and the truth she learned about Magical Girls, with Kyubey showing up to confirm what she learned. As Sayaka is angered by this news, showing animosity towards Homura for already knowing the truth, Homura, who had been repeating the same timeframe in the hopes of saving Madoka from a grim fate, notices that this timeline is different after seeing a vision of Ui. The next day, Homura goes in alone to save a group of people from a Witch while Madoka goes in to save her, prompting Sayaka to stop moping and join them. While fighting with Homura and her timestop ability, Sayaka comes to the realization that Magical Girls need to stick together and joins Madoka and Homura in defeating in the Witch. As the three resolve to go to Kamihama to rescue Mami, Homura becomes optimistic that this could be the timeline in which she can save Madoka. Back in Kamihama, Yachiyo interrogates a Magius member about the whereabouts of their HQ, Hotel Faint Hope, where Kuroe, who has also become a Magius member, is summoned by Nemu in regards to a matter concerning Iroha.
15	2	"You're Nothing Like Me"; Transliteration: "Anata to wa Sukoshimo Nite Nanka nai" (Japanese: あなたとは少しも似てなんかない)	Naoaki Shibuta	Gekidan Inu Curry (Doroinu), Katsuhiko Takayama	Yukihiro Miyamoto, Midori Yoshizawa, Kenta Yokoya	August 8, 2021
As Yachiyo, stricken with grief over Iroha's disappearance, takes down more Uwasas in the hopes of finding Hotel Faint Hope and taking Magius down, Nemu secretly tasks Kuroe with tracking down an Uwasa she created and protecting a certain person. Yachiyo questions Mitama, who reveals that there are side effects that come with the Doppel form and informs her that a Black Feather is needed to enter Hotel Faint Hope. In searching for another Uwasa, Yachiyo runs into Kuroe, who had been chasing after the small Kyubey, before she comes across Mifuyu and takes her anger out on her. Yachiyo overwhelms Mifuyu with her Doppel form, but stops herself from killing her, refusing to sacrifice anyone else. After Mifuyu escapes, with Kuroe getting left behind, Yachiyo chases her and the small Kyubey into the barrier of Nemu's Uwasa, The Eternal Sakura, where they discover Iroha in her Doppel form.
16	3	"There Were Too Many To Carry"; Transliteration: "Mochikirenai Hodo Atta Desho" (Japanese: 持ちきれないほどあったでしょ)	Midori Yoshizawa	Katsuhiko Takayama	Midori Yoshizawa	August 15, 2021
Yachiyo and Kuroe are imprisoned by Iroha's Doppel and end up in a world made of Iroha's fantasies, where everyone knows each other but only Ui is represented as a stuffed bear. As Yachiyo searches for a way to destroy the Doppel, Kuroe spends time in Iroha's fantasies conversing with what appears to be the real Iroha. They soon both discover that the Doppel has been hiding inside Iroha herself, creating a fantasy world and a new sister to overwrite the nightmares Iroha had been having. Combining their powers, Yachiyo and Kuroe manage to defeat the Doppel and bring Iroha back. Meanwhile, Madoka begins her search for Mami.
17	4	"Are You Okay With That?"; Transliteration: "Omae wa Sore de Ii no ka yo" (Japanese: お前はそれでいいのかよ)	Shūji Miyazaki	Katsuhiko Takayama	Yukihiro Miyamoto, Hiroto Nagata	August 22, 2021
Following Iroha's rescue, The Eternal Sakura escapes, telling Iroha that it will be waiting for her and three others. Learning that Nemu will soon die, Iroha has Kuroe lead her to Hotel Faint Hope while Yachiyo stays behind to hold off the Amane sisters after they come out of the entrance. As Iroha and Kuroe continue on after the sisters close the entrance behind them, they are joined by Kaede and Rena, who are attempting to flee from Magius. While passing through a factory where Witches are being farmed for their Grief Seeds, they are confronted by an Uwasa, which Iroha and Kuroe manage to defeat using their Connect ability after Iroha stops Kuroe from using her Doppel. At that moment, however, Kaede's own Doppel goes berserk from too much use, at which point Mitama arrives with Momoko and locks Kaede away in a Doppel Isolation Ward, where other magical girls who were taken over by their Doppels are being held.
18	5	"I Won't Forgive Anybody"; Transliteration: "Mō Dare mo Yurusanai" (Japanese: もう誰も許さない)	Naoaki Shibuta	Maho Nishibe	Kei Ajiki, Midori Yoshizawa	August 29, 2021
Kuroe joins Iroha as she continues her search while Sana and Felicia run into Kyouko as she attempts to steal Grief Seeds from the Magius. Touka then reveals her plan to draw in all the Witches in a 200km radius to awaken an Artificial Witch named Embryo Eve and spread the Doppel system across the entire world. Kyouko's group finds themselves standing before Embryo Eve itself, where they come across Mifuyu and learn about what happened with Iroha. As Touka and Nemu begin attracting Witches towards Kamihama, including Walpurgisnacht, Kuroe urges Iroha to go ahead while she stays behind to hold back the Feathers with her Doppel form.
19	6	"This Is Something Only I Can Do"; Transliteration: "Watashi ni Shika Dekinai Koto Desu" (Japanese: 私にしかできないことです)	Shouhei Fujita	Maho Nishibe	Shūji Miyazaki	September 5, 2021
Upon learning of Iroha's safety, Sana and Felicia convince Mifuyu to return to Mikazuki Villa with them. Meanwhile, Iroha arrives at the Chelation Land amusement park where the Witches are being gathered while Yachiyo is joined by Madoka, Sayaka, and Homura. Mifuyu confronts Touka and Nemu in an attempt to retrieve Tsuruno, only to discover that Tsuruno has been possessed by something. Receiving assistance from Kyouko, Iroha manages to open the gate to let Yachiyo's group into the park, where they are confronted by both Mami and Tsuruno.
20	7	"You Don't Know Anything"; Transliteration: "Nani mo Shiranai ja nai" (Japanese: 何も知らないじゃない)	Yukihiro Miyamoto	Katsuhiko Takayama	Yukihiro Miyamoto, Naoaki Shibuta	September 12, 2021
Forced to retreat from Mami and Tsuruno's attack, the girls reunite with Sana and Felicia, the latter of whom runs off after Yachiyo tells her that she doesn't want to hurt others to protect herself from becoming a Witch. As Iroha and the others learn about Embryo Eve from a plan giving to Sana by Mifuyu, Mifuyu and Momoko manage to convince Mitama to tell them how they can separate Mami and Tsuruno from the Uwasas they have been fused. Learning that they need to use Connect on the afflicted while having a strong grasp on their personality, Yachiyo attempts the technique on Tsuruno. It fails, however, resulting in Tsuruno taking heavy bodily damage while the Uwasa remains in control.
20.5	7.5	"Special Episode"; Transliteration: "Sekando Shīzun Sōshūhen" (Japanese: 2nd SEASON総集編)	Jun Kasahara	N/A	N/A	September 19, 2021
Recap episode covering all 20 previous episodes.
21	8	"You're Not Strong"; Transliteration: "Tsuyoku Nanka nē Daro" (Japanese: 強くなんかねーだろ)	Midori Yoshizawa	Katsuhiko Takayama	Midori Yoshizawa	September 26, 2021
As Yachiyo believes the Connect failed because she doesn't truly understand Tsuruno, Iroha steps in to protect her from Tsuruno's attack, somehow using Connect to link their minds together. This brings her to a mysterious stage, which shows how Tsuruno blamed herself for Meru's death and perceived herself as unreliable. This led her to force herself to act strong and cheerful while hiding all the pain she is going through, but upon learning about how Meru truly died, she became unable to do so any longer. Realizing Tsuruno's true feelings and wishing for her to stop pretending to be strong, Iroha and Yachiyo managed to successfully separate Tsuruno from the Uwasa, with Madoka and Sayaka managing to do the same for Mami, before Iroha and Madoka destroy the device attracting the Witches. As Madoka and her group return to Mitakihara after Walpurgisnacht changes course, Kuroe tries to rejoin Iroha but is stopped by inner demons telling her not to get involved. As Iroha alone manages to enter the castle and catch up to Touka, Nemu steps in to reveal the truth about everything that has happened.

=== Season 3: Dawn of a Shallow Dream ===
No. overall	No. in season	Title	Directed by	Written by	Storyboarded by	Original release date
22	1	"We Failed"; Transliteration: "Bokutachi wa Shippai Shita" (Japanese: 僕たちは失敗した)	Midori Yoshizawa	Maho Nishibe	Midori Yoshizawa, Kenta Yokoya	April 3, 2022
Nemu recounts the events that transpired after Iroha had formed a contract with Kyubey in order to save Ui's life. Curious as to why Iroha had been visiting them less, Ui, Nemu and Touka follow her into a Witch's labyrinth and learn of her duty as a magical girl, at which point they too are approached by Kyubey. After doing research on Witch appearances and getting what information they can out of Kyubey, the trio deduce that magical girls are fated to turn into Witches, a fact that Alina overhears. Wanting to save Iroha from becoming a Witch, Ui, Touka and Nemu wish to steal Kyubey's powers, allowing them to remove impurities from Soul Gems, transform them into magic, and manifest it into energy respectively, with the intention of automatically purifying Soul Gems over a wide area. However, Ui ends up absorbing too much impurities and starts to turn into a Witch, forcing Touka and Nemu, with assistance from Alina, to transfer Ui's soul into Kyubey's now empty vessel. As Nemu is left as the only one who remembers Ui's existence, she, Touka, and Alina concoct a plan to use Ui's body, now an Artificial Witch named Embryo Eve, in order to save magical girls.
23	2	"All the Girls Disappearing"; Transliteration: "Yagate Kie Yuku Shōjotachi yo" (Japanese: やがて消えゆく少女たちよ)	Naoaki Shibuta	Katsuhiko Takayama	Yukihiro Miyamoto, Naoaki Shibuta	April 3, 2022
With Touka and Iroha's memories restored, Nemu reveals that she never told Touka the truth to keep her from giving up on their plan. Determined to see their plan through regardless, Nemu and Touka seals Iroha inside Small Kyubey before activating Embryo Eve, which starts adversely affecting the other magical girls, causing their Doppels to go out of control. As Yachiyo chases after Nemu and Touka as they pursue Walpurgisnacht towards Mitakihara, Mifuyu and Momoko sacrifice themselves in order to save the other magical girls, including Kaede and the others that were transformed.
24	3	"How Long Do We Continue Being Magical Girls?"; Transliteration: "Itsu made Mahō Shōjo o Tsuzukenakya Ikenai no?" (Japanese: いつまで魔法少女を続けなきゃいけないの？)	Shouhei Fujita, Midori Yoshizawa	Katsuhiko Takayama	Hoshihira Fujita, Midori Yoshizawa, Kenta Yokoya	April 3, 2022
Appearing before Iroha inside of Small Kyubey, Ui pleads to Iroha to stop Nemu and Touka before returning her to the real world, where Kuroe is being overtaken by her Doppel. A flashback reveals that Kuroe had abandoned another magical girl in need due to her own insecurities. Despite Iroha's determination to save her, Kuroe's despair carries her outside of Alina's barrier, turning her into a Witch that Iroha is forced to kill.
25	4	"No One Knows Our Record"; Transliteration: "Dare mo Shiranai, Watashitachi no Kiroku" (Japanese: 誰も知らない、私たちの記録)	Yukihiro Miyamoto	Katsuhiko Takayama	Yukihiro Miyamoto, Gekidan Inu Curry (Doroinu)	April 3, 2022
Just as Iroha starts to fall into despair of the guilt of driving Kuroe to her death, she is saved by Yachiyo and the others, who give her the hope that they carry inside of them. Catching up to Embryo Eve before it can reach Walpurgisnacht, Iroha manages to reach Nemu and Touka and convince them to stop. Just then, however, Alina reveals her plan to merge her Doppel with Embryo Eve and steal Walpurgisnacht's power so that she can turn all of humanity into magical girls and make them experience the same fate. Determined to stop Alina, Nemu and Touka launch a kamikaze attack against Alina. After seeing a vision of Ui encouraging her to find happiness, Iroha gains her collection ability and, alongside Yachiyo who had received the hopes of her fallen friends, manages to finally stop Alina.
