= Zhangjiajie National Forest Park =

National forest in Hunan, China

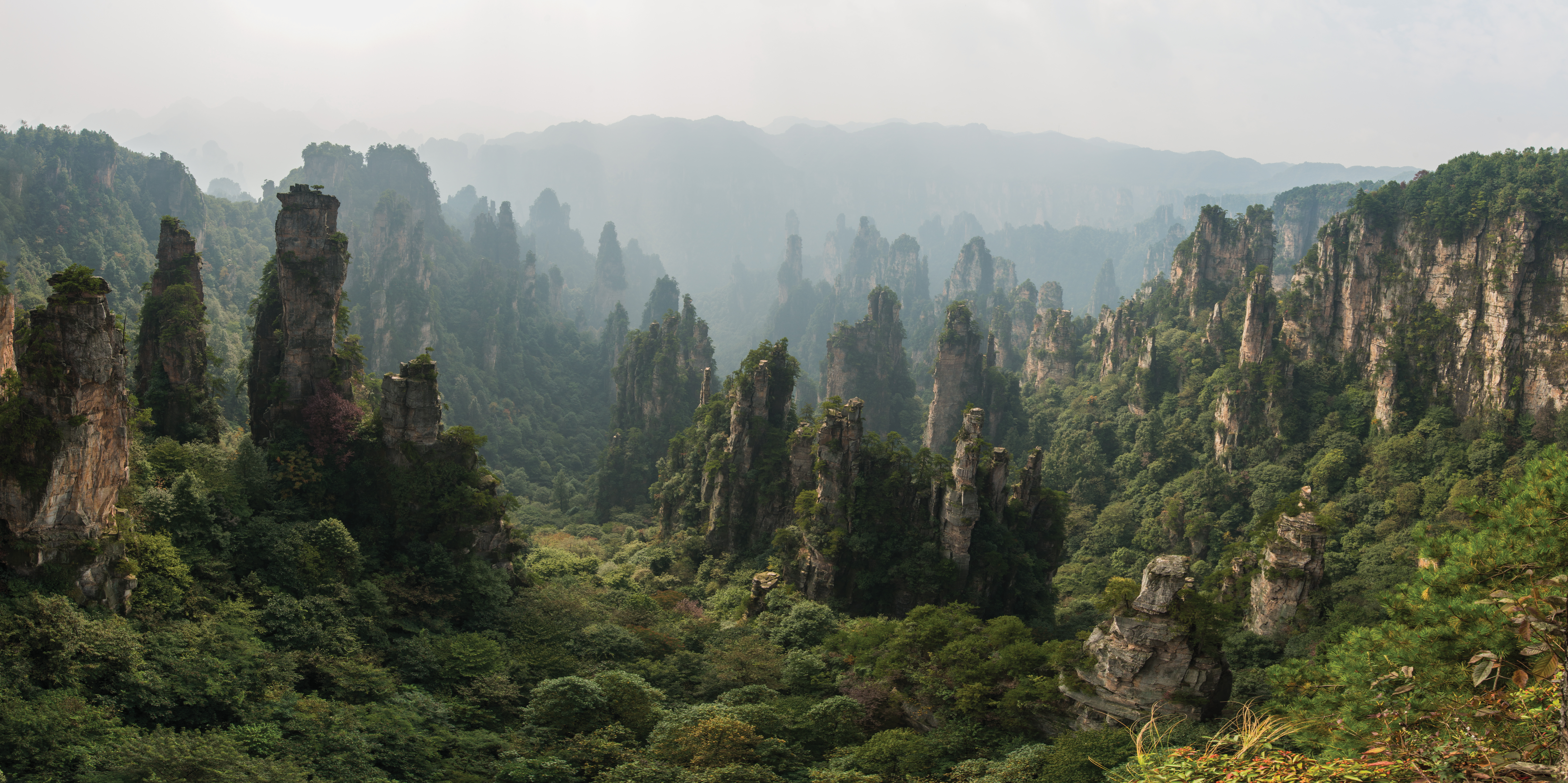
- Zhangjiajie Mountains

- Location within China
- Location: Zhangjiajie, Hunan, China
- Coordinates: 29°21′00″N 110°26′07″E
- Area: 4,810 hectares (11,900 acres)
- Established: 1982
- Governing body: Wulingyuan Scenic and Historic Interest Area
- World Heritage site: 1992

Zhangjiajie National Forest Park (Chinese: 湖南张家界国家森林公园; pinyin: Húnán Zhāngjiājiè Guójiā Sēnlín Gōngyuán; lit. 'Hunan Zhangjiajie National Forest Park') is a national forest park located in Zhangjiajie, Hunan Province, China. It is one of several national parks within the Wulingyuan Scenic Area.

== History ==
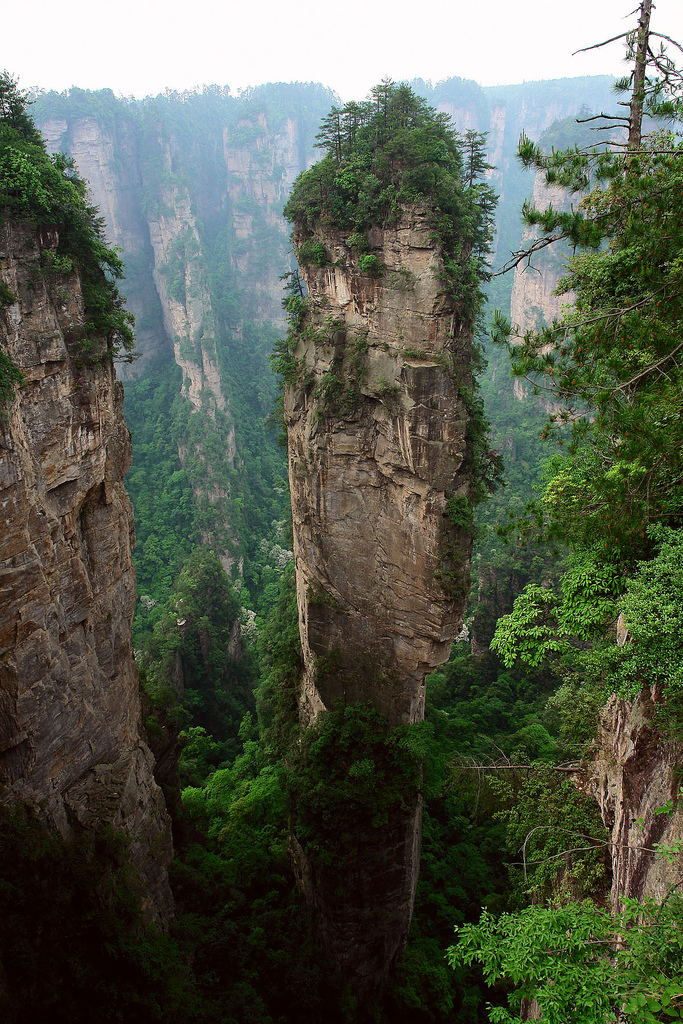
Zhangjiajie National Forest Park

In 1982, the park was recognized as China's first national forest park with an area of 4,810 ha (11,900 acres). Zhangjiajie National Forest Park is part of a much larger 397.5 km^{2} (153.5 sq mi) Wulingyuan Scenic Area. In 1992, Wulingyuan was officially recognized as a UNESCO World Heritage Site. It was then approved by the Ministry of Land and Resources as Zhangjiajie Sandstone Peak Forest National Geopark (3,600 km^{2} (1,400 sq mi)) in 2001. In 2004, Zhangjiajie geopark part of the first few members which joined the UNESCO Global Geoparks Network. In 2015, it was officially designated as a UNESCO Global Geopark.

The most notable geographic features of the park are the pillar-like formations that are seen throughout the park. Although resembling karst terrain, this area is not underlain by limestones and is not the product of chemical dissolution, which is characteristic of limestone karst. They are the result of many years of physical, rather than chemical, erosion. Much of the weathering that forms these pillars is the result of expanding ice in the winter and the plants that grow on them. The weather is moist year-round, and as a result, the foliage is very dense. The weathered material is carried away primarily by streams. These formations are a distinct hallmark of the Chinese landscape, and can be found in many ancient Chinese paintings.

One of the park's quartz-sandstone pillars, the 1,080-metre (3,540 ft) Southern Sky Column, was officially renamed "Avatar Hallelujah Mountain" (Chinese: 阿凡达-哈利路亚山; pinyin: Āfándá hālìlùyà shān) in honor of the movie Avatar in January 2010. The film's director and production designers said that they drew inspiration for the floating rocks from mountains from around the world, but mainly from Guilin, Huangshan, and Zhangjiajie in Hunan province.

== Structures ==
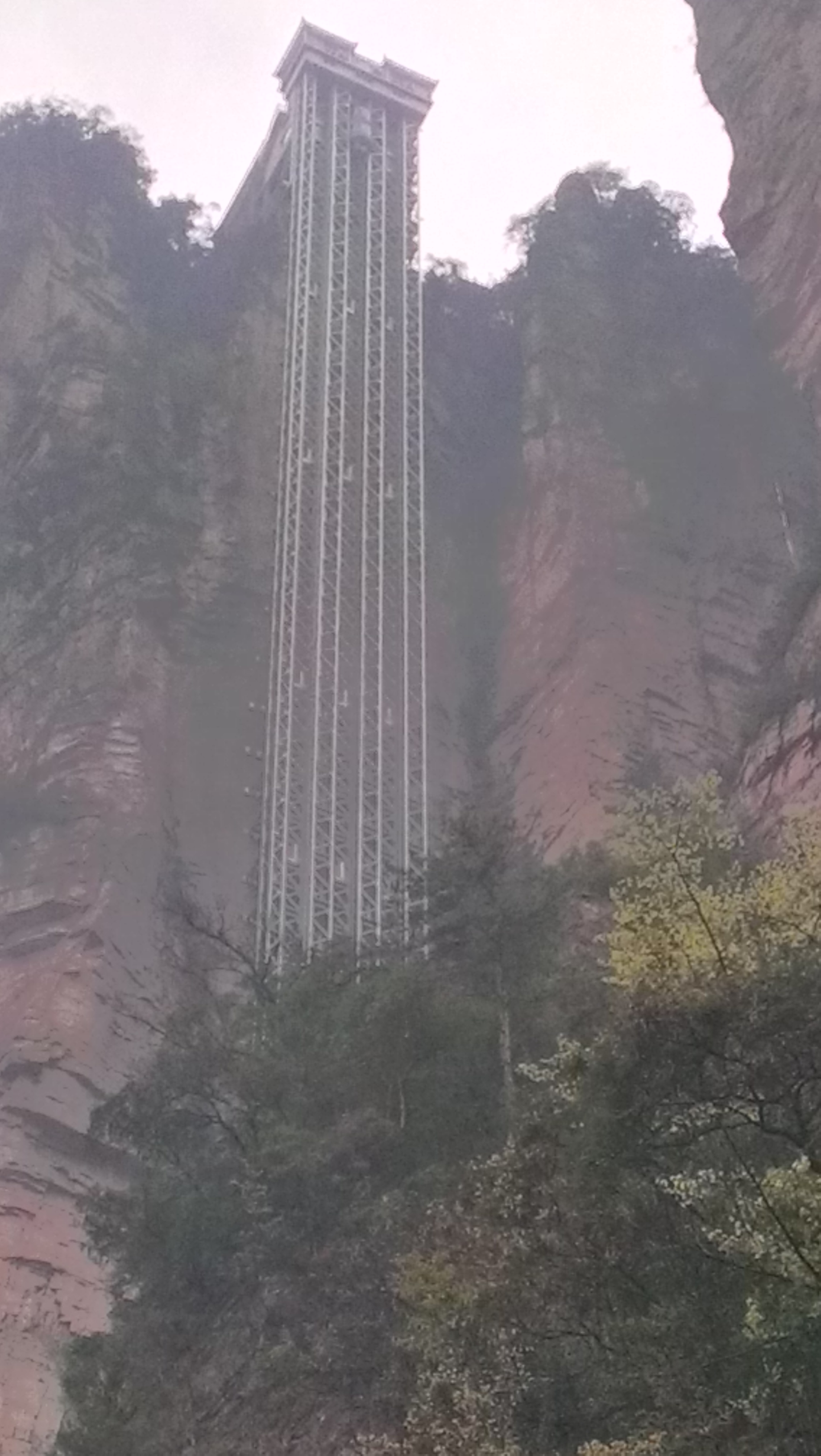
Bailong Elevator

The Bailong Elevator, literally "hundred dragons sky lift", was opened to the public in 2002. At 326 m (1,070 ft), it is the world's tallest outdoor lift. It can transport visitors to the top from its foot in less than two minutes. The structure is composed of three separate glass elevators, each of which can carry up to 50 people at a time.

In August 2016, Zhangjiajie Grand Canyon opened the Zhangjiajie Grand Canyon Glass Bridge, the longest (430 m (1,410 ft)) and highest (300 m (980 ft)) pedestrian glass bridge in the world. Thirteen days after opening, the bridge was closed due to the sheer number of visitors. On 30 September 2016, the bridge reopened after adjustments to its logistics and safety measures for handling a large number of tourists.

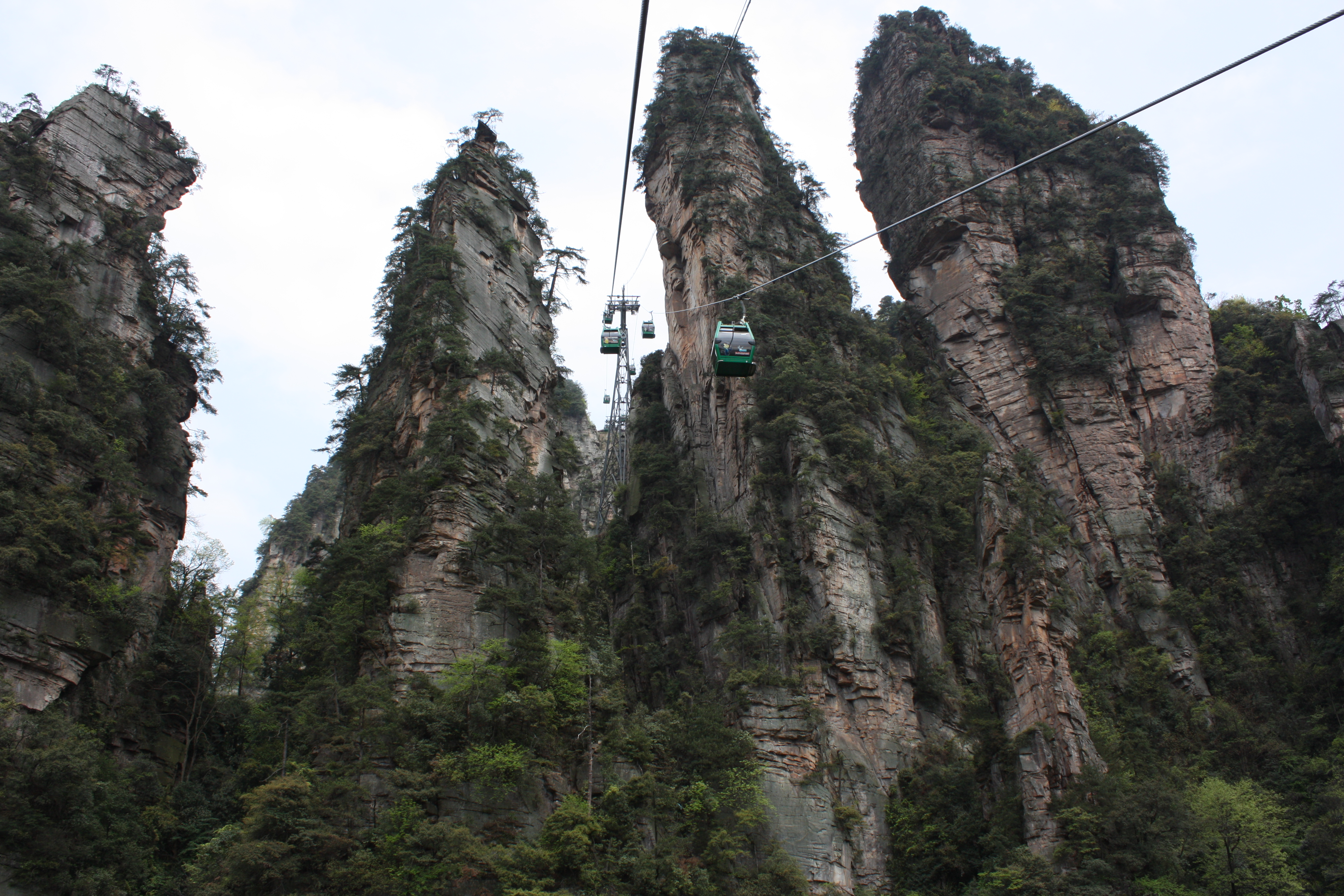
Tianzi Mountain Cable Car

There are three gondola lift systems within the park—The Tianzi Mountain Cable Car, Yangjiajie cable car and Huangshizhai cable car.

There is also a monorail to take visitors up the Ten-Mile Gallery.

Another feature of the national park is the karst caves scattered throughout the area. In April and May of 2025, footage of the caves filled with garbage was published online, leading to a widespread cleaning operation in those caves.

== See also ==
- Global Geoparks Network
- List of national geoparks
- Tianmen Mountain, a feature within the nearby Tianmen Mountain National Park.
- Guilin Scenic Area
