= Wuling Mountains =

Mountain range in China

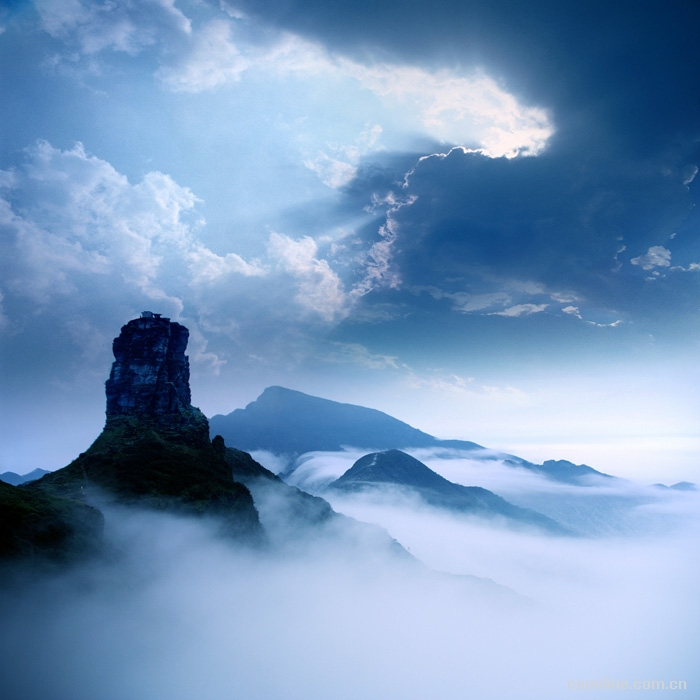
- Mount Fanjing

Highest point
- Peak: Mount Fanjing
- Elevation: 2,570 m (8,430 ft)
- Coordinates: 27°54′09″N 108°44′34″E

Geography

The Wuling Mountains (simplified Chinese: 武陵山脉; traditional Chinese: 武陵山脈; pinyin: Wǔlíng Shānmài) are a mountain range located in Central China, running from Chongqing Municipality and East Guizhou to West Hunan. They are home to many ethnic groups, including the Tujia, Han, Miao, Dong, and Bai.

== Wulingyuan ==
The Wulingyuan Scenic and Historic Interest Area is a UNESCO World Heritage Site in the Wuling Mountain Range noted for its more than 3,000 quartzite sandstone pillars and peaks across most of the site, along with many ravines and gorges between them with streams, pools and waterfalls.

== Fanjingshan ==
Fanjingshan or Mount Fanjing, located in Guizhou province, is the highest peak in the Wuling Mountain range, at an altitude of 2,570 m (8,430 ft). The Fanjingshan National Nature Reserve was established in 1978. It was designated a UNESCO Biosphere Reserve in 1986 and a World Heritage Site in 2018.
