= Wriothesley (Genshin Impact) =

Fictional character in a video game

- Genshin Impact character
- Official artwork
- First game: Genshin Impact (2023)
- Voiced by: EN: Joe Zieja; ZH: Liu Beichen; JA: Daisuke Ono; KO: Kwon Chang-wook

In-universe information
- Occupation: Prison administrator
- Weapon: Gauntlets
- Home: Fontaine
- Element: Cryo

Wriothesley (/ˈraɪəθsli/ RY-əth-slee; Chinese: 莱欧斯利; pinyin: Lái'ōusīlì) is a fictional character in the video game Genshin Impact, developed by miHoYo. He first appeared in version 4.1 of the game in 2023 and became playable later that year. He is the warden of the Fortress of Meropide, an underwater prison in the fictional nation of Fontaine. Orphaned as a child, Wriothesley murdered his adoptive parents as a teenager after they abused and trafficked children. After being imprisoned for the crime, he gradually amassed influence and ultimately became the prison's administrator, reforming it and receiving the title of "Duke". In the game's story, he meets the protagonist Traveler and their guide Paimon while within the prison, and later joins the people of Fontaine, the Traveler and Paimon in confronting a prophesied flood crisis.

Elements of Wriothesley's character design were inspired by Cerberus, the three-headed dog from Greek mythology that guards the entrance to the underworld, while his appearance also incorporates traits associated with prison guards. Wriothesley's character design was received positively. Players and critics also praised the multifaceted personality he displays in the story, and the character inspired a large amount of fan-created works. He introduced a new style of gameplay to Genshin Impact, and his combat mechanics and overall strength were received well, although he has limitations when facing groups of enemies.

== Design and voice acting ==
In the game, Wriothesley is the warden of Fontaine's underwater prison, the Fortress of Meropide, and holds the title of "Duke". He combines the authority of an administrator with a more approachable and friendly side. His design incorporates numerous dog- and wolf-like elements. The name of his Constellation, "Cerberus", derives from the three-headed dog of Greek mythology that guards the entrance to the underworld, reflecting his role as the guardian of the Fortress of Meropide. His animal-ear-like hairstyle and dog-head-shaped emblem likewise evoke Cerberus. He is shown as a strong, handsome, and taciturn young man with tousled short hair, a red-and-black coat, and a pair of metal handcuffs hanging from his waist. In combat, he wears mechanical gauntlets on both hands as his weapons.

Wriothesley is voiced in Chinese by Liu Beichen, in English by Joe Zieja, in Japanese by Daisuke Ono, and in Korean by Kwon Chang-wook. Ono had previously voiced Jotaro Kujo, the protagonist of JoJo's Bizarre Adventure. Both JoJo and Wriothesley are close-range fighters who attack opponents with their fists, and Ono incorporated Jotaro's "ora ora" line into Wriothesley's battle dialogue as an Easter egg. In an interview, Zieja said that the first scene he recorded was one in which Wriothesley describes himself as a duke who needs no reason to kill someone, leading Zieja's initial impression of him to be that he was a ruthless figure. Zieja, who had served in the United States Air Force before becoming a voice actor, drew on officers he had met during his service when developing Wriothesley's vocal performance.

== Appearances ==
Wriothesley is the warden of Fontaine's underwater prison, the Fortress of Meropide, but he was once one of its prisoners. Orphaned as a child, he discovered as a teenager that his hypocritical adoptive parents had taken in orphans only to abuse and traffick them. He killed them, freed the other children, and escaped the household, for which he was arrested, convicted and imprisoned. In the dangerous and chaotic prison, Wriothesley endured while building wealth, strength and influence through underground boxing matches, also known as Pankration. After many years, he had gained considerable prestige among the prisoners, but the prison's administrator took advantage of this to seize all of Wriothesley's wealth. Wriothesley challenged him to a duel and when the administrator fled, he took control over the prison and became its new overseer. After taking over as warden, Wriothesley introduced a series of reforms and established a more orderly system within the prison. In recognition of his effective administration, he was granted the title of "Duke".

In the game's main storyline, the Traveler infiltrates the Fortress of Meropide by posing as a prisoner at the request of Neuvillette, Fontaine's chief justice, in order to investigate the disappearance of the Fatui Harbinger Tartaglia. The Fatui are one of the game's primary antagonistic factions. At the prison, the Traveler and Paimon meet Wriothesley. They join Fatui siblings Lyney and Lynette, who are conducting their own investigation, uncover a number of secrets within the prison, while Wriothesley quietly guides their actions to suit his own purposes. When pressed, he confirms that Fontaine faces an imminent disaster: rising water from the Primordial Sea threatens to flood the nation. He shows the Traveler a protective gate hidden in the restricted area of the prison, as well as a vessel which he build and named after himself, which his people had been researching and constructing. As the pressure from the Primordial Seawater continues to rise, the protective gate fails. With the assistance of Wriothesley's longtime friend Clorinde, Wriothesley uses his powers over Cryo to hold the Primordial Seawater back temporarily until the Traveler brings Neuvillette to the scene, allowing him to seal it again. After the immediate crisis is resolved, Wriothesley allows the Traveler to enter and leave the Fortress of Meropide freely and grants them preferential treatment within it. When Fontaine's prophecy later comes to pass, he leads a rescue effort aboard the vessel Wriothesley, saving Fontaine's residents from the flood. After the disaster subsides, he declines an interview with Charlotte, a notable local journalist, but allows her to take photographs inside the fortress.

In Wriothesley's Story Quest, the Traveler encounters a man named Faissolle in the Fortress of Meropide after he loses his hat. After returning it, Wriothesley explains that the man belongs to an organization called the Beret Society, a mutual-aid group that claims to rehabilitate criminals. Soon afterward, guards confiscate a shipment of contraband containing a black gemstone capable of bringing back negative memories, which Wriothesley takes into custody. He brings the Traveler to meet Dourgie, the group's leader. Although its members appear upbeat and well-adjusted, Faissolle becomes visibly nervous when he appears again. Wriothesley deliberately leaves the gemstone behind as a test and suggests that the Traveler and Paimon return secretly to observe the group, where they find its members acting fearful and submissive, confirming that something is off about them. Wriothesley reveals that he had already suspected Dourgie and intended to investigate discreetly, but the Traveler and Paimon's arrival disrupted his plans. He therefore used the black gemstone to gain the group's trust, explaining that, as Duke, he could not simply ignore the rules and order a search without cause. That night, Faissolle's girlfriend, Avice, comes forward to confess what she knows, but is stopped by Dourgie. Wriothesley later discovers that a hairpin Avice left behind contains a hollow needle capable of absorbing the fear-filled liquid within the gemstone. An examination revealed puncture wounds on the heads of every Beret Society member, proving that Dourgie had been injecting them directly in the brain to control them through fear. Wriothesley leads a raid on Dourgie's hidden underground base, rescues the people being held there, and defeats Dourgie and the Beret Society guards. When Dourgie argues that criminals can only be made to submit through punishment, Wriothesley recalls the trauma of being deceived by his adoptive parents as a child and angrily rebukes him. He says he will suspend the rule against administering vigilante justice to prisoners and intends to punish Dourgie in the same way. Two days later, he meets the Traveler in the prison cafeteria and speaks more openly about his childhood. When Faissolle and Avice ask to hold their wedding in the Fortress of Meropide, he gladly agrees, reflecting that trust is better than obedience.

=== Gameplay ===
Wriothesley is the game's first five-star Cryo character to use a catalyst in combat, and serves as a close-range attacker who fights with mechanical gauntlets in the lore. His Normal Attacks deal Cryo damage, while his Charged Attack becomes more powerful under certain conditions and restores his health. His Elemental Skill makes him dash forward a short distance, strengthening his attacks while consuming his health, and his Elemental Burst deals area-of-effect Cryo damage to enemies.

== Promotion ==
Wriothesley first appeared in a preview trailer for Fontaine, which was released on July 3, 2023. On August 14, miHoYo revealed his character design and abilities, while also announcing that he would become playable in the future. He formally debuted in version 4.1 of the game, which was released on September 27. miHoYo then released a character story teaser titled "Necessary Procedure" on October 11, showing Wriothesley protecting the daughter of a criminal while arresting him. On October 12, a web event was launched in which players were asked to assist Wriothesley with various investigations inside the Fortress of Meropide. The web event was followed by the release of a gameplay teaser called "Art of Improvisation" on October 16. The next day, he became playable alongside his signature weapon, "Cashflow Supervision". On the same day, miHoYo released a video analyzing his combat abilities. At launch, some of his actions had a small chance of malfunctioning under certain conditions. miHoYo apologized and issued bug fixes on October 19 and November 8.

In September 2025, Samsung Electronics held a pop-up store at its Samsung Store location in Hongdae, Seoul, South Korea, reimagining Wriothesley as a rock star. The venue featured a large LED display case that played character-specific voice lines when visitors pressed a button. On the second floor, visitors could wear Galaxy Buds to listen to a band arrangement of Wriothesley's theme music, creating an immersive "Fontaine rock concert" atmosphere. Access to the merchandise area was limited to customers with reservations; it sold fourteen exclusive items and offered purchase-based bonuses like shopping bags, transparent photo cards, and holographic tickets. The event also included a paid minigame area, where visitors who completed three task-based minigames could receive three different photo cards as rewards. On two days, a Wriothesley cosplayer appeared for a total of nine photo sessions. According to Asia Today reporter Kim Dong-wook, one attendee said that they had spent more than ₩50,000 and did not regret it at all, while some fans traveled from Busan specifically to attend. Kim characterized the pop-up store as turning Wriothesley into a commercial intellectual property symbol with musical, fashion, and performance appeal, creating a highly popular in-person experience where players were both spectators and participants.

== Reception ==
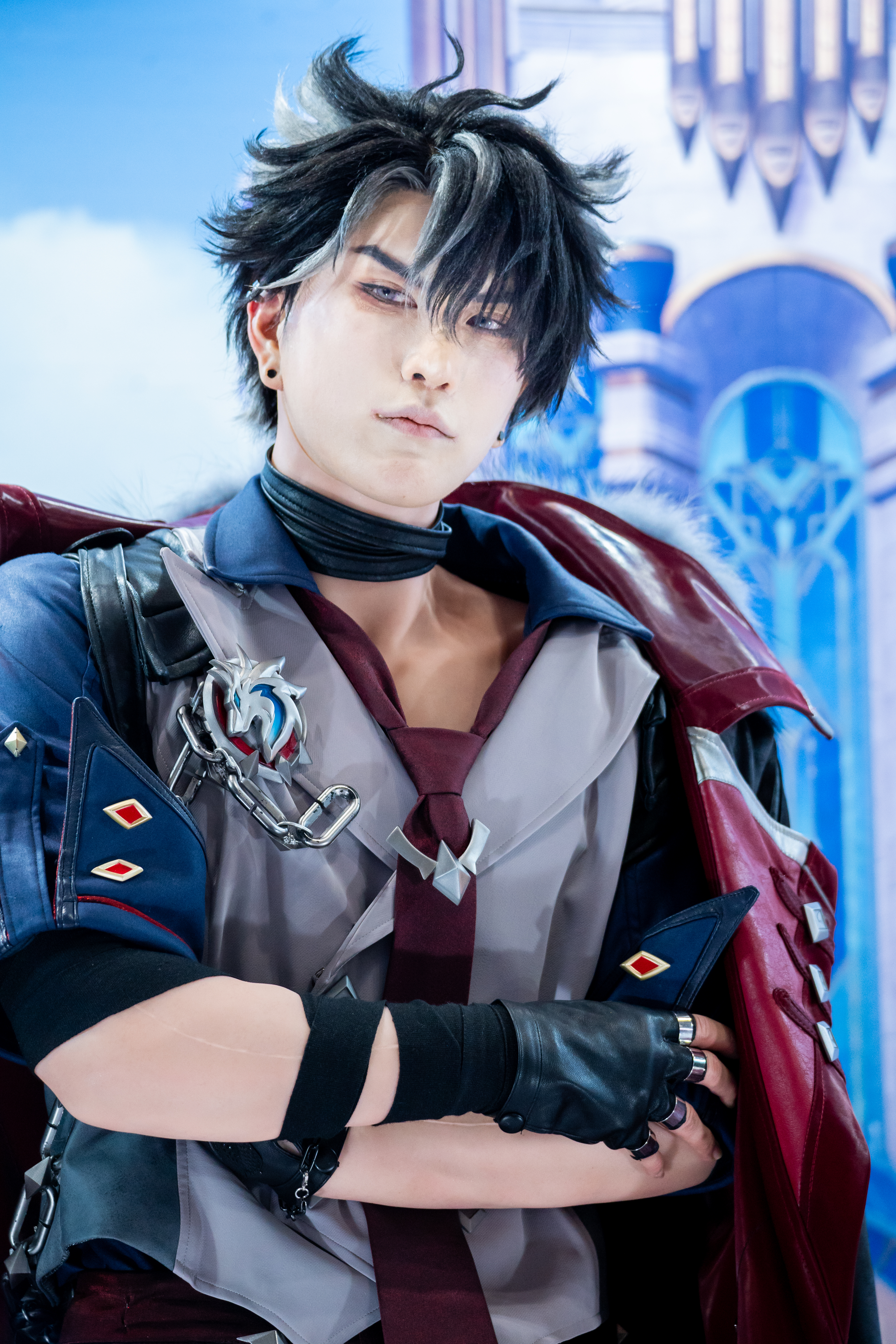
A cosplay of Wriothesley

Wriothesley was received very well. According to statistics, on the second day after Wriothesley became playable, Genshin Impact rose to second place out of all games on the sales rankings of the App Store in Japan. However, Nguyễn Hoàng Thuận of Vietnamese site Lag.vn argued that the character's banner was placed in an unfortunate and awkward position, sandwiched between two characters the community saw as very valuable (Neuvillette and Furina). Among players, Wriothesley's storyline and character design were highly popular, and they inspired a large volume of fan-created works. A large share of these works were not safe for work, which surprised Zieja. A Reddit user also created a highly realistic replica of Wriothesley's gauntlets, which received thousands of upvotes. GameK writer Thế Anh said that Wriothesley's English name derives from a British aristocratic surname and has an unusually difficult spelling and pronunciation, leading players to create numerous humorous nicknames for him including "Wrio", "Winchester" and the pun "Worth the Slay." Players also found that his talents and abilities were well suited to mining certain ores, bridge-building, and creating mods. This prompted a number of funny videos, including one showing a mod that allowed every female character in the game to use Wriothesley's signature boxing attacks, further increasing discussion of Wriothesley and interest in him.

=== Characterization ===
As the game's first Cryo catalyst character, and as someone with a "striking appearance and captivating personality", Wriothesley became one of the most anticipated characters after Fontaine's preview trailer was released. His character story teaser was also met with an enthusiastic response, with players and critics often praising the complexity and depth of his story. Wriothesley plays an important role in the main storyline of Fontaine, where his multifaceted personality became a focal point for both players and reviewers. Although he offers the Traveler friendly assistance, he also displays a cold and ruthless side. Game Rant writer Jackie Brumley observed that Wriothesley demonstrates powerful, serious leadership in the main story: he treats others kindly while concealing secrets. Brumley wrote that his dark past and willingness to personally handle unpleasant problems make him stand out among the game's many characters. Dot Esports writer Eva Martinello similarly described Wriothesley as both "strong and dark" while also possessing a sense of humor in the main storyline.

According to Real Sport 101 writer Silvia Chan, players noticed a charming detail in Wriothesley's character design: during one of his idle animations, the normally stern-looking and rugged Duke of the Fortress of Meropide sighs and tries to peel cute stickers off his gauntlets with his fingernail. Players responded warmly to the contrast between his intimidating appearance and softer side, believing that it further added to his appeal. Chan particularly praised the animation's subtlety, especially the small movements of his fingers as he struggles to scrape the stickers off. The stickers also appear briefly when he uses his Elemental Burst, and the design of the sticker he tries to remove changes each time. Chan concluded that these kinds of cute interactions across characters are an important reason for the game's continued success. Wriothesley also has an unusual speaking habit. He sometimes repeats the same idea twice using slightly different wording, which prompted discussion among players on social media. Sayoko Narita characterized this as "Wriothesley syntax" and said she did not believe this was due to forgetfulness, and compared it to the ways of speaking used by other characters such as Alhaitham.

Sabrine Specker, a researcher at the University of Lausanne compared the different forms of masculinity represented by Wriothesley and Neuvillette using a quantitative survey. The study found that Wriothesley received exceptionally high ratings for his strength, significantly exceeding those of Neuvillette, while also scoring highly in terms of attractiveness. However, his intelligence ratings were notably lower than Neuvillette's, suggesting that his design emphasizes a conventional masculine physique more than an intellectual image. Cisgender male players gave Wriothesley the highest strength ratings of any group, while also assigning him the lowest intelligence ratings; other respondents rated his intelligence higher. Specker therefore argued that Wriothesley reinforces a traditional masculine-leader archetype, with his authority rooted mainly in physical strength, gravitas, and visual appeal. This contrasts sharply with Neuvillette's alternative form of masculinity, whose authority is grounded in kindness, fairness and wisdom.

=== Gameplay ===
In terms of gameplay, critics generally regarded Wriothesley as a powerful Cryo damage dealer whose primary role is to deal damage to enemies. As the game's first Cryo catalyst character, his normal attacks are infused with Cryo, leading reviewers from Yahoo News, Game Rant and HK01 to argue that he introduced a new style of gameplay to Genshin Impact. Wriothesley is a close-range fighter who attacks enemies at short distance with mechanical gauntlets in a boxing-like style. His attack style was also well-received. Sports Illustrated writer Marco Wutz and Game Rant commentator Elara Leclair both compared him to another character in the game, Shikanoin Heizou, but said that Wriothesley feels more like a boxer and has a particularly stylish fighting style. TheGamer writer Raddie Perez wrote that his heavy punches and uppercuts can create novel and entertaining attacks when combined with his own mechanics and player skill. Leclair considered Wriothesley relatively straightforward to use, with considerable potential to deal high damage even without unlocking his Constellations. HK01 writer Lin Zhouheng likewise emphasized that Wriothesley can perform at full effectiveness without Constellations, but also said that the character requires players to fight at close range and therefore demands stronger mechanical skill. He also praised Wriothesley's attack feel as among the game's best. Chan highlighted Wriothesley's mechanic of consuming health to increase damage, describing it as a high-reward playstyle for players who enjoy a challenge.

At the same time, Lin and Yahoo News commentator Yan Ku both said that, although Wriothesley is strong, he is not an overwhelmingly powerful or game-changing character. Leclair also indicated that Wriothesley has a short attack range and that his attacks generally affect only one enemy at a time, making it important to switch targets at the appropriate moment. Chan similarly observed that he lacks strong area-of-effect options and is less effective against groups of enemies. She added that, because he can only fight at close range and must sacrifice his health to increase his damage, he is comparatively vulnerable and more likely to be injured in combat. Nguyễn noted that some players criticized Wriothesley for being the game's first Cryo catalyst character while still primarily fighting with his fists at close range, which they felt conflicted with expectations that catalyst users would rely on long-range energy-based attacks. They also considered his skill effects as insufficiently striking or even dated compared with other, newer characters. They argued that miHoYo would need to improve Wriothesley's visual effects in order to attract more player attention.
