= Tartaglia (Genshin Impact) =

Fictional character in a video game

- Genshin Impact character
- Official artwork
- First game: Genshin Impact (2020)
- Voiced by: EN: Griffin Burns; ZH: Li Chunyin; JA: Ryōhei Kimura; KO: Nam Doh-hyeong

In-universe information
- Full name: Ajax
- Title: Childe
- Position: Eleventh of the Fatui Harbingers
- Weapon: Bow
- Home: Snezhnaya
- Elements: Hydro; Electro (Note: Only when fighting him as a boss. Additionally, he does not have an Electro Vision; rather, he has a Fatui-made "Delusion" which gives him the ability to use Electro. Delusions are said to be more powerful than Visions, but they absorb the wearer's life force.)

Tartaglia (Chinese: 达达利亚; pinyin: Dádálìyǎ), real name Ajax (阿贾克斯; Ājiǎkèsī), is a character from the video game Genshin Impact, developed by miHoYo. He first appears in the Liyue chapter of the main story after the game's release in 2020, and became a playable character that year. He is a member of the Fatui, the diplomatic organization of the fictional nation of Snezhnaya and one of the game's main antagonistic factions. He is the Eleventh of the Fatui Harbingers, with the codename "Childe" (公子; Gōngzǐ; 'young master').

Born in Snezhnaya, he is a brave and battle-loving warrior who is loyal, passionate, and values his family. He has short, messy orange hair and dark blue eyes, wears a grey jacket, and has an earring set with a red gemstone as well as a Fatui mask. In terms of gameplay, he is a Hydro bow user who can freely switch between ranged and melee attack modes. He has a unique mechanic known as Riptide and can deal high amounts of area-of-effect damage. Since his release, Tartaglia has been widely liked by players for his complex personality, sex appeal, and high skill ceiling in combat, and is regarded as one of the most popular antagonists in the game.

== Design and voice acting ==
Tartaglia is the Eleventh of the Fatui Harbingers, with the codename "Childe". He is one of the most dangerous of said group: a brave and battle-loving fighter, but also loyal and passionate. He has messy but neatly trimmed short orange hair and dark blue eyes. He wears an open grey jacket, grey pants, black boots and black gloves. He also wears an earring set with a red gemstone and a red Fatui mask on his head. Tartaglia's name is based on the stock character of the same name in Italian commedia dell'arte.

Tartaglia is voiced in English by Griffin Burns, in Chinese by Li Chunyin, in Japanese by Ryōhei Kimura, and in Korean by Nam Doh-hyeong. In an interview, Kimura said that when he first saw Tartaglia's lines, he felt that he was "quite a difficult character to handle". At first glance, Tartaglia gives off an "airy and composed" impression, but in reality he likes to fight. When Kimura realized this, he thought Tartaglia to be scary. However, Tartaglia's backstory includes an important detail in that he values his family very much. Kimura had originally assumed that a battle maniac like him might not be very gentle toward his family, so he was surprised to find out the opposite was true. He felt that Tartaglia "dotes on" his family, which made him think Tartaglia was "a little unfair", because that contradiction makes it difficult to dislike him completely. Kimura describes himself as a pacifist who tries to avoid conflict as much as possible, and said that the only thing he has in common with Tartaglia is that they both value their families. Regarding his relationship with the protagonist Traveler, Kimura said that Tartaglia is "kind of like a friend, and kind of like an ally" to them, but that they are not completely on the same side. As a member of the Fatui Harbingers, the fact that Tartaglia can become part of the player's party is already something rare and special. Kimura admitted that if Tartaglia were to "completely become a good friend and good companion", he would instead find that "a little lonely". For that reason, he thinks Tartaglia is at his best when he remains "airy and composed, [...] but still sharp when he needs to be". That sort of distance, where he is neither too close nor too distant, is what makes Tartaglia interesting as a character. Kimura also quoted one of Tartaglia's lines in which he indicates that battle scars are a high form of praise for warriors. He praised this attitude of not hiding one's own scars, arguing that it reflects Tartaglia's pride and honor as a warrior. He also mentioned that Tartaglia seems familiar with the concept of acting; although Tartaglia is not a professional actor, he thinks highly of his skills. Kimura felt that this showed Tartaglia as not only a battle maniac, but that he also has a performer side to him.

== Appearances ==
Tartaglia's real name is Ajax. He was born in Morepesok, a town in Snezhnaya, and was named after an adventure hero from his father's favorite stories. At age 14, he ran away from home and accidentally fell into the Abyss. There, he awakened the sleeping monster "All-Devouring Narwhal" and met a swordswoman named Skirk. Ajax became Skirk's disciple and, over three months in the Abyss, learned the techniques for traversing the Abyss. It is here he acquired the Foul Legacy transformation skill he would later use. Due to the difference in the flow of time in the Abyss compared to the outside world, only three days had passed in the outside world. After returning home, Ajax's personality changed drastically: he became frivolous, self-confident, and fond of conflict. He joined the Fatui and earned the appreciation of one of their Harbingers, Pulcinella, who promoted him to the rank of Harbinger himself, where he received his codename. Around that time, the Tsaritsa, Snezhnaya's ruler, gave him his Delusion.

In the game's main story, Tartaglia rescues the protagonist Traveler in Liyue after they are surrounded by the Millelith (local security forces) and are falsely accused of causing the death of the Geo Archon, Rex Lapis (also known as Morax). He then directs the Traveler to seek out the adepti, illuminated beasts, in order to clear their name. After the Traveler is cleared of suspicion, they hope to find a way to approach the Exuvia, Rex Lapis' body. Tartaglia therefore introduces the Traveler to Zhongli, an employee at a local funeral parlor. While the Traveler and Zhongli prepare the Rite of Parting, Tartaglia secretly monitors them and learns that the Exuvia has been taken to the Golden House. His purpose in plotting in Liyue is to obtain Morax's Gnosis (Note: A Gnosis is an internal magical focus used by Archons to manipulate the elements. A Vision is the same, except is an external focus not used by Archons.) which he believes is inside the Exuvia. Tartaglia goes there to seize it, but the Traveler stops him, and the two do battle there. After discovering that the Exuvia does not contain the Gnosis, Tartaglia realizes that there is more to both the Exuvia and the death of the Geo Archon. He decides to summon Osial, a sealed god, in order to force the Geo Archon to reveal themselves. Osial is ultimately defeated through the combined efforts of the Liyue Qixing (the local government) and adepti. Only after returning to the Northland Bank does Tartaglia learn that the entire affair was a setup by Zhongli (who is revealed to in fact be the Geo Archon, and who faked his death) and Signora (another Fatui Harbinger), and that the latter has already obtained the Gnosis.

Later, in Fontaine, Tartaglia is on vacation there and meets the Traveler again. After his Vision suddenly stops working, he tells them about his current situation and what happened to him in childhood. Tartaglia decides to entrust his Vision to the Traveler for the time being for safekeeping. Some time later, Tartaglia is accused of being the mastermind behind several women's disappearances in the area. Although the Traveler and investigator Navia identify the real culprit and clear Tartaglia of suspicion, Tartaglia is still found guilty, and he is sent to the Fortress of Meropide, Fontaine's prison. Arlecchino, another Fatui Harbinger, uses this opportunity to pressure Furina (who claims to be the Hydro Archon; this is later proven false) and Neuvillette (Fontaine's chief justice, or Iudex), leading the latter to send the Traveler to investigate Tartaglia's whereabouts in the Fortress of Meropide, using false charges as an excuse to send the Traveler there without suspicion. During the investigation, the Traveler uses Tartaglia's Vision to learn that Tartaglia has been fighting the All-Devouring Narwhal in the Primordial Sea for quite some time. The monster later attacks the Opera Epiclese (Fontaine's courthouse), and Tartaglia works together with Neuvillette to drive it back into the Primordial Sea. The Traveler and Neuvillette enter the Primordial Sea and do battle against it; finally, Skirk arrives and transfers both the Narwhal and Tartaglia away. He later reappears in Nod-Krai and Snezhnaya.

In Tartaglia's Story Quest, his younger brother Teucer secretly comes to Liyue, and the Traveler, Paimon, and Tartaglia take turns looking after him. Ultimately, in an abandoned research facility, the Traveler is moved by Tartaglia's sense of family, and the two make a promise to meet again in Snezhnaya.

=== Gameplay ===
Tartaglia is a five-star Hydro bow character. His Elemental Skill allows him to switch between two different combat modes: ranged bow attacks and melee attacks using Hydro blades. His Elemental Burst changes depending on the current combat mode: in ranged mode, it unleashes water-like arrows over a large area, while in melee mode, it performs a sweeping slash with a Hydro polearm. Tartaglia also appears as a boss character, during the second phase of which he transforms using a technique called "Foul Legacy - The Devouring Deep".

== Promotion ==
Tartaglia first appeared as a non-player character in version 1.0 of Genshin Impact in the first act of chapter 1 of the game's main story. miHoYo announced in the preview trailer for version 1.1 that he would become a playable character. In November 2020, miHoYo released Tartaglia's character demo, "A Letter to Snezhnaya", and his story teaser "Childe: Sigil of Permission", which demonstrated his gameplay. Tartaglia became playable in version 1.1 of the game, during which his Story Quest was also released. In version 2.2, miHoYo released Tartaglia's signature weapon, Polar Star.

In 2023, miHoYo collaborated with Chinese tech company Xiaomi to create a limited-edition version of the Smart Band 8 Pro watch featuring Tartaglia. Writer Daz Skubich of Pocket Tactics said that the partnership suited miHoYo's slogan, "Tech Otakus Save the World", perfectly. The watch included a 1.74-inch OLED screen, which combined with an improved user interface and battery as well as an affordable price. These factors, Skubich argued, made the watch "more than capable of competing with the best smartwatches on the market."

== Reception ==
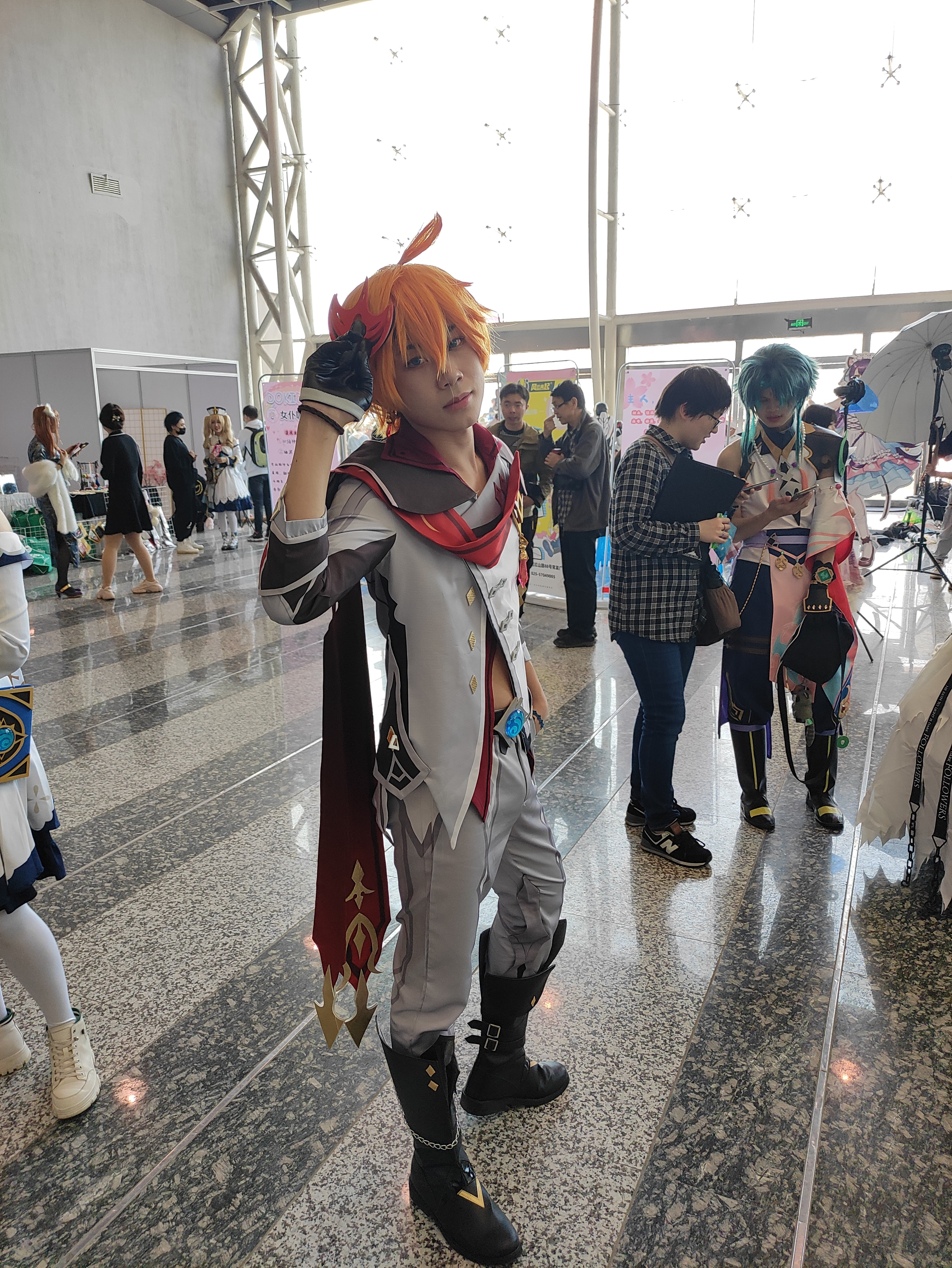
A cosplay of Tartaglia in Nanjing

Since Tartaglia was released as a playable character, players have generally been very fond of him, and he has become one of the game's most popular antagonists. Some players express their love for the character by cosplaying as him, including Susan Tse, a 71-year-old actress, who did so at the 2023 Animation-Comic-Game Hong Kong, which earned her praise from fans.

=== Characterization ===
In terms of characterization, HK01 reporter Lam Cheuk-hang argued that Tartaglia is deeply popular among players because of his handsome appearance and the slightly sinister quality of Kimura's performance. Combined with the contrast between his battle-maniac side and his role as a "family-oriented good older brother", this makes him appealing to both male and female players. Kotaku writer Sisi Jiang praised Tartaglia as a charming and well-written villain, stating that he is "fully aware that he's a glorified assassin and that he's not the hero of his own story, and he's not the least bit sorry about it." As a result, Tartaglia's story breaks from the trope of a villain's self-redemption; he is a villain in an East Asian aesthetic with emotional highlights. Jenni Lada of Siliconera, meanwhile, focused on his everyday interactions, writing that although Tartaglia is a Fatui Harbinger and clearly an enemy in the story, his overall demeanor is unusually fun and likeable. His enthusiasm for gliding and his optimistic, friendly tone make it difficult to associate him with being an enemy. However, Lada also pointed out that Tartaglia occasionally reveals his dangerous side without realizing it, such as when he laments that a place is "pretty dead" because there is nothing to kill, or when he talks about using others as test subjects for his new power in one of his character ascension voice lines. This design, she said, is the core of his appeal as a character; she also called him a rascal. Rice Digital writer Lilia Hellal said Tartaglia was a "walking contradiction", praising his positive traits such as love for his family despite his position, even noting that Tartaglia keeps his affiliation with the Fatui secret from his brother Teucer. She also said that despite his goals of protecting the innocence of children, his moral compass was questionable; she used the fact that he summoned Osial, putting thousands of lives in danger, as an example of this.

Game Rant commentator Matthew D'Onofrio praised Tartaglia's visual design, saying that if Tartaglia competed in a best-dressed competition, he "has a solid chance at winning." Aki Nogishi of Automaton said that Tartaglia's exposed wrists, forearms, and backs of his hands, along with the open hem of his jacket revealing his midriff, already make him sexy. Nogishi argued that the "horizontal belt beneath the chest" shown in his 2022 birthday illustration pushed this quality to its peak. Fans called the belt the "sexy belt" (Japanese: えっちベルト, romanized: ecchi beruto, lit. 'ecchi belt'), and it quickly trended on Twitter. Nogishi said that this seemingly-useless belt instead emphasized Tartaglia's pectorals and abdominal muscles, strengthening his sex appeal and making fans "unable to control their physical desires". Sayoko Narita similarly said that although Tartaglia did not show the belt again in his 2023 birthday illustration, fans caused him to trend on Twitter anyway with a hashtag lamenting the lack of a belt that year. They also paid attention to the "shadow of his collarbone", the "exposed abdomen near the groin" and his "carefree smile shown to his younger brother". Narita concluded that the root of Tartaglia's appeal lies in the contrast between the "beautiful expressions he shows toward his loved ones" and his battle-maniac side. Hellal said Tartaglia was a "blessing to look at".

Jessica Clark Dillon of TheGamer noted that the player community vividly presents Tartaglia's many sides through memes. He is seen very differently by different people: to the people of Liyue and to his family, he is a cheerful and friendly "toy salesman" (referring to one of the covers he uses while conducting secret business) and to others, he is a "badass weekly boss". He is usually gentle, efficient and lethal during missions, and, in a crisis, transforms into a dual-element boss with a cape. His multiple names have also inspired many memes, even drawing comparisons to Deadpool's humorous persona, while Dillon speculated he hides his real name to protect his family. Within the player community, Tartaglia is regarded by many as a husbando candidate and is often paired with the female Traveler, Lumine. He has been described as having all the traits of a "good boyfriend"; he is hardworking, family-oriented and protective.

=== Gameplay ===
Many reviewers praised the design of Tartaglia's combat kit, which allows him to freely switch between ranged and melee combat, as highly distinctive. Yahoo News commentator Yan Ku argued that Tartaglia is one of the most technically-demanding characters in the game because he can switch between ranged and melee stances through his Elemental Skill. As a result, he can flexibly shift between the roles of a main DPS and burst DPS depending on the situation, allowing him to fit well into many different team compositions. Giovanna De Ita of The Nerd Stash also praised the variety of his gameplay, considering him a good choice for any team. PC Gamer commentators Sean Martin and Stacey Henley regarded Tartaglia as one of the game's best Hydro DPS characters. Sanyam Jain of TheGamer argued that Tartaglia, who is deeply loved by players, has stood the test of time: even after miHoYo released many new characters after him, he still has one of the game's most interesting combat kits.

However, some reviews also said that Tartaglia was difficult to play. Lam Cheuk-hang argued that players not only need to precisely control the duration and cooldown of his Elemental Skill, but also need to adjust their attack patterns depending on different playstyles and equipment. As a result, more casual players, or those who do not intend to study his mechanics in depth, may not be suited to pulling for him. Players have also argued that Tartaglia should be played at either zero or six Constellations, because the effects of his first through fifth Constellations are insignificant, while only the sixth changes his gameplay significantly. Christine Choi of Destructoid similarly said that his optimal combos and choice of Elemental Burst form need to be adjusted according to his team and weapon, and that he is not a mindless DPS character. Tartaglia appears as a boss in the main story, but players criticized this boss fight for being overly difficult and hard to handle. Dillon even wrote that it was an achievement to "survive for most of the battle"; miHoYo later reduced the difficulty of the boss fight.
