= Holy Ghost (2014 film) =

- Theatrical release poster
- Directed by: Darren Wilson
- Written by: Darren Wilson
- Produced by: Braden Heckman; Darren Wilson
- Starring: Meredith Andrews; Heidi Baker; Reginald 'Fieldy' Arvizu; DeVon Franklin; Jake Hamilton; Bill Johnson; Brian 'Head' Welch
- Cinematography: Bjorn Amundsen; Andrew Paul Howell; Darren Wilson
- Edited by: Darren Wilson
- Production company: Wanderlust Productions
- Distributed by: Capitol Christian Distribution (DVD); Tugg (Theatrical)
- Release date: September 6, 2014
- Running time: 113 minutes
- Country: United States
- Language: English
- Budget: $357,665

Holy Ghost is a 2014 American Christian documentary film written and directed by Darren Wilson, to take the viewer to locations around the world to see if the Holy Spirit can really lead a film.

== Production ==
Filmmaker Darren Wilson, director of Father of Lights, Finger of God and Furious Love set out to make a movie that was completely inspired by the Holy Spirit. With no set plan, Wilson relied completely on spiritual guidance to lead him wherever the adventure is. He and his team journeyed around the world in search of nature and evidence of the Holy Spirit and to explore the role of the Holy Spirit in art, ministry and Christian life.

The filmmakers had sought $200,000 in financing through Kickstarter and exceeded their goal. The funding campaign began on April 18, 2014, and within 24 hours had raised $77,000. Within 48 hours they had reached $100,000, and exceeded $125,000 after five days. By June 1, 2014 the project had received $357,000.

The film did not rely on a shooting script. Director Wilson "was interested in letting the film build organically instead of having a rigidly pre-determined structure or set interviews." Production ended up with footage enough for two films. Based on having so much footage, a sequel, Holy Ghost Reborn, was released in late 2015.

== Synopsis ==
The film consists of interviews with religious figures as well as musicians, all speaking about the ways their faith informs their work or the miracles they have witnessed.

== Cast ==
Film interviewees include Meredith Andrews, Heidi Baker, Reginald 'Fieldy' Arvizu, DeVon Franklin, Jake Hamilton, Bill Johnson, Brian Johnson, R.T. Kendall, Lenny Kravitz, Banning Liebscher, Jeremy Riddle, Michael W. Smith, Phil Vischer, Kim Walker-Smith, Brian 'Head' Welch, Gary Wilson, and William P. Young, among others.

== Release ==
Wanderlust Productions is partnering with Tugg, a site the allows users to request that a film be brought to their local theaters. Once the theater approves the request, users can sell tickets on a personalized "event page."

Wanderlust CEO Braden Heckman is offering the film free for theatrical viewing due to it being fully funded through Kickstarter, and is expecting that DVD sales will bring future profits. The film raising nearly $360 thousand in 45 days represents the most money raised by a faith-based film in the history of the Kickstarter platform.

The film was shown at the Soul Survivor Summer Festival in the summer of 2014. Darren Wilson introduced it personally before the showing. The film was released September 6, 2014.

== Sequel ==
A sequel, titled Holy Ghost: Reborn was released in 2015

== See also ==
- Korn
