= The VeggieTales Show =

Television series

- Genre: Christian media; Educational; Sketch comedy; Variety; Musical
- Created by: Phil Vischer; Mike Nawrocki
- Based on: VeggieTales
- Voices of: Phil Vischer; Mike Nawrocki; Lisa Vischer; David Mann; Kira Buckland; Stephanie Southerland; Elise Napier; Joe Zieja; Sean Chiplock; Melissa Mabie; Todd Waterman
- Theme music composer: Mike Nawrocki; Lisa Vischer; Phil Vischer; Kurt Heinecke
- Opening theme: "It's the VeggieTales Show"
- Ending theme: "VeggieTales Theme Song 2010 Version" (instrumental)
- Composers: Kurt Heinecke; Michael Demus; Kevin Manthei
- Country of origin: United States
- Original language: English
- No. of seasons: 1
- No. of episodes: 26

Production
- Executive producers: Matt Crouch; Laurie Crouch; Todd Waterman; Leslie Ferrell; Phil Vischer
- Producers: Vincent Aniceto; Eric Newman; Tom Newman
- Editor: Lindsey Myers
- Running time: 24–30 minutes
- Production companies: Trilogy Animation Group; Prana Studios; 88 Pictures; Big Idea Entertainment

Original release
- Network: Trinity Broadcasting Network
- Release: October 22, 2019 – April 1, 2022

Related
- VeggieTales in the City

The VeggieTales Show (often marketed as simply VeggieTales) is an American Christian animated television series created by Phil Vischer and Mike Nawrocki. The series served as a revival and sequel of the American Christian computer-animated franchise VeggieTales. It was produced through the partnerships of TBN, NBCUniversal, Big Idea Entertainment, and Trilogy Animation, and ran from October 22, 2019, to April 1, 2022.

Vischer, Nawrocki, and Lisa Vischer reprised their respective roles as the voices of Bob the Tomato, Larry the Cucumber, and Junior Asparagus, with Kurt Heinecke returning to compose the show's music score. They are joined by the creative team led by show-runner Todd Waterman.

This was the first VeggieTales production to be entirely outsourced following DreamWorks Animation's closure of Big Idea's headquarters in 2017, and the last production to involve the Vischers, Nawrocki and Heinecke before their departure from the franchise in 2021.

== Premise ==
The show focuses on the VeggieTales characters putting on Broadway-style shows in Mr. Nezzer's theater that retell Bible stories and parody mainstream pop-culture. Each episode begins with a question in the form of a letter from a kid, and then Bob and Larry respond to that question by putting on a show. Bob the Tomato attempts to use the show to accomplish his dream of becoming the next Mister Rogers. According to Vischer, "the thing that drives Bob crazy is when Mister Rogers does Mister Rogers, everything goes perfectly. Nothing ever goes wrong on Mister Rogers' Neighborhood. And Bob wants that for his show, but he can never achieve it." Each show never goes the way that Bob had initially planned, resulting in complete and total chaos.

Phil Vischer says "It's really all about Bob and Larry wanting to put on a show for kids. They want to teach things to kids. Bob wants to help kids, Larry wants to help Bob."

Most of these episodes act out stories and lessons from the Bible. Among the show's episodes are a nine-episode arc about the fruit of the Spirit, and stories focusing on LarryBoy and the League of Incredible Vegetables. According to Phil Vischer, the first season consists of 18 episodes in which he would write the first ten and Nawrocki would write the last eight. The series provided VeggieTales content through 2022.

== Characters ==
Phil Vischer stated in a radio interview that no new characters will be created for this television program. In addition to series regulars, characters from VeggieTales spin-offs have appeared, including Callie Flower from VeggieTales in the House and Awful Alvin from Larryboy: The Cartoon Adventures. The VeggieTales Show brings back Mr. Nezzer, as the owner of the theater in which the show takes place, who has been absent from the previous two television shows.

=== Voice cast ===
- Phil Vischer as Bob the Tomato/Thingamabob, Archibald Asparagus/Alfred, Mr. Lunt/S-Cape, Mr. Nezzer (Eps 13–18, 20–26), Jimmy Gourd, Pa Grape, Phillipe Pea, Goliath, Scallion #1, Radio Announcer, Krazy Kenny (2021), Guy Broccoli
- Mike Nawrocki as Larry the Cucumber/LarryBoy, Jerry Gourd, Jean-Claude Pea, Li'l Pea, Scallion #2 & #3, Delivery Veggie, Qwerty, Mother Nezzer, the Milk Money Bandit, Frank, Krazy Kenny/Houston (2022)
- Lisa Vischer as Junior Asparagus/Ricochet
- Kira Buckland as Petunia Rhubarb/Vogue, Laura Carrot
- Stephanie Southerland as Madame Blueberry/Mayor Blueberry, Callie Flower, Miss Minchin
- David Mann as Mr. Nezzer (Eps 1–12, 19)
- Elise Napier as Miss Achmetha
- Joe Zieja as Dr. Flurry, the Emperor of Envy, Jesse, Buttons Crimini
- Sean Chiplock as Scallini, Scooter, Awful Alvin
- Todd Waterman as Khalil
- Melissa Mabie as Adele Pepper

== Production ==
When DreamWorks bought Classic Media and Big Idea Entertainment in 2012, all VeggieTales productions produced at Big Idea were to be controlled and overseen by DreamWorks. As a result, DreamWorks launched production of the Netflix original series VeggieTales in the House in late 2013 and announced that it would shut down production of the original VeggieTales direct-to-DVD series after the release of its 58th episode entitled VeggieTales: Noah's Ark in 2015. DreamWorks replaced the original creative crew that had been working at Big Idea Entertainment for nearly two decades with an entirely new team of nearly 75 artists led under the direction of Doug TenNapel. VeggieTales creators Phil Vischer and Mike Nawrocki were given no control over the creative content of VeggieTales in the House and were only allowed to provide the characters' voices. Since DreamWorks ordered 78 22-minute episodes for VeggieTales in the House in 2013, production of the last 13 episodes wrapped up in the summer of 2017 and DreamWorks' team left Big Idea Entertainment to work on new animated series for Netflix such as Trolls: The Beat Goes On! and Dragons: Rescue Riders. DreamWorks then sold Big Idea Entertainment's headquarters in Franklin, Tennessee once production concluded. While the last season of VeggieTales in the City premiered on Netflix in the fall of 2017, marketing employees continued to work for Big Idea Entertainment.

In 2016, DreamWorks' founder Jeffrey Katzenberg sold the studio to NBCUniversal. As discussions to revise the series began to take place in 2018, NBCUniversal, would now manage Big Idea Entertainment itself as a in-name-only subsidiary through DreamWorks Classics.

In late 2018, Vischer received a phone call from The Trinity Broadcast Network, which was in talks to license VeggieTales from NBCUniversal in order to create a new reboot. TBN, which had been trying to buy VeggieTales for nearly a decade, asked if he would be interested in reprising the voice of Bob the Tomato for the reboot. Vischer said that he wasn't interested in being part of the new reboot unless he had a role in shaping the creative and educational content for the show. As a result, NBCUniversal and TBN allowed him to view an early draft of the pilot. Vischer was encouraged by the fact that the early draft of the pilot reflected the heart of the classic episodes from the original series, instead of VeggieTales in the House and VeggieTales in the City. NBCUniversal and TBN then allowed Vischer to rewrite the pilot. Before long, he and Nawrocki signed on as head-writers, executive producers, and voice actors for the reboot.

As a result of VeggieTales in the House's poor reception, Vischer and Nawrocki made The VeggieTales Show feel as much like the original series as possible, bringing back the original character designs and many members of the creative team from the original series including Big Idea Entertainment's original music director, Kurt Heinecke, and lead storyboard artists/director, Tod Carter. Lisa Vischer, the original voice of Junior Asparagus, also returned from a five-year hiatus to reprise the role.

After a few years away from VeggieTales, Vischer revealed some of his regrets of the original series. According to Vischer, he spent years making VeggieTales "persuade kids to behave Christianly without teaching them Christianity". With this being said, Vischer has made The VeggieTales Show go more theologically in-depth than the previous few series (from the "Netflix era"). It teaches the tenets of Christianity rather than just teaching children to behave morally. Vischer also wouldn't be returning as the voice of Mr. Nezzer as it was announced in late September 2019 that David Mann of Tyler Perry fame would take over the role, though Vischer later filled in as the voice of the character in select episodes.

Due to the high number of iTunes digital downloads for the pilot, "The Best Christmas Gift", as well as the large number of DVDs sold in the first two weeks of its release, TBN ordered an additional eight episodes for the first season on November 1, 2019, bringing the total number of episodes to 26.

== Distribution ==
In 2019, Yippee TV became the exclusive streaming service of The VeggieTales Show, with the plan of releasing episodes monthly and through 2022. The Christmas special premiered on TBN on Christmas Day of 2019. The rest of the series did not begin to broadcast on TBN until January 2022 on Saturday mornings. In February 2022, Big Idea and NBCUniversal partnered with Minno, a Christian children's streaming platform, to stream the series.

Select episodes have been released on DVD, including the pilot episode The Best Christmas Gift in 2019 and three episodes within the Fruit of the Spirit Stories Vol. 1 in 2021. On April 14, 2025, NBCUniversal — the current owner of Big Idea Entertainment and the VeggieTales franchise — released The VeggieTales Show: The Complete Series on TVOD platforms. A DVD edition followed the following day. The release was distributed through Universal Pictures Home Entertainment and is listed on the official Universal Pictures at Home website.

== Setting ==
The show takes place in a theater that is owned by Mr. Nezzer. The VeggieTales characters perform on a broadway-style stage. There are other veggies watching the show from the seats in the auditorium and balconies. There is also a backstage area in which the VeggieTales characters plan and practice the shows. It is inspired by the setting of The Muppet Show, with similarities in visual and conceptual design to the Muppet Theater and its backstage area.

== Episodes ==
No.	Title	Bible Story	Directed by	Written by	Original Release Date	TBN Air Date
1	"The Best Christmas Gift"	Jesus' Birth (the Nativity Story)	Todd Waterman	Phil Vischer	October 15, 2019	December 25, 2019
Bob the Tomato directs his first Christmas special at the new Nezzer Theater. But when he receives a letter from a young fan who's having a difficult holiday season, Bob begins to wonder what's the point of celebrating Christmas when so much is wrong in the world? Larry and the rest of the gang band together to put on a spectacular show reminding the audience (and Bob) that the promise of Christmas is God with us in the bad times, and God with us to END the bad times! Lesson: God Being With Us (the True Meaning of Christmas) Notes: This was the original pilot episode for the series. However, this was the first episode to enter production and to be released in order to make the 2019 Christmas season. This is also the only episode to feature "The VeggieTales Theme Song".
2	"God Wants Us to Make Peace" "The New VeggieTales Show"	Abraham and Lot	Todd Waterman	Phil Vischer	February 28, 2020	February 12, 2022
Bob the Tomato pitches billionaire Mr. Nezzer a new series idea and asks him for permission to use his theater. Nezzer grants Bob access to his theater on one condition, that he brings back the entire original cast of "VeggieTales" for the new show. Bob is reluctant to bring back the original cast because they were dysfunctional, never followed his directions, and always messed things up in each episode of the previous VeggieTales series. Believing he learned from his mistakes from the previous series, Bob makes it his sole duty to put himself and his ideas first in order to have a good and successful show. The cast auditions and pitches ideas for the show, but each of them conflict with Bob's me first attitude. It is only when Pa Grape shares the story of Abraham who chooses to make peace with his nephew Lot that Bob learns a valuable lesson in making peace with his cast members. Lesson: Getting Along With Others (Fruit of the Spirit: Peace) Note: This episode that sets up the series premise of Mr. Nezzer giving Bob the Tomato the keys to his theater for the new show. This was the second episode to be placed into production and be released in order for the Christmas episode to make the 2019 Christmas season.
3	"A Lifetime Supply of Joy"	Paul and Silas	Guy Vasilovich	Phil Vischer	March 30, 2020	February 12, 2022
Larry the Cucumber is a finalist to receive a lifetime supply of Doodle-Whoppers Cookies! Now he can finally be happy! But when Junior Asparagus is revealed as the other finalist, Bob determines that both veggie friends need a lesson in the true meaning of "joy" — happiness that lasts. Bob rallies the veggies for a performance on the story of Paul and Silas — two friends who remained joyful even in the midst of a prison sentence. Lesson: Having a Happy Heart (Fruit of the Spirit: Joy) Silly Songs With Larry: "The Agitated Song" Notes: This episode marks the return of the popular "Silly Songs With Larry" segment after a five-year hiatus since 2015, and the first instance of a character from the Netflix series (Callie Flower) being ported over to the new show.
4	"The Power of Love"	Ruth and Naomi	Todd Watermann	Phil Vischer	April 28, 2020	February 26, 2022
As the cast discusses ideas for the night's show, Laura Carrot runs into the theater declaring her love for teen singing idol Jimmy Lucky. Laura believes that true love is a warm and gushy feeling you have inside you. However, Petunia teaches Laura what true love actually is through the Bible story of Ruth, Naomi, and Boaz. Lesson: Love That You Do (Fruit of the Spirit: Love) Note: This is the first VeggieTales production to feature the new 2020 Big Idea logo. Note 2: There was a technical error on TBN's Yippee Streaming service for the release date of this episode. This episode was originally released a month early on April 2, 2020. NBCUniversal, Big Idea Entertainment, and TBN had scheduled this episode to be released on May 1, 2020. As a result, this episode was removed from the service 24 hours later when the company realized the mistake. It was re-released on May 1, 2020.
5	"It's Cool to Be Kind"	Peter, John, and the Lame Beggar	Guy Vasilovich	Phil Vischer	May 29, 2020	February 19, 2022
Callie Flower has a family problem and attempts to tell the rest of the cast. However, the cast are too occupied with answering a fan's question for the night's show to pay attention to Callie. The question they are trying to answer is "how to make the world a better place". Jimmy and Jerry believe the best way to make the world a better place is through an invention that feeds the poor. Pa Grape on the other hand believes the best example of making the world a better place is the Bible story of Peter, John, and the lame beggar. Lesson: Helping Others (Fruit of the Spirit: Kindness) Silly Songs With Larry: "Amazing Glazed"
6	"A ShakeSparagus Play"	The Madness of King Nebuchadnezzar	Todd Waterman	Sean Gaffney	June 30, 2020	February 19, 2022
Mr. Nezzer is approached by renowned playwright, ShakeSparagus, who was extremely impressed by Larry's performance in the last show. As a result, ShakeSparagus gives Nezzer the script to his new play entitled "MacCheese" and wants Larry to play the lead. However, being the main star of ShakeSparagus' new play goes to Larry's head. His pride causes Larry to ruin the play and to hurt the feelings of the other cast mates. Bob decides to teach Larry a lesson in humility through the Bible story of the Madness of King Nebuchadnezzar. Lesson: Humility
7	"When Being Good Means Giving Up"	The Parable of the Foolish Rich Man	Guy Vasilovich	Phil Vischer	July 30, 2020	February 19, 2022
As the cast prepares for the night's show, Larry vows to never be "good" again after his good deed causes him to miss out on getting the new L-1 Mark 5, a collector's item of the popular robot from the tv show "Space Rangers of Durble". Mr. Lunt takes this opportunity to convince Bob to allow him to advertise his new product "Mr. Lunt's Robot Call" to the audience throughout the entire show. As Mr. Lunt's product goes awry, Pa Grape steps in to teach Larry a lesson of goodness through a western version of the Bible parable of the Foolish Rich Man. Lesson: "What is Really Good" (Fruit of the Spirit: Goodness)
8	"Little Things Matter"	The Parable of the Talents & David and Jonathan	Todd Waterman	Phil Vischer	September 1, 2020	September 17, 2022
As the cast prepares for the night's show, Madame Blueberry returns from vacation and discovers her prized plant had died. She becomes furious at Junior because he promised to water her plant when she was on vacation. Junior thought it was no big deal since it was just a plant and not very big or important. Pa Grape steps in to teach Junior a lesson of faithfulness by putting on a play about a record producer who gives his two interns a small task to do. This is the retelling of the Bible parable of the Talents. Afterwards, Archibald the Asparagus tells the Bible story of David and Jonathan. Lesson: "Being Faithful" (Fruit of the Spirit: Faithfulness) Silly Songs With Larry: "Wanna Wallaby"
9	"Patience Takes Practice"	Noah's Ark	Todd Waterman	Mike Nawrocki	September 30, 2020	January 8, 2022
Larry the Cucumber completes his script about the Wright Brothers and wants it to be performed for next week's show so he could carefully build a replica of the Wright Flyer. However, Bob the Tomato moves Larry's play up for that night's show because he did not prepare any script and fears that Mr. Nezzer will replace him with the mailman as director of the theater. The mailman is much faster at his job than Bob is at his. As a result, Bob rushes the construction of the replica of the Wright Flyer. This causes it to completely fall apart and injure the actors on stage. Petunia Rhubarb then takes control of the show and decides to teach Bob and the audience a lesson in patience through the Bible story of Noah's Ark. Lesson: "Being Patient" (Fruit of the Spirit: Patience)
10	"Being Gentle Makes You Great"	King Rehoboam	Todd Waterman	Phil Vischer	October 30, 2020	February 12, 2022
Jimmy and Jerry Gourd have ruined some of the Veggie show costumes by washing them on the heavy duty, extra-hard cycle. Bob is awfully frustrated and he is not gentle with his reply to Jimmy and Jerry. But they were only trying to help! It makes for a good time for a lesson about gentle actions and gentle words. It is through the story of King Rehoboam in the Bible that the Veggies learn the meaning and importance of gentleness. As a result relationships are mended and the crew is happily back together again. Lesson: "Being Tenderhearted" (Fruit of the Spirit: Gentleness) Silly Songs With Larry: "Oh Pluto"
11	"LarryBoy and the Cape-Coat Caper"	N/A	Guy Vasilovich	Adam Beechen	November 23, 2020	February 26, 2022
When LarryBoy's biggest super-fan, Callie Flower, accidentally wrecks the LarryMobile, she makes a not-so-good choice and lies, making up a story about how the accident happened. Callie's lie causes trouble for LarryBoy and the residents of Bumblyburg lose faith in their superhero. Callie sees the hurt she has caused and tells the truth about the accident. Callie learns a valuable lesson straight from God's word: always tell the truth! Note: This is the first episode to not take place in Mr. Nezzer's Theater (except for the Theme Song). Lesson: Telling the Truth
12	"The Wonderfulness of Wisdom"	David, Abigail and Nabal	Tod Carter	Phil Vischer	December 31, 2020	March 5, 2022
Excited about his new smart phone, Larry believes access to more knowledge will solve all his problems. Pa Grape and Blueberry suggest there might be something even more important than knowledge - wisdom. Dr. Flurry demonstrates the difference between knowledge and wisdom with an animal show starring Jimmy and Jerry that goes horribly wrong. Petunia launches a retelling of the biblical story of Abigail and Nabal where the Veggies learn that being wise is something really valuable. Lesson: Wisdom
13	"Forgiveness Brings the Fixing"	The Prodigal Son	Guy Vasilovich	Phil Vischer	February 1, 2021	February 5, 2022
Larry wants to play his new kazoo in the show, but his kazoo is broken. Junior and Laura are determined to do their space show but it goes horribly wrong and spoils their friendship. It seems that so many things are breaking on the Veggie set. Pa Grape suggests the story of the Prodigal Son to learn about how to fix broken friendships. Join the Veggies as they learn the importance of forgiveness in mending a friendship that is broken. Lesson: Forgiveness Notes: This episode marks the first time that Phil Vischer has voiced Mr. Nezzer since Veggies in Space: The Fennel Frontier.
14	"A Tale of True Courage"	Nehemiah	Guy Vasilovich	Mike Nawrocki	February 26, 2021	April 16, 2022
When Madame Blueberry develops a bad case of the hiccups, the opera she is set to perform is called off. Callie, a cauliflower with a flowery voice, would be a perfect substitution if not for her terrible stage fright. The Veggie crew hears the story of Nehemiah's bravery and while Callie watches from the stage wings, she is inspired to be brave too. Lesson: Being Brave
15	"Samson's Bad Hair Day"	Samson / Daniel	Tod Carter	Mike Nawrocki	April 1, 2021	September 24, 2022
Mr. Lunt has been growing out his hair which gives him the perfect opportunity to star as Samson in the new play for Mr. Nezzer's theater. Bob thinks it is the perfect idea for learning a lesson on self-control. The problem is, Samson broke all of his promises and ended up not being very self-controlled at all! The Veggies finally land on the story of Daniel for an on point lesson on self-control that delivers. No lion! Note: Mr Nezzer sings the theme song with the others in Jimmy's place because he was sleeping. Lesson: Self-Control
16	"The Giving-est Day"	Jesus Feeding The 5000	Tod Carter	Phil Vischer	April 30, 2021	January 29, 2022
After buying a large bag of mini donuts, Larry refuses to share them with the rest of his cast mates. In order to teach Larry a lesson in generosity, Pa Grape tells the story of Fernand King of the Mellons. After, Petunia has the cast perform the story of Jesus feeding the 5000 on stage. It explains how they can live a life of abundance when they trust in God. Silly Songs with Larry: "Tooth Sweater" Lesson: Generosity
17	"The Good Shepherd"	David and Goliath / The Good Shepherd	Tod Carter	Sean Gaffney and Eric Newman	May 27, 2021	March 5, 2022
The Veggies are asked to perform for Mr. Nezzer's mother who is visiting. Performing her favorite story of David and Goliath seems the perfect fit. Mr. Nezzer keeps interfering with the show rehearsal and causes a blackout in the theater. The Veggies are completely in the dark and feeling afraid! Mother Nezzer saves the day with a story of The Good Shepherd and how we can always trust in God's care. Silly Songs with Larry: "Sleep Singing" Lesson: Handling Fear
18	"The One and Only You!"	Peter and Cornelius	Denis Morella	Phil Vischer	June 30, 2021	February 5, 2022
Larry, Junior and Laura went to a parade and came back to tell all of their Veggie buddies about the marching bands, balloons and the many interesting and important people in the parade like a fireman, a policeman and even an astronaut. Meanwhile, Laura admits that she sometimes feels pretty ordinary. She wonders if God sees her and cares about her. It is through the story of Peter and Cornelius that Laura learns that God's love really is for everyone and that he cares about each one of us. Silly Songs with Larry: "Alligator Family" Lesson: Being Loved
19	"LarryBoy and the Angry Eyebrows Trouble"	N/A	Lane Lueras	Kent Redeker (original story) and Sean Gaffney	July 30, 2021	January 8, 2022
When supervillain Awful Alvin unleashes his angry eyebrows on Bumblyburg, it is up to LarryBoy to save the city. Ultimately, even LarryBoy falls victim to the angry eyebrows effects and all seems lost for Bumblyburg with everyone arguing all the time. Just in time, Alfred discovers a cure for anger and together with LarryBoy they help everyone exchange anger for blessings. Lesson: Controlling Anger
20	"Don't Give Up On Doing Good"	David and Saul	Tod Carter	Phil Vischer	August 31, 2021	February 5, 2022
Bob is fed up. His show is languishing in second place, while his cross-town rival, Guy Broccoli, is in first place and getting all kinds of attention. Bob wants his show to have first place! Bob sees an opportunity to win by stopping Guy Broccoli from getting to his show! Pa Grape intervenes to tell the story of David who could have stopped his enemy, King Saul, by doing something wrong – yet David ultimately chose to do what was right. In the end we learn to trust God and to never grow weary in doing what's right and good. Lesson: Perseverance
21	"Don't Stop Believing"	Abraham and Sarah	Lane Lueras	Phil Vischer	October 1, 2021	March 12, 2022
The Veggies receive a letter from the Veggie Fan Club where the fan asks for help on understanding what "faith" looks like and how to practice it in their everyday lives. Does having faith mean believing really hard or believing in impossible things? Pa Grape suggests the Veggies act out the story of Abraham and Sarah. They trusted God for a child even when it seemed impossible. Their faith in God helps us all learn about how to practice faith in God every day in big things and in small things. Lesson: Faith
22	"LarryBoy and the Emperor of Envy"	N/A	Lane Lueras	Sean Gaffney and Graham W. Stephen	October 29, 2021	TBA
The Emperor of Envy wants to be bigger and better than everyone in Bumblyburg! But first, he must deal with the League of Incredible Vegetables. The Emperor comes up with a devious plan and decides to infect each of the League members with his envy formula. As a result the League is weakened and split apart by their envy of each other. To save Bumblyburg, the League must put aside their envy and choose to be grateful for the way God made them. Lesson: Thankfulness
23	"Naaman Takes a Bath"	Naaman and Elisha	Denis Morella	Cory Edwards and Vicki Edwards	December 31, 2021	March 26, 2022
Laura Carrot is Bob's apprentice and training as Bob's "Assistant Stage Manager". But throughout the show Laura is having a hard time following Bob's directions. The Veggies perform the story of Naaman, a proud man with leprosy, who refused to perform a simple ritual to be healed by God. When Naaman learns the consequences of not following directions, Laura similarly realizes how not following directions leads to all kinds of trouble on the set. Lesson: Obedience
24	"LarryBoy and the Menacing Mushroom"	N/A	Lane Lueras	Len Uhley and Lane Lueras	January 31, 2022	March 19, 2022
A tabloid TV reporter, Adele Pepper, gives The League of Incredible Vegetables non-stop coverage, ostensibly to celebrate their exploits. In fact, she's an accomplice of Buttons Crimini, a grudge-bearing criminal mushroom! Buttons Crimini is determined to sow seeds of discord among the Leaguers and break up the team of the Incredible Vegetables with their infighting. He figures that LarryBoy and the rest of the League will be so busy fighting that they won't be able to stop his takeover of Bumblyburg! Ricochet exposes the plot, and with Alfred's help they convince LarryBoy, Thingamabob, Vogue and S-Cape to "forgive one another and walk in love." The teammates reunite in time to thwart Buttons Crimini's evil plan. Lesson: Forgiving and Forgetting
25	"LarryBoy and Awful Alvin's Grudge"	N/A	Tod Carter	Len Uhley	March 1, 2022	March 12, 2022
A series of strange weather events devastates the city of Bumblyburg. When the League of Incredible Vegetables is called to help, the league's captain Larryboy takes charge. However, his decisions leads to the rest of the league's hero's to suffer major injuries and be hospitalized. This causes Larryboy to question his role as a superhero and believes it would be best for the safety of the city if he quits. As Awful Alvin threatens to flood Bumblyburg by busting the Bumblyburg dam, LarryBoy must learn a lesson in perseverance in order to save the city. Lesson: Not Giving Up
26	"The Grumble Cure"	The Story of Moses	Lane Lueras	Cory Edwards	April 1, 2022	March 5, 2022
After nearly two years of doing shows, Mr. Nezzer's theater is beginning to fall apart with leaky pipes, power outages, and cracks in the walls and roof. The leaky pipes damage the costumes and props, causing Bob to have to change the night's show. He quickly replaces the opening act of the show with a song by Jimmy and Jerry, but the performance is ruined as the stage collapses. As Bob complains about the terrible conditions of the show, Pa Grape tells the story of Moses for the second act of the show to help Bob learn a lesson about being content and to stop complaining. Lesson: Gratitude
