= Neuvillette (Genshin Impact) =

Fictional character in Genshin Impact

- Genshin Impact character
- First game: Genshin Impact (2023)
- Voiced by: ZH: Sang Yuze; EN: Ray Chase; JA: Hiroshi Kamiya; KO: Kwak Yoon-sang

In-universe information
- Species: Dragon
- Occupation: Judge
- Weapon: Catalyst
- Home: Fontaine
- Element: Hydro

Neuvillette (/ˌnɜːrvɪˈlɛt/ NUR-vil-ET; Chinese: 那维莱特; pinyin: Nàwéiláitè) is a character from the video game Genshin Impact. He debuted in the game's version 4.0 update in 2023, and was released as a playable character the same year. He is the Chief Justice, or "Iudex" and de facto ruler of the nation of Fontaine, as well as the elemental Dragon Sovereign who wields the power of Hydro. Neuvillette was received well by the community for his elegant design, powerful gameplay, and distinctive voice performance, though his popularity was briefly overshadowed by backlash to a Version 4.8 bug fix that reduced his Charged Attack's effectiveness before HoYoverse reversed the change following player criticism.

== Design and voice acting ==
Neuvillette is the chief justice, or Iudex, of Fontaine. He is serious, earnest, rarely smiles, and is deeply loved by the people. In his character artwork, Neuvillette was seen to not have a Vision, prompting speculation about his true identity. Before Furina's identity as the Hydro Archon was unveiled, many players assumed it would be Neuvillette. Following the release of version 4.1, it was revealed in the main storyline that Neuvillette was actually the Hydro Dragon Sovereign, one of the original elemental authorities of Teyvat, and that he was not yet in his "complete" form. One of his lines hinted that the Hydro Archon Focalors would later kill herself and return the authority over Hydro to him. Another one of his lines states even more directly that he had taken said authority from a usurper and that he was now a complete dragon, sparking intense discussion among players. After version 4.2 was released, player's speculation was confirmed as accurate; Focalors did kill herself and Neuvillette became a complete dragon. Neuvillette is the first playable Dragon Sovereign character in the game. In January 2026, a new outfit was released for Neuvillette, which players could purchase from the in-game shop.

Neuvillette is voiced by Ray Chase in English and Hiroshi Kamiya in Japanese. Chase said in a Reddit AMA that he originally thought of Neuvillette as being "strict and fed-up" in his conversations with Furina, and realized later that the character needed to show more vulnerability. After discussion with members of the English dubbing team, they changed his voice to something softer and deeper to reflect this. In another comment, he expressed gratitude that the character "turned out to be more interesting" than a judge. On the other hand, Kamiya stated in a special message for the game's fifth anniversary that Neuvillette did not show a lot of emotion in his dialogue, which made recording his lines difficult. Additionally, Neuvillette's lines were complex in nature and the tone was difficult to balance for Kamiya. He analyzed the character as "rational to a fault, distant from human emotions" but noted that Neuvillette began to understand humans better as he interacted with them, and Kamiya's acting reflected this.

The character is voiced by Sang Yuze in Chinese, and Kwak Yoon-sang in Korean.

== Appearances ==
=== Story ===
Neuvillette is one of the central characters in the Fontaine chapter of Genshin Impact. He is the reincarnation of the original Hydro Dragon Sovereign of Teyvat. The original Hydro Dragon Sovereign died in a war, during which its elemental power was usurped and given to the Hydro Archon. Because the Bathysmal Vishaps of Enkanomiya, in Inazuma, evolved to possess power over Cryo and Electro, diluting the purity of Hydro, a new Hydro Dragon, Neuvillette, was born in human form. At the invitation of the Hydro Archon Focalors, and to understand his own existence as a "human-shaped dragon", Neuvillette took up the position of Iudex of Fontaine. More than four hundred years prior to the game's events, Neuvillette worked with two trusted subordinates, a Melusine named Carole and Vautrin, who was a captain in the Special Security and Surveillance Patrol, to promote institutional reform. However, they were framed in a conspiracy by radical conservatives. In the end, both Carole and Vautrin met tragic fates, and Neuvillette could not protect them. This experience was very painful and regretful for him, and also made him hesitant about being accepted by humans.

In Fontaine's storyline, the protagonist Traveler meets Neuvillette for the first time in the Opera Epiclese, where Fontaine's trials are held. After two criminal trials, the Traveler learns of a prophecy foretelling the dissolution and destruction of Fontaine's people. Neuvillette befriends the Traveler and helps answer questions about their missing sibling. When the Fatui intervene, Neuvillette enlists the Traveler's help to investigate the disappearance of Tartaglia at Fontaine's undersea prison, the Fortress of Meropide. Through dealings with the warden, Wriothesley, the Traveler comes to realize the gravity of the prophecy. Later, when the dam at the Fortress of Meropide bursts, Neuvillette personally intervenes to seal it and reveals his true identity as the Hydro Dragon Sovereign. As the crisis escalates, Neuvillette and the Traveler conduct a trial against Furina to uncover the truth about her, only to witness the true Hydro Archon Focalors sacrifice herself, destroying the divine throne of the Hydro Archon and returning the usurped elemental authority over Hydro to Neuvillette and completing his transformation into a "true dragon". In his complete form, Neuvillette and the Traveler defeat the villainous "All-Devouring Narwhal" which was the source of the prophecy, saving Fontaine and its people. After Furina abdicates the position of Hydro Archon, Neuvillette assumes full governance over Fontaine. He later joins all of Teyvat in protecting the world against the Nails of Retribution. (Note: The Nails of Retribution are giant nails hanging in the sky, created by Celestia, to combat deviations from a divine plan made by the Heavenly Principles, Teyvat's ruler.)

In Neuvillette's Story Quest, he personally intervenes in an investigation after a Melusine named Kiara receives a threatening letter. During the investigation, the Traveler protects Kiara, and together with Neuvillette uses the Fountain of Lucine to read the emotions which are in the water. They discover that the threatening letter is connected to a smuggling case, eventually tracing it to the mastermind, a cowardly prisoner by the name of Domenico. According to Wriothesley, Neuvillette's former subordinate Vautrin had used radical actions four hundred years prior to highlight Neuvillette's impartiality, and later founded a mutual aid society in the Fortress of Meropide that still exists. Wriothesley points out that humanity's attitude toward the Melusines reflects its judgement of Neuvillettte: over the past four hundred years, people have gradually come to trust and accept both him and the Melusines. Neuvillette recalls the sacrifices made by Carole and Vautrin, and, overcome with grief, causes rain to fall for a time before finally finding release, after which the sky clears. The incident ends peacefully, and Kiara remains unharmed.

=== Gameplay ===
Neuvillette is a five-star Hydro character who wields a catalyst in combat. His Charged Attack consumes his health to unleash a powerful torrent that strikes all enemies in a singular linear path, while his Elemental Skill and Elemental Burst generate objects that can be absorbed during Charged Attacks to restore health and shorten the time it takes to charge the attack up.

After his release in version 4.1 of the game, players discovered that Neuvillette's Charged Attack could be exploited by rapidly rotating the camera, significantly expanding his attack range. This mechanic, present for several patches, was fixed in version 4.8 without prior notice. There was backlash due to the suddenness of this change, prompting HoYoverse to issue an apology the next day and reverse the change.

== Promotion ==
Neuvillette first appeared in a preview trailer entitled "Overture Teaser: The Final Feast" released on July 3, 2023, along with other characters from Fontaine. He was later introduced as a non-player character in version 4.0 of the game alongside the release of Fontaine. Developer miHoYo unveiled his character artwork and profile on August 14 followed by a character teaser on September 21 and a character demo showcasing his combat abilities on September 26. Neuvillette became playable in version 4.1 alongside his signature weapon.

== Reception ==
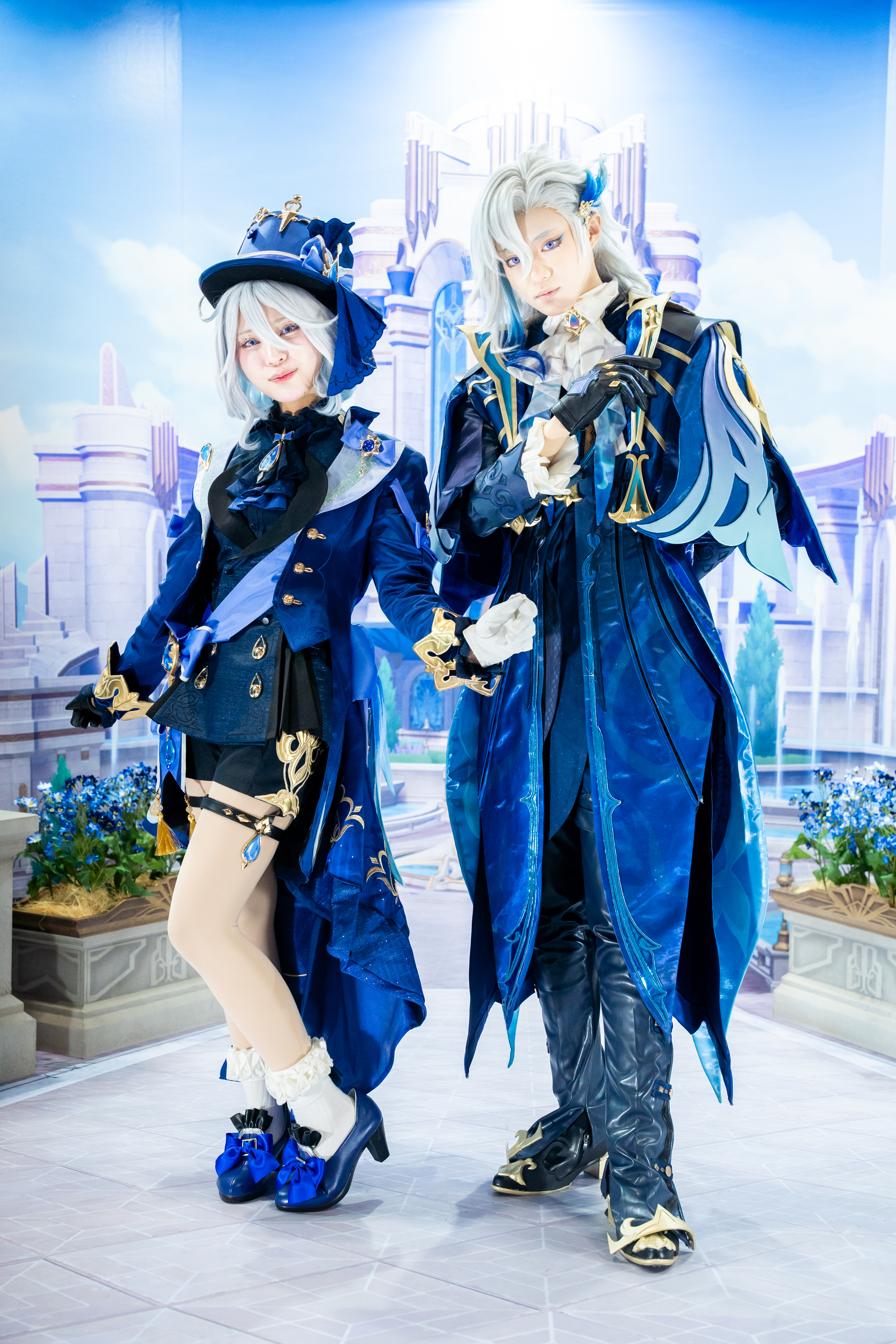
Cosplays of Furina (left) and Neuvillette (right)

Neuvillette was released as a playable character on September 27, 2023, and received generally positively reviews by critics and fans. Players showed appreciation for him via cosplay. The first day after he was released, Genshin Impact earned more than US$3 million in revenue for miHoYo. Kaycee Fay of Dot Esports described Neuvillette as an impressive character when his trailer was first released. She compared him to the existing Archon characters in terms of both gameplay story significance, suggesting that his status as a dragon would influence his playstyle once released.

=== Characterization ===
A study from Telkom University analyzed Neuvillette's visual design using what is called the Manga Matrix method. The paper states that features such as Neuvillette's inverted-triangle face, narrow purple eyes, long white hair and blue horn-like accessories successfully reflect his identity as the Hydro Dragon Sovereign and the Iudex of Fontaine. The study argues that his European aristocratic-style blue robe, color palette evoking the element of Hydro, and stern, restrained expression are all highly consistent with his just, calm, and authoritative personality. It concludes that this close integration of visual design and narrative helps strengthen players' emotional connection and immersion. Sabrine Specker of the University of Lausanne, meanwhile, used a quantitative questionnaire survey to compare the different presentations of masculinity in Neuvillette and Wriothesley. The study found that while players rated Neuvillette extremely highly in terms of intelligence and decisiveness, his strength rating what significantly lower than Wriothesley's. Players who identified as cisgender males gave Neuvillette the lowest strength rating, but the highest scores for decisiveness and cunning, suggesting that they viewed him as an intellectual authority rather than a traditional muscular leader. Specker therefore argues that Neuvillette challenges the conventional masculine image of male leadership, offering an alternative form of masculinity that establishes authority through kindness, fairness, and wisdom. An editor from Gamersky felt that Neuvillette's new outfit showed significant improvements in modeling details, especially in the texture of his hair and the refinement of his face. However, they considered the model in his Elemental Burst animation somewhat stiff, and felt that the proportions of his long legs were awkward, making these flaws in an otherwise strong design.

Neuvillette achieved viral fame because of Ray Chase's rhythmic delivery of the phrase "Oratrice Mecanique d'Analyse Cardinale" in the game's voice lines, which became a viral Internet meme on TikTok. Kenneth Shepard of Kotaku compared this to the use of iambic pentameter in William Shakespeare's plays, noting its ability to sync humorously with songs such as "Another One Bites the Dust" by British rock band Queen. One TikTok post using the voice line surpassed 6.4 million views as of February 2024, and Chase himself also participated in the trend. Ana Diaz of Polygon observed that most of these TikTok posts featured users performing exaggerated dances when the line was spoken and standing still during other moments, emphasizing the line's rhythmic comedic appeal. Catrina-Claudia Mihu compared Neuvillette's Chinese and English voice lines in her research. The original Chinese line (凡高大者，我无不蔑视; Fán gāodà zhě, wǒ wúbù mièshì; 'I despise anything and everything that is imposing') directly and forcefully expresses contempt and disdain toward those in power, presenting the character as sharp and proud; the English translation ("Let the mighty be humbled") instead uses a passive structure, making the tone more indirect and restrained. Mihu argues that this reflects Chinese culture's greater acceptance of direct expressions of contempt, as well as English-speaking cultures' preference for more indirect speech. This difference in translation may affect how players who speak different languages perceive Neuvillette's personality: Chinese-speaking players may sense his majesty and confrontational nature, while English-speaking ones may see him as calm and restrained.

Mitsuhiro Katamura of Real Sound considered Neuvillette's Story Quest structurally unusual because it completely omits combat sequences and focuses entirely on his inner world. Katamura says that the quest deeply portrays Neuvillette's shift from loneliness and repression toward gradually accepting human society by contrasting the tragedy from four hundred years earlier, when he and his subordinates Carole and Vautrin promoted institutional reform only to be framed, with the present-day incident involving threats against the Melusines, in which the people of Fontaine spontaneously help resolve the problem. Katamura especially praised Hiroshi Kamiya's superb performance, arguing that subtle changes in his voice alone allow players to feel that Neuvillette has become more integrated into human society over the course of his long life that he realizes. At the end of the article, Katamura interprets the moment when Neuvillette actively approaches the Traveler and gives a natural smile at the end of the quest as symbolizing that Neuvillette has finally allowed himself to befriend the Traveler. Katamura therefore praised the development team's confidence and dedication to Neuvillette's portrayal, arguing that depicting the inner life of a symbolic figure of an entire nation so thoroughly makes Fontaine's worldbuilding much deeper.

=== Gameplay mechanics and community backlash ===
After his release, Neuvillette's Charged Attack became a defining aspect of his playstyle, allowing players to spin the camera around rapidly to deal damage across a wide area. Stephanie Liu of Siliconera praised the attack as "insane". In version 4.8 of the game, HoYoverse implemented a bug fix so as to "standardize the Neuvillette experience" for all players, but the change lowered Neuvillette's damage potential and players reported that it made him "clunky" to use. On certain platforms, his damage was also limited due to external factors such as mouse settings. The patch reduced the maximum camera speed while Neuvillette used his Charged Attack. miHoYo did not give players prior notice of this change in the patch notes, which angered the community. Liu and others noted this was especially true in China, and Liu speculated that players probably had spent real-world money to obtain Neuvillette, adding to their anger.

Following the backlash, HoYoverse issued an apology, reverted the adjustment, and compensated players accordingly. Christine Choi of Destructoid added that the controversy stemmed from HoYoverse's attempt at fixing what they saw as a "spin-to-win" exploit, which unexpectedly changed players' strategies in how they used Neuvillette. This prompted HoYoverse to issue a post on HoYoLAB indicating they were closely monitoring players' reactions.

In terms of gameplay design, HK01, Screen Rant, TheGamer and Pocket Tactics all consider Neuvillette to be one of the best Hydro damage dealers in the game and estimate that he surpasses Zhongli in terms of strength. Choi also highlighted Neuvillette's strength, likening his powerful Hydro attacks and self-healing abilities to those seen in the Pokémon franchise. Screen Rant writer Bruno Yonezawa commented that Neuvillette is a high-risk, high-reward, powerful damage dealer. Game Rant commentator Elara Leclair compared him to other Hydro users and praised him for bringing a "unique playstyle" to the game. Pro Game Guides commentator Nicki Si praised his gameplay overall and called it fun and interesting. She also complimented his versatility, saying he is "easy to slot into a ton of teams."
