= Joe Zieja =

American voice actor

- Born: Joseph Edward Zieja; January 16, 1985 (age 41); New Jersey, U.S.
- Education: United States Air Force Academy
- Occupations: USAF officer; voice actor; author
- Years active: 2013–present
- Agent: Atlas Talent Agency
- Notable work: Fire Emblem: Three Houses; Transformers: War for Cybertron Trilogy; The VeggieTales Show; Epic Failure Trilogy; Genshin Impact as Wriothesley
- Website: https://www.joezieja.com/

Joseph Edward Zieja (born January 16, 1985) is an American voice actor, author, and former United States Air Force captain.

== Biography ==
=== Early life and military service ===
Zieja grew up in Sparta, New Jersey. He graduated from the United States Air Force Academy. He served as an intelligence officer for over a decade, attaining the rank of captain.

=== Voice acting career ===
Zieja's voice acting career spans video games, animation, and commercials. In 2012, he submitted a fan song called "Not The Taxi You Whistled For", a whistling cover of the song "Farm Boy" from Final Fantasy VII, winning the contest, which helped him get into voice acting.

In 2013, while still in a government role, he began taking on small voiceover projects, and by 2014 had transitioned to full-time voice acting, recording from his home studio before relocating to Los Angeles. According to Zieja, he turned to voice acting after his military intelligence job burned him out, calling that work "a lot of PowerPoints." Within eight months, his client list had grown long enough that he needed to quit his day job and focus on voice acting full-time. He has voiced Fox McCloud in the animated short Star Fox Zero: The Battle Begins (2016), Claude von Riegan in Fire Emblem: Three Houses (2019) and related titles such as Fire Emblem Warriors: Three Hopes (2022) and Fire Emblem Heroes, Bumblebee in the Netflix series Transformers: War for Cybertron Trilogy (2020–2021), Achilles in the English dub of Fate/Apocrypha, and Wriothesley in the video game Genshin Impact (2023). He plays the male version of the protagonist, Wolf, in Destiny: Rising (2025).

Along with voice acting, Zieja's whistling has been dubbed in over 30 different pieces of media since 2025, including Fate/Apocrypha as Achilles idly whistles while waiting for a fight, and in the 2025 film Superman as Clark Kent whistles for his dog.

=== Writing career ===
Zieja is the author of the Epic Failure Trilogy, published by Simon & Schuster's Saga Press. The series includes:

- Mechanical Failure (2016)
- Communication Failure (2017)
- System Failure (2019)

According to Zieja, the novels satirize the bureaucracy of life in the armed forces with a comedic tone. He also narrated the audiobook editions of his works.

== Filmography ==
=== Anime ===
- Hunter × Hunter (2016) – Bloster; Coburn
- JoJo's Bizarre Adventure: Stardust Crusaders (2017) – Oingo
- Mobile Suit Gundam: Iron-Blooded Orphans (2016) – Liza Enza
- Fate/Apocrypha (2017) – Rider of Red / Achilles (speaking and whistling)
- Katsugeki/Touken Ranbu (2018) – Hizamaru
- Cells at Work! (2019) – Bacillus Cereus
- The Disastrous Life of Saiki K.: Reawakened (2019) – Kusuke Saiki
- Ghost in the Shell: SAC_2045 (2020) – Operator
- Digimon Beatbreak (2026) - Myotismon

=== Animation ===
- Star Fox Zero: The Battle Begins (2016) – Fox McCloud
- Lego City Adventures (2019–2022) – Sergeant Duke DeTain
- The VeggieTales Show (2020–2022) – Dr. Flurry, Emperor of Envy, Jesse, Buttons Crimini

=== OVAs ===
- Fate/Grand Carnival (2022) – Achilles

=== Anime films ===
- Hunter × Hunter: Phantom Rouge (2018) – Omokage
- Ni no Kuni (2020) – Castle Guard Thomas
- Suzume (2023) – Tomoya Serizawa
- 100 Meters (2025) – Togashi

=== Video games ===
- Ace Combat 7: Skies Unknown (2019) - Full Band
- Fire Emblem: Three Houses (2019) – Claude von Riegan
- Fire Emblem Heroes (2019) – Claude von Riegan
- Pokémon Masters (2019) – Silver
- Genshin Impact (2020) – Wriothesley
- Yakuza: Like a Dragon (2020) – additional voices
- Tales of Arise (2021) – Vholran Igniseri / Hevrekt-35
- Rune Factory 5 (2022) – Terry
- Fire Emblem Warriors: Three Hopes (2022) – Claude von Riegan
- Fire Emblem Engage (2023) – Claude von Riegan
- Like a Dragon Gaiden: The Man Who Erased His Name (2023) – additional voices
- Starfield (2023) – Denis Averin
- The Legend of Heroes: Trails into Reverie (2023) - Kurt Vander
- Persona 5 Tactica (2023) – Additional voices
- Persona 3 Reload (2024) – Kenji Tomochika
- Sand Land (2024) – General Krowa
- Farmagia (2024) – Lookie-Loo
- Marvel Rivals (2024) – Bruce Banner
- Yakuza 0 Director's Cut (2025) – Additional voices
- Raidou Remastered: The Mystery of the Soulless Army (2025) – General Munakata
- Story of Seasons: Grand Bazaar (2025) – Player D
- Destiny: Rising (2025) – Wolf
- Digimon Story: Time Stranger (2025) – Kosuke Misono
- Hyrule Warriors: Age of Imprisonment (2025) – Raphica
- Date Everything (2025) - Birdtha (whistling), all 100 theme songs for characters.
