= Fontaine (Genshin Impact) =

Fictional nation in Genshin Impact

- Genshin Impact location
- The Court of Fontaine, the capital and largest city
- Created by: miHoYo
- Based on: Europe during the Industrial Revolution, particularly France and the United Kingdom

In-universe information
- Type: Country
- Ruled by: Focalors (formerly de jure); Furina de Fontaine (formerly de facto); Neuvillette (Note: While Furina acts as ruler for the majority of the game's main story, Neuvillette takes control during the end of the Fontaine chapter.)
- Races: Humans; Melusines
- Location: North-central part of Teyvat
- Characters: List
- Element: Hydro
- Ideal: Justice

Fontaine (Chinese: 枫丹; pinyin: Fēngdān) is a fictional nation in the video game Genshin Impact, developed by miHoYo. The region became officially available to players on August 16, 2023, with the release of version 4.0. Fontaine is the fifth of seven nations in the game to be released. It is located north of the deserts of Sumeru and west of Mondstadt. Fontaine serves as the primary setting for Chapter 4 of the game's main storyline.

Fontaine is based on Western European countries during the Industrial Revolution era, particularly France and the United Kingdom. Its design incorporates artistic styles such as baroque and art deco, and its soundtrack features performances using classical European instruments. The underwater environments and gameplay mechanics, which differ from those on land, have received positive reviews from critics, though some character outfits originating from Fontaine have sparked controversy.

== Creation and design ==
=== Scenes and gameplay ===
Information about Fontaine was first disclosed by miHoYo on June 23, 2023. Fontaine is the fifth of seven nations in Genshin Impact's fictional world of Teyvat to be released. It represents the element of Hydro and is the setting of chapter 4 of the game's storyline. It is known for its flourishing science and culture, making it the most technologically advanced region in Teyvat. The name "Fontaine" comes from the French word for "fountain" or "spring". The development team began designing Fontaine in early 2021, drawing inspiration from the natural landscapes and historical cultures of European countries such as France and the United Kingdom during the Industrial Revolution. The design also incorporates steampunk elements. To emphasize the region's technological advancement, the team created a comprehensive system of clockwork mechanisms known as "clockwork meka".

A screenshot of a player, playing as Hu Tao, exploring the underwater area of Fontaine

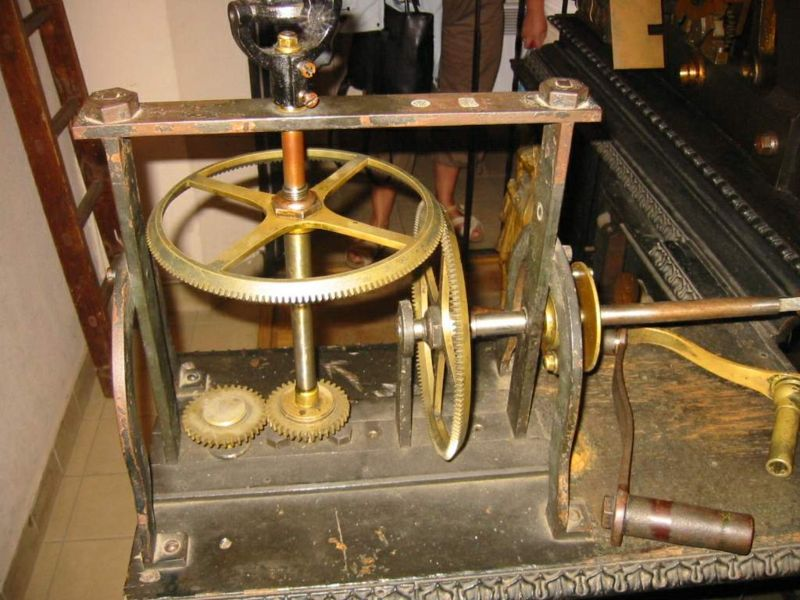
An astronomical clock at the Besançon Cathedral. Clocks and gears like these are abundant in Fontaine as a representation of the region's technology.

In terms of environmental design, to differentiate Fontaine's outdoor scenery from that of other nations such as Sumeru or Inazuma, the team referenced plant depictions in 18th-century European oil paintings, while the design of mountainous terrain was inspired by the Alps. The architecture in Fontaine's urban areas combines baroque and art deco styles, incorporating water, gears, and elements of clockwork alongside darker settings such as underground waterways. Fontaine also features underwater areas that are absent in other regions. The developers adopted new technologies to recreate the underwater ecosystem: fish schools were simulated using group behavior algorithms, while water currents and aquatic plants were implemented using soft-body simulation techniques. The overall design of the underwater environment is bright and transparent, and the team filled it with abundant content to prevent players from experiencing thalassophobia during exploration. Underwater puzzles and various scenic elements were arranged to provide players with a rich experience from every angle while ensuring that the game ran smoothly on players' devices. In addition, underwater camera behavior was adjusted to prevent motion sickness.

The development team introduced new mechanics called "Pneuma" and "Ousia" (jointly known as Fontaine's "Arkhe" system) in Fontaine's puzzles. These two opposing elemental forces cancel each other out when combined. Characters native to Fontaine (as well as the game's protagonist the Traveler) can apply either Pneuma or Ousia attributes through their abilities, and collecting certain items allows non-Fontainian characters to do this as well. Many puzzles in Fontaine require using this system, and some enemies also employ it; attacking them with the opposite force changes their behavior patterns. Since land-based combat and exploration systems could not be directly applied to underwater areas, the developers created an entirely new system. In Fontaine, characters do not have an "oxygen gauge" restricting underwater movement, as it is said in the game's lore that anyone who can control the elements is automatically able to breathe (and speak) underwater without issue. The development team also designed underwater currents to allow for quick travel. Characters can also gain special abilities by absorbing powers from marine creatures called "Xenochromatic Armored Crabs" and other species, which they can then use for underwater combat and puzzle-solving.

=== Music ===
Fontaine's environmental music was performed by the London Symphony Orchestra in collaboration with traditional music artists, complementing Fontaine's overall European aesthetic. When creating the region's soundtrack, Genshin Impact's music team, HOYO-MiX, drew inspiration from a variety of European musical traditions, including styles that emerged in Germany and Austria from the Renaissance through the Romantic era, as well as the works of French composers like Camille Saint-Saëns, Gabriel Fauré, and Maurice Ravel. The orchestration featured classic European instruments such as the lute, mandolin, and viol, while combat themes incorporated the glass harmonica to distinguish Fontaine's music from that of Mondstadt, which has a medieval tone.

According to one of the game's music producers, Fontaine's environments can be divided into two distinct musical settings: one for above-water situations and one for underwater, each with its own style. For above-water areas, the soundtrack mainly uses traditional European instruments, incorporating elements of jazz, waltz and Baroque music to evoke Fontaine's sense of romance. In contrast, the underwater music emphasizes electronic sounds and vocal chants, creating an atmosphere that is light and peaceful, helping to prevent players from feeling claustrophobic during underwater exploration. Fontaine's main theme uses a sonata form to convey narrative structure, with an expanded development section to enhance storytelling, and also employs montage techniques to reinforce its narrative flow.

== Setting ==
=== Geography ===
Fontaine is located in the north-central part of Teyvat, with many rivers and lakes. Its main city is called the Court of Fontaine (in league with the nation's ideal of justice), which has landmarks such as an opera house where trials are held. Fontaine has technological products such as the aforementioned clockwork meka and waterbuses. Culturally, Fontaine has public activities such as trials and magic shows. Fontaine is at a higher elevation level than other areas, and has formed gigantic waterfalls. Fontaine also has a unique natural landscape, including plants such as umbrella pines, cedar trees and sunflowers as well as various species known in-game as "xenochromatic creatures".

A Melusine performing her job as a police officer

Genshin Impact also introduced creatures called Melusines to Fontaine, furry anthropomorphic humanoid creatures who generally help play the roles of police and security guards around the Court of Fontaine. Melusines are seen to get along quite well with humans in Fontaine, although this was not always the case as they had been discriminated against for a time before the game's events. They share the same name as the mythic water sprite on whom they are based.

=== Lore ===
In ancient times, the ruler of Teyvat punished the irreverent natives of Fontaine by unleashing a great flood that destroyed all of Fontaine's civilization. After slaying the Hydro Dragon Sovereign who presided over the Primordial Sea, Celestia created the first Hydro Archon, Egeria, to take control over it. Egeria used the Primordial Sea to help her familiars, known as the Oceanids, assume human form, creating Teyvat's first humans. This act enraged the Heavenly Principles, who then prophesied that one day Fontaine would be submerged by a flood, its people would revert to being Oceanids, and the Hydro Archon would weep, sitting on her throne.

Thousands of years later, the Archon Remus, born in Sumeru, came to Fontaine's high seas and founded the nation of Remuria. Under him, the kingdom conquered vast territories and enjoyed an era of prosperity. One day, a prophet told Remus of the future flood disaster destined to strike Fontaine, urging him to seek counsel from the imprisoned Egeria. From her, Remus obtained the "Dew of Life", which he used to transform his people into a new race with magic stones as their bodies. The prophet then sacrificed her life to create "Phobos", a device that governed the emotions of the people. However, human negative emotions corrupted Phobos, leading to Remuria's downfall.

After Remuria's collapse, Egeria took charge and restored order. Her successor, Focalors, rose to power and also sought to resolve the prophesied disaster. To avoid Celestia's scrutiny, she created a double by separating her divinity from her humanity, Furina, to act in her stead and handle Fontaine's affairs. Meanwhile, Focalors secretly accumulated power, and on the eve of the catastrophe, she entrusted the authority over the element of Hydro to the new Hydro Dragon Sovereign, Neuvillette, so that he could confront the disaster, sacrificing her life in the process and leaving Furina to live as a normal human. Following Focalors' wishes, Neuvillette protected the people of Fontaine during the calamity. Afterward, Furina withdrew from public affairs in Fontaine, leaving the country under Neuvillette's governance.

== Release ==
Fontaine was first released on August 16, 2023. Version 4.1 was released in September of that same year, adding two new areas for players to explore, followed by version 4.2 in November and version 4.6 in April 2024 which also released new areas. On August 10, 2023, at the "Genshin FES" exhibition held in Shanghai, Fontaine's concept art was publicly revealed. On August 19, promotional exhibitions showcasing Fontaine's design were held in Tokyo, New York City, Paris and Taipei.

Generally, in terms of gameplay, players typically arrive in Fontaine by following the Archon Quest storyline. However, because the game features an open-world design, after completing the requisite Archon Quest players can unlock a Teleport Waypoint northeast of Sumeru's Hills of Barsom, allowing immediate access to Fontaine.

== Reception ==
Reviewers generally praised Fontaine's environmental and cultural design. An editor from China's Youxi Putao remarked that Fontaine's environment and cultural design were "sufficiently distinctive". Kacee Fay of Dot Esports praised the clothing design of Fontaine's residents and even its dogs. Dengeki Online's Ruku Kobato commented that Fontaine's underwater scenery was very beautiful, while Mobile Game Matters' reviewer Willow praised the underwater areas for giving players the feeling of an "underwater amusement park". Willow also noted that the region's diverse terrain and vegetation alleviated "visual fatigue".

Fontaine's music also received praise from critics. Grey Pigeon, writing for Youxi Putao, commented that the soundtrack demonstrated miHoYo's increasingly sophisticated musical techniques, describing Fontaine's music as distinctive, diverse, and strongly narrative-driven. Xuan Jing, writing in Wenhui Daily, remarked that the music conveyed the romance and grandeur of France and the United Kingdom.

Fontaine's underwater environments attracted significant critical attention. The underwater exploration experience was well received by Game Look and Polygon, among others. Willow observed that the developers had created a combat system distinct from land-based gameplay for underwater exploration, which "ensured diversity in underwater gameplay and greatly enriched Fontaine's playability." An editor at Youxi Putao praised the underwater experience for its "positive player feedback", noting that it avoided the awkward, non-fluid swimming often found in realistic depictions. Puzzles in Fontaine often rely on the region's unique Arkhe system and underwater mechanics. Game Rant's Anthony Bussing considered Fontaine's puzzles more challenging than in past regions, pointing out that because only Fontaine characters inherently possess Arkhe attributes (and some even grant underwater exploration bonuses) players without Fontaine characters may find these puzzles more difficult to solve.

However, the design of some Fontaine characters' costumes sparked controversy. Male players in mainland China and South Korea criticized the female character designs as overly conservative, while also claiming that the male outfits catered excessively to female players. HK01 reported that on the Chinese forum National Geography of Azeroth, there were large numbers of discussions criticizing Fontaine's characters. Specifically, the comments criticized the black stockings and backless design of the male character Lyney, and the conservative costume of the female character Navia, which did not reveal her cleavage. UDN Game Corner also reported that the Korean version of Lyney's promotional video on YouTube had more dislikes than likes because users on the Korean forum DCinside believed that feminists had influenced character design. Users in DCinside claimed that the female characters' outfits were increasingly conservative while male characters such as Lyney contained designs that appealed to female players, including perceived homoerotic aesthetics.
