= Furina (Genshin Impact) =

Fictional character in a video game

Furina de Fontaine
- Genshin Impact character
- Promotional artwork of Ousia-aligned Furina
- First game: Genshin Impact (2023)
- Voiced by: EN: Amber Lee Connors; ZH: Qian Chen; JA: Inori Minase; KO: Kim Ha-yeong

In-universe information
- Alias: Focalors (Note: /ˈfoʊˌsə.lɔːr/, FOE-sa-lore; Chinese: 芙卡洛斯; pinyin: Fúkǎluòsī) (Note: While Focalors and Furina are established as separate characters later in the game's story, Furina has still sometimes been referred to as Focalors.)
- Weapon: Sword
- Origin: Fontaine
- Element: Hydro

Furina de Fontaine (Note: /ˌfʊˈriːnə/, fu-REE-na; Chinese: 芙宁娜·德·枫丹; pinyin: Fúníngnà dé Fēngdān) is a character from Genshin Impact, a 2020 action role-playing gacha game developed by miHoYo. First introduced in an August 2023 update, she serves as its Hydro Archon—the in-game equivalent of a god—as well as the ruler of the fictional nation of Fontaine and a celebrity for her people. She was added as a playable character in November of that year.

As the game's story progresses, it is revealed that Furina is the leftover humanity of the actual Hydro Archon, Focalors, and that she possesses no powers beyond the curse of immortality, which has left her isolated. By the end of Furina's story, Focalors executes herself, freeing Furina from her curse and allowing her to live her own life. As a playable character, Furina can be used both offensively and defensively in combat, possessing abilities that can either heal other party members or damage opponents at the cost of draining the health of other characters.

To showcase the character's complexity, the game developers designed Furina to embody the "contradictory" aspects of her personality. Likewise, her outfit reflects a diverse aesthetic by drawing inspiration from various cultures. The songs Furina performs in-game were inspired by classic tales and musicals. Critics have written positively about Furina, with particular praise being directed at her mental fortitude. She has been cited as a strong female character whose power lies in her mental prowess rather than physical ability. Her distinctive design, which melds elements from multiple cultures, has also received acclaim. As a playable character, Furina's impact on the game's dynamics has established her as one of the game's strongest units.

== Design and voice acting ==
Concept artwork for some of Furina's earlier designs, where the designs for her hair and dress were different

Created for miHoYo's 2020 action role-playing gacha game Genshin Impact, Furina's conception dates back to the beginning of the game's development. When designing her, the developers wanted to give her an aesthetic that demonstrated the different sides of her personality. To do this, they incorporated "contradictory elements" into her aesthetic, such as her streaked hair and heterochromatic eye colors represents Ousia and Pneuma forms based on her Arkhe outfit modes. The developers created several designs for Furina throughout her development, though they eventually settled on her final look due to "development limitations and plot requirements". In January 2023, concept art of Furina's (then only known as "Focalors") final design leaked online alongside information regarding several other characters from Fontaine.

Furina's outfit pairs a typical morning dress (used to demonstrate her nobility) with shorts (which index her mobility and more playful side). Other elements of her outfit were inspired by French and Christian culture; influences from French culture include the "ruff collar" design of her socks, a design on her hat that resembles the iris flower, and her ribbons. Additional elements of her outfit were inspired by classical stories and musicals, such as a fish-tail shaped decoration on her back that was inspired by "The Little Mermaid". Additionally, "La vaguelette", a song performed by Furina with lyrics entirely in French, incorporates inspirations from musicals itself. The song's composition reflects themes demonstrated throughout Furina's story in Genshin Impact. Furina is voiced by Amber Lee Connors in English, Inori Minase in Japanese, Qian Chen in Chinese, and Kim Ha-yeong in Korean. "La vaguelette" is performed by Cécilia Cara.

== Appearances ==
Furina de Fontaine was added to Genshin Impact in an August 2023 update. She is the ruler of Fontaine, a nation in the fictional continent of Teyvat. Each nation is associated with a specific element, and ruled by individual gods known as "Archons", with Furina acting as the "Hydro" element Archon. Fontaine is associated with the ideal of Justice. Consequently, Furina is also referred to as the "God of Justice". Despite being heavily involved with the nation's inner workings, she is viewed by her people less as a god and more as a celebrity. She often performs at Fontaine's opera house, and has a flamboyant personality.

=== Story ===
During the Fontaine story quest, it is revealed that Furina is actually the human part of the true Hydro Archon, Focalors. Focalors was the successor of the first Hydro Archon, Egeria, who granted humanity to the oceanids of Fontaine, an act the "Heavenly Principles"—a celestial entity that rules over Teyvat—considered sinful. For Egeria's transgression, the Heavenly Principles prophesied that Fontaine would be destroyed by means of a great flood, which would revert the people of Fontaine to their oceanid state. To prevent this prophecy and outsmart the Heavenly Principles, Focalors separated her divinity and humanity around 500 years before the events of the game, leaving Furina as her human half. Furina possesses no divine powers, but has been cursed to remain forever young as long as Focalors is alive. In the centuries since becoming Fontaine's leader, Furina has been forced to isolate herself and oppress her inner thoughts. If she were to give up the role, she would risk bringing the prophecy to pass.

When the player and Neuvillette (Fontaine's Chief Justice and the reincarnation of the Hydro Dragon Sovereign) (Note: The power—or "Authority"—wielded by the Archons was long ago stolen from the elemental dragon "sovereigns", who ruled Teyvat prior to the advent of humanity.) discover Furina to not be an Archon, she is put on trial to force her to reveal her true identity. When she is declared guilty, Focalors appears to Neuvillette and admits that she forced Furina to masquerade as the Hydro Archon for the last five centuries. With Furina pretending to be the Archon, Focalors was then free to secretly accumulate enough divine energy to subvert the prophecy of the Heavenly Principles and return her Authority to its rightful owner, Neuvillette. Just as Fontaine begins to flood, Focalors executes herself, transferring her power to Neuvillette. Neuvillette uses his regained Authority to halt the flood and forgive the people of Fontaine of their "sins"; this prevents their deaths and foils the Heavenly Principles' schemes. With Focalors' death, Furina's curse of immortality is broken and she departs to live her life as a normal human.

=== Gameplay ===
In November 2023, a trailer known as "All The World's a Stage" was released, demonstrating Furina as a playable character while making numerous references to musicals in of itself. Afterwards, Furina was added as a playable character in Genshin Impact with the 4.2 update that same month. She is obtainable through the game's "wish" system as a five-star character. Furina uses a sword as her weapon, with her signature weapon being one called the "Splendor of Tranquil Waters". Multiple characters from Fontaine possess one of two "Arkhe" energy modes: "Ousia" and "Pneuma"; when the two combine, a special elemental reaction occurs. (Note: "Arkhe" is an in-game combat mechanic exclusive to characters from Fontaine, with said characters controlling either "Ousia" or "Pneuma". Furina is the only playable character who controls both.) Furina has control over both modes, and whichever one is active also changes her outfit. In her Ousia form, Furina can summon the "Salon Solitaire", three companions that help attack opponents but drain the health of the other party members. In her Pneuma form, Furina summons the "Singer of Many Waters", a single companion that heals the active party member. Both forms can also grant damage buffs to the entire party dependent on how much the health percentage changes, as well as the ability to walk on water. This makes Furina a character who can be used both offensively and defensively in combat.

== Critical reception ==
Furina's story and character have been praised by critics, with many applauding her mental strength and her sacrifice. Yan Ku of Yahoo News wrote that Furina's suffering was the "heaviest, most loving thing an Archon has ever done for their nation." Ku further argued that Furina deserved a happier ending and expressed hope that miHoYo would provide her character with a more fulfilling conclusion in the future. Ku later wrote that she "wholeheartedly" believed Furina to be the best Archon in the game. GamesRadar+'s Austin Wood echoed these thoughts, directly comparing Furina's character arc to the story of "The Ones Who Walk Away from Omelas", in which a great city prospers at the cost of one child being sentenced to misery. If said child is saved, then the city would crumble. Wood wrote that Furina was Fontaine's equivalent to the nameless child "almost shockingly one-to-one." He stated that Genshin Impact "does gods better than the vast majority of RPGs", and considered Furina's story to be one of the best in video games from 2023.

Siliconera's Jenni Lada echoed similar thoughts to Ku, admiring her strength and mental endurance demonstrated throughout the story. After Furina lost her role as the Hydro Archon, Lada described Furina as a character who was "full of potential". She additionally considered Furina to be the most compelling Archon in the game, and one of the best characters designed by miHoYo. Both Ku and Wood argued that Furina's story surpassed Nahida's, another one of the game's Archons whose story they considered to be among the game's best.

ChuApp editor Xiong Dongdong praised how the development team seamlessly integrated various aspects such as French culture, Christianity, and modern song and dance into her character, while also successfully integrating her into Genshin Impact's world. He highlighted several elements of her design that stood out to him, particularly how her ribbon tied her to an aristocratic image, and how French elements of her outfit, such as the "raff collar" and the iris pattern on her cuffs and hat, demonstrated the amount of research done when creating her. Xiong further praised her lightweight dress and cane sword, and complimented how the character's playful movements highlighted her personality. He added that this, alongside her portrayal in promotional media, helped the character appeal to non-Genshin Impact players, portraying her as a musical star with a cheerful and operatic temperament, and despite being designed from a specifically Chinese perspective, the additional elements of her character helped give her a worldwide appeal. Editor Isaac of Game Grape said that Furina "embodies a high level of artistry", and that she combines charm and "an air of nobility".

Furina has also been described as one of the most influential characters in Genshin Impact's metagame, particularly in her Ousia form; Ku described Furina as "meta-defining". She wrote that, due to Furina's significant combat ability, she made several characters previously viewed as unviable become crucial parts of the player's party when used to take advantage of Furina's full power. Furina has been considered one of the best characters in the game in tier lists from PCGamesN and Eurogamer, while Ku described her as the best character in the game.
