= List of Genshin Impact characters =

Characters in 2020 action role-playing game

Official art from 2024 of all the playable characters that had been released at the time, celebrating the game's 4th anniversary

Genshin Impact is an open-world action role-playing game built around exploration, elemental combat, and a diverse roster of playable characters. Each character is aligned with one of seven elements and wields a Vision, (Note: Most characters wield Visions, except for a few who use their own means of controlling the elements.) a magical device that lets its bearer channel elemental energy in combat. As of November 2026, there are 122 playable characters in the game, with 80 females and 42 male characters (excluding the interchangeable Traveler and Manekin gender options), each offering distinct playstyles, backstories and ties to Teyvat's culture.

Genshin Impact uses a gacha system as its core business model. This means that most of the game's revenue comes from sales on time-limited character "banners" during which players can spend in-game currency for the chance to acquire characters. Through this, some characters such as Zhongli and the Raiden Shogun have earned massive amounts of money for developer HoYoverse. However, some characters faced criticism from players for issues including poor combant performance and cultural appropriation.

== Creation and design ==
Genshin Impact producer Cai Haoyu said that characters are one of the most important components of the game. The characters have unique gameplay based on different elements, which represent the cultural characteristics of their respective regions. The multi-character design of the game is derived from Japanese card games. New characters are continuously introduced; at the same time, contrary to mainstream and past designs that used characters to serve the plot, the production team designed a narrative centered on characters, carrying out multi-plotline parallel narratives under the same worldview. In addition, the characters of Genshin Impact are the main source of profit for the game, with most characters obtained through a wishing mechanic, while other content in the game is provided to players for free.

Each character is designed by a team rather than an individual and there are no "art director" or "creative director" positions in miHoYo. The production team first establishes the character's background story and place of residence, then conducts internal discussions and brainstorming. Afterwards, they evaluate the character's art style, background design, and gameplay mechanics based on player preferences. Once a concept design is finalized, the character design process enters the modeling stage. The production team continuously reviews the character's 3D model to ensure that it is consistent with the concept drawing. In terms of character rendering, the in-game character model and the scene are rendered independently. The scene uses deferred shading, while the characters use forward rendering, allowing the production team to control all lighting effects to ensure that the effect of the character presentation always meets the artist's expectations. To maintain the display effect of the character's face, a system that will automatically adjust according to the direction of the main light source was designed. In terms of the overall shadow effect of the character, the production team depicts the character in a cartoonish art style through cel shading, while also allowing the character to be affected by real-time light sources.

In terms of character artificial intelligence (AI) design, the production team has been developing the game's character AI system since 2017. AI is mainly divided into three categories: humans, wildlife, and non-player characters (NPCs) in combat. There were more than 200 types of AI in the early stages of the game. With the increase in AI brought about by game updates, the production team designed an AI framework and established an independent AI pipeline, breaking the inference modules into different categories according to each function to facilitate subsequent updates and maintenance. The character's behavior is based on a decision tree system to determine the character's skills or movements, and the data will be imported into the animation system for execution. The entire system facilitates giving NPCs different personalities and special abilities, also allowing boss-type characters to have unique actions.

For a character's background, the production team creates their image by building interpersonal relationship networks for the character and refining the regional cultural background of the character's origin. Before the character is officially launched in the game, miHoYo promotes them by releasing relevant videos through its official social media accounts for promotion. Initially, a character teaser in Live2D is released to provide a first impression of their design, identity and personality to players. The day before the character's release, a character trailer (formerly termed "character demo") is released, showing their detailed 3D model, combat animations, skill effects, and some exclusive story and interaction clips. Finally, "Collected Miscellany" videos explain how to use the character's skills and their unique mechanics, with the narrator also describing and commenting on the character's personality based on their respective worldviews.

Many characters are derived from legends of certain nations: for instance, the adepti of Liyue are based on the Xian of Taoism. The idea of the Vision is derived from Taoism: in the game, the concept of a third eye manifests itself in humans in the form of their Vision. Some characters are named after historical or literary figures; for example, Alhaitham is named after the real-life figure Ibn al-Haytham.

== Outlanders ==
Outlanders are characters that are not originally from the world of Teyvat.

- Traveler (旅行者; Lǚxíngzhě)

(Aether) Voiced by: Luyin (Chinese); Zach Aguilar (English); Shun Horie (Japanese); Lee Kyung-tae (Korean)
(Lumine) Voiced by: Yanning (Chinese); Sarah Miller-Crews (English); Aoi Yūki (Japanese); Lee Sae-a (Korean)
The main protagonist of the game. Players can choose either Aether (Note: 空; Kōng) or Lumine (Note: 荧; Yíng) as their Traveler, with the other becoming the non-playable lost sibling, the Prince/ss of the Abyss Order. After being separated from their twin, they embark on a journey to meet the gods of Teyvat and reunite with their lost sibling. Players can name the Traveler at the beginning of the game. The name chosen by the player will be the name used to refer to the Traveler in-game, and only both the Traveler and their Sibling call each other by their real names.

- Aloy (埃洛伊; Āiluòyī)

Voiced by: Li Mufei (Chinese); Giselle Fernandez (English); Ayahi Takagaki (Japanese); Jo Hyeon-jeong (Korean)
The protagonist of Horizon Zero Dawn. She was obtainable to claim as a free gift for limited time as part of a collaboration between miHoYo and Guerrilla Games.

- Skirk (丝柯克; Sīkēkè)

Voiced by: Xie Ying (Chinese); Cat Protano (English); Mamiko Noto (Japanese); Seo Dahye (Korean)
An otherworldly swordswoman who took Tartaglia as an apprentice after he fell into the Abyss. Being the only survivor of her civilization's genocide, she was rescued and trained by Surtalogi and sent to Teyvat to learn about his past. She uses the Seven-Shifting Serpent, an ancient Khaenri'ahn technique he imparted to her, to mimic Cryo while traveling Teyvat.

== Major nations ==
=== Mondstadt ===
Mondstadt was released in September 2020.

- Astrologist Mona Megistus (阿斯托洛吉斯·莫娜·梅姬斯图斯; Āsītuōluòjísī Mònà Méijīsītúsī)

Voiced by: Chen Tingting (Chinese); Felecia Angelle (English); Konomi Kohara (Japanese); Woo Jeong-sin (Korean)
A stern astrologist who often finds herself strapped for money. She is a disciple of Barbeloth, a member of the Hexenzirkel, whom she frequently calls "old hag".

- Bennett (班尼特; Bānnítè)

Voiced by: Mu Xueting (Chinese); Cristina Vee (English); Ryōta Ōsaka (Japanese); Song Ha-rim (Korean)
A Natlan-born member of the Mondstadt branch of the Adventurers' Guild, he is renowned for his exceptionally poor luck, which stems from his disconnection from Natlan's Ley Lines during infancy. However, his luck improves when he is in Natlan.

- Diluc Ragnvindr (迪卢克·莱艮芬德; Dílúkè Láigènfēndé)

Voiced by: Ma Yang (Chinese); Sean Chiplock (English); Kensho Ono (Japanese); Choi Seung-hoon (Korean)
The head of the Ragnvindr Clan which is well known for running the Dawn Winery, Mondstadt's premier winery. A solitary businessman and vintner who was formerly the Cavalry Captain of the Knights of Favonius. Although he and Kaeya are no longer on friendly terms, both of them grew up together as adopted brothers. At night, he secretly operates as a vigilante nicknamed the "Darknight Hero".

- Diona (迪奥娜; Dí'àonà)

Voiced by: Nuoya (Chinese); Dina Sherman (English); Shiori Izawa (Japanese); Woo Jeong-sin (Korean)
A descendant of the Kätzlein bloodline and bartender of the Cat's Tail tavern, who despises alcohol and has a goal to destroy Mondstadt's wine industry. Unbeknownst to her, she was blessed by her childhood friend to always make delicious drinks regardless of the ingredients.

- Durin (杜林; Dùlín)

(Dragon form) Voiced by: Hualing (Chinese); Laura K. Welsh (English); Aya Hisakawa (Japanese); Unknown (Korean)
(Human form) Voiced by: Tao Dian (Chinese); Laurie Kynaston (English); Chiaki Kobayashi (Japanese); Kim Ji-yul (Korean)
A dragon from the fairy-tale world of Simulanka, created by Andersdotter of the Hexenzirkel. He was based on Teyvat's real dragon of the same name, created by Rhinedottir, one of the Five Sinners of Khaenri'ah and a fellow Hexenzirkel member. With Albedo's help, he is transformed into a synthetic human after merging with the original Durin's life force and replacing him as the new Durin.

- Fischl von Luftschloss Narfidort (菲谢尔·冯·露弗施洛斯·那菲多特; Fēixiè'ěr Féng Lùfúshīluòsī Nàfēiduōtè)

(Fischl) Voiced by: Mace (Chinese); Brittany Cox (English); Maaya Uchida (Japanese); Park Go-woon (Korean)
(Oz) Voiced by: Zhao Yuecheng (Chinese); Ben Pronsky (English); Yasunori Masutani (Japanese); Lee Hyun (Korean)
An eccentric investigator from the Adventurers' Guild whose real name is Amy (小艾咪; Xiǎo-àimī). After reading many fantasy books as a child, she started to roleplay as a princess from another world. She speaks in a formal manner, and her night raven companion Ozvaldo "Oz" von Hrafnavins (Note: 奥兹华尔多·赫芙那梵茵斯; Àozīhuá'ěrduō Hèfúnàfànyīnsī) (Note: His name is inconsistent throughout the game. Fischl's lore depicts it as Ozvaldo Hrafnavins while her English voiceovers depicting it as Ozvaldo von Hrafnavins.) often helps interprets her words into plain speech.

- Prune (布伦妮; Bùlúnnī)

Voiced by: Yanning (Chinese); Alice Himora (English); Aoi Nagatsuki (Japanese); Jang Ye-na (Korean)
A self-proclaimed "Witch Hunter" from Nod-Krai who travels to Mondstadt to hunt down Alice, leader of the Hexenzirkel, after she "kidnapped" her imaginary friend Descartes.

- Razor (雷泽; Léizé)

Voiced by: Zhou Shuai (Chinese); Todd Haberkorn (English); Koki Uchiyama (Japanese); Kim Seo-yeong (Korean)
A mysterious boy who was raised by wolves in Wolvendom. He has slowly begun interacting with humans and learning their language, guided by his teacher Lisa Minci.

- Venti (温迪; Wēndí)

Voiced by: Miaojiang (Chinese); Erika Harlacher (English); Ayumu Murase (Japanese); Jung Yu-jung (Korean)
A carefree bard fond of drinking, and the Anemo Archon, Barbatos.

==== Knights of Favonius ====
The Knights of Favonius is the order of knights that protect Mondstadt.

- Albedo (阿贝多; Ābèiduō)

Voiced by: Mace (Chinese); Khoi Dao (English); Kenji Nojima (Japanese); Kim Myung-jun (Korean)
The Chief Alchemist of the Knights of Favonius and the Captain of its Investigation Team. Albedo is not human, but rather a homunculus created by the Khaenri'ahn alchemist and Hexenzirkel member, Rhinedottir. He is regarded as the Kreideprinz (lit. 'Chalk Prince').

- Amber (安柏; Ānbó)

Voiced by: Cai Shujin (Chinese); Kelly Baskin (English); Manaka Iwami (Japanese); Kim Yeon-woo (Korean)
An outgoing, gregarious Knight of Favonius and the only member of its Outrider unit; she is widely regarded as the gliding champion of Mondstadt. She is regarded as the Crimson Knight.

- Eula Lawrence (优菈·劳伦斯; Yōulā Láolúnsī)

Voiced by: Ziyin (Chinese); Suzie Yeung (English); Rina Satō (Japanese); Kim Hyeon-ji (Korean)
A descendant of the Lawrence Clan, whose tyrannical rule of Mondstadt eventually resulted in its overthrow and exile. She currently works for the Knights of Favonius as the Captain of its Reconnaissance Company. She is regarded as the Spindrift Knight.

- Jean Gunnhildr (琴·古恩希尔德; Qín Gǔ'ēnxī'ěrdé)

Voiced by: Lin Su (Chinese); Stephanie Southerland (English); Chiwa Saitō (Japanese); Ahn Young-mi (Korean)
An heir of the Gunnhildr Clan who is the Acting Grand Master during Varka's absence and deputy Master of the Knights of Favonius, and Barbara's older sister. She is regarded as the Dandelion Knight.

- Kaeya Alberich (凯亚·亚尔伯里奇; Kǎiyà Yà'ěrbólǐqí)

Voiced by: Sun Ye (Chinese); Josey Montana McCoy (English); Kohsuke Toriumi (Japanese); Jeong Joo-won (Korean)
The Cavalry Captain of the Knights of Favonius and Diluc's adopted brother. He is a descendant of the Alberich Clan, a famous clan in Khaenri'ah.

- Klee (可莉; Kělì)

Voiced by: Hualing (Chinese); Poonam Basu (English); Misaki Kuno (Japanese); Bang Yeon-ji (Korean)
A cheerful young girl who refers to herself as the Spark Knight and is the daughter of Alice, a powerful sorceress and leader of the Hexenzirkel. Klee's obsession with explosives at a young age and destructive nature, inherited from her mother, has caused her to often be placed in solitary confinement.

- Lisa Minci (丽莎·敏兹; Lìshā Mǐnzī)

Voiced by: Zhong Ke (Chinese); Mara Junot (English); Rie Tanaka (Japanese); Park Go-woon (Korean)
The head librarian of the Knights of Favonius and a former distinguished student of the Sumeru Akademiya.

- Lohen (洛恩; Luò'ēn)

Voiced by: Lin Jingnan (Chinese); Nick Wolfhard (English); Kōhei Amasaki (Japanese); Lee Sang-ho (Korean)
The Vice Captain of the Knights of Favonius' Fifth Company, known for his wild and unconventional tactics as well as an enthusiasm for combat.

- Mika Schmidt (米卡·施密特; Mǐkǎ Shīmìtè)

Voiced by: Deng Youxi (Chinese); Robb Moreira (English); Yūko Sanpei (Japanese); Yoon Eun-seo (Korean)
An anxious cartographer and front-line surveyor for the Knights of Favonius's Reconnaissance Company.

- Noelle (诺艾尔; Nuò'ài'ěr)

Voiced by: Yanning (Chinese); Laura Faye Smith (English); Kanon Takao (Japanese); Lee Bo-hee (Korean)
A maid employed by the Knights of Favonius who dreams of someday joining their ranks.

- Sucrose (砂糖; Shātáng)

Voiced by: Xiaogan (Chinese); Maya Graydon (English); Akane Fujita (Japanese); Kim Ha-yeong (Korean)
A shy alchemist and Albedo's assistant.

- Varka (法尔伽; Fǎ'ěrjiā)

Voiced by: Hao Xianghai (Chinese); Joseph May (English); Tomokazu Sugita (Japanese); Park Sang-hoon (Korean)
The current Grand Master of the Knights of Favonius, who departed on an expedition half a year before the game's events. After dealing with The Doctor (Il Dottore) and Rerir in Nod-Krai alongside the Traveler, he successfully completes the expedition and returns back to Mondstadt. He is regarded as the Knight of Boreas.

==== Church of Favonius ====
The Church of Favonius is the church subordinate to the Knights of Favonius, worshipping Lord Barbatos.

- Barbara Pegg (芭芭拉·佩奇; Bābālā Pèiqí)

Voiced by: Song Yuanyuan (Chinese); Laura Stahl (English); Akari Kitō (Japanese); Yun Ah-yeong (Korean)
The Deaconess of the Church of Favonius, the primary religious entity in Mondstadt. Also a famous idol, she is a member of the Gunnhildr Clan and the younger sister of Jean.

- Dahlia (塔利雅; Tǎlìyǎ)

Voiced by: Feng Xiu (Chinese); Aileen Mythen (English); Kazutomi Yamamoto (Japanese); Seok Seung-hoon (Korean)
A deacon from the Church of Favonius. He serves as the Herald of Barbatos, informing him of any events that happen in Mondstadt.

- Rosaria (罗莎莉亚; Luóshālìyà)

Voiced by: Zhang Anqi (Chinese); Elizabeth Maxwell (English); Ai Kakuma (Japanese); Kim Bo-na (Korean)
A sister of the Church of Favonius who rarely participates in church activities and protects Mondstadt from the shadows.

=== Liyue ===
Liyue was released in September 2020.

- Baizhu (白术; Báizhú)

(Baizhu) Voiced by: Qin Qiege (Chinese); Sean Durrie (English); Kōji Yusa (Japanese); Lee Hosan (Korean)
(Changsheng) Voiced by: Wang Xiaotong (Chinese); Xanthe Huynh (English); Yui Shoji (Japanese); Jang Mi (Korean)
The owner of the Bubu Pharmacy and guardian of the jiangshi Qiqi. He is accompanied by Changsheng, (Note: 长生; Chángshēng) formerly known as Herblord, (Note: 药君; Yào Jūn) an adeptus who is currently in the form of a snake. She is bound by contract to Baizhu and aids him in using his life force to heal patients.

- Beidou (北斗; Běidòu)

Voiced by: Tang Yajing (Chinese); Allegra Clark (English); Ami Koshimizu (Japanese); Jeong Yoo-mi (Korean)
The Captain of the Crux, an armed fleet famous for their daring adventures.

- Chongyun (重云; Chóngyún)

Voiced by: kinsen (Chinese); Beau Bridgland (English); Soma Saito (Japanese); Yang Jeong-hwa (Korean)
A fangshi exorcist who has never actually seen a spirit to exorcise due to his pure-yang spirit diving away evil spirits,.

- Hu Tao (胡桃; Hú Táo)

Voiced by: Tao Dian (Chinese); Brianna Knickerbocker (English); Rie Takahashi (Japanese); Kim Ha-ru (Korean)
The 77th Director of the Wangsheng Funeral Parlor, who is carefree and lively. She never misses an opportunity to sell coffins to people, and enjoys playing pranks on others.

- Lan Yan (蓝砚; Lán Yàn)

Voiced by: Liu Shisi (Chinese); Anna Devlin (English); Shion Wakayama (Japanese); Kim Soon-mi (Korean)
The humble master rattan weaver of the Lan Clan of the Chenyu Vale Artisans Association.

- Mao Xiangling (卯香菱; Mǎo Xiānglíng)

Voiced by: Xiao N (Chinese); Jackie Lastra (English); Ari Ozawa (Japanese); Yun A-yeong (Korean)
The head chef of Wanmin Restaurant. She is accompanied by a small bear named Guoba (锅巴; Guōbā), a former god known as Marchosius (马科修斯; Mǎkēxiūsī).

- Qiqi (七七; Qīqī)

Voiced by: Yanning (Chinese); Christie Cate (English); Yukari Tamura (Japanese); Lee Seul (Korean)
A young girl turned into a jiangshi or zombie by the adepti when she was a casualty of a battle. She works as a herb gatherer for the Bubu Pharmacy.

- Shenhe (申鹤; Shēnhè)

Voiced by: Qin Ziyi (Chinese); Chelsea Kwoka (English); Ayako Kawasumi (Japanese); Lee Hyun-jin (Korean)
A cursed human woman who grew up as a disciple of the adeptus Xianyun and is the aunt of Chongyun.

- Xingqiu (行秋; Xíngqiū)

Voiced by: Tang Yajing (Chinese); Cristina Vee (English); Junko Minagawa (Japanese); Gwak Gyu-mi (Korean)
The second son to the head of the Feiyun Commerce Guild and a practitioner of the Guhua martial arts.

- Xinyan (辛焱; Xīnyàn)

Voiced by: Wang Yaxin (Chinese); Laura Stahl (English); Chiaki Takahashi (Japanese); Kim Chae-ha (Korean)
A popular rock and roll musician. Having faced prejudice growing up, she aims to inspire resistance to such beliefs through her art.

- Yaoyao (瑶瑶; Yáoyáo)

Voiced by: Liu Yinuo (Chinese); Kelsey Jaffer (English); Mai Kadowaki (Japanese); Yu Hye-ji (Korean)
A young disciple of the adepti.

- Yelan (夜兰; Yèlán)

Voiced by: Xu Hui (Chinese); Laura Post (English); Aya Endō (Japanese); Min-a (Korean)
A mysterious woman operating as an intelligence agent for the Liyue Ministry of Civil Affairs.

- Yip Gaming (叶嘉明; Yè Jiāmíng)

Voiced by: Xie Ying (Chinese); Caleb Yen (English); Shohei Komatsu (Japanese); Kim Yoon-ki (Korean)
A guard of the Sword and Strongbox Secure Transport Agency, which escorts goods from Yilong Wharf to Liyue Harbor. He is also the head of a lion dancing troupe known as the Mighty Mythical Beasts.

- Yun Jin (云堇; Yún Jǐn)

Voiced by: He Wenxiao (Chinese); Judy Alice Lee (English); Kotori Koiwai (Japanese); Sa Mun-yeong (Korean); Yang Yang (song vocals)
An elegant opera singer of the Heyu Tea House, and the director and playwright of the Yun-Han Opera Troupe.

==== Adepti ====
The Adepti (仙; Xiān) (singular Adeptus) are a group in Liyue that consists of both illuminated beasts and gods. Most of them are bound by a contract to protect Liyue from demons and evil gods and are led by the Prime of Adepti, Rex Lapis himself.

- Ganyu (甘雨; Gānyǔ)

Voiced by: Lin Su (Chinese); Jennifer Losi & Rachel Lepore (Note: Originally solely voiced by Jennifer Losi. She was replaced by Lepore for unknown reasons. Losi's existing voicelines are retained.) (English); Reina Ueda (Japanese); Kim Sun-hye (Korean)
The half-qilin secretary of the Liyue Qixing. She is currently bound by a contract involving the Geo Archon.

- Xianyun (闲云; Xiányún)

Voiced by: Qin Ziyi (Chinese); Stephanie Panisello (English); Mana Nakatomi (Japanese); Kang Si-hyeon (Korean)
A knowledgeable and chatty sky blue crane Adeptus known as Cloud Retainer. (Note: 留云借风真君; Liúyún Jièfēng Zhēnjūn) She is one of Morax's old allies, as well as Ganyu and Shenhe's mentor.

- Xiao (魈; Xiāo)

Voiced by: kinsen (Chinese); Laila Berzins (English); Yoshitsugu Matsuoka (Japanese); Sim Kyu-hyuk (Korean)
Known as Alatus, (Note: 金鹏; Jīnpéng) he is the sole remaining member of the Yakshas, a specialized group of Adepti tasked with protecting Liyue from evil gods and spirits, at the cost of being infected with karma.

- Yanfei (烟绯; Yānfēi)

Voiced by: Su Ziwu (Chinese); Lizzie Freeman (English); Yumiri Hanamori (Japanese); Cho Kyung-yi (Korean)
A half-xiezhi legal adviser and one of the few adepti not under contract to the Geo Archon.

- Zhongli (钟离; Zhōnglí)

Voiced by: Peng Bo (Chinese); Keith Silverstein (English); Tomoaki Maeno (Japanese); Pyo Yeong-jae (Korean)
A consultant of the Wangsheng Funeral Parlor and the human vessel of the Geo Archon, Morax. He is also the Prime of Adepti known as Rex Lapis. (Note: 岩王帝君; Yánwáng-dìjūn)

- Zibai (兹白; Zībái)

Voiced by: Mace (Chinese); Laura K. Welsh (English); Misato Fukuen (Japanese); Chun Song-e (Korean)
An angel who once served as a "moon envoy". She is commonly referred to as the "white horse Adeptus".

==== Liyue Qixing ====
The Liyue Qixing is a committee made up of seven merchants and business leaders who govern Liyue.

- Keqing (刻晴; Kèqíng)

Voiced by: Xie Ying (Chinese); Rosie Day (English); Eri Kitamura (Japanese); Lee Bo-hee (Korean)
The Yuheng of the Liyue Qixing. Some consider her odd due to her lack of devotion to the Archons.

- Ningguang (凝光; Níngguāng)

Voiced by: Du Mingya (Chinese); Erin Ebers (English); Sayaka Ohara (Japanese); Gwak Gyu-mi (Korean)
The owner of the Jade Chamber and a wealthy businesswoman in charge of maintaining the law on behalf of the Liyue Qixing.

=== Inazuma ===
Inazuma was released in July 2021.

- Chiori (千织; Qiānzhī)

Voiced by: Chen Yang (Chinese); Brittany Lauda (English); Ayana Taketatsu (Japanese); Lee Da-eun (Korean)
An Inazuman fashion designer who runs the Chioriya Boutique in Fontaine.

- Gorou (五郎; Wǔláng)

Voiced by: Yang Xinran (Chinese); Cory Yee (English); Tasuku Hatanaka (Japanese); Lee Sae-byeok (Korean)
The general of the Watatsumi Army, a resistance group fighting to overturn some of Inazuma's policies.

- Kaedehara Kazuha (枫原万叶; Fēngyuán Wànyè)

Voiced by: Banma (Chinese); Mark Whitten (English); Nobunaga Shimazaki (Japanese); Kim Shin-woo (Korean)
A ronin and poet who is a temporary member of Beidou's crew. Despite his remarkable skill with a blade, Kazuha is a gentle soul who wishes to travel without the burdens of his past.

- Kuki Shinobu (久岐忍; Jiǔqí Rěn)

Voiced by: Yang Ning (Chinese); Kira Buckland (English); Kaori Mizuhashi (Japanese); Kim Yool (Korean)
The deputy leader of the Arataki Gang, who takes it upon herself to keep them out of trouble.

- Naganohara Yoimiya (长野原宵宫; Chángyěyuán Xiāogōng)

Voiced by: Jin Na (Chinese); Jenny Yokobori (English); Kana Ueda (Japanese); Bak Sin-hee (Korean)
The lively owner of Naganohara Fireworks, whom the people of Inazuma have nicknamed the "Queen of the Summer Festival".

- Raiden Shogun (雷电将军; Léidiàn Jiāngjūn)

Voiced by: Juhuahua (Chinese); Anne Yatco (English); Miyuki Sawashiro (Japanese); Park Ji-yoon (Korean)
A bionic puppet created by Raiden Ei, (Note: 雷电影; Léidiàn Yǐng) the Electro Archon, to serve as her vessel, and the current shogun of Inazuma.

- Sangonomiya Kokomi (珊瑚宫心海; Shānhúgōng Xīnhǎi)

Voiced by: Guiniang (Chinese); Risa Mei (English); Suzuko Mimori (Japanese); Yeo Yun-mi (Korean)
The supreme leader and Divine Priestess of Watatsumi Island. Being a skilled strategist, she also leads its army.

- Shikanoin Heizou (鹿野院平藏; Lùyěyuàn Píngzàng)

Voiced by: Lin Jing (Chinese); Kieran Regan (English); Yūichi Iguchi (Japanese); Jeong-Ui-jin (Korean)
A detective associated with the Tenryou Commission.

==== Youkai ====
Youkai (妖怪, Youkai) are a class of supernatural creatures in Inazuma.

- Arataki Itto (荒泷一斗; Huānglóng Yīdòu)

Voiced by: Liu Zhaokun (Chinese); Max Mittelman (English); Takanori Nishikawa (Japanese); Song Joon-seok(Korean)
A mischievous oni and leader of the Arataki Gang. His delinquency often places him at odds with the Tenryou Commission and its general, Kujou Sara.

- Kirara (绮良良; Qǐliángliáng)

Voiced by: Sun Yanqi (Chinese); Julia Gu (English); Sayumi Suzushiro (Japanese); Kang Eun-ae (Korean)
A nekomata who works as a courier at Komaniya Express.

- Kujou Sara (九条裟罗; Jiǔtiáo Shāluó)

Voiced by: Yang Menglu (Chinese); Jeannie Tirado (English); Asami Seto (Japanese); Kang Eun-ae (Korean)
A tengu war general and adopted daughter of the Kujou Clan, a clan that serves the Shogun and helps execute her policies.

- Yae Miko (八重神子; Bāzhòng Shénzǐ)

Voiced by: Du Mingya (Chinese); Ratana (English); Ayane Sakura (Japanese); Moon Yoo-jeong (Korean)
A clever kitsune and the owner and head of the Yae Publishing House, the biggest publishing house in all of Teyvat. She is also the head shrine maiden of the Grand Narukami Shrine.

- Yumemizuki Mizuki (梦见月瑞希; Mèngjiànyuè Ruìxī)

Voiced by: Fumeng Ruowei (Chinese); Naomi McDonald (English); Saya Aizawa (Japanese); Kim Seo-hyun (Korean)
A yumekui-baku who is a clinical psychologist with remarkable talent for reading minds, and a major shareholder of Aisa Bathhouse.

==== Yashiro Commission ====
The Yashiro Commission is one of the three highest-ranking government organizations of Inazuma, known as the Tri-Commission. Run by the Kamisato Clan, they are in charge of shrines, rituals, and cultural activities.

- Kamisato Ayaka (神里绫华; Shénlǐ Línghuá)

Voiced by: Xiao N (Chinese); Erica Mendez (English); Saori Hayami (Japanese); Lee Yu-ri (Korean)
The daughter of the Kamisato Clan and Ayato's younger sister.

- Kamisato Ayato (神里绫人; Shénlǐ Língrén)

Voiced by: Zhao Lu (Chinese); Chris Hackney (English); Akira Ishida (Japanese); Jang Min-hyeok (Korean)
The head of the Yashiro Commission and Ayaka's older brother.

- Sayu (早柚; Zǎoyòu)

Voiced by: Sakula (Chinese); LilyPichu (English); Aya Suzaki (Japanese); Lee Ji-hyeon (Korean)
A mujina-costumed ninja who is a member of the Shuumatsuban, an organization the Yashiro Commission secretly runs. She believes that sleeping will make her grow taller.

- Thoma (托马; Tuōmǎ)

Voiced by: Zhang Pei (Chinese); Christian Banas (English); Masakazu Morita (Japanese); Ryu Seung-gon (Korean)
The chief housekeeper and retainer of the Kamisato Clan, who originates from Mondstadt.

=== Sumeru ===
Sumeru was released in August 2022, and introduced the Dendro characters to the game.

- Candace (坎蒂丝; Kǎndìsī)

Voiced by: Zhang Qi (Chinese); Heather Gonzalez (English); Ryoka Yuzuki (Japanese); Jeon Yeongsu (Korean)
The steadfast guardian of Aaru Village.

- Cyno (赛诺; Sàinuò)

Voiced by: Li Qingyang (Chinese); Alejandro Saab (English); Miyu Irino (Japanese); Lee Woo-ri, Jung Eui-jin (Note: Originally solely voiced by Lee Woo-ri. He was replaced by Jung Eui-jin after his death. Lee's existing voicelines are retained.) (Korean)
The intimidating General Mahamatra of the Matra, a group of disciplinary officers who work for the Sumeru Akademiya.

- Dehya (迪希雅; Díxīyǎ)

Voiced by: Chen Yu (Chinese); Amber May (English); Ayaka Fukuhara (Japanese); Kim Hyeon-sim (Korean)
A hired bodyguard and member of the Eremites, a group of mercenaries from Sumeru's deserts.

- Dori Sangemah Bay (多莉·桑歌玛哈巴依; Duōlì Sānggēmǎhābāyī)

Voiced by: Wang Xiaotong (Chinese); Anjali Kunapaneni (English); Tomoko Kaneda (Japanese); Lee Myeong-ho (Korean)
An enterprising and clever merchant who is obsessed with money. She is the owner of the Palace of Alcazarzaray, which was designed by Kaveh.

- Kaveh (卡维; Kǎwéi)

Voiced by: Liu Sanmu (Chinese); Ben Balmaceda (English); Yuma Uchida (Japanese); Lee Jung-min (Korean)
An esteemed architect whose projects have bankrupted him. He is sensitive, empathetic, and idealistic.

- Nilou (妮露; Nīlù)

Voiced by: Zisu Jiuyue (Chinese); Dani Chambers (English); Hisako Kanemoto (Japanese); Chae Rim (Korean)
A gentle and talented dancer, and the star of the Zubayr Theater.

- Sethos (赛索斯; Sàisuǒsī)

Voiced by: Li Lanling (Chinese); Zeno Robinson (English); Shōya Chiba (Japanese); Kim Dong-hyun (Korean)
The leader of the Temple of Silence and a former vessel of Hermanubis.

==== Forest Rangers ====
The Forest Rangers are a group of civil servants who protect the forests of Sumeru. They are responsible for helping travelers in need and preserving the ecosystem of Sumeru's rainforests.

- Collei (柯莱; Kēlái)

Voiced by: Qin Wenjing (Chinese); Christina Costello (English); Ryoko Maekawa (Japanese); Bang Si-woo (Korean)
An Avidya Forest Ranger who was formerly training under Tighnari's mentorship and is a close friend of Amber. She is one of the main characters of the manga, which details her traumatic past.

- Tighnari (提纳里; Tínàlǐ)

Voiced by: Moran (Chinese); Zachary Gordon (English); Sanae Kobayashi (Japanese); Jung Ui-taek (Korean)
A botanical scholar with extensive practical knowledge and the stern, hardworking chief officer of the Avidya Forest Rangers.

==== Sumeru Akademiya ====
The Sumeru Akademiya is the most prestigious institute of learning in all of Teyvat. It is currently divided into Six Darshans, each of which has a specialty and a designated color for their uniform, and each has its own school.

- Alhaitham (艾尔海森; Ài'ěrhǎisēn)

Voiced by: Yang Chaoran (Chinese); Nazeeh Tarsha (English); Yūichirō Umehara (Japanese); Jun Seunghwa (Korean)
The aloof Scribe of the Sumeru Akademiya, who is responsible for documenting their findings. He briefly served as Acting Grand Sage after the previous one, Azar, was exiled.

- Faruzan (珐露珊; Fàlùshān)

Voiced by: Yan Mengmeng (Chinese); Chandni Parekh (English); Yui Horie (Japanese); Kim You-rim (Korean)
A renowned Akademiya professor and member of the Haravatat Darshan who has recently returned to the institution after being trapped in ancient ruins for a century. She is also a former member of the Kshahrewar Darshan.

- Layla (莱依拉; Láiyīlā)

Voiced by: Hou Xiaofei (Chinese); Ashely Biski (English); Miyu Tomita (Japanese); Kang Sae-Bom (Korean)
A theoretical astrology student of Rtawahist Darshan who suffers from chronic sleep deprivation. She has a livelier, more pragmatic alter ego when she falls asleep.

- Nahida (纳西妲; Nàxīdá)

Voiced by: Hualing (Chinese); Kimberley Anne Campbell (English); Yukari Tamura (Japanese); Park Shi-Yoon (Korean)
The current Dendro Archon, who is known as Lesser Lord Kusanali to her citizens, and the founder of Sumeru Akademiya. (Note: Greater Lord Rukkhadevata founded Sumeru Akademiya. After the removal of her existence from Teyvat, her legacy is passed to Nahida.) She is the reincarnation and successor of Greater Lord Rukkhadevata. (Note: After the removal of Rukkhadevata's existence from Teyvat, Nahida is now believed to have always been the original Dendro Archon.)

- Wanderer (流浪者; Liúlàngzhě)

Voiced by: Luyin (Chinese); Patrick Pedraza (English); Tetsuya Kakihara (Japanese); Min Seung-woo (Korean)
The former Sixth Fatui Harbinger known as Scaramouche (斯卡拉姆齐; Sīkǎlāmǔqí) or The Balladeer (散兵; Sǎnbīng). Originally created by Raiden Ei to carry the Electro Gnosis, she abandoned him after deeming him too emotional to be disposed. Following the events of Sumeru's Archon Quests, he attempted and failed to erase himself from the world's memories to re-write the past. He is now a member of the Vahumana Darshan under the name "Hat Guy". The name chosen by the player will be the name used by the Traveler and Paimon.

=== Fontaine ===
Fontaine was released in August 2023.

- Charlotte (夏洛蒂; Xiàluòdì)

Voiced by: Ruan Congqing (Chinese); Maya Aoki Tuttle & Rebecca Wang (Note: Aoki Tuttle withdrew as Charlotte's voice actress in November 2025 and was replaced by Wang. Aoki Tuttle's existing voicelines are retained.) (English); Azumi Waki (Japanese); Shin On-yu (Korean)
An enthusiastic reporter for Fontaine's famous newspaper, The Steambird.

- Chevreuse (夏沃蕾; Xiàwòlěi)

Voiced by: Pan Danni (Chinese); Erica Lindbeck (English); Shino Shimoji (Japanese); Chae Min-ji (Korean)
A musketeer and the hardworking captain of the Special Security and Surveillance Patrol, a special law enforcement branch in Fontaine.

- Clorinde (克洛琳德; Kèluòlíndé)

Voiced by: Zhao Hanyu (Chinese); Crystal Lee (English); Yui Ishikawa (Japanese); Shin Na-ri (Korean)
An undefeated Champion Duelist in Fontaine who once served as Furina's personal bodyguard. A successor of Fontaine's Marechaussee Hunters of old, she is trained in the art of their swordsmanship.

- Emilie (艾梅莉埃; Àiméilì'āi)

Voiced by: Muzi Cheng (Chinese); Amber Aviles (English); Yoko Hikasa (Japanese); Kwon Da-Ye (Korean)
A renowned perfumer whose products are highly sought out by Fontaine's fashionistas. She also works in the background as a forensic cleaner and is a friend of Chevreuse, having helped her solve some difficult cases.

- Escoffier (爱可菲; Àikěfēi)

Voiced by: Cai Haiting (Chinese); Emily Cass (English); Satomi Satō (Japanese); Son Jung-min (Korean)
The strict and talented ex-head chef of Hotel Debord whose precision gastronomy is famed in Fontaine. She is a hot topic in the culinary world due to her merciless critiques of both colleagues and apprentices.

- Furina de Fontaine (芙宁娜·德·枫丹; Fúníngnà dé Fēngdān)

Voiced by: Qian Chen (Chinese); Amber Lee Connors (English); Inori Minase (Japanese); Kim Ha-yeong (Korean)
An actress and celebrity in Fontaine who has a childlike temper, but can also be caring at times. She is the human half of the former Hydro Archon, Focalors.

- Navia Caspar (娜维娅·卡萨帕; Nàwéiyà Kǎsàpà)

Voiced by: Xiaogan (Chinese); Brenna Larsen (English); Aki Toyosaki (Japanese); Jeong Hae-eun (Korean)
The president of the Spina di Rosula, an organization in Fontaine that extends aid and assistance to citizens that the nation's governing body does not cover.

- Neuvillette (那维莱特; Nàwéiláitè)

Voiced by: Sang Yuze (Chinese); Ray Chase (English); Hiroshi Kamiya (Japanese); Kwak Yoon-sang (Korean)
The imposing Chief Justice of the Court of Fontaine. He is also the reincarnation of the Hydro Sovereign, the Dragon of Water, one of the rulers of Teyvat's ancient dragon race.

- Sigewinne (希格雯; Xīgéwén)

Voiced by: Zhao Shuang (Chinese); Sarah Anne Williams (English); Hina Kino (Japanese); Kim Chae-rin (Korean)
The head nurse of the Fortress of Meropide's infirmary and a Melusine.

- Wriothesley (莱欧斯利; Lái'ōusīlì)

Voiced by: Liu Beichen (Chinese); Joe Zieja (English); Daisuke Ono (Japanese); Kwon Chang-wook (Korean)
The Administrator and Warden of the Fortress of Meropide, an autonomous underwater stronghold that serves as Fontaine's de facto prison. He often goes by the title of "Duke", or "Your Grace".

==== House of the Hearth ====
The House of the Hearth is an orphanage run by Arlecchino, the Fourth Fatui Harbinger. Orphans within the house are often raised directly into the Fatui or remain closely affiliated with the organization by way of their relation to Arlecchino.

- Freminet Snezhevich (菲米尼; Fēimǐní)

Voiced by: Jinli (Chinese); Paul Castro Jr. (English); Shun'ichi Toki (Japanese); Lee Joo-seung (Korean)
A shy diver who is well known in Fontaine for his focus and expertise. He is Lyney and Lynette's adoptive younger brother.

- Lynette Snezhevna (琳妮特; Línnītè)

Voiced by: Kekewei (Chinese); Anairis Quiñones (English); Yū Sasahara (Japanese); Lee Myung-hwa (Korean)
An introverted catgirl who is Lyney's sister and assistant during his magic shows.

- Lyney Snezhevich (林尼; Línní)

Voiced by: Jinli (Chinese); Daman Mills, Cat Protano (young) [English]; Hiro Shimono, Kurea Yamaguchi (young) [Japanese]; Park Song-young (Korean)
A famous magician in Fontaine and Lynette's brother. He is outgoing and spirited, in contrast to his siblings.

=== Natlan ===
Natlan was released in August 2024.

- Chasca (恰斯卡; Qiàsīkǎ)

Voiced by: Zhang Ruoyu (Chinese); Lauren Amante (English); Yūko Kaida (Japanese); Su-hyeon (Korean)
A well-known peacekeeper from the Flower-Feather Clan.

- Citlali (茜特菈莉; Xītèlālì)

Voiced by: Liu Zhixiao (Chinese); Skyler Davenport (English); Asami Tano (Japanese); Lee Eun-jo (Korean)
The high priestess of the Masters of the Night-Wind and the adoptive grandmother of Ororon, who lives in seclusion from the tribe. She is called "Granny Itztli" by the Natlanese due to her being afflicted with a long life span.

- Iansan (伊安珊; Yī'ānshān)

Voiced by: Zhen Li (Chinese); Katrina Salisbury (English); Ayaka Ōhashi (Japanese); Lee Jae-hyeon (Korean)
A renowned Natlanese fitness instructor and nutritionist from the Collective of Plenty.

- Ifa (伊法; Yīfǎ)

(Ifa) Voiced by: Lu Shujun (Chinese); Jonny Loquasto (English); Junta Terashima (Japanese); Park Ki-wook (Korean)
(Cacucu) Voiced by: Lu Shujun (Chinese); Dominic Catrambone (English); Shōhei Komatsu (Japanese); Park Ki-wook (Korean)
A renowned Saurian veterinarian from the Flower-Feather Clan who travels with his companion Cacucu (咔库库; Kǎkùkù). Cacucu assists at Ifa's clinic and is capable of understanding and mimicking human speech.

- Kachina (卡齐娜; Kǎqínà)

Voiced by: Jing Chen (Chinese); Kristen McGuire (English); Yurika Kubo (Japanese); Son Seon-young (Korean)
A young and determined girl from the Children of Echoes, known for her tenacity and knowledge of the land.

- Kinich (基尼奇; Jīníqí)

(Kinich) Voiced by: Banma (Chinese); Jacob Takanashi (English); Noriaki Sugiyama (Japanese); Kim Seong-woo (Korean)
(K'uhul Ajaw) Voiced by: Mi Yang (Chinese); Abby Espiritu (English); Junko Takeuchi (Japanese); Park Ri-na (Korean)
A Saurian Hunter from the Scions of the Canopy. He is accompanied by K'uhul Ajaw (库胡勒阿乔; Kùhúlè Āqiáo), a digital creature and formerly one of the Thirteen Sovereign Lords in ancient Natlan.

- Mavuika (玛薇卡; Mǎwēikǎ)

Voiced by: Li Ye (Chinese); Katiana Sarkissian (English); Mikako Komatsu (Japanese); Kim Na-yul (Korean)
The current Pyro Archon. She was a member of the Scions of the Canopy before ascending to the position.

- Mualani (玛拉妮; Mǎlānī)

Voiced by: Wang Xiaotong (Chinese); Cassandra Lee Morris (English); Nao Tōyama (Japanese); Kim Do-hee (Korean)
A knowledgeable and popular guide from the People of the Springs.

- Ororon (欧洛伦; Ōuluòlún)

Voiced by: Liang Dawei (Chinese); Nathan Nokes (English); Takashi Kondō (Japanese); Seo Jung-ik (Korean)
A young man from the Masters of the Night-Wind, with a strong ability to perceive souls and a passion for growing vegetables and aphids.

- Varesa (瓦雷莎; Wǎléishā)

Voiced by: Qiao Su (Chinese); Jane Jackson (English); M·A·O (Japanese); Kim Ye-rim (Korean)
A laid-back orchard owner, warrior and competitive eater from the Collective of Plenty. She is considered by Iansan as her prime student.

- Xilonen (希诺宁; Xīnuòníng)

Voiced by: Mi Yang (Chinese); Elizabeth Dean (English); Fairouz Ai (Japanese); Kim I-an (Korean)
A smith from the Children of Echoes whose skill with the forge is renowned throughout Natlan. She has designed and created multiple custom implements for her friends and also possesses the knowledge and skill required to forge Ancient Names.

=== Snezhnaya ===
Snezhnaya was released in August 2026.

- Alyosha (阿罗夏; Āluóxià)

Voiced by: Wang Fuping (Chinese); Kevin Andrew Rivera (English); Gen Satō (Japanese); Kim Hye-sung (Korean)
A skilled hunter who is often accompanied by his pet dog Tugarin.

- Anastasya Feodorovna Snezhnaya (安娜丝塔夏・费奥多罗夫娜・雪奈茨娜娅; Ānnàsītǎxià Fèi'àoduōluófūnà Xuěnàicínàyà)

Voiced by: Liu Xiaoyu (Chinese); Lara Korba (English); Haruka Tomatsu (Japanese); Oh Eun-soo (Korean)
The current Cryo Archon and the Tsaritsa (Note: Chinese: 冰之女皇; pinyin: Bīng zhī Nǚhuáng; lit. 'Ice Queen') of Snezhnaya. She is currently overseeing Project Stuzha, a massive plan that would allow her to fight the Heavenly Principles.

- Danica Postelnitskaya (达妮卡; Dánīkǎ)

Voiced by: Zhu Jing (Chinese); Natalie Van Sistine (English); Yumi Hara (Japanese); Yoo Bo-ra (Korean)
The third generation Head Maid whose maternal family line have directly served the Tsaritsa and one of her liaisons.

- Mitya (米提亚; Mǐtíyà)

Voiced by: Su Shangqing (Chinese); Brian Ballance (English); Yūsuke Kobayashi (Japanese); Choi U-seong (Korean)
A scientist who works at the Royal Energy Commission. He also has a scarf that moves on its own accord.

- Noy (诺伊; Nuòyī)

Voiced by: San Shi (Chinese); Jonathan David Bullock (English); Shin-ichiro Miki (Japanese); Jeong Seong-hoon (Korean)
A fae noble from the Hyperborean era who currently resides in Protakropolis.

- Odette Spessiva (奥黛塔・苏佩茜娃; Àodàitǎ Sūpèixīwá)

Voiced by: Pan Danni (Chinese); Alexis Tipton (English); Sumire Uesaka (Japanese); Choi Hyeon-ji (Korean)
The prima ballerina of the Korolevskiy Troupe. She is also a member of the Fatui and is the top contender for succeeding La Signora, her mentor, as Harbinger.

- Valeriy (瓦列里; Wǎlièlǐ)

Voiced by: Gan Ziqi (Chinese); Jordan Reynolds (English); Makoto Furukawa (Japanese); Park No-sik (Korean)
A Fatui major who emphasizes the importance of time management and guards the Armory Palace managed by Sandrone.

- Vesna Strivozha (薇斯纳; Wēisīnà)

Voiced by: Gui Niang (Chinese); Ari Thrash (English); Aya Hirano (Japanese); Joo Ye-jin (Korean)
A Vila fae who is the commander of the Druzhna, the personal guards of the Tsaritsa. She is also one of the Tsaritsa's liaisons.

- Vodyanitsa (沃雅妮莎; Wòyǎnīshā)

Voiced by: Su Wan (Chinese); Suzie Yeung (English); Kanae Itō (Japanese); Kim Ye-ryeong (Korean)
A Water Imp fae and the prima donna of the Korolevskiy Troupe.

==== Eleven Fatui Harbingers ====
The Eleven Fatui Harbingers are the powerful lieutenants of Anastasya. They are based on characters from the commedia dell'arte.

- Arlecchino (阿蕾奇诺; Ālěiqínuò)

Voiced by: Huang Ying (Chinese); Erin Yvette (English); Nanako Mori (Japanese); Lee Myung-Hee (Korean)
The Fourth Fatui Harbinger known as The Knave (仆人; Púrén), whose real name is Peruere Snezhevna. (Note: 佩露薇利·雪奈茨芙娜; Pèilùwēilì Xuěnàicífúnà) She is a descendant of the Crimson Moon Dynasty of Khaenri'ah and the director of the House of the Hearth, an orphanage in which she is commonly addressed as "Father" by the orphans. An orphan herself, she killed the previous harbinger with her current title and succeeded her as the new Knave.

- Il Capitano (卡皮塔诺; Kǎpítǎnuò)

Voiced by: Wang Wei (Chinese); Chris Tergliafera (English); Ken Narita (Japanese); Min Eung-sik (Korean)
The First Fatui Harbinger known as The Captain (队长; Duìzhǎng), formerly known as the Sentinel Knight of Khaenri'ah named Thrain. (Note: 瑟雷恩; Sèléi'ēn) Extremely powerful yet enigmatic, he is well-respected within the Fatui and holds a strong sense of righteousness. He sacrificed himself in place of Mavuika after she used Ronova's powers. His soul has merged with the Ley Lines of Natlan.

- Il Dottore (多托雷; Duōtuōléi)

Voiced by: Wu Lei (Chinese); Mick Wingert (English); Toshihiko Seki (Japanese); Park Seong-tae (Korean)
The Second Fatui Harbinger known as The Doctor (博士; Bóshì), formerly a student at Sumeru's Akademiya named Zandik. (Note: 赞迪克; Zàndíkè) Ambitious and obsessed with transcending the boundaries of humanity, he created multiple segments of himself representing different stages of his life. His original body passed away at 85 prior to the game's events; all segments but the Omega Build were destroyed in exchange for the Electro Gnosis, and the Omega Build was destroyed by Columbina. He tries to infect the Ley Lines of Teyvat after his death but is eventually brought to a permanent end by Nahida.

- La Signora (席诺拉; Xínuòlā)

Voiced by: Ziyin (Chinese); Anonymous (English); Yui Shoji (Japanese); Yang Jeong-hwa (Korean)
The Eighth Fatui Harbinger known as The Fair Lady (女士; Nǚshì) whose real name was Rosalyne-Kruzchka Lohefalter. (Note: 罗莎琳·克鲁兹希卡·洛厄法特; Luóshālín-Kèlǔzīxīkǎ Luò'èfǎtè) She was executed by the Raiden Shogun after losing a duel with the Traveler.

- Pantalone (潘塔罗涅; Pāntǎluóniè)

Voiced by: Liang Dawei (Chinese); J. Michael Tatum (English); Takanori Hoshino (Japanese); Seo Yun-seon (Korean)
The Ninth Fatui Harbinger known as Regrator (富人; Fùrén) whose real name is Feofan Sergeyevich Veksel. (Note: 费奥潘・谢尔盖耶维奇・维克塞; Fèiàopān Xièěrgàiyéwéiqí Wéikèsāi) The richest of all the Harbingers, he is in charge of Snezhnaya's economic policies.

- Pierro (皮耶罗; Píyēluó)

Voiced by: Fu Chong (Chinese); Richard Tatum (English); Yasuhiro Mamiya (Japanese); Sim Seung-han (Korean)
The Director of the Fatui known as The Jester (丑角; Chǒujué), whose real name is Eftirvit.(艾弗提尔维特; Àifútí'ěrwéitè) He previously served as a royal mage within the Court of Khaenri'ah prior to the Cataclysm.

- Pulcinella (普契涅拉; Pǔqìnièlā)

Voiced by: Wang Xiaobing (Chinese); Dave B. Mitchell (English); Chō (Japanese); Kang Koo-han (Korean)
The Fifth Fatui Harbinger known as The Rooster (公鸡; Gōngjī), whose real name is Mirko Radovidovich Veleshek. (Note: 米尔科・拉杜维德维奇・维列谢克; Mǐ'ěrkē Lādùwéidéwéiqí Wéilièxièkè) A Domovoy fae, he is the current mayor of Snezhnograd, making him in charge of the political affairs in Snezhnaya. He is also involved in Project Stuzha as its overseer.

- Sandrone (桑多涅; Sāngduōniè)

Voiced by: Hong Haitian (Chinese); Deneen Melody (English); Mariko Honda (Japanese); Gang Eun-ae (Korean)
The Seventh Fatui Harbinger known as Marionette (木偶; Mù'ǒu), whose real name is Marionette Guillotin. (Note: 小玛丽安·吉约丹; Xiǎo Mǎlì'ān Jíyuēdān) She is a puppet created by a genius researcher who modeled her after his deceased younger sister. She was accompanied by Pulonia, (Note: An acronym for "Prospective Undulation Localized Observing and Investigating Automaton") a large clockwork meka. She and Pulonia were both destroyed by Dottore during a fight, but a built-in failsafe saved her long enough to repair herself. She is now accompanied by a new robotic companion named "Fagio" (French: Facilitatrice Automatisée Généraliste Interactive et Omnitâche). (Note: An acronym for "Facilitatrice Automatisee Generaliste Interactive et Omnitache")

- Tartaglia (达达利亚; Dádálìyà)

Voiced by: Yudong (Chinese); Griffin Burns (English); Ryōhei Kimura (Japanese); Nam Doh-hyeong (Korean)
The Eleventh Fatui Harbinger known as Childe (公子; Gōngzǐ), whose real name is Ajax. (Note: 阿贾克斯; Ājiǎkèsī) He was trained by Skirk after he fell into the Abyss as a teenager. Despite being carefree, he is an expert combatant proficient with multiple weapons who is obsessed with battle and enjoys fighting powerful opponents, with his only goal being to become stronger.

==== Nod-Krai ====
Nod-Krai is an autonomous region located at the southwestern part of Snezhnaya. Kuuvahki, a primordial lunar energy predating the seven elements, is abundant in Nod-Krai and harnessed for many purposes, including powering the Vision-like Moon Wheels and their Lunar Elemental Reactions. Nod-Krai was released in September 2025.

- Aino (爱诺; Àinuò)

Voiced by: Ge Zirui (Chinese); Annabel Brook (English); Natsumi Takamori (Japanese); Jo Kyoung-i (Korean)
The creator of Ineffa and founder of the Clink-Clank Krumkake Craftshop, who can piece together all kinds of intricate machines for various functions just from the scrap metal she collects.

- Columbina Hyposelenia (哥伦比娅·希珀塞莱尼娅; Gēlúnbǐyà Xīpòsāiláiníyà)

Voiced by: Yang Menglu (Chinese); Emi Lo (English); Lynn (Japanese); Yu Yeong (Korean)
The former Third Fatui Harbinger known as The Damselette (少女; Shàonǚ) and the Trilune Goddess. She is worshipped as the Moon Maiden Kuutar by the Frostmoon Scions which she left shortly after her birth and joined the Fatui. After fulfilling an unspecified agreement with the Tsaritsa which required much of her strength, she left the Fatui and currently resides in Silvermoon Hall at Hiisi Island.

- Illuga (叶洛亚; Yèluòyà)

Voiced by: Yu Tou (Chinese); Jonathon Ha (English); Shūichirō Umeda (Japanese); Hwang Dong-hyeon (Korean)
A member of the Lightkeepers who is part of the Nightmare Orioles, an investigation squad. The adoptive son of the current leader, he is able to remain optimistic and positive, no matter the situation.

- Ineffa (伊涅芙; Yīnièfú)

Voiced by: Meijia (Chinese); Angelina Danielle Cama (English); Megumi Nakajima (Japanese); Sung Ye-won (Korean)
A multifunctional robot created by Aino containing integrated mechanical components from various nations and assembled in Nod-Krai with her core originating from benevolent core of Eleventh of the Thirteen Sovereign Lords in ancient Natlan. She is accompanied by a smaller robot named Birgitta.

- Jahoda (雅珂达; Yǎkēdá)

Voiced by: Han Jiaojiao (Chinese); Sonya Krueger (English); Konomi Inagaki (Japanese); Oh Ro-ah (Korean)
An employee of the Curatorium of Secrets and self-proclaimed bounty hunter who is constantly afraid of being fired by Nefer, her boss. She was formerly a member of the Seahook Gang which disbanded after the boss was killed.

- Kyryll Chudomirovich Flins (克里洛·楚德米洛维奇·菲林斯; Kèlǐluò Chǔdémǐluòwéiqí Fēilínsī)

Voiced by: Ma Zhengyang (Chinese); Nic Olsen (English); Yuichi Nakamura (Japanese); Shin Yong-woo (Korean)
A Lantern fae and a member of the Lightkeepers who watches over the Final Night Cemetery. He carries a lantern to dispel the Wild Hunt .

- Lauma (菈乌玛; Lāwūmǎ)

Voiced by: Zhang Anqi (Chinese); Alexandra Guelff (English); Houko Kuwashima (Japanese); Jang Chae-yeon (Korean)
The Moonchanter of the Frostmoon Scions. She is incredibly benevolent and kind, becoming highly respected among her people and the wildlife.

- Linnea (莉奈娅; Lìnàiyà)

Voiced by: Zhou Tong (Chinese); Savanna Menzel (English); Haruka Shiraishi (Japanese); Kim Yun-Chae (Korean)
An Augury Bird fae who serves as an advisor for the Adventurers' Guild in Nod-Krai. She possesses extensive knowledge in life sciences and is always accompanied by Lumi, a Jack Frost fae.

- Nefer (奈芙尔; Nàifú'ěr)

Voiced by: Zeng Tong (Chinese); Ashleigh Haddad (English); Nana Mizuki (Japanese); Won Esther (Korean)
The head of the Curatorium of Secrets and the Northern Intelligence Network, who originates from Sumeru. She is incredibly calculating to the point where people speculate that she can predict the future.

=== Khaenri'ah ===
Khaenri'ah is expected to be released in 2027. It is not part of the continent of Teyvat, and not ruled by any of the Seven Archons.

- Dainsleif (戴因斯雷布; Dàiyīnsīléibù)

Voiced by: Sun Ye (Chinese); Yuri Lowenthal (English); Kenjiro Tsuda (Japanese); Choi Han (Korean)
The former knight captain of the Khaenri'ahn Royal Guard. He used to travel with the Traveler's sibling and occasionally meets with the Traveler to share information.

== Other significant characters ==
- Paimon (派蒙; Pàiméng)

Voiced by: Duoduo Poi (Chinese); Corina Boettger & Penelope Rawlins (Note: Originally solely voiced by Boettger. They were replaced by Rawlins due to them withholding their voice to support the 2024–2025 SAG-AFTRA video game strike.) (English); Aoi Koga (Japanese); Kim Ga-ryeong (Korean)
The Traveler's guide and companion, who mostly speaks for them due to them being a silent protagonist. (Note: In recent quests beginning from Song of the Welkin Moon chapter, the Traveler begins to become more talkative.)

=== Four Great Rulers ===
The Four Great Rulers, also known as the Four Shades, are four gods who serve directly under the Heavenly Principles as their emissaries. They were created by the Heavenly Principles following their descent to Teyvat, serving as the personifications and rulers of the laws.

- Asmoday (阿斯莫代; Āsīmòdài)

Voiced by: Tao Dian (Chinese); Christie Cate (English); Kugimiya Rie (Japanese); Unknown (Korean)
The Ruler of Space. She is responsible for separating the Traveler and their sibling at the start of the game. After preventing the twins from leaving Teyvat, she eventually released them separately in different locations. Asmoday later severed her allegiance to the Heavenly Principles and joined forces with the Traveler's sibling, thereby aligning herself with the Abyss Order.

- Naberius (纳贝里士; Nàbèilǐshì)

Voiced by: Di Feifei (Chinese); Ivy Dupler (English); Yuriko Yamaguchi (Japanese); So Yeon (Korean)
The Ruler of Life. She created Egeria, the first Hydro Archon, to serve as the new heart of the Primordial Sea after the first heart was deposited. After the Cataclysm, Naberius's heart was devoured by Rhinedottir, a Sinner and witch, and Naberius fused with her, losing her agency, with Rhinedottir inheriting her powers and duties as the Ruler of Life.

- Ronova (若娜瓦; Ruònàwǎ)

Voiced by: Zhan Jia (Chinese); Aiden Dawn (English); Fumiko Orikasa (Japanese); Park Yi-seo (Korean)
The Ruler of Death. She is responsible for cursing all pure-blooded Khaenri’ahans with immortality and establishing the Ode of Resurrection in Natlan. In Snezhnaya, she also cursed the people of Snezhnaya with a curse of death whenever any individual came up with an idea for technological advancement that would threaten the Heavenly Principles, collaborating with Rhinedottir by using a loophole to "kill" them, then "revive" them before a monitoring cycle concluded. After engaging against the Fatui and the Traveler, she is ultimately defeated, having her authority being confiscated for violating the rules, and killed.

=== Hexenzirkel ===
The Hexenzirkel is a mysterious coven of mages, some of whom possess immense power. They conduct explorations of the world tree that holds all of Teyvat's information, Irminsul, and sometimes host "formal tea parties". Each member has a unique codename corresponding to a letter of the alphabet.

- Alice (艾莉丝; Àilìsī)

Voiced by: Zhang Qi (Chinese); Rachel Kimsey (English); Kikuko Inoue (Japanese); Yeo Min-jeong (Korean)
The Founder and Elder of the Hexenzirkel, creator of Simulanka, and Klee's mother. She is a potent sorceress, adventurer and prolific inventor whose experiments often end destructively.

- Nicole Reeyn (尼可·莱恩; Níkě Lái'ēn)

Voiced by: Yun Hezhui (Chinese); Sophie Shad (English); Megumi Toyoguchi (Japanese); Lee So-eun (Korean)
An angel prophetess who has a passion in sculpting. She is physically mute but has an ability to speak directly into people's minds.

- Rhinedottir (莱茵多特; Láiyīnduōtè)

Voiced by: Di Feifei (Chinese); Ivy Dupler (English); Yuriko Yamaguchi (Japanese); So Yeon (Korean)
A Khaenri'ahn alchemist. Using the Art of Khemia, she created various living beings, including Albedo. After the Cataclysm, she consumed Heart of Naberius, merging with Naberius and taking over her functions as the Ruler of Life.

== Reception ==
Several of the game's characters have enjoyed massive popularity and have earned millions of dollars in revenue. According to PCGamesN, the character banner featuring the Wanderer and Arataki Itto generated over US$3.79 million in revenue on its first day of release and more than US$17.43 million in its first week. In September 2021, during the week of the Raiden Shogun's first banner, the game generated $150 million in revenue, far exceeding that of the whole preceding month. Genshin Impact topped the sales ranking for mobile games in 42 countries and regions. A commentator for HK01 attributed this to her character design, widespread advertising, high player expectations, and the discounts of the game's first anniversary. This record exceeded all previous characters until she made available again in March 2022, which resulted in the game topping iOS revenue charts in over 20 countries and regions. The Raiden Shogun's record was eventually broken by the November 2, 2022 banner, which introduced the Dendro archon Nahida and earned US$34 million in the Chinese market. The record was broken again by a banner featuring Xiao.

== Controversies ==
=== Cultural representation controversies ===
HoYoverse has faced accusations of cultural appropriation and whitewashing for some of their characters, particularly in the regions Sumeru and Natlan. Sumeru, a region inspired by Middle Eastern and South Asian cultures, and Natlan, a region inspired by pre-Columbian Mesoamerican, African, and Polynesian cultures, depict the majority of the characters with white skin. Many of the English voice actors in the game voiced this criticism.

=== Voice actor controversies ===
In February 2023, allegations of abusive behavior and sexual exploitation of minors were made against Elliot Gindi, the English voice actor of Tighnari. Gindi apologized for some of his actions but denied the allegations of preying on minors. He was widely condemned by the Genshin Impact community and fellow voice actors, with the voice director of the game, Chris Faiella, seeking to take action against Gindi. Gindi was later fired and replaced with Zachary Gordon.

==== Conflicts with SAG-AFTRA ====
From 2024 to 2025, HoYoverse was affected by strike action from English voice actors affiliated with SAG-AFTRA as part of SAG-AFTRA's main strike, with game updates frequently having missing voiceovers for certain characters. Although HoYoverse was not listed as one of the companies targeted in the main strike, multiple English voice actors in support of the strike stopped voicing their assigned characters as part of an independent strike separate from the main strike. HoYoverse responded by switching recording studios, as well as recasting various striking voice actors.

Following the main strike's suspension, while some voice actors returned to continue voicing their characters, Sean Chiplock stated that other voice actors are still striking against HoYoverse independently due to the company's non-union status. As a result, HoYoverse continued to recast multiple voice actors even after the main strike ended. In total, five English voice actors were recast due to the strike. (Note: In order of recasting: John Patneaude (formerly Kinich); Corina Boettger (formerly Paimon); Kayli Mills (formerly Keqing); Valeria Rodriguez (formerly Sucrose); Shara Kirby (formerly Candace))
