= Fischl (Genshin Impact) =

Video game character

- Genshin Impact character
- Official artwork
- First game: Genshin Impact (2020)
- Voiced by: English: Brittany Cox (Fischl); Ben Pronsky (Oz); Chinese: Mace (Fischl); Li Yuantao (Oz; 2020–2022); Zhao Yuecheng (Oz; 2022-present); Japanese: Maaya Uchida (Fischl); Yasunori Masutani (Oz); Korean: Park Go-woon (Fischl); Lee Hyeon (Oz)

In-universe information
- Full name: Fischl von Luftschloss Narfidort
- Species: Human (Fischl); Night raven (Oz)
- Title: Prinzessin der Verurteilung
- Weapon: Bow
- Home: Mondstadt
- Element: Electro

Fischl von Luftschloss Narfidort (Chinese: 菲谢尔·冯·露弗施洛斯·那菲多特; pinyin: Fēixiè'ěr Féng Lùfúshīluòsī Nàfēiduōtè), real name Amy (小艾咪; Xiǎo Àimī; 'Little Amy'), is a character in the video game Genshin Impact, developed by miHoYo. In the game, she is an adventurer who calls herself the Prinzessin der Verurteilung (lit. 'Princess of Condemnation') and is accompanied by Oz (Note: Oz's full name has been inconsistent throughout the game. Fischl's lore and the "Immernachtreich Apokalypse" quest say it is "Ozvaldo Hrafnavins", while Fischl's voiceovers in English have it as "Ozvaldo von Hrafnavins". The outfit description for "Ein Immernachtstraum" uses "Osvaldo Hrafnavins".) (奥兹; Àozī), a night raven familiar capable of speech. She is introverted and imaginative, having internalized the persona of a character from stories she enjoys. She is known for her chūnibyō mannerisms and costume design, as well as her eyepatch. Her gameplay was praised for her support utility and damage efficiency.

In the story, Fischl plays a central role in the limited-time events "Unreconciled Stars" and "Summertime Odyssey", the latter of which explores her inner world and personal growth in greater depth and received strong media praise. In July 2021, Fischl was one of the characters chosen to appear in a collaboration event between Genshin Impact and miHoYo's previous game Honkai Impact 3rd. The developers created a shooting mechanic for Fischl for this game which centered on an enemy's weak points.

== Voice acting ==
Fischl is voiced in English by Brittany Cox, in Chinese by Mace, in Japanese by Maaya Uchida, and in Korean by Park Go-woon. Oz is voiced in English by Ben Pronsky, in Japanese by Yasunori Masutani, and in Korean by Lee Hyeon. Oz was originally voiced in Chinese by Li Yuantao. Following controversy over allegations of extramarital infidelity which surfaced in October 2021, beginning with version 2.5 in February 2022, Li was replaced by Zhao Yuecheng. In an interview, Mace said that although Fischl's dialogue is highly chūnibyō, the lines were so long during recording that she had no time to feel embarrassed. Uchida described Fischl as a multi-faceted character whose dialogue was exceptionally difficult: her performance required balancing Fischl's dramatic chūnibyō affectation with the real feelings that occasionally slip through it. She often received direction that indicated that her performance differed from the development team's intended interpretation of chūnibyō, and compared each recording session to receiving a score of 70 percent on a test before striving for a perfect 100%, an experience she found rewarding.

Cox said that Fischl was the character she had played whose voice differed most from her own. Her favorite moments were those in which Fischl "breaks character" and reveals her true identity as Amy. Voicing a malevolent version of Fischl during the version 2.8 event was a dream come true for Cox. Fischl's dialogue is known for being both lengthy and difficult; Cox recalled spending an entire hour during her first session merely learning to pronounce the character's full name and title correctly. She said that Fischl was initially conceived for the audition with a lower, more sincere, and more serious voice, but after being cast, she was asked to make her sound younger and more affected. To enter the mindset of a "tsundere princess" Cox imagined Fischl disdainfully filing her nails. She stressed that it was her acting, not her voice, that impressed the developers, since a voice can be adjusted after recording, unlike an emotional connection. The recording scripts were presented as large Excel spreadsheets, sometimes including Oz's lines as a translation tool, since Cox herself relied on Oz to understand Fischl's speech. Overall, she described Fischl as an eccentric and fun character who takes everything seriously without realizing how funny she can be.

== Appearances ==
=== Story ===
Oz

Fischl is an adventurer with the Adventurers' Guild in Mondstadt who calls herself the Prinzessin der Verurteilung, claiming that she and Oz are from another world. She speaks in an elaborate, theatrical manner that is often so difficult to understand that Oz must translate for her and explain things in layman's terms. Her real name is Amy; she is introverted by highly imaginative, and "Fischl" is actually a character from her favorite story. As a child, Amy spent little time with her parents, who themselves were adventurers. She often visited the library, became absorbed in fantasy worlds from books, and began roleplaying as the character Fischl from the story Flowers for Princess Fischl; her parents initially played along. On her fourteenth birthday, however, they urged her to abandon these fantasies. After an argument, she ran to the library, where she received her Vision (Note: A Vision is a magical device used to manipulate the elements.) and met Oz, an Electro being in the form of a night raven.

In the "Unreconciled Stars" event in version 1.1, Fischl is assigned by the Adventurers' Guild to serve as the protagonist Traveler's assistant in an investigation into a contagious illness which causes the infected to fall asleep. Presenting herself as the Prinzessin der Verurteilung, she makes chūnibyō remarks about her supposed homeland, which she calls the Immernachtreich (lit. 'Kingdom of Eternal Night') and dismisses the astrologist Mona Megistus, angering her; Oz later persuades the latter not to use astrology to investigate Fischl's background for revenge. During the investigation, they encounter Scaramouche, who claims to be a wandering samurai from Inazuma. After Mona divines that Scaramouche is actually a Fatui Harbinger, Fischl and the others urgently retreat. As the illness spreads and people begin to collapse from exhaustion, Fischl is forced to split up from the Traveler to help others. Before leaving, though, she unusually speaks as Amy, thanking the Traveler for sincerely listening to what she had to say.

In the "Summertime Odyssey" event in version 2.8, Fischl encounters fellow adventurer Klee one night, and she tells her about the destruction of the Immernachtreich, which deeply moves Klee. Klee then "gives" Fischl a set of islands named the Golden Apple Archipelago. Fischl asks the guild's receptionist, Katheryne, to pass a message onto the Traveler, then travels to the archipelago with Mona, the Traveler, Paimon, Xinyan, Kaedehara Kazuha, and others to witness the arrival of the Immernachtreich. Once there, the group discovers that the islands can recreate people's inner worlds and generate domains from them. Fischl becomes withdrawn, and Mona is unable to comfort her. She briefly leaves the group on the pretext of handling other commissions and even speaks harshly to Oz, leading the others to suspect that she does not want anyone to see the domain formed from her inner world. They later find a copy of a story called Hymn of the Holy Land and enter the Immernachtreich domain, where they learn of the realm's birth and prosperity, as well as Fischl's past: as a young Amy, she played the Prinzessin der Verurteilung with her parents' support, but later grew up in a world where others no longer understood her. Deep within the domain, Fischl confronts another version of herself, "Fischl of the Immernachtreich," dressed in white. Claiming to be the true Prinzessin der Verurteilung, this double takes Oz and accuses Fischl of hiding from reality. Fischl ultimately rebukes her as someone who excludes others to conceal her own weakness, declaring that the Fischl who possesses imagination and remains committed to dreams beyond this world is the strongest one. Oz explains that he left only to prove that Fischl remains herself even without him. Fischl then overcomes the darkness within her and absorbs the other Fischl back into herself.

=== Gameplay ===
In the game, Fischl is a four-star Electro character who uses a bow. Her Normal Attacks have two forms: a rapid series of low-damage shots and a charged attack infused with Electro. Her Elemental Skill summons Oz to assist in attacking enemies, while her Elemental Burst transforms her into Oz temporarily, allowing her to move quickly and deal Electro damage to nearby enemies.

One of Fischl's talents had a buff effect that could fail to function properly in earlier versions of the game; this issue was fixed in version 1.3. In December 2025, version "Luna III" released the "Witch's Homework" system which upgraded characters' talents; Fischl was one of the first of such characters. After this, triggering the Overloaded reaction could grant her an attack bonus, while triggering the Lunar-Charged reaction could increase her Elemental Mastery.

== Promotion and release ==
miHoYo first announced Fischl and released her character artwork on social media on March 31, 2020. A character teaser was released the following day, showcasing her chūnibyō side. According to the developers, Fischl is a very capable adventurer who can complete exploration in the Mondstadt region in less time than other characters. She is accompanied by a night raven named Oz, who not only assists her in combat but is also one of the few familiars in the game capable of speech. Her clothing design stands out among characters from Mondstadt, and she displays the main traits of a typical chūnibyō character in anime: although her left eye is not injured, she wears an eyepatch and believes it contains immense power that must be contained. In version 2.8, the developers released a new outfit for her, which players could obtain by completing certain quests.

In July 2021, Fischl and Keqing appeared in one of miHoYo's other games, Honkai Impact 3rd, marking the first collaboration between the two games. The event, called "Outworld Traveler", allowed players to add the characters to their teams for its duration. Fischl was also the first character in Honkai Impact 3rd to use a bow in combat. Because the two games used different development environments, their assets could not simply be ported over between them. The developers therefore introduced a new "weak point shooting" mechanic: striking an enemy's weak point within a limited time produces strong attack feedback and triggers a quick-time event in which Fischl teleports beside the enemy for a finishing blow. To support this system, the team rebuilt all monsters at a foundational level and added weak-point detection mechanics. Visually, the developers retained Fischl's head model, while adjusting her body proportions based on those of the Honkai Impact 3rd character Seele Vollerei to better fit the game's high-speed combat style. Fischl's signature coordination with Oz was also maintained; after summoning him with her Ultimate, she enters a rapid-fire shooting state.

== Reception ==
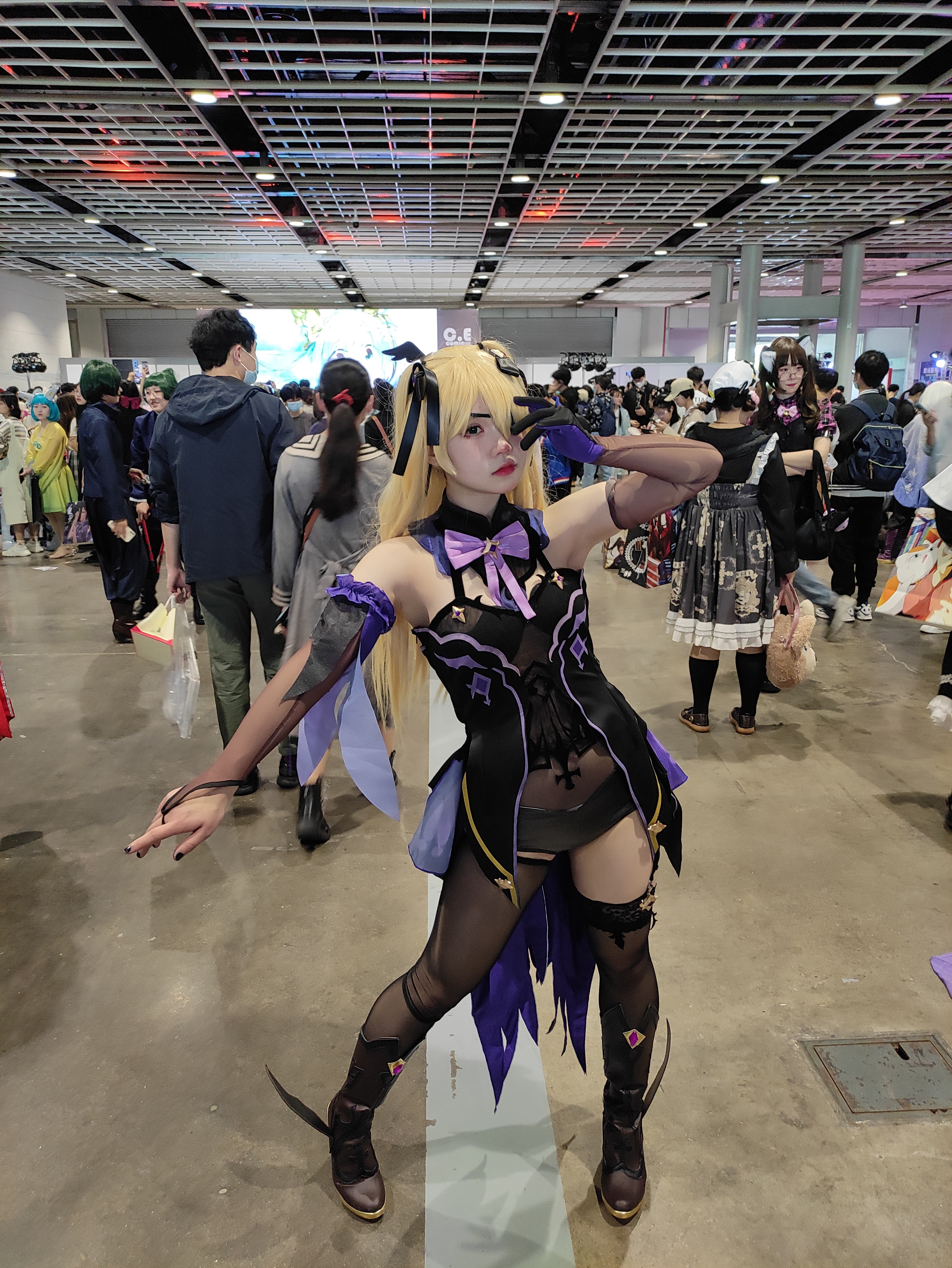
A cosplay of Fischl

Fischl was one of the characters most commonly used by players during the game's early period. Game Rant editor Anthony Puleo, Jr., attributed her popularity not only to her appearance and potential as a powerful offensive support character, but also to her relative accessibility as a four-star character. Players have also expressed appreciation for Fischl via cosplay.

Regarding Fischl's characterization, TheGamer writer Jessica Clark Dillon observed that Fischl's speech can be confusing and difficult to understand, but argued that this distinctive personality has made her one of the game's more popular characters, with many players interested in the story behind her behavior. Siliconera editor Jenni Lada praised Fischl's role in the "Unreconciled Stars" event, calling her dialogue entertaining and also speaking positively about her idle animations and combat gameplay. Yahoo News writer Yan Ku praised Fischl's friendship with Mona, adding that the two remain close after the events of "Unreconciled Stars" and show genuine concern for one another. Ku therefore argued that their friendship goes beyond Fischl's role-playing and reveals how deeply they care about each other. Rice Digital writer Conor Evans called Fischl "[e]veryones' [sic] favourite Jojo poser and electrical archer", noting that her appearance incorporates several popular moe traits, including an eyepatch, twin tails, and messy hair. He also highlighted her Gothic Lolita-inspired style, which in his view, places her among many players' favorite characters. Game Rant writer Sid Natividad criticized Fischl as self-important "elitist snob", arguing that such a personality would be disliked in real life and can be similarly irritating in fiction. He described her as difficult for both players and other in-game characters to deal with, suggested she was lonely and unpopular, and criticized her dialogue as needlessly long-winded.

Fischl's storyline in the "Summertime Odyssey" event received positive media attention. Ku described Fischl's story as bittersweet. Through the domain, players learn that she is really a lonely girl named Amy who found comfort in Flowers for Princess Fischl, gradually began roleplaying as its titular character, and internalized that identity as part of herself. Ku compared the domain's style to the Persona series, writing that Fischl confronts and accepts her inner darkness — her cowardice, fear, and desire for recognition — before affirming that she is unique and loved, and therefore genuinely worthy of the title Prinzessin der Verurteilung. A writer for Game Teahouse praised the sequence's music, writing that Fischl's dream-world exploration was especially memorable. They said that the harpsichord-and-piano arrangements suited Fischl and the castle perfectly, combining elegance with an unmistakable sense of loneliness; the music's chūnibyō grandeur and quiet atmosphere were especially immersive. The writer also noted that one of the game's soundtracks included six tracks for Fischl alone, separated according to mood and trigger conditions, prompting surprise that a single character in one setting could be portrayed through six different pieces of music.

=== Gameplay ===
Polygon writer Patricia Hernandez described Fischl as a "beast" and agreed with player's nickname for her, "Machine Gun Fischl". Jessica Clark Dillon wrote that Fischl's gameplay centers on repeatedly summoning Oz to assist with attacks. Because the effects of her Elemental Skill remain active after switching to another character, many players use her as a primary offensive support.

Youxipai writer Hao Xili noted that Fischl has the same Chinese voice actress, Mace, with the Honkai Impact 3rd characters Fu Hua and the Herrscher of Sentience. This further encouraged players to enjoy "voice actor jokes", such as assembling a team full of characters voiced by Mace to appreciate her work. Such details became a popular talking point among fans of both games. Game Gyro described the shooting system as giving Fischl a distinctive feel in her gameplay, and considered her combat style (combining a bow with Oz as a summoned companion) one of the collaboration's most notable features and among the aspects most worth experiencing.
