= Zibai =

Video game character

- Genshin Impact character
- Official artwork of Zibai
- First game: Genshin Impact (2026)
- Voiced by: EN: Laura Welsh; ZH: Mace; JA: Misato Fukuen; KO: Cheon Song-i

In-universe information
- Species: Horse
- Weapon: Sword
- Origin: Liyue
- Element: Geo

Zibai (Chinese: 兹白; pinyin: Zībái) is a character from the video game Genshin Impact, developed by miHoYo. Zibai was released in version "Luna IV" of the game in early 2026. In the story, she is a divine figure connected to Celestia (a mysterious island floating above Teyvat, from which Teyvat is ruled), the three moon goddesses of Teyvat, and the ancient kingdom of Lang-Gan, where she serves as a guardian of agriculture and the harvest. After defying Celestia in an effort to save Lang-Gan, her soul is shattered into three different incarnations. The game's protagonist, the Traveler, must recover these fragments of her soul before they disappear, allowing Zibai to be reborn whole. Her story arc emphasizes her transition from an aloof divine role toward a more human sense of responsibility and sacrifice.

Zibai's design draws on the mythical creature of the same name described in the Chinese historical text Yi Zhou Shu, combining colorful imagery with horse-like details. Critics praised the depth of the historical and mythological references related to Zibai, while an accompanying poem called "Odes of Lang - Zibai" prompted discussion among players about traditional Chinese culture.

== Design and voice acting ==
Zibai's name comes from a divine beast recorded in the pre-Qin dynasty text Yi Zhou Shu. Described as resembling a white horse with saw-like teeth that fed on tigers and leopards, the creature served as the basis for Zibai's noble and imposing design. The character 兹 (lit. 'this; hereby; herewith') originally refers to luxuriant vegetation, echoing her role as a god of the state who protects her people's farming and harvests. Her identity combines several cultural aspects: she is an angel of the Heavenly Principles, a messenger of the three moon goddesses, and the state deity of the ancient kingdom of Lang-Gan. Her storyline incorporates the Daoist concept of "severing the Three Corpses", dividing her shattered soul into the Upper Corpse God (chaos), the Middle Corpse God (desire) and Lower Corpse God (humanity), forming a narrative transition between divinity and humanity. Visually, Zibai is primarily dressed in white and cyan, with gold accents. The crescent ornaments on her headdress and sleeves suggest her close connection to the game's lunar mythology, while the gold-tipped shoes resemble horse hooves when viewed from the front, retaining traits of white horses. Her Elemental Skill summons a golden spirit horse beneath a ceremonial canopy, while her Elemental Burst releases the horse to gallop under said canopy. Zibai draws her elemental power from a Moon Wheel, rather than a Vision. (Note: A Vision is a magical device used to manipulate the elements.)

=== Voice acting ===
Zibai is voiced by Mace in Chinese, Laura Welsh in English, Misato Fukuen in Japanese, and Cheon Song-i in Korean. In an interview, Mace said her first impression of Zibai was that she was mysterious. Before formally auditioning for the role, she had first encountered Zibai as a player through the in-game book Moonlit Bamboo Grove, which describes her as living in seclusion and protecting ancient stories that even she herself had gradually forgotten. When she received the role during the audition process, Mace thought Zibai was "very beautiful" and kept considering how she could portray that beauty through her performance. After recording, she came to see Zibai as not only mysterious and beautiful, but also composed: someone who seemed like "the kind of good student who had always done well in school." She described the character as refined without being obscure, powerful but restrained in battle, and embodying "the beautiful feeling of an immortal from traditional culture." Fukuen initially found it difficult to grasp Zibai's essence from the first script, but, after reading the full story, understood her as a woman whose soul had fractured after years of repression and pain, yet who remained full of love and a strong sense of justice. The greatest challenge in portraying her was distinguishing among four personalities (the original Zibai and her three separated soul fragments) and recording began only after the production team helped establish the direction of each one. Because Fukuen had seldom portrayed sacred, noble characters, she had to take particular care in balancing Zibai's emotions. She especially liked the scene in which Zibai teaches children to plant crops, finding her clumsy maternal side endearing. Fukuen said she shared Zibai's tendency to speak at length about subjects she enjoys and her strong sense of justice, but could not relate to Zibai's enjoyment of numbers.

Welsh said that Zibai's voice is fairly close to her own, though more serious; because the character has multiple personalities, she made subtle changes to her vocal range for each one. She described developing the voice as a collaborative process that required her to adapt as recording continued. Welsh's first reaction to Zibai's visual design praised the character's beauty; although she personally prefers vivid colors, she admired the character's delicate pastel palette. She also identified with Zibai's inclination to help others and accept responsibility even at the cost of her own well-being. Welsh found place-name pronunciations (particularly "Liyue" within full sentences) the most difficult part of recording, while portraying Zibai's personality came more naturally to her. She was shocked that Zibai could temporarily stop a very powerful Celestial Nail, and by the revelation that the Ruler of Time had divided and preserved Zibai's soul. Welsh also shared that a fan with dissociative identity disorder told her that the character made them feel as if they were seen, which moved her deeply; she praised miHoYo for creating a character with whom such players could identify.

== Appearances ==
Zibai is a divine being created by Phanes, the ruler of the heavens in the mythology of Genshin Impact. Sent to guide the ancient kingdom of Lang-Gan, she teaches its people practical skills like farming, weaving, and making clothes, and they come to worship her as a guardian deity of their land and harvests. Istaroth, the Ruler of Time, later granted Zibai a Moon Wheel, a device which can be used to control the elements, and made her an envoy of the three moon goddesses. Zibai also studied a practice known as "serving the Three Corpses" under Zhongli, a technique intended to discard impure thoughts and recover one's true self, but could not perform it because she lacked such thoughts. When a war spreads corruption across Teyvat, Phanes decides to destroy the affected land with a massive divine weapon called a Celestial Nail, even though doing so will wipe out Lang-Gan. Zibai rebels against this, slowing the weapon long enough to lead survivors out of its path, but is unable to prevent the kingdom's destruction. The grief and anger she feels finally allow her to master the technique, allowing her at last to sever the Three Corpses. As punishment for defying the heavens, however, her soul is shattered into fragments. Istaroth preserves the soul fragments before they disappear, leaving three separate incarnations of Zibai hidden in three places: one in a false moon, one beneath the Chasm in Liyue, and one inside an ancient painting. Long afterward, still centuries prior to the events of the game, Zhongli frees the incarnation imprisoned in the painting, named Ziqiao. She helps him defend parts of what would later become Liyue and restore the region's natural cycle of life and death. Still affected by Istaroth's curse, she eventually withdraws to the mountains near the village, where legends say she still occasionally appears to help those in danger.

In the present, the Traveler is invited by Zhongli to an antiques exhibition and learns that Zibai has died. Zhongli explains that she can be restored if the three surviving fragments of her soul are found before the False Moon, where one of them is imprisoned, collapses. The Traveler first finds Zizhi, the middle soul fragment, who has been possessing several people, including Gaming. After the Traveler earns her trust, Zizhi entrusts herself to them. The Traveler then accompanies Ziqiao, the lower fragment, on a visit through modern-day Liyue during a festival known as Lantern Rite. When all three fragments are reunited, Zibai is reborn. Her memories and personality are unstable after her return, so Zhongli has her rest at an inn before encouraging her to spend time in Liyue and reacquaint herself with ordinary life. While buying tea at Yilong Wharf, she startles a merchant by using mathematics to work out a "zero-percent discount", in other words, tea which costs nothing. She later helps a woman named Lu Xiangxiang, who has been confined by her family, make a wish to the White Horse Adeptus (which is actually Zibai herself) so she can pursue archaeology. She teaches children about crop rotation and farming and also shares a meal with Xiao before parting.

=== Gameplay ===
Zibai is a five-star Geo sword user whose combat kit centers on the "Lunar-Crystallize" reaction, which involves the interaction between Geo and Hydro. When those two elements meet under particular conditions, the reaction creates three Moon Cages near enemies; after three such reactions, they trigger an effect which deals area-of-effect Geo damage. Using her Elemental Skill puts Zibai into the Lunar Phase Shift mode, converting her normal and charged attacks into Geo damage that cannot be overridden by other elemental effects. These attacks build Phase Shift Radiance, which she can spend to use a special version of her skill to deal damage. Her Elemental Burst causes her to unleash the Jadelight Canopy, dealing two instances of area-of-effect Geo damage, the second of which is considered Lunar-Crystallize damage.

== Promotion ==
To accompany Zibai's debut, miHoYo created a poem called "Odes of Lang - Zibai", modeled on one of the poems from the Book of Songs. Its four-character classical verse and uncommon vocabulary, including lines such as "Under moon eternal, in radiant night, a maiden grants silk soft and light" (Chinese: 月出恒兮，有女琚兮; pinyin: Yuè chū héng xī, yǒu nǚ jū xī), create an archaic atmosphere. In the game, the character Ziqiao provides a plain-language translation to help players understand the poem's meaning. Zibai's story had reportedly been foreshadowed in Genshin Impact's text dating back to the game's early release period. A representative of the development team indicated that Zibai's appearance during the Lantern Rite event was intended to coincide with the real-world Year of the Horse, and that the event's story would remain permanently available for players who join later. miHoYo released Zibai's character artwork and introduction on December 11, 2025, followed by a character trailer on January 28, 2026. A gameplay demonstration was released on February 2. She became playable on February 3, alongside her signature weapon.

During the 2026 Lunar New Year period, Genshin Impact partnered with the Shanghai South and Shanghai Hongqiao railway stations to install Lantern Rite-themed photo spots and displays. Light boxes, columns, and themed wall art were used to create a festive atmosphere throughout the stations. A physical version of the game's horse-shaped lantern stood inside the stations, while large posters of Zibai carried blessings for travelers.

== Reception ==
Zibai's banner launched on February 3, 2026, and helped Genshin Impact reach the top three of the mainland Chinese App Store's highest-grossing chart soon afterward. Writing in Jiefang Daily, Shi Chenlu spoke of Zibai's line "As a guardian deity of the soil and grain, it is only fitting that I die for the soil and grain" (Chinese: 忝为社稷神，自当死社稷; pinyin: Tiǎn wèi shèjì shén, zì dāng sǐ shèjì) (Note: "Then, as their god, I shall die among them" in the English localization.) as encapsulating her self-sacrifice and themes of love for family and country and protection of others. Commentators praised the amount of cultural research behind Zibai's characterization. GameLook described the design as exceptionally rigorous: it draws her mythical-beast inspiration from the Yi Zhou Shu, uses the Daoist concept of serving the Three Corpses as the basis of her death-and-rebirth storyline, and frames her development as a movement from divinity toward humanity. The outlet also argued that her role as a guardian of the state and her defining line express traditional Chinese values of kindness, unity and protection. Qian Hongyan of Jinghe wrote that Zibai offers global players an accessible and appealing way to learn about and appreciate Chinese culture, adding that the character's early foreshadowing suggested long-term planning and patience by the development team. Hao Shen of the Macao Daily News found her story deeply moving and praised the game's storytelling.

Regarding the character's visual design, Qian wrote that the gold accents on her shoes resemble horse hooves when viewed from the front, preserving the white-horse imagery of the mythological creature that inspired Zibai. Qian also described the visuals of Zibai's Elemental Burst as steeped in Eastern mythological imagery, creating the impression of "traveling through the long river of history." Overseas players likewise compared the animation to a zuomadeng, a rotating lantern associated with the passage of time, with one player saying they appreciated that kind of detail. Russian outlet Igromania reported that viewers responded especially positively to the visual style of Zibai's character trailer, comparing it to traditional Chinese painting and particularly praising its nighttime scenes. Yekaterina Kuleshova wrote that players described both Zibai and her gameplay showcase as "very beautiful"; some said the presentation was emotionally effective enough to "tear at fans' hearts", while generally praising her design and story background. Her promotional artwork also prompted brief accusations of AI-generated imagery after compression artifacts on some platforms made one of her hands appear to have six fingers. According to Gamersky, players and media later determined that the apparent extra finger was actually a fingernail gap distorted by image compression; the original official artwork did not have the issue.

"Odes of Lang - Zibai" prompted extensive discussion among communities both in and out of China. In Chinese-language communities, its uncommon characters led players to annotate the poem with pinyin, research the meanings and allusions behind its language, and share vernacular translations. Shi Chenlu of the Shanghai Observer reported that players jokingly described this as "studying Chinese with Paimon", referring to the game's mascot, with many posting their annotated translations online. Wenhui Daily journalist Xuan Pin argued that the poem turned young players from passive recipients of culture into active interpreters and communicators: by adding pronunciations and debating translation choices, they took part in adapting traditional Chinese culture for the digital age. Wu Xuying of the Xinmin Evening News likewise praised the game's plain-language rendering as accessible without losing its beauty; online commenters described it as balancing elegance with popular appeal. Translating an archaic, four-character poem modeled after the Book of Songs into Genshin Impact's fifteen supported languages posed a significant challenge for the localization and translation teams. Wu reported that players debated whether Latin or Old English might better reproduce the original's ancient atmosphere; the English translation ultimately used concise, balanced phrasing, with some passages drawing on Old English rhythm, and players regarded it as an especially successful translation. Xuan described each Liyue storyline as a demanding test for translation teams, but concluded that the developers met the challenge. Overseas players also took an interest in Chinese classical poetry through the work, researching its meaning and background and sharing their interpretations online. Some connected the poem to Zibai's story, interpreting it as the people of Lang-Gan's praise for their immortal guardian and hopes for a better life, which strengthened their response to her sacrifice and devotion to her homeland.
