= Kazuha =

Kazuha (written: 一葉, 円葉 or 和葉) is a feminine Japanese given name.

== People with this name ==
- Kazuha Oda (小田 一葉), Japanese singer-songwriter
- Nakamura Kazuha, Japanese singer, member of South Korean girl group Le Sserafim

== Fictional characters ==
- Kaedehara Kazuha, a male character in 2020 video game Genshin Impact
- Kazuha Toyama (遠山 和葉), supporting character in Detective Conan
- Kazuha Aoi, a character in Freezing
- Kazuha Migiwa, a character in Yosuga no Sora
- Kazuha, a male character in Noragami
