= Gaming (Genshin Impact) =

- Genshin Impact character
- Official artwork of Gaming
- First game: Genshin Impact (2024)
- Voiced by: EN: Caleb Yen; ZH: Xie Ying; JA: Shohei Komatsu; KO: Kim Yoon-gi

In-universe information
- Full name: Yip Gaming
- Weapon: Claymore
- Origin: Liyue
- Element: Pyro

Yip Gaming (/ˈɡɑːmɪŋ/ GAH-ming; Chinese: 叶嘉明; pinyin: Yè Jiāmíng; Jyutping: Jip6 Gaa1ming4) is a character in the video game Genshin Impact, developed by miHoYo. He first appeared in version 4.4 of the game in January 2024. In the game, he is an escort for the Sword and Strongbox Secure Transport Agency in Liyue, and is also the leader of a professional dancing troupe. He is described as warm, talkative, and good at interacting with people. Gaming was designed around the concept of a lion dance, and his appearance, movements, and backstory incorporate elements of Cantonese culture. His English name has sparked discussion and fan art among players in the West, promoting the dissemination of Chinese lion dance culture.

== Design and voice acting ==
In November 2022, the Genshin Impact project team designed the character based on the lion dance, which is a symbol of joy and good fortune in traditional Chinese culture, to match the atmosphere of the annual Lantern Rite event for 2024. The team conducted in-depth research on the techniques and customs of lion dancing and incorporated them into the game's world under the name "Wushou dancing".

In terms of visual design, the "beast head" image held by Gaming underwent more than twenty different iterations. The production team once considered making a dragon-shaped beast head to fit the atmosphere of the Year of the Dragon but ultimately abandoned this concept in favor of a lion-esque style. The team invited professional lion dance team members to perform motion capture for the character, and drew inspiration from movements such as jumping, squatting and rolling. The plum blossom pole jumping design used in Gaming's normal attacks went through more than twenty revisions. Meanwhile, the character's companion Man Chai was created through special effects.

Gaming's character draws from the Cantonese culture of southern China. His English name adopts the Cantonese phonetic translation from the original Chinese, rather than the pinyin adopted by most other Liyue characters. His constellation, "Leo Expergiscens", directly references the traditional Cantonese lion dance, and his character description includes various Cantonese expressions. His lifestyle habits include enjoying morning dim sum.

=== Voice acting ===
Gaming is voiced in English by Caleb Yen, in Chinese by Xie Ying, in Japanese by Shohei Komatsu, and in Korean by Kim Yoon-gi. In an interview, Komatsu revealed that he fell in love with the character of Gaming at first sight. Upon seeing the character materials, he strongly felt that a desire to play Gaming. The background story involving his relationship with his father, as well as his experience being active on stage, resonated deeply with him. During recording, Komatsu's main challenge was portraying Gaming's sunny and cheerful personality. Komatsu admitted that he has a somewhat "melancholic" side to his own personality. To get closer to the character, he had to completely eliminate that sense of melancholy. Gaming's unique way of speaking and the many uncommon pronunciations also presented a challenge. Rather than simply substituting vocabulary, he considered the character's state of mind, naturally internalizing and presenting the character's speech patterns. Komatsu also revealed that, like Gaming, he had experienced tension in his relationship with his father, which allowed him to deeply understand Gaming's emotional journey in the story. He believes that it is precisely because there is still a bond deep within their hearts that Gaming can ultimately pursue his dreams.

Meanwhile, Kim Yoon-gi said that when he first received the audition script, he realized that the Lantern Rite was a significant event in Genshin Impact, and that Gaming appeared in a role almost equivalent to that of a main character. This gave him a considerable sense of responsibility, leading him to undertake more than ten days of intensive recording preparation. During the early recording sessions, because of Gaming's passionate and cheerful personality, Kim performed with extremely high energy. However, the voice director gave feedback that, considering Gaming's backstory involving family, he should temper the overly fiery tone in certain sad scenes and reveal more emotional depth. Kim later joked that this excessive enthusiasm during the process might actually have mirrored Gaming's own drive—working as a guard while diligently practicing the Wushou Dance. As for Gaming's charm as a character, Kim believes the most outstanding trait is his "affability." Whether it's with the main characters or everyone he encounters during his escort duties, Gaming proactively greets them and offers to treat them to tea. This warm, naturally outgoing quality is what Kim finds most appealing about him.

== Appearances ==
Gaming grew up in Qiaoying Village, a northern town in Liyue, from a young age. As a child, he once accompanied his father, Ye De, to watch a lion dance performance. He became so deeply fascinated by this and began to practice obsessively, so much so that he broke bamboo baskets at home and used a rice ladle to practice drumming, all in an effort to imitate the dance's movements. However, his father, who ran a tea business, hoped Gaming would inherit the family trade and grew increasingly worried about his son's fixation on dancing. After Gaming's mother died, the relationship between father and son became more distant. Once, after Gaming was hurt during rehearsal, his father flew into a fit of rage and gave away all of Gaming's dance equipment. In response, Gaming left home, taking with him the beast head that his mother had personally made for him. Eventually he arrived at Yilong Wharf, a bustling port filled with travelers. Initially planning to make a living through Wushou dancing, he ran out of startup funds and, to support himself, joined the Sword and Strongbox Secure Transport Agency as a guard.

In the version 4.4 Lantern Rite storyline, Gaming meets the protagonist Traveler and Paimon, and opens up about the rift between him and his father. With the help of Xianyun, one of Liyue's adepti, he accepts an escort commission from his father and returns to Qiaoying Village, where their reunion is initially awkward. Later, with guidance from Zhongli and encouragement from others, their relationship starts to improve gradually. On the night of that year's Lantern Rite, Gaming delivers a Wushou dance performance at Liyue Harbor. His father acknowledges Gaming's dream and the two reconcile in an embrace beneath the fireworks.

=== Gameplay ===
Gaming was released in version 4.4 of the game on January 31, 2024. He is a four-star Pyro (fire) character who uses a two-handed sword. His Normal Attack performs a set amount of strikes. His Elemental Skill causes him to pounce forward using Wushou dancing, leaping into the air. If the player immediately uses a plunging attack after activating the skill, Gaming will perform a more powerful Pyro plunging attack instead and consume some of his hit points. His Elemental Burst causes him to enter into a Wushou stance and recover some hit points. He will then summon Man Chai, his dog companion, who deals Pyro damage to targets.

== Promotion ==
A character demo video for Gaming was released on January 29, 2024, and a behind-the-scenes video showing Gaming's creation was released by miHoYo on February 10, which was the first day of Chinese New Year of that year. miHoYo spent a year collecting information and brainstorming ideas for Gaming's design, and he was not officially released until version 4.4.

== Reception ==
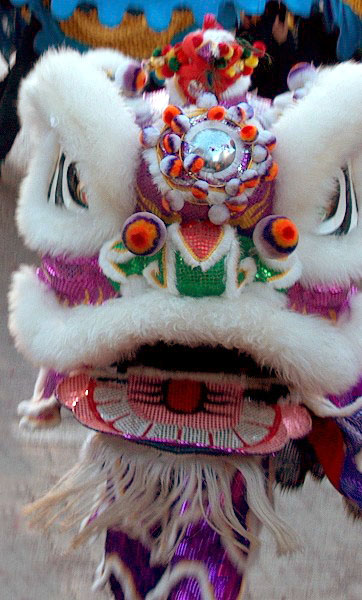
A lion dance costume

After the behind-the-scenes video was released, American animator John Pomeroy, who worked on Tom and Jerry, praised the miHoYo team for their passion and dedication to character design. During the 2025 Guangdong Intangible Cultural Heritage Week and Foshan Qiuse Festival, a student named Qing Heng portrayed Gaming in a parade formation. Holding a lion dance head, he drew on past experience to recreate Gaming's spirit. Qing Heng said he hoped that through cosplay, he could share both Gaming's passion for pursuing his dreams and the cultural heritage of Foshan lion dance with the public.

Gaming's character design has received positive feedback from players across different regions. Some Japanese players appreciated that his design does not wear shorts, and players from other regions felt a sense of familiarity due to his English name being based on Cantonese romanization. In Taiwan, some netizens associated his name with a meme from the TV drama Wives/The Other Hands, making wordplay comments that sparked discussion online.

Because Gaming's romanized name is spelled identically to the present participle of the verb "to game" in English, it has inspired a wave of humorous fan creations in communities outside of China. Some streamers have even tried to learn the correct pronunciation live on-stream, expressing delight upon getting the answer right and showing how his name has become a small medium for cultural education. However, Ben Brosofsky of Screen Rant argued that the name inevitably creates search confusion. When looking up information on Gaming online, users may encounter results about gaming PCs or equipment instead of the character. He humorously suggested that players should add the game's name into the search query to filter out irrelevant search results. Austin Wood wrote that he expected Gaming's name to cause people to search for terms such as "how to build Gaming" and "Gaming release time", which he found funny. Since Gaming's Korean name (가명; gamyeong; kamyŏng) also means "alias" in Korean, many players in Korea joked that his name is actually an alias for something else.

A study published in the International Journal of Computer Law and Political Science argued that Gaming's storyline with his father resonated strongly with players worldwide, particularly those of Asian descent. Many players felt the story authentically portrayed themes of generational relationships and family expectations, while effectively incorporating traditional elements like lion dancing to deepen emotional impact. The study also said that Gaming's style of dancing blends martial arts techniques with rhythmic movement, and that his flips and spinning kicks reflect the fluidity and discipline of Chinese martial arts. His red-and-gold costume symbolizes luck, prosperity, and burning determination. The study concluded that Gaming's design successfully introduces traditional Chinese values and artistic forms to an international audience.
