= Xiao (Genshin Impact) =

Fictional character in a video game

- Genshin Impact character
- Official artwork of Xiao
- First game: Genshin Impact (2020)
- Voiced by: EN: Laila Berzins; ZH: kinsen; JA: Yoshitsugu Matsuoka; KO: Jung Yu-mi (2020); Shim Gyu-hyuk (2020–present)

In-universe information
- Aliases: General Alatus; Conqueror of Demons; The Vigilant Yaksha
- Species: Yaksha
- Weapon: Polearm
- Element: Anemo

Xiao (/ʃaʊ/; Chinese: 魈; pinyin: Xiāo) is a character from the video game Genshin Impact, developed by miHoYo. He first appeared in the Liyue chapter of the main story following the game's launch, and became playable in 2021. In the game, he is a divine being known as an adeptus, and the last surviving yaksha. Xiao's backstory draws inspiration from the Taoist guardian deity Marshal Tianpeng found in novels from the Ming and Qing dynasties, while the mask he wears references traditional Nuo dance masks. His characterization and portrayal have been praised by commentators, although his English voice acting attracted criticism.

== Design and voice acting ==
Xiao was the first adeptus character from Liyue to be released, yet he differs from much of the other adepti in that he frequently appears in human form while they generally do not, with a few exceptions. For this reason, the team decided to give Xiao a Vision. (Note: In the game, a Vision is an external magical focus that allows the wielder to control one of the seven elements: air (Anemo), stone (Geo), electricity (Electro), plant (Dendro), water, (Hydro), fire (Pyro) or ice (Cryo).) His name and backstory draw inspiration from the guardian deity Huaguang Dadi found in shenmo literature from the Ming and Qing dynasties, as well as from the Wutong Shen. Xiao's gameplay design references the Buddhist image of yaksha. His character concept is also informed by narrative archetypes found in traditional Chinese literature, in which formerly malevolent beings take on a more righteous role. Building on the imagery of the yaksha, the developers expanded his character into that of a guardian who protects the Geo Archon. Xiao's epithet "Alatus" and associated animal imagery derive from Miqi Luo, one of the Twelve Heavenly Generals who presides over the rooster in the Chinese zodiac. He is associated with Golden Winged Great Peng, a convergence between the Buddhist Garuda and the Taoist Peng.

A comparison released by miHoYo showing the difference between Xiao's initial concept art and final design

Xiao is portrayed as a young warrior who protects the peace in Liyue. His appearance during the annual Lantern Rite echoes the Chinese New Year custom of "driving away the Nian beast". Xiao's earliest concept art was among the first character designs for Liyue created by the team. For his visual design, Xiao was initially conceived with the benevolent and gentle appearance traditionally associated with gods in China, with red as his primary color. However, once the design team aligned his personality to be a cold, taciturn guardian, the main color palette shifted to teal and white to match the colors used for Anemo, the wind element which he can control. His lower half was redesigned with darker purplish tones to convey the corruption he absorbed over years of battling monsters tainted with supernatural filth. The same design logic informed the light-colored highlights in his dark green hair and the interwoven light and dark teal particle effects used in his attack animations. To add a sense of historical depth, jade ornaments and other small accessories were placed on his legs, sleeves and shoulders. His outfit adapts a modern aesthetic to emphasize his youth, incorporating close-fitting combat armor adorned with ritual implements such as a vajra and a small censer. Additional elements like front and back flaps and flowing ribbons accentuate mobility and fluidity. Xiao dons a yaksha mask in combat, the design of which draws from nuomian, the masks used in traditional Nuo dance. The colors of the mask were chosen to be black, blue and gold to create a fierce, intimidating image.

Xiao's combat animations were inspired by multiple wuxia films including Flying Swords of Dragon Gate and Young Detective Dee: Rise of the Sea Dragon, and were produced using motion capture technology. For the soundtrack, HOYO-MiX composer Yuan Dimeng stated that the team chose to reuse musical motifs associated with Xiao to evoke familiarity, including themes from his gameplay trailer.

Xiao is voiced in Japanese by Yoshitsugu Matsuoka, who chose to deliberately pitch his voice very low during recording due to the character's status. Xiao also displays different emotions depending on whom he is speaking to (sometimes gentle, sometimes stern) so Matsuoka tried to reflect these nuances as much as possible during the voice-over sessions. Xiao's Chinese voice actor is Kinsen, and he is voiced in English by Laila Berzins. His Korean voice actor was originally Jung Yu-mi (who also voices Beidou), but beginning in version 1.2, the role was re-cast with Shim Gyu-hyuk.

== Appearances ==
In the game, Xiao is the last surviving yaksha in Liyue. He is often honored with the title "Conqueror of Demons". Before the Archon War two thousand years before the game's events took place, Xiao had been enslaved by another god, forced to commit countless crimes including murder. After the Geo Archon defeated the god who enslaved him, Xiao was freed and given the name "Xiao." (Note: In the game's lore, he had previously been known only as "Alatus".) In return for this, Xiao accepted the Geo Archon's mandate and, together with the other yaksha, protected Liyue from evil. After the death of the defeated gods, their accumulated resentment manifested as corruption and hallucinations, threatening Liyue's safety. Xiao fought these manifestations for centuries, becoming tainted by the residual filth of the fallen gods and enduring excruciating pain as a result. The Anemo Archon, Venti, once saved Xiao at Dihua Marsh after he collapsed under the weight of this karmic miasma, and Xiao has since regarded him as his benefactor. All of Xiao's yaksha companions died centuries before the game's events, and he has long been prepared to sacrifice himself for others' sake.

In the game's main story, Xiao learns from the protagonist Traveler that the Geo Archon has died. He joins the other adepti to confront the Liyue Qixing (Liyue's human governing body) demanding accountability for this. However, a Fatui diplomat named Tartaglia summons an ancient god to destroy Liyue Harbor, forcing both sides to suspend their confrontation to defeat the threat. Working together, they successfully defeat the god and later reconcile. Later, in a quest called "Perilous Trail", Xiao investigates the death of an unknown yaksha in the Chasm, an area of Liyue that borders Sumeru. He descends into the sealed depths and encounters the Traveler and their companions, who have fallen in by accident. Together, they uncover traces of the unnamed yaksha and learned that he was actually Bosacius, the yakshas' leader. The group eventually breaks the seal and escapes, but at the final moment Xiao exhausts his strength. He resolves to sacrifice himself to send the others to safety, but is ultimately saved through the intervention of the Geo Archon Zhongli.

The story quest "Perilous Trail" further explores Xiao's emotional bonds and long-standing attachments. In the story, Xiao proposes sacrificing himself so that his companions can escape the sealed domain, reaffirming his long-held fixation with the idea of "ultimate sacrifice". Yelan, who experiences a parallel situation during the quest, rejects his fatalistic suggestion. Towards the end of the quest, Xiao expends all his strength to send his companions upward and out of the Chasm, falling into the abyss himself. Ultimately, with the Traveler's reassurance, Xiao reconciles with himself and recognizes that the fallen yaksha were not doomed victims of fate as he had previously thought, but heroes who chose to protect others. Freed from survivor's guilt, he gradually opens his heart to those who care for him over the course of the entire chapter.

In terms of gameplay, Xiao is a five-star Anemo character who uses a polearm in combat. His Elemental Skill, one of the main ways characters can deal damage, allows him to dash rapidly (even in midair), striking enemies in his path. His Elemental Burst places him in an enhanced state, greatly increasing his jumping ability and enabling powerful plunging attacks.

== Promotion ==
Xiao first appeared as a non-player character in the Liyue chapter of the main story in version 1.0 of the game, and was later released as a playable character in version 1.3. During the Version 1.3 preview livestream on January 22, 2021, miHoYo officially announced Xiao's gameplay kit and release date. On January 27, the company released the story teaser "Yakshas: The Guardian Adepti", which introduced the backstories of Xiao and the other yakshas and on February 2, miHoYo released Xiao's gameplay demonstration trailer, called "Doombane." The following day, Version 1.3 was released, accompanied by a detailed gameplay overview for Xiao. miHoYo also released his signature weapon, the "Primordial Jade Winged-Spear."

== Reception ==
Xiao has been widely embraced by players, who express their appreciation through fan art, videos and cosplay. According to Game Grape, on February 3, 2021, when Xiao was first released as a playable character, the mobile version of Genshin Impact alone generated over US$15 million in revenue on that day. A year later, in version 2.7, the banner featuring him and Yelan once again broke the game's records, reaching over US$9.8 million on iOS on release day and surpassing US$22 million in its first week, breaking the record previously held by the Raiden Shogun. Some fans even started rituals to help increase their chances of getting Xiao on the gacha banners, to which Yahoo News writer Sisi Jiang commented in an interview with Polygon that she thought it had something to do with the "community camaraderie".

In terms of character design, TheGamer's Jessica Clark Dillon described Xiao as one of the saddest characters in Genshin Impact. She says that despite his appearance, he has a sweet side to him and "has a kind heart that seeks to be loved, despite the fact that he is in an endless cycle of battling enemies". He becomes genuinely delighted when the Traveler thanks him, and he is happy to travel together with them. Game Grape critic Grey Carrier similarly wrote that Xiao embodies a tension between his outward presentation and inner self. As an adeptus, he is aloof, stern, and difficult to approach, but his pure, gentle and socially awkward nature emerges beginning with the scene in which the Traveler lures him out from his hiding place with some almond tofu. Grey Carrier argued that Xiao cares deeply for the Traveler and intervenes whenever they are in danger. He argued that Xiao's lore is reflected in that as Liyue's guardian, although he distances himself from human affairs, he still takes joy in the region's prosperity and harmony. Grey Carrier also wrote that Xiao is trapped by his past; uncertain how to handle new relationships and afraid that his murderous impulses might harm others, he longs for social connection and friendship while simultaneously fearing it, watching over people from afar.

Cian Maher of TheGamer commented that one of the main reasons why he was excited for Xiao's release was because of the potential to get more insight into "one of the most fascinating facets" of the game's lore. Maher also commented that he thought it was funny that Xiao was one of the only characters to explicitly threaten to eat Paimon, concluding his analysis by stating that he expected the audience would get "a good, hearty laugh" out of Xiao. Kotaku's Sisi Jiang criticized his English voice acting as overly aggressive, sounding as though he is constantly at the breaking point, whereas the performance in the original Chinese came across as gentler, more distant, and unconcerned. Jiang suggested the discrepancy may stem from differences in voice direction and cultural interpretation, but ultimately argued that the English performance overexerts itself emotionally, causing the delivery to feel too forceful.

In October 2022, a middle-school bulletin board in Michigan became embroiled in controversy when a doodle of Xiao's mask was mistaken by parents for a Satanic hate symbol. The school ultimately announced that it would retain much of the original board design but removed several drawings, including the mask. Kotaku's Sisi Jiang commented that since Xiao's mask is based on the Chinese nuo mask tradition, the incident demonstrated how intolerant some people can be against non-white cultures. Jiang suggested that as Genshin Impact continues to enter mainstream Western awareness, white audiences will be "forced to grapple with" influences from diverse cultures.
