= 2024–2025 SAG-AFTRA video game strike =

American union strike

- Date: July 26, 2024 – July 9, 2025 (11 months, 1 week and 6 days)
- Location: United States
- Caused by: Disagreements over the terms of a new labor contract
- Goals: Improved protections over the use of artificial intelligence; Unionizing non-union projects (HoYoverse only)
- Methods: Picketing; Strike action
- Result: Tentative agreement reached on June 9, 2025; Strike suspended on June 11, 2025; Agreement ratified on July 9, 2025 (See Impact and Aftermath)

Parties
SAG-AFTRA	Activision Productions; Blindlight; Disney Character Voices; Electronic Arts Productions; Epic Games; Formosa Interactive; Insomniac Games; Llama Productions; Take-Two Interactive; VoiceWorks Productions; Warner Bros. Games; HoYoverse (independent strike)

On July 26, 2024, the Screen Actors Guild – American Federation of Television and Radio Artists labor union initiated a strike that lasted until July 9, 2025. The grievance involved the union's voice actors and motion capture artists against American video game companies signed to the union's interactive media agreements over failed renegotiation terms of a contract that had expired in November 2022.

The strike was authorized in September 2023 and started after a year and a half of negotiations which failed to result in a protection agreement from the use of artificial intelligence (AI) for all performers covered by the interactive media agreement. In addition to video game performers, there were concerns about companies having the ability to train AI to replicate an actor's voice or create a digital replica of their likeness without consent or fair compensation.

The strike was also notable for its unofficial (Note: HoYoverse was not officially targeted in the list of companies in the beginning of the strike.) independent strike against Hoyoverse games. The striking voice actors, in addition to asking for AI protections, called for a union agreement to be signed between Hoyoverse and SAG-AFTRA. This mostly resulted in the recasting of the striking voice actors.

On June 9, 2025, SAG-AFTRA announced that a tentative agreement had been reached, and on June 11, the strike was suspended. The agreement was overwhelmingly ratified on July 9, 2025, officially ending the strike.

== Background ==
With generative AI becoming more sophisticated in the early 2020s, game developers have seen potential to reduce labor costs by substituting AI for human performers. Additionally, mass layoffs in the video game industry from 2023 onwards have led to concerns about the future sustainability of game development, as this led to the cancellation of several game projects and shutdown of several studios. AI has been explored as one solution to mitigate the rising development costs of games, including costs associated with hiring voice-over and motion capture actors. Backstage said unionized voice actor may make $450–2000 per day. While AI could potentially reduce or even eliminate these costs, this has also led to significant concerns from video game actors of all sectors, including unwanted replication of voice and likeness, job security, and lack of compensation.

In November 2022, the Interactive Media Agreement expired and was subsequently extended on a monthly basis. On September 1, 2023, the SAG-AFTRA National Board voted to send the video game strike authorization vote to its members, and on September 25, the authorization passed with 98.32% voting in favor. Months of negotiations were held between SAG-AFTRA and major video game companies such as Activision, Blindlight, Electronic Arts (EA), Epic Games, Insomniac, Take-Two Interactive, Disney Character Voices and Warner Bros. Games without results.

In January 2024, SAG-AFTRA announced an agreement with Replica Studios for voice model replicas in video game. The agreement included requirements for consent for any new project, safe storage of voice model replicas, time limits for replica usage without further payment, and usage transparency.

== Strike ==
=== Strike actions ===
On July 25, 2024, SAG-AFTRA president Fran Drescher and chief negotiator Duncan Crabtree-Ireland announced that SAG-AFTRA would go on strike against major video game publishers. Crabtree-Ireland affirmed that the strike would become effective on July 26, 2024, saying, "The justification that the video game bargaining group is articulating is designed to try and sound good to the public, to provide cover for creating a repository of actors and performances that they can use without informed consent or fair compensation, especially targeting actors who don't have the individual leverage to block them." Roughly 2,600 people employed in the video game industry in voice acting, motion capture and other work would then go on strike.

On September 24, 2024, SAG-AFTRA called for a strike against League of Legends after accusing Formosa Interactive, who contribute post-production audio work to the game, of making an effort to evade the strike. According to SAG-AFTRA, Formosa Entertainment "secretly transferred an unrelated title to a shell company and sent out casting notices for 'non-union' talent only." SAG-AFTRA's interactive negotiating committee would unanimously vote to file an unfair labor practice charge against Formosa Interactive with the National Labor Relations Board. Part of this charge called for a strike against League of Legends. In response, Formosa released a statement stating that it has denied the allegations and has not acted in any way to undermine employee or union rights. However, Riot Games, the developer and publisher of League of Legends, also released a statement stating that they have only instructed Formosa Interactive to engage with US union performers and that SAG-AFTRA's press release relates that cancelling a game or hiring non-union talent are related to a game not developed and/or published by them, stating that "we've never asked Formosa to cancel a game that we've registered."

On May 19, 2025, SAG-AFTRA filed an unfair labor practice charge on Llama Productions, a subsidiary of Epic Games, alleging the company replaced actors' work by using artificial intelligence to generate Darth Vader's voice in Fortnite without notice.

=== Negotiations and agreement ===
On October 15, 2024, it was announced that SAG-AFTRA officials and representatives for video game companies would hold in-person negotiations again for the first time since November 2023 starting on October 23, 2024.

On October 28, 2024, SAG-AFTRA announced a partnership deal with AI company Ethovox for voice model replicas, the deal included session fees and revenue sharing with the union. On the same day, the union announced that the strike will continue after days of negotiations with video game companies.

On November 14, 2024, SAG-AFTRA announced a new type of agreement for video game localization, called Independent Interactive Localization Agreement. This agreement was designed to allow video game developers based outside of the United States to hire union voice actors for the purpose of content localization subject to terms of the agreement.

On March 11, 2025, SAG-AFTRA said that while they have reached agreements related to pay and performance protections with video game publishers, they were still "frustratingly far apart" on issues with potential uses of AI to replace actors.

On May 13, 2025, a "best, last and final" offer was made to SAG-AFTRA, with the proposed terms stripping out language related to the unlimited digital replica buyout, thus agreeing to pay performers for using a digital replica on comparable rates for direct work from performers, and including language that would restrict the companies from creating digital replicas from works not covered by the interactive media agreement as a means to bypass the requirements for replicas created from covered works.

On June 9, 2025, SAG-AFTRA announced that they reached a tentative agreement with the video game companies, with a ratification of the agreement expected in the coming days. The deal "puts in place the necessary AI guardrails that defend performers' livelihoods in the AI age, alongside other important gains", according to the union's executive director Duncan Crabtree-Ireland. The union suspended the strike on June 11, 2025, on anticipation that the board and the union members would vote in favor of the new agreement. The national board approved of the new agreement on June 12. Voting on the strike deal by SAG-AFTRA members began on June 18 and concluded on July 9. The agreement was overwhelmingly ratified with 95.04% of the votes in favor.

== Impact ==
On September 4, 2024, Lightspeed LA, a division of Tencent's Lightspeed Studios, signed an interim agreement with the union to continue to work with its actors. SAG-AFTRA announced the following day that 80 games had signed acceptable interim agreements with the union, allowing actors to return to work on those games and putting more pressure on the larger publishers.

On September 17, 2024, California Governor Gavin Newsom officially signed two bills, AB 1836, which grants protections against AI being used on dead performers and grants rights to performers' estate, and AB 2602, which grants protections against AI being used on living performers without it being spelled out with reasonable specificity. The bills include protections for voice-over work and video game performances (ex. motion capture work) and were signed at SAG-AFTRA headquarters with support from union leadership. Protections against AI for motion capture work is of particular note, as SAG-AFTRA leadership has cited the identity of motion capture professionals as performers (which directly impact AI regulations) as a significant reason for initiating the strike, as well as one of the most heated points of disagreement with video game companies.

=== Independent labour action on HoYoverse ===
When the SAG-AFTRA strike began, voice actors working for various games of HoYoverse (global brand of miHoYo) games began a separate labour action as well, calling for the same demands as the union strike but also for a union agreement between HoYoverse and SAG-AFTRA to be signed. While HoYoverse was not on the list of struck companies released by SAG-AFTRA, SAG-AFTRA called for a contract to be signed with them.

Starting from March 2025, HoYoverse announced recastings of multiple voice actors in their games, which included Genshin Impact, Honkai: Star Rail, and Zenless Zone Zero. Most of the original voice actors cited the strike as their reason for withholding their voice, including Nicholas Thurkettle (Von Lycaon), Emeri Chase (Soldier 11) and John Patneaude (Kinich). Most notably, Patneaude's replacement, Jacob Takanashi, received backlash from striking voice actors after announcing his new role, with many of them accusing him of being a scab. In response, players defended Takanashi from the aforementioned backlash and criticized the rudeness and lack of professionalism from the voice actors. Nathan Nokes, who voices the character Ororon in Genshin Impact, defended Takanashi and asked others to be "gracious, kind and respectful even when you disagree".

In May 2025, following the perceived silence from SAG-AFTRA on the "best, last, and final" offer, some voice actors started to call on SAG-AFTRA to end the strike, including Allegra Clark (Beidou/Acheron) and Chris Tergliafera (Il Capitano), claiming that AAA companies were actively moving out of the U.S. to look for other voice actors. Conversely, other voice actors such as Corina Boettger (Paimon) and Kayli Mills (Keqing) continued to defend the strike, asserting that they would not return to voicing unless HoYoverse signed the interim agreement.

== Aftermath ==
With a new agreement between SAG-AFTRA and the American game industry reached in July 2025, SAG-AFTRA members would be guaranteed annual wage increase for three years, increased compensation for union games, and some guardrails to prevent American game companies from giving their work to AI, including consent and disclosure requirements for AI digital replica use and the ability for performers to suspend consent for the generation of new material during a strike.

Following the strike's suspension, most voice actors who previously were not credited due to the strike came out with their respective roles. While the new agreement was largely seen as a victory for union members, SAG-AFTRA received criticism from some voice actors for allegedly intentionally prolonging the negotiation process, making it difficult for performers to obtain work, as well as incentivizing video game companies to look for non-US voice actors.

Jennifer Hale said that the voice actor community was relieved to have the freedom to work again, and that the community was profoundly impacted by the economic ramifications of the strike.

Sean Chiplock stated that despite the main strike ending, some HoYoverse voice actors, including himself, were still striking in an "independent collective work refusal". As a result, HoYoverse continued to recast multiple voice actors even after the main strike ended.

== See also ==
- 2023 SAG-AFTRA strike
