= Kaedehara Kazuha =

Fictional character in a video game

- Genshin Impact character
- First game: Genshin Impact (2021)
- Voiced by: EN: Mark Whitten; ZH: Banma; JA: Nobunaga Shimazaki; KO: Kim Shin-woo

In-universe information
- Weapon: Sword
- Home: Inazuma
- Element: Anemo

Kaedehara Kazuha (Chinese: 枫原万叶; pinyin: Fēngyuán Wànyè) is a character from Genshin Impact, a 2020 action role-playing gacha game developed by miHoYo. Added in a 2021 update for the game, he was introduced as a playable character in version 1.6. He is depicted as a wandering samurai from the fictional nation of Inazuma. His design draws inspiration from the samurai code of bushido, traditional ideals such as honor and loyalty, as well as from Man'yōshū poetry and traditional Japanese warrior imagery. His character design reflects influences from anime aesthetics and culture. His portrayal in the story and his combat gameplay both received praise from critics.

== Design and voice acting ==
In the game's lore, Kazuha hails from the Kaedehara clan, a once-prestigious swordsmithing family who practices the "Isshin Art". His clan had already fallen into decline by the time he was a child, and after his parents' deaths Kazuha became a wandering samurai. The character's conceptual design is inspired by the samurai ideals of bushido like honor (Japanese: 名, Hepburn: mei) and loyalty (忠, chū), mixed with elements of Chinese wuxia philosophy notions like chivalry. His combat voice lines were inspired by verses from Japan's classical poetry anthology Man'yōshū. In Japanese, his speech reflects that of traditional samurai, using the humble first-person pronoun sessha (拙者; "this unworthy one") and the archaic verb gozaru (ござる) at the end of sentences.

Kazuha is voiced in Japanese by Nobunaga Shimazaki. In interviews, Shimazaki described Kazuha as an outwardly cool, refined, mysterious and elegant young man, but also said that upon getting to know him, he found Kazuha to be curious, humorous and slightly mischievous. Shimazaki initially said he put emphasis on Kazuha's mystique and composure in his performance, but that he later began displaying Kazuha's youthful and playful qualities. He said Kazuha has both a philosophical calmness and a relatable warmth to himself, and that he aimed to express the character's multifaceted personality through his acting. Kazuha is voiced in English by Mark Whitten, in Chinese by Banma, and in Korean by Kim Shin-woo.

== Appearances ==
=== Lore ===
The Kaedehara clan are practitioners of the "Isshin Art", one of the five great swordsmithing arts collectively known as the Raiden Gokaden and overseen by the Yashiro Commission. Centuries prior to the game's events, the Raiden Gokaden were nearly wiped out when they became the targets of a blacksmith called Kunikuzushi. By Kazuha's time, only the "Amenoma Art" and "Isshin Art" remained of the Raiden Gokaden. Having lost both of his parents and seen his family fall into ruin, Kazuha abandoned his ancestral home and began a life of wandering across Teyvat. During his travels, Kazuha received a Vision, marking him as chosen by the gods. When the Raiden Shogun enacted the Vision Hunt Decree, a law to confiscate all Visions in Inazuma, Kazuha witnessed a friend of his challenge the Shogun and be killed as a result. Amid the chaos, Kazuha seized his dying friend's Vision and escaped Inazuma, joining the crew of the Alcor, a ship run by Beidou, in Liyue.

In the Inazuma chapter of the Archon Quest, Kazuha recounts Inazuma's political situation to the Traveler and accompanies them to Inazuma aboard the Alcor. Later, he joins Beidou's fleet in supporting a resistance against the Raiden Shogun led by Sangonomiya Kokomi. Fighting alongside the rebels, they launch an assault on Tenshukaku, the Raiden Shogun's place of residence. As the Traveler is attacked by one of the Shogun's lightning strikes, Kazuha channels his friend's Vision as well as his own in order to intercept the Shogun's attack and protect the Traveler.

In the version 2.6 flagship event, Kazuha teams up with companions he meets during the Irodori Festival to investigate the mysteries of the Raiden Gokaden. Through this, he learns the lost truth behind the swordsmithing schools' downfall and the deep vendetta involving his clan and Kunikuzushi. Ultimately, Kazuha decides to let go of the past and live in the moment. By the end he finds peace with himself, accepting his purpose in life.

=== Gameplay ===
Kaedehara Kazuha is a 5-star Anemo sword user. His Elemental Skill pulls in nearby enemies and objects, using wind currents to launch himself upward before performing a powerful plunging attack from midair. His Elemental Burst creates a swirling field of Anemo-infused slashes; when this field comes into contact with Hydro, Pyro, Cryo or Electro elements, it absorbs that element to deal additional corresponding damage to enemies. This ability also provides various supportive buffs to the team, enhancing their elemental damage output in battle.

== Promotion and reception ==
Kaedehara Kazuha's development process had challenges in regards to the character's name. Kazuha was originally named Kiryuu Kazuha (Chinese: 桐生万葉; pinyin: Tóngshēng Wànyè) in early development, but it was reportedly changed to avoid association with Hololive idol Kiryu Coco, who faced a boycott from Chinese fans for comments regarding Taiwan.

Kaedehara Kazuha first appeared during the Genshin Impact version 1.6 promotional livestream on May 28, 2021. Developer miHoYo released his official character illustration on June 7, followed by his character teaser on June 23 and combat demo on June 27. Kazuha made his in-game debut in the version 1.6 Archon Quest and served as a key figure in the Inazuma chapter of the game's main storyline. On June 29, Kazuha was released as a playable character along with his signature weapon, "Freedom-Sworn".

On September 19, 2022, miHoYo collaborated with automobile manufacturer Cadillac to release a special itasha edition of the Cadillac CT4 luxury sedan featuring a design based on Kazuha. Critic huangrandou of Chinese car website PC Auto called the car "sporty" due to its color scheme and said it was fun to drive. In September 2024, Genshin Impact partnered with McDonald's in the United States to offer limited-edition menu items, including a themed apple pie set featuring Kazuha and Beidou. Similar to the cars, purchasers would receive in-game items. Many players who participated in the event reported that the rewards they were promised were either missing or delayed. miHoYo posted on their official social media accounts addressing players' concerns as a result of this.

Kazuha was generally well received. Players expressed appreciation for Kazuha through fan art, roleplay and cosplay. Stephanie Liu of Siliconera said in June 2021 that his "maple leaf aesthetic and cool personality" perfectly contrast between Inazuma and the beach event that was happening in-game at the time. Yan Ku of Yahoo News expressed approval of Kazuha's plot arc as well, and described it as a bittersweet journey of nostalgia that explores his tragic past. She concluded that this story conveys a universal message that everyone has regrets and wants redemption but that the past shouldn't define us. Claudia Mihu of the East-West Cultural Passage compared his voice lines in Chinese with his English ones, writing that the Chinese version adds depth and elegance to his character, while the English version is more simplified and sacrifices nuance for clarity and brevity. She writes that the differences in translation change how Kazuha's personality is perceived between languages.

Lin Zhuoheng of Hong Kong news website HK01 said he was one of the most popular male characters in the game, and called Kazuha's character design truly exceptional due to his warm personality. He wrote that Kazuha combines popular anime elements such as silver hair, rōnin and Japanese swords. Lin praised Kazuha's performance in the storyline, saying that he is one of the most three-dimensional characters in the game, and that this is shown when he intercepted the Raiden Shogun's attack to defend the Traveler. Lin also praised his voice acting, writing that Nobunaga's performance particularly captivated many female players.
