= Paimon (Genshin Impact) =

Video game character and mascot

- Genshin Impact character
- Promotional artwork
- First game: Genshin Impact (2020)
- Voiced by: English: Corina Boettger (2020–2025); Penelope Rawlins (2025–present); Chinese: Duoduo Poi; Japanese: Aoi Koga; Korean: Kim Ga-ryung

In-universe information
- Species: Unknown (Note: She has been referred to by some as a fairy, but this has yet to be confirmed officially.)
- Origin: Celestia

Paimon (Chinese: 派蒙; pinyin: Pàiméng) is a character from Genshin Impact, a 2020 action role-playing gacha game developed by miHoYo. She serves as the mascot for the game and its official website. She also serves as a guide who accompanies the game's protagonist, the Traveler, on their adventures across the world of Teyvat. She has the appearance of a small flying fairy that speaks on the player's behalf and teaches them how to play the game. The character was originally voiced in English by Corina Boettger, who was replaced in 2025 with Penelope Rawlins. In other languages, she is voiced by Duoduo Poi in Chinese, Aoi Koga in Japanese, and Kim Ga-ryung in Korean.

Paimon has been met with mixed responses from critics and fans, with some liking her dialogue when insulting other characters, but with others criticizing her role as the player's guide. A recurring joke throughout Genshin Impact describes Paimon as "emergency food", with the joke becoming an internet meme amongst the community. Others have questioned the exact nature of her character, comparing her to characters seen in previous miHoYo works.

== Design and voice ==
Paimon resembles a fairy, appearing as a toddler that flies around. Her color scheme is primarily white and gold, with her outfit having an inverted triquetra symbol on her chest. She has a singular sock on one of her legs, and has sleeves with similar designs to statues in Genshin Impact that represent an Archon, the game's equivalent of a god. She also has a hairclip and a cape with a galaxy pattern. The real-world etymology of her name derives from the 17th-century text Ars Goetia, where Paimon is established as one of the kings of hell. Paimon's species is not confirmed, but several lines in the Snezhnaya arc of the game's plot indicate that she may be a fae, although they did not confirm this for certain. However, it was confirmed during the Snezhnaya arc that Paimon is originally from Celestia, an island floating above Teyvat.

Paimon was originally voiced by Corina Boettger in English, but due to the 2024–2025 SAG-AFTRA video game strike, Boettger was replaced with Penelope Rawlins. According to Boettger, the original audition materials called for a "fairy type" voice that was not very cartoon-like, but during recording, the team asked her to raise the character's pitch. Boettger expected the role to be a one-time job, but was surprised to learn that the game was a continuous project which would require much more recording over the course of "at least three to five years". In other languages, Paimon is voiced by Aoi Koga in Japanese, Duoduo Poi in Chinese, and Kim Ga-ryung in Korean. In English, Paimon primarily refers to herself in third-person. Her dialogue in Genshin Impact includes insulting and making fun of other characters, often giving them rude nicknames when they annoy her.

== Appearances ==
Paimon is Genshin Impact's mascot and guide. She first appears within the first few minutes of the game, after being rescued from drowning by the Traveler, the game's protagonist. Afterwards, she teaches the player how to play the game. She additionally serves as the Traveler's voice, speaking in their stead, while the Traveler seldom speaks themselves. Her design, personality, and movements were tailored to make it clear to players that she is their guide. A running gag in the game is that the character is often referred to as "emergency food", something that annoys her significantly. This first occurs in the beginning of the game, where the player has the option to refer to her as such.

Outside of Genshin Impact, the character has been used as the face of the game on social media, with the developers using her as a "spokesperson" and answering questions in-character during the game's release. Additionally, emails from miHoYo for game-related promotions as well as in-game correspondence are signed "P.A.I.M.O.N." She has additionally been used as the face for online games on miHoYo's websites related to the title, such as Paimon's Starlight Expedition and Mesmerizing Dream at Sea. In September 2025, a costume of Paimon that players could equip was added to Among Us (2018).

== Promotion and reception ==
As the game's mascot, Paimon has been featured extensively in the game's promotional material, being used as the game's icon and having several figures made of her. In September 2022, around the second anniversary of Genshin Impact, miHoYo hosted an event called "Giant Paimon's Global Endless Journey", where a giant inflatable of the character went on a tour across the world from Singapore to London, with her journey in London going down the River Thames. Fans who met up at the inflatable during its stops were able to win merchandise, and users of TikTok who posted videos related to the event had the opportunity to win in-game awards.

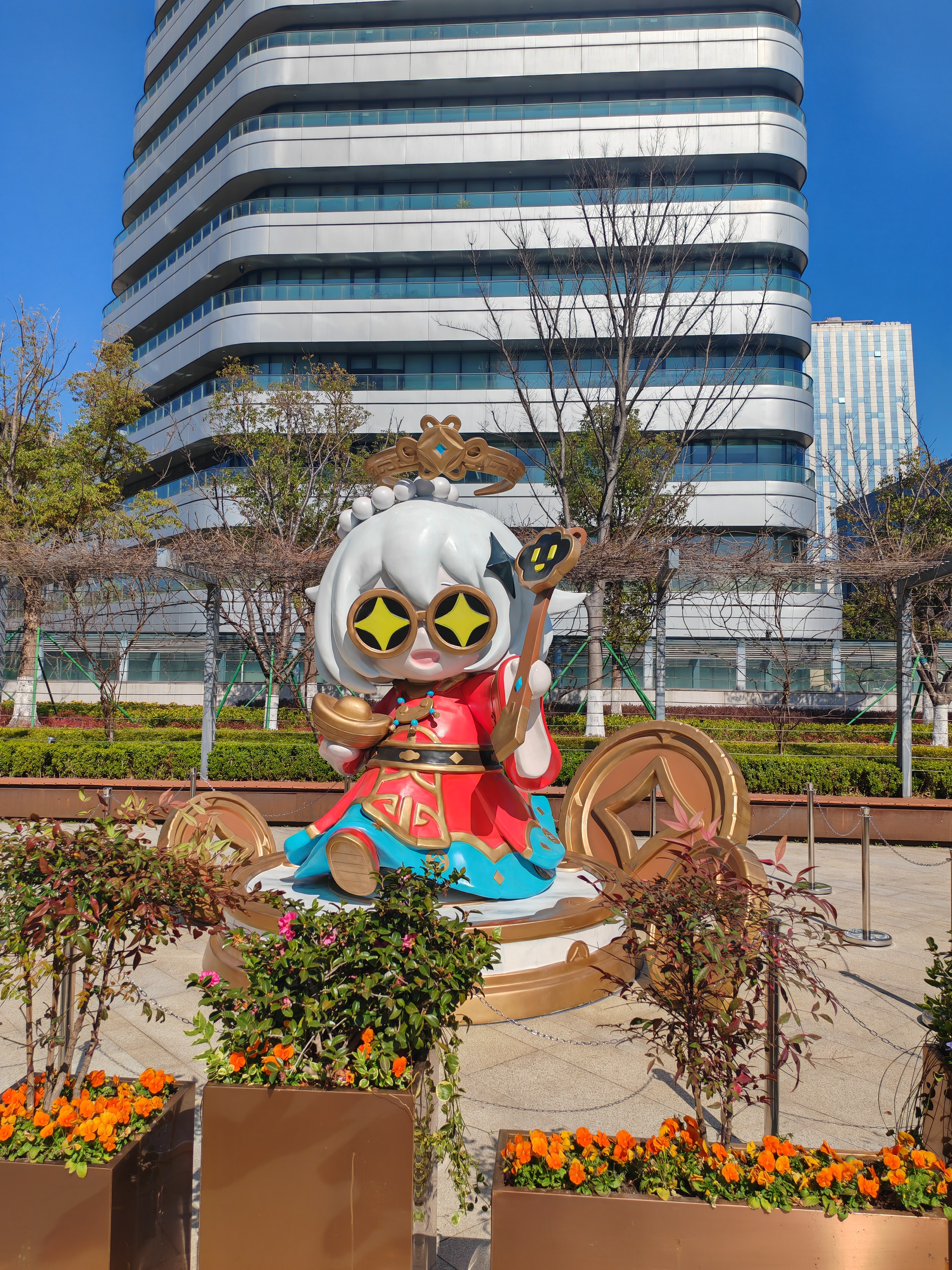
A statue of Paimon outside of miHoYo's office building in Shanghai

Paimon has been met with mixed opinions from critics and fans alike. PC Gamer's James Davenport heavily criticized Paimon's role as a guide. He wrote that Paimon was Genshin Impact practicing a "failed tradition" in a "post Ocarina of Time world" where players did not need to be told things they already knew. He additionally criticized Paimon's dialogue for being high-pitched and referring to herself in third-person. Sisi Jiang of Kotaku echoed similar sentiments, writing that Paimon referring to herself in third-person led to Jiang choosing to play the game using the Chinese audio instead. Jiang also criticized the English localization, saying it did not properly reflect Paimon's character compared to the original Chinese. Chuapp commentator Xiong Dongdong criticized Boettger for interpreting Paimon as an elf and for using a "loli voice" with an excessively high tone. In contrast, Xiong highly praised Koga's portrayal, believing that she was the most "scumbag"-like out of all Paimon's voice actresses, which they wrote was consistent with the Traveler. They wrote that the interaction between the two was full of dramatic tension. Xiong specifically said that when Koga imitated the speech of other characters, she could emphasize certain tones to achieve an ironic effect, and even if she occasionally cracked her voice, it still seemed very natural.

After Boettger was replaced as Paimon's English voice actress, Austin Wood of GamesRadar+ indicated that Rawlins' voice was significantly softer and lower than Boettger's and was also closer to the Japanese or Chinese versions. Wood observed that players' evaluation of Paimon's English voice had been divided, with some finding it cute while others thought her voice had become increasingly harsh with each version update. However, the initial reception of players to the new voice was generally very positive, with many comparing it to how Boettger's voice sounded during earlier versions of the game. Wood himself stated he preferred this new voice. Another editor for Kotaku, Nathan Grayson, had divisive opinions on Paimon, liking her dialogue as the game progressed and describing the character as talking "mad shit". However, he wrote Paimon to be a nuisance early in the game, describing her as an "even worse" version of Navi from Ocarina of Time. He summarized his thoughts on Paimon to be that she was "irritating as hell", but had an "acquired taste". A writer of Play viewed her character positively, writing that after playing the game for several hours, they "can't imagine travelling with anyone else".

In a podcast from Waypoint, the staff defended Paimon's character, saying that the banter between the Traveler and Paimon was "very fun", and that the implementation of Paimon speaking on the Traveler's behalf was "fairly clever and good". After it was said that someone previously asked "when do I get to kill Paimon?" when playing Genshin Impact, one of the members pointed out that Paimon shared the same name as a character from Hereditary, as well as being the name of one of the demons in The Lesser Key of Solomon. As a result, the staff jokingly stated that Paimon was actually evil, would be the game's final boss, and would kill everyone. Grayson wrote that Paimon behaved in ways that "can only be described as suspicious", noting a quest in the beginning of the game where Paimon strongly desires a sword that turns out to be non-existent. Grayson additionally reported that some fans speculated on whether Paimon was the true villain of Genshin Impact. In April 2023, it was reported by GamesRadar+ that numerous fans of Honkai: Star Rail (2023), another game developed by miHoYo, found the game's protagonist and writing to be better than that of Genshin Impact due to the game lacking a character similar to Paimon.

Grayson wrote that the first instance of Paimon being referred to as "emergency food" was a "legitimately funny scene" that subverted his expectations with the game, which he expected to be more serious. This joke became popular amongst the game's community, becoming an internet meme. Grayson wrote that most fan works involving the character usually had something to do with the emergency food meme. While finding most of these memes to be funny, he wrote that some of them were "uncomfortably leery" due to Paimon's childlike appearance. In August 2021, a series of six figures from HOBBY Watch were released that depict Paimon in food-related situations, such as being rolled into pasta. The food depicted in the figures is reminiscent of the food players can cook in the game.

A paper by Indonesian scholars analyzed the dialogue between the Traveler and Paimon from the perspective of pragmatics, finding that the Traveler primarily uses strategies of impoliteness toward Paimon, including belittling Paimon's body size and abilities, as well as comparing Paimon to a pet. However, the authors emphasized that this impoliteness is best categorized as mock impoliteness or camaraderie, and that its purpose is not to truly offend, but to create humor, bring the two closer together, and show an intimate friendship between the two. The Traveler holds greater discursive power in these conversations and can joke freely, while Paimon responds using strategies of politeness, reflecting the Traveler's dominant position as the protagonist. The study argued that this linguistic phenomenon, in which impoliteness is interpreted politely, can only occur between people with a close relationship, and precisely demonstrates the deep, family-like bond between the Traveler and Paimon.
