= Sandrone (Genshin Impact) =

Fictional character in a video game

- Genshin Impact character
- Sandrone in Genshin Impact
- First game: Genshin Impact (2025)
- Voiced by: EN: Deneen Melody; ZH: Hong Haitian; JA: Mariko Honda; KO: Kang Eun-ae

In-universe information
- Full name: Marionette Guillotin
- Alias: Marionette
- Species: Automaton
- Weapon: Greatsword
- Home: Fontaine
- Element: Cryo

Sandrone, (Note: /sænˈdroʊneɪ/ san-DROH-nay; Chinese: 桑多涅; pinyin: Sāngduōniè) real name Marionette Guillotin, (Note: gi-yo-TAN, Chinese: 小玛丽安·吉约丹; pinyin: Xiǎo Mǎlì'ān Jíyuēdān; lit. 'Little Mary-Ann Guillotin') is a fictional character in the video game Genshin Impact, developed by miHoYo. She first appeared in version "Luna I" of the game in 2025 and became playable in July 2026. In the game, Sandrone is the seventh of the Fatui Harbingers, one of the game's most important factions, for which she uses the codename Marionette. (Note: Chinese: 木偶; pinyin: Mù'ǒu; lit. 'puppet') Her name and design are derived from Sandrone, a stock character from Italian commedia dell'arte.

Sandrone's story is closely connected to the background lore of Genshin Impact's Narzissenkreuz quest series and explores themes including machinery and the soul, as well as reason and emotion. She plays a key role in the game's main storyline and has complex interactions with both the Traveler (the game's protagonist) and other Fatui Harbingers. Sandrone was generally received well, with reviews and commentary focusing on her emotionally affecting scenes and role in the story.

== Design and voice acting ==
The name "Sandrone" is derived from the stock character of the same name from Italian commedia dell'arte. In commedia dell'arte, Sandrone is a cunning, cruel man who is portrayed onstage by a puppet. Sandrone generally also has a family, also represented by puppets. Before becoming playable, Sandrone's design primarily featured a long dress and a yellow color scheme. Her playable design instead uses a red, white and black short-skirted outfit, with the length of her skirt significantly reduced and her hairstyle slightly adjusted. Her pupils were changed to resemble gears, while her headband uses the same design as that of her fellow Fatui Harbinger Columbina, but in a different color.

Sandrone is voiced in Chinese by Hong Haitian, in English by Deneen Melody, in Japanese by Mariko Honda, and in Korean by Kang Eun-ae. In an interview, Hong said that she initially assumed Sandrone was merely an arrogant and sardonic character. Hong compared Sandrone to a kitten: she hisses defensively at anyone who approaches her, but quietly feels happy when someone sincerely accepts her. She said that this tendency to "push others away to confirm that she is loved" lies at the heart of Sandrone's appeal. Hong also recalled that Sandrone's first appearance in the "A Winter Night's Lazzo" promotional video consisted only of a single line of dialog, which she recorded during the COVID-19 pandemic while under a blanket using a small microphone. The line was fully recorded as the subsequent storyline developed, allowing Hong to witness Sandrone's progression from a distant, mechanical figure into someone longing for emotional connection. Honda similarly stated that although she received background materials about Sandrone when recording for "A Winter Night's Lazzo", she only had one brief line. When the recording session ended, Honda found herself wondering, if this was acceptable. She initially believed Sandrone to be a coldhearted girl, but as she read further into the script, the character's more admirable qualities emerged gradually. Honda explained, "I wanted to convey the tenderness she is unable to express honestly, while taking care not to make her sound overly mature."

== Appearances ==
In the game's story, after bidding farewell to his childhood friends in the Narzissenkreuz Institute – an organization in Fontaine that was established to raise orphans and the children of criminals – researcher and inventor Alain Guillotin created a clockwork automaton on his sixty-fifth birthday, modeling and naming the automaton after his younger sister, Mary-Ann. He subsequently created a computational device named "Pulonia" as an assistant. Before his death, Alain instructed the automaton, who would later be known as Sandrone, to destroy all his manuscripts and deliver Pulonia to the Fontaine Research Institute, but she did not fully comply with his wishes. Following Alain's funeral, Sandrone remained alone until midnight before leaving. She later departed Fontaine for the nation of Snezhnaya, where she joined the Fatui Harbingers, gaining the codename "Marionette". To relieve her boredom, she regularly held tea parties, frequently inviting other Fatui Harbingers to attend. In the present, Sandrone is the Seventh of the Eleven Fatui Harbingers and the leader of Teyvat's Adventurer's Guild.

In the game's main storyline, Sandrone learns that the Traveler and Paimon have arrived in Nod-Krai and approaches them, warning them not to make an enemy of the Fatui. After the Traveler infiltrates a Fatui research center, Sandrone confronts them, but the encounter is disrupted by the warrior Rerir. An embarrassed Sandrone subsequently returns the Moon Marrow, a divine artifact sought by several competing factions, to the Traveler. When Rerir attacks again, Sandrone fights him but is ultimately rescued by Columbina, prompting her to angrily reject Columbina's help. Sandrone agrees to deliver Columbina's request for help to Arlecchino, another Fatui Harbinger, and later holds Rerir off while the others escape. As Columbina's powers begin to fail and she prepares to leave Teyvat, the Traveler and friends turn to Sandrone for help. Before Columbina's departure, she and Sandrone spend an evening together. Sandrone struggles to express her sadness at their separation, and Columbina gives her a hug before she can respond. Soon afterward, Il Dottore, another Fatui Harbinger, intercepts Columbina, and the two disappear, leaving her fate uncertain. Furious over Columbina's disappearance, Sandrone confronts Arlecchino and discovers that Dottore has sabotaged the research facility. She joins the Traveler's group and develops a magical calculation that would restore Columbina to Teyvat. During the final confrontation with Dottore, Sandrone shields the Traveler from a potentially fatal attack and is apparently killed. Sandrone had secretly placed the true version of her calculation elsewhere, allowing the plan to continue after her death. Columbina ultimately returns and defeats Dottore.

During a permanent storyline introduced in a limited-time event, Sandrone later reawakens in Fontaine and confirms that her calculations were successful and Columbina has returned to Teyvat. Although the extensive damage to her body initially prevents her from being revived, the sudden appearance of a Stellar Linchpin (a mysterious magical object) restores her. (Note: Sandrone is also the first character in the game to possess a Stellar Linchpin to help her control the elements instead of a Vision. A Vision is a magical device used to manipulate the elements.) After rebuilding her body, Sandrone detects an unexplained error within herself, which she initially believes to be a mechanical defect. Hoping to recover Alain's belongings, she conducts a search in Fontaine while concealing her activities from others. Sandrone and the Traveler find her former home with Alain, where she discovers his letter and an algorithm designed to reveal the nature of her soul. Using it, Sandrone confronts the emotional side of herself that she had long suppressed and mistaken for a mechanical defect. Rather than erase it, she accepts it as part of herself, describing the experience as the second birth of her soul. Sandrone subsequently helps resolve a supernatural problem involving wandering souls, partly to fulfill Alain's unfinished concern for his former friend René. With Citlali and the Traveler, she helps purify and free the spirits from their resentment. Afterward, Columbina teleports her onto the film set and embraces her in front of a Kamera, with the footage becoming the ending for a film in which Sandrone had agreed to participate. After the film's release, Sandrone visits Alain's grave, thanks him, and says that she is happy to have become part of his family. Afterwards, Sandrone appears in the Snezhnaya arc of the main storyline.

=== Gameplay ===
Sandrone is a 5-star character who deals Cryo damage and who wields a greatsword in battle. She is assisted in combat by an automaton named Fagio. Her central combat mechanic is called "Stellar-Conduct", which is caused by the interaction of Electro with Cryo and which creates a "Polestar Field" when triggered. While in this field, certain Cryo and Electro characters receive unique combat enhancements. Through the use of her Charged Attack, Sandrone can command Fagio to deal Stellar-Conduct damage and accumulate Decoding Power. When this reaches its limit, Fagio's attack interval becomes longer. Sandrone's Elemental Skill allows her to fire freely within the field while reducing Decoding Power. Her Elemental Burst launches an artillery bombardment, with its beam damage inside the field treated as Stellar-Conduct reaction damage.

== Promotion ==
Sandrone first appeared in a July 2022 teaser entitled "A Winter Night's Lazzo". In the video, she is shown sitting in the palm of a gigantic automaton. After hearing the other Fatui Harbingers arguing over the death of one of their own, she chuckles to herself and says, "utterly risible", remaining largely silent for the rest of the teaser. On July 22, 2025, miHoYo released the story teaser "Moonlit Ballad of the Night", which hinted that Sandrone would be appearing in a then-soon-to-be-released portion of the game's main storyline known as "Song of the Welkin Moon". She subsequently debuted as a non-player character in the "Luna I" version update, which was released along with the region of Nod-Krai on September 10. On May 25, 2026, miHoYo officially unveiled Sandrone's character artwork and profile information. On June 16, they released an animated short "The Final Gift", which centered on Sandrone's interactions with the other Fatui Harbingers and her in-game creator, Alain Guillotin. On June 25, miHoYo released the character teaser "The First Light of Dawn", depicting Sandrone's visit to her homeland of Fontaine, followed on June 30 by a character demo which detailed her gameplay called "Sandrone: To New Beginnings". She officially became playable the following day with the release of the "Luna VIII" update.

== Reception ==
A post on the game's official Japanese X (formerly Twitter) account which indicated that she would be playable received more than 300,000 likes and 28 million views. According to data from Sensor Tower, after Sandrone became playable, Genshin Impact briefly reached the top of the sales rankings on both the Apple App Store and Google Play. Fans have cosplayed Sandrone.

Writer Willow of Game Nadianshi praised the refinements made to Sandrone's character model for her playable release, particularly her new gear-shaped pupils and the more elaborate detailing of her clothing and headwear. Holly Alice of Pocket Tactics, however, was disappointed with Sandrone's playable design. She had expected Sandrone to be a Geo character who fought alongside Pulonia in gameplay. Instead, Sandrone was paired with a smaller automaton resembling a mannequin (Fagio), a sharp departure from the enormous machine featured in her initial promotional artwork. She also preferred Sandrone's original long dress and yellow color scheme, which she considered charming. In her view, the replacement red, white, and black short-skirted outfit neither suited a Cryo character nor distinguished her from the many other female Genshin Impact characters who wear short skirts with white stockings. She argued that a design closer to that of Noelle (whose outfit contains a long skirt and prominent metallic elements) would have better reflected Sandrone's background.

Hao Shen of the Macao Daily News wrote that Sandrone left a strong impression during the Nod-Krai storyline through her arrogant tsundere expressions. Willow described her as one of Genshin Impact's longest-developed characters: first introduced in the 2022 "A Winter Night's Lazzo" promotional video, she became highly popular after a year of buildup throughout the "Song of the Welkin Moon" storyline. Willow argued that, as the last surviving successor to the Narzissenkreuz legacy, Sandrone's personal story continues plotlines from Fontaine while linking Nod-Krai with Snezhnaya (of which Nod-Krai is a part), making her a point of intersection between the game's past and present. Her reunion and embrace with Columbina during the film festival was described as one of the update's most emotionally affecting scenes. Yekaterina Kuleshova of Igromania similarly observed that Sandrone's return after sacrificing herself in battle, and the broader themes of loss and reunion in her story, resonated with many players. Wang Linxi of Chuapp described Sandrone's return as one of the emotional centers of the update. Because her inclusion in the character banner had already been announced, players anticipated her return; the narrative therefore focused less on whether she would come back than on what followed: her reunion with Columbina, her reconciliation with the past, and her gradual understanding of what it means to have a family. Wang argued that Sandrone's homecoming not only reinforced the update's broader theme of searching for belonging, but also made players feel that she and the other characters genuinely inhabited Teyvat alongside them.
