= Columbina (Genshin Impact) =

Video game character

Columbina Hyposelenia
- Genshin Impact character
- Promotional artwork for Columbina
- First game: Genshin Impact (2025)
- Voiced by: EN: Emi Lo; ZH: Yang Menglu; JA: Lynn; KO: Yu Yeong

In-universe information
- Alias: The Damselette
- Weapon: Catalyst
- Home: Nod-Krai
- Element: Hydro

Columbina Hyposelenia (Chinese: 哥伦比娅·希珀塞莱尼娅; pinyin: Gēlúnbǐyà Xīpòsāiláiníyà), otherwise known as The Damselette (少女; Shào nǚ; 'maiden') is a fictional character in the video game Genshin Impact, developed by miHoYo. She debuted in the "Song of the Welkin Moon" update in September 2025 and became a playable character in January 2026. In the game's story, Columbina is a moon goddess who leaves her worshippers after becoming disillusioned with them and joins a powerful organization called the Fatui, becoming a powerful Harbinger there. She later abandons the Fatui upon discovering their intentions to exploit her powers. She subsequently befriends the game's protagonist, the Traveler, and eventually regains her full divine powers.

Columbina's character design received positive attention from the media. Critics generally consider her to be the main character of the Nod-Krai story arc. Her gameplay was also praised for its use of a new mechanic called Lunar Reactions.

== Development and design ==
When sharing design ideas for Columbina, the game's developers indicated that they wanted to create a character with a temperament that was "lonely and cold", but that gave off the feeling of someone innocent and pure yet unpredictable. The production team mentioned that one of the difficulties in character combat design was to balance Columbina's "light" temperament with the player's combat experience. During the early stages of design, the team experimented with various combat movements but scrapped them when the resulting impression did not meet their expectations. They ultimately settled on actions resembling "soft chanting" as her combat style. They said that a defining feature of Columbina is that she keeps her eyes closed most of the time, and the team created an animation for when she opens them. However, figuring out how to naturally transition back to a closed-eye state after she opens them became a technical challenge for the animation team.

The name "Columbina" is taken from the stock character of the same name in Italian commedia dell'arte, and her nickname "Kuutar" (库塔尔; Kùtǎ'ěr) may be derived from the moon goddess Kuutar in the Finnish tale Kalevala, in which the Finnish goddess of death, Louhi, is accused of theft only to be rescued by the protagonist Väinämöinen. In the game's story, she is kidnapped by the Fatui Harbinger Il Dottore, which Game*Spark believes echoes this.

Columbina is voiced in English by Emi Lo, in Chinese by Yang Menglu, in Japanese by Lynn and in Korean by Yu Yeong. In an interview, Yang and Lynn both indicated their understanding of Columbina was very limited at first because she only appeared briefly at the end of a promotional trailer called "A Winter Night's Lazzo". They gradually deepened their understanding of her as the game's plot progressed. Yang fell ill shortly before recording was scheduled to start; to prevent her hoarse voice from compromising the quality of the recording, she deliberately adopted a light and breathy vocal style. Afterwards, she felt anxious and monitored the reactions of fans online, discovering they had high expectations for Columbina. Once she recovered, she asked the production team to re-record her lines, but was only permitted to re-record a portion of them due to time constraints. They reassured her not to worry too much, however, as Columbina appears in a state of weakness at first. Lynn characterized Columbina as dazed and frail at first, so she incorporated breathiness into her voice to evoke a sense of fragility. She said that compared to the trailer, her performance in the game itself is softer and more ethereal; to further emphasize this, she paid special attention to her breathing sounds while Columbina was running, using light breaths to convey the character's movement, which is visually similar to floating.

Lynn also described Columbina as an innocent and childlike character who gradually develops a sense of belonging and self-awareness after meeting the Traveler, pointing out that although Columbina experiences loneliness and emptiness, she avoided excessive changes in emotion during recording. Lynn adjusted her technique to match Columbina's growth as the story progresses, as she was worried that players would want to skip her dialogue because of the character's slow manner of speech. As the plot progressed, Columbina was able to connect more with other characters, so Lynn adjusted her acting skills, speeding up her speech and adding more intonation accordingly.

== Appearances ==
Columbina was originally worshipped as the moon goddess Kuutar by the Frostmoon Scions, a tribe living in Nod-Krai, a region of the fictional nation of Snezhnaya. Disillusioned by her followers' constant demands, she abandoned them and joined the Fatui, a powerful organization based in Snezhnaya, becoming one of its high-ranking Harbingers under the codename "Damselette", and receiving the codename "Columbina" from the Tsaritsa of Snezhnaya. However, she soon realized that the Fatui merely coveted her powers as a deity, prompting her to flee back to the Frostmoon Scions and go into hiding. In response to this, the Tsaritsa issued a warrant for Columbina's arrest.

In the main storyline, the Traveler meets Columbina at her hiding place in Nod-Krai. Columbina is initially distrustful towards them, but she gradually overcomes this and reveals that she has long felt alienated from the world of Teyvat (the planet on which the game takes place) because its ruling divine authority, the Heavenly Principles, rejected the ancient moon goddesses. When a supernatural threat known as the Wild Hunt endangers Nod-Krai, she and the Traveler join forces to defeat the threat. Although victorious, Columbina is severely weakened from the battle and nearly disappears before being rescued by her friends, including fellow Fatui Harbingers Sandrone and Arlecchino.

She subsequently prepares to return to the moon, but is deceived by the Fatui Harbinger Il Dottore, who seeks to steal her divine powers and ascend to godhood himself. To protect her friends, Columbina escapes into the moon's reflection, a mysterious realm where time flows backward. While exploring the realm, she discovers it is actually a prison where Teyvat's three original moon goddesses are located. After obtaining the three original moon goddesses' powers, Columbina devises a plan to escape the prison by scattering her body across Nod-Krai, creating a primordial form of energy called kuuvahki which powers Nod-Krai and leaving her soul behind. She also creates a familiar called Luonnotar from part of her soul to serve as a connection to the outside world. With Luonnotar's help, the Traveler and friends eventually help reunite Columbina's body, soul and powers, restoring her as a complete moon goddess. Together, they defeat Il Dottore, after which Columbina is no longer rejected by Teyvat. Having developed a sense of belonging through her experiences, Columbina abandons her desire to return to the moon and accepts Nod-Krai as her home.

=== Gameplay ===
Columbina is a five-star Hydro character who wields a catalyst in combat. When included in a party, she converts certain elemental reactions into "Lunar Reactions", a mechanic specific to characters from Nod-Krai, whose damage can be increased through her Elemental Burst ability. She can also revive dead party members while exploring Nod-Krai.

== Promotion and release ==
Columbina made her first appearance as part of a trailer in which the Fatui Harbingers are presented, called "A Winter Night's Lazzo", which was released in August 2022. In it, the Fatui Harbingers gather to mourn the departure of one of their colleagues, La Signora; Columbina knelt beside the latter's coffin and sang a bittersweet song. On July 22, 2025, miHoYo released a story trailer called "Moonlit Ballad of the Night", hinting that Columbina would appear in the "Song of the Welkin Moon" story arc. Subsequently, Columbina appeared as a non-player character in version "Luna I" of the game in September. (Note: The last version before version "Luna I" was version 5.8 "Luna IX", so version "Luna I" was referred to by some as 6.0, "Luna II" as 6.1 and so on.) In version "Luna II", released in October, players could interact with Columbina in an area known as Silvermoon Hall, and they would receive various requests from her. If all those requests were fulfilled, they could obtain a buff unique to Nod-Krai.

On December 10 of the same year, miHoYo released character art for Columbina. On January 7, 2026, miHoYo released a character teaser called "Where She Dwells". On January 12, 2026, miHoYo released another promotional video for Columbina called "To Where She Flies", in which she is shown walking among lifelike dolls whose movements appear to tell her life story. Columbina was added as a playable character on January 13, 2026, with the release of version "Luna IV" of the game; her signature weapon "Nocturne's Curtain Call" was also released then. In addition, miHoYo released a theme song for her entitled "Beyond the Full Moon's Shadow" sung by Lynn. In an interview, Lynn described it as a "tear-jerking ballad" and said the lyrics would resonate with players who had experienced the storyline and make them feel more sorry for Columbina. Lynn said that because Columbina's voice is very different from her own, it was challenging to sing as Columbina, but she still tried her best to express the emotion in the song, which she described as cute and fragile.

== Reception ==
Following the release of the story teaser "A Winter Night's Lazzo", players expressed considerable anticipation for the Fatui Harbingers featured therein, including Columbina. Fans also expressed their enthusiasm for Columbina through cosplay, while official artwork of the character attracted attention and discussion. Following her playable debut, Genshin Impact ranked eighth on Lenovo's PC game popularity chart for January 2026. At a festival in Shanghai that month organized by miHoYo, the company displayed a 6.5-meter (21 ft)-tall statue of Columbina, which became one of the event's most popular photo spots.

The media gave positive reactions to Columbina's image. Pocket Tactics commentator Tilly Lawton indicated that in "A Winter Night's Lazzo" Columbina bent over and sang the melody of the battle theme of Signora, one of the game's bosses and her fellow Fatui Harbinger who was killed, while leaning over the latter's coffin. Lawton described Columbina's voice as "somewhat menacing" and her smile as unsettling, and also described her as unhinged. She also highlighted the contrast between Columbina's lace-covered eyes and innocent appearance and her high-ranking position among the Fatui Harbingers. INSIDE editor Tea Pudding praised "To Where She Flies" for its presentation, characterizing it as ballet-like and graceful. Lee Hyuk-jin of GameFocus described her as a goddess whose characterization had been carefully developed throughout the first half of the "Song of the Welkin Moon" story arc, arguing that she was effectively a co-main protagonist alongside the Traveler. One writer from Chinese gaming outlet Game Grape observed that Genshin Impact provided Columbina with a dedicated area on the map and interactive story sequences, allowing players to converse and take walks with her to increase their bond. The reviewer argued that these features departed from Genshin Impact's established narrative structure and enhanced players' immersion.

Writers Willow and Stephen of Nadianshi considered Columbina a very successful character developed via the game's long-term content strategy. The two writers divided Columbina's development into three stages. Upon her first encounter with the Traveler, she displays a guarded, emotionally reserved demeanor, habitually describing relationships in terms of "transactions" and appearing cold and distant. As players become more familiar with her, however, they discover that she is not devoid of emotions. They argue that her tendency to secretly eat the offerings left to her and steal glances at food reveals a more human side to her personality. By the final stage, she has developed a full range of emotions, and is more open. They write that by then, she came to regard fighting alongside others as an expression of affection rather than an obligation that needs to be repaid. They further argued that the Luna IV storyline revisits earlier plot developments via time travel, giving new significance to players' previous experiences. This makes their longing for Columbina feel as if it had become part of the narrative itself, deepening their connection with her. Meanwhile, Nod-Krai's "Selenic Chronicles" reputation system integrates glimpses of Columbina's everyday life into world exploration and interactive activities, making her characterization feel more natural. They also praised Columbina's promotional material and attributed Columbina's commercial success not only to her individual characterization but also to the game's ability to resolve long-running narrative foreshadowing. The Luna IV story arc, they wrote, converged on the central events of rescuing Columbina and defeating Il Dottore, after bringing together plot threads spanning other nations throughout Teyvat. Screen Rant commentator Bruno Yonezawa characterized Columbina as the de facto ruler of Nod-Krai and compared her status there to that of Mavuika in Natlan.

In terms of gameplay design, Yonezawa believes that Columbina is the core character of the game's Lunar Reaction mechanism, which was introduced for Nod-Krai characters. Not only can she trigger Lunar Reactions herself, but also enhance the damage caused by existing ones. PCGamesN commentator Christian Vaz praised Columbina's unique walking animation and abilities in combat, and mentioned that the player community jokingly calls her the game's first "6-star character". (Note: In Genshin Impact's gacha system, the highest rank for a character is 5 stars, followed by 4 stars. A "6-star character" refers to a character whose performance surpasses that of most 5-star characters.) Lee praised her as an "almost perfect character" in regards to her combat abilities. In addition to praising her use of Lunar Reactions, he also indicated that the development team not only pursued damage output in the design of her combat abilities, but also put effort into what he called "convenience".
