= Osetinsky =

Osetinsky (Russian: Осетинский; masculine) or Osetinskaya (Осетинская; feminine) is a Russian surname literally meaning "from/related to Ossetia". People with the last name include:

- Oleg Osetinsky (1937-2020), Soviet-Russian screenwriter and documentary film director
- Polina Osetinskaya (born 1975), Russian pianist
- Yelizaveta Osetinskaya (born 1977), Russian journalist
