= Erin Yvette =

American voice actress

- Yvette at Dragon Con in 2026
- Other name: Erin Ashe
- Education: New York University; Santa Rosa Junior College; University of California, Berkeley (BA)
- Occupation: Voice Actress
- Years active: 2010–present
- Agent: Dean Panaro Talent
- Spouse: Nicholas Herman (m. 2019)

Erin Yvette is an American voice actress best known for her roles in character driven, narrative-heavy video games, like Snow White in The Wolf Among Us by Telltale Games, Alex in Night School Studio's debut Oxenfree, Chelsea Stevens in Campo Santo's debut Firewatch, Dora and Scylla in Supergiant’s Hades 2, and Blonde Blazer in AdHoc Studio's first title Dispatch. She has voiced new champions and skins in games like Fortnite, Paladins, Smite and Vainglory. She has also voiced characters for other Telltale games, including Molly and Bonnie in The Walking Dead, Sasha in Tales from the Borderlands, various voices in Minecraft: Story Mode, Vicki Vale in Batman: The Telltale Series, Cissia in Zenless Zone Zero, and Arlecchino in Genshin Impact, as well as the announcer in 2XKO. She is also the voice for Samus Aran in Metroid Prime 4: Beyond, replacing Jennifer Hale in the Metroid Prime series.

Outside of video games, she can be heard singing for children's toys and animations and speaking in various car, fashion, and tech commercials.

== Filmography ==
=== Live-action ===
Year	Title	Role	Notes	Source
2017	Level Up Norge	Alex	Voice, uncredited	
2018	My Ex-Girlfriend Is a Shovel	Coral		
2018	Crazy Car	Katelyn		
2019	Bonfire of Destiny (Le Bazar de la Charité)	Adrienne de Lenverpré	English dub	
2019	The App	Matilde	English dub	
2019	Vida Perfecta	Maria, Additional Voices	English dub	
2020	Dad Wanted	Fernanda	English dub	

=== Animation ===
Year	Title	Role	Notes	Source
2018	Archie - The New Riverdale	Veronica Lodge	Spotify Studios	
2018	Minecraft: Story Mode	Mabel / Farmer Gloria / Griefer	Netflix	
2021	The Casagrandes	Phoebe Powers, Various	Nickelodeon	
2023	Not Quite Narwhal	Mom Tuskington		
2024	Secret Level	The Voice	Voice, episode: "Armored Core: Asset Management"	

=== Anime ===
Year	Title	Role	Notes	Source
2019	Millennium Actress	Chiyoko Fujikawa (Adult)	US English dub of 2001 anime	
2021	My Next Life as a Villainess: All Routes Lead to Doom! X	Susanna Randall	English dub	
2022	Love of Kill	Chateau Dankworth	English dub	
2022	Bastard!! Heavy Metal, Dark Fantasy	Tia Noto Yoko	English dub	
2022	In the Land of Leadale	Caerina	English dub	
2022	Science Fell in Love, So I Tried to Prove It	Haru	English dub	
2023	Digimon Adventure:	Gatomon, Angewomon, Magnadramon, Ophanimon	English dub	
2023	Good Night World	May/Sayaka Arima	English dub	
2024	T・P Bon	Yoko Shiraki	English dub	
2025	Scarlet	Scarlet	English dub	
2026	Black Torch	Ichika Kishimojin	English dub	

=== Video games ===
Year	Title	Role	Notes	Source
2012	The Walking Dead	Sandra, Molly, Bonnie	Credited as Erin Ashe	
2013	The Wolf Among Us	Snow White		
2013	The Walking Dead: 400 Days	Bonnie		
2013	The Walking Dead: Season Two	Bonnie, Sandra		
2014	Vainglory	Lyra		
2014	Tales from the Borderlands	Sasha, Hyperion Announcer, Atlas System Voice, Additional Voices		
2014	Game of Thrones	Additional Voices	Uncredited	
2015	Minecraft: Story Mode	Announcer, Mabel, Farmer Gloria, Griefer		
2015	Juice Jam	Various		
2016	Oxenfree	Alex		
2016	Firewatch	Chelsea Stevens, Teen #1		
2016	Atlas Reactor	Khita		
2016	Kelvin and the Infamous Time Machine	Lise & Angelica		
2016	Batman: The Telltale Series	Vicki Vale / Lady Arkham, Rhonda		
2016	2064: Read Only Memories	TOMCAT		
2017	Guardians of the Galaxy: The Telltale Series	Vylly, Alien #1, Nova Corp #3, Jerris		
2017	The Sims 4	Various	Trailer Content	
2017	League of War VR Arena	Livingstone & Jhenni		
2018	Fortnite	Lynx		
2018	Vainglory	Inara		
2018	Identity V	Gardener / Emma Woods		
2018	Phantom Doctrine	Voice		
2019	Afterparty	Sister Mary Wormhorn		
2019	Smite	Luminous Bastet, Sol Death Wraithe, Medusa Tormented Soul, Awilix GPS Announcer		
2019	Vindictus	Eira	English Dub	
2019	RAD	Player (Female)		
2019	Paladins	Io, Mermaid Ying		
2019	Final Fantasy Brave Exvius: War of the Visions	Deah		
2019	Magic: The Gathering Arena	Elspeth		
2020	Clubhouse Games: 51 Worldwide Classics	Boy (Tutorial Family)		
2020	Magic: The Gathering Arena	Elspeth		
2020	Wasteland 3	Various		
2020	Legends of Runeterra	Flower Child		
2020	Helheim Hassle	Stonie / Boarista / Bastet		
2020	Final Fantasy: Crystal Chronicles Remastered	Bel Dat		
2020	Hyrule Warriors: Age of Calamity	Great Fairy Cotera		
2020	Spider-Man: Miles Morales	The Underground / Additional Voices		
2020	Transformers: Battlegrounds	Slipstream / Scout Female 1 / Brawler Female 2		
2020	Rogue Company	Phantom (North Star)		
2020	Ninjala	Female Voice 2		
2021	The Elder Scrolls Online: Blackwood	Mirri Elendis		
2021	Neo: The World Ends with You	Ayano Kamachi		
2021	Shin Megami Tensei V	Sophia		
2021	Lost Judgment	Keiko		
2021	New World	Antiquarian Pajitnova / Herbalist Langlais / Justiciar Farrell		
2021	Psychonauts 2	HQ Maintenance Bobbie / Egg / Skate Germ / Additional Voices		
2021	Super Mecha Champions	Vita		
2021	Nier Reincarnation	Dark Mama		
2021	Shadowverse	Ralmia Sonic Racer / Sol Sister / Jackshovel Gravedigger		
2022	Crowns and Pawns: Kingdom of Deceit	Milda		
2022	Relayer	Additional Voices, English		
2022	Cosmonious High	Zanesha / Detective Z		
2022	Horizon Forbidden West	Shael / Lokattok / Additional Voices		
2022	Lost Ark	Vykas / Additional Voices, English		
2022	Genshin Impact	Arlecchino "The Knave"		
2022	Fire Emblem Heroes	Ymir: Life-Mother		
2022	God of War Ragnarök			
2022	Tactics Ogre: Reborn	Iuria Wolph		
2022	Tower of Fantasy	Lin		
2022	Path to Nowhere	Nightingale, Summer		
2023	Loop8: Summer of Gods	Michiko "Micchi" Hiume		
2023	Red Matter 2	Beta		
2023	Armored Core VI: Fires of Rubicon	Ayre		
2024	Unicorn Overlord	Selvie		
2024	Shin Megami Tensei V: Vengeance	Yoko Hiromine, Sophia		
2024	Genshin Impact	Arlecchino	English Dub	
2024	Farmagia	L'Oreille, Renmerelda, Lucy, Soleil, additional voices		
2024	Final Fantasy VII Rebirth	Esther	English Dub	
2025	MultiVersus	Lola Bunny		
2025	Cookie Run: Kingdom	Agar Agar Cookie, Glinda Cookie	English Dub	
2025	Xenoblade Chronicles X: Definitive Edition	Neilnail		
2025	Rune Factory: Guardians of Azuma	Tsubame, The Elder		
2025	Towa and the Guardians of the Sacred Tree	Chishitsu, Shiden, Tsuka, Uya		
2025	Hades II	Dora, Scylla		
2025	Digimon Story: Time Stranger	Additional voices		
2025	Dispatch	Blonde Blazer / Mandy		
2025	Guilty Gear Strive	Unika	English Dub	
2025	2XKO	Announcer		
2025	Metroid Prime 4: Beyond	Samus Aran		
2026	Goddess of Victory: Nikke	E.H. / Elysion Harper, Freesia / Pretty	English Dub	
2026	Code Vein II	Protagonist		
2026	Zenless Zone Zero	Cissia	English Dub	
2026	Fire Emblem: Fortune's Weave	Orchel	English Dub	
2026	Ledgerbound	The Queen	English Dub	
TBA	The Wolf Among Us 2	Snow White		

== Awards and nominations ==
Year	Award	Category	Nominated work	Result	Source
2015	BTVA Voice Acting Award	Breakthrough Voice Actor of the Year		Nominated	
2015	BTVA Video Game Voice Acting Award	Best Female Lead Vocal Performance in a Video Game	The Wolf Among Us	Nominated	
2015	BTVA Video Game Voice Acting Award	Best Vocal Ensemble in a Video Game	The Wolf Among Us	Nominated	
2015	BTVA Video Game Voice Acting Award	Best Vocal Ensemble in a Video Game	The Walking Dead: Season Two	Nominated	
2016	NAVGTR Award	Performance in a Comedy, Supporting	Tales from the Borderlands	Won	
2016	BTVA Video Game Voice Acting Award	Best Vocal Ensemble in a Video Game	Tales from the Borderlands	Nominated	
2017	BTVA Video Game Voice Acting Award	Best Female Vocal Performance in a Video Game in a Supporting Role	Batman: The Telltale Series	Nominated	
2017	BTVA Video Game Voice Acting Award	Best Vocal Ensemble in a Video Game	Batman: The Telltale Series	Nominated	
