= Nod-Krai =

Fictional autonomous region in Genshin Impact

- Genshin Impact location
- Nasha Town
- Created by: miHoYo
- Based on: Baltic region and Scandinavia

In-universe information
- Type: Autonomous region of Snezhnaya
- Ruled by: Voynich Guild (de facto)
- Location: West edge of Teyvat, southwest of Snezhnaya
- Characters: List

Nod-Krai (Chinese: 挪德卡莱; pinyin: Nuódé Kǎlái) is a fictional region in the video game Genshin Impact published by miHoYo. It is the seventh region to be added to the game, and was released with version 6.0 (titled "version Luna I") on September 10, 2025. It is the main setting for the "Song of the Welkin Moon" quest series. In the game, Nod-Krai is considered an autonomous region of Snezhnaya, and is located to the northwest of Natlan and south of mainland Snezhnaya. The geography and culture of Nod-Krai combine the landscapes of Northern Europe and the Baltic region, but is not based on a single clear real-world area; according to developers, Nod-Krai's overall design and narrative is shaped by interactions between various characters and factions.

Several gaming outlets described Nod-Krai as a transitional arc leading into Snezhnaya, noting its use of multiple factions to connect earlier plot threads. Nod-Krai boosted the game's revenue and player discussion, and it received praise for tying together long-running storylines and engaging players. However, Nod-Krai also received criticism for some of its character designs.

== Creation and design ==
Information about Nod-Krai was first released in March 2025. Nod-Krai serves as the primary setting of the "Song of the Welkin Moon" series of updates, beginning with version 6.0 of the game. This chapter connects narrative threads and character foreshadowing established in earlier versions, centering on Teyvat's three moons, two of which are in pieces. The development team stated that the goal of the Nod-Krai arc was to tie up loose ends in the game's plot, bringing previously underexplored information back into the broader narrative. Several project team members wanted to tie up loose ends before continuing to Snezhnaya. The moon is the central motif of Nod-Krai. Unlike earlier story arcs, the story of the Nod-Krai quest chapter is not driven by the concept of a single nation, but instead progresses through the shared objectives and goals of multiple groups of people. In terms of narrative design, the team conceived of Nod-Krai as a stage centered on "people", where groups of different backgrounds and personalities collectively drive the story forward.

=== Scenes and gameplay ===
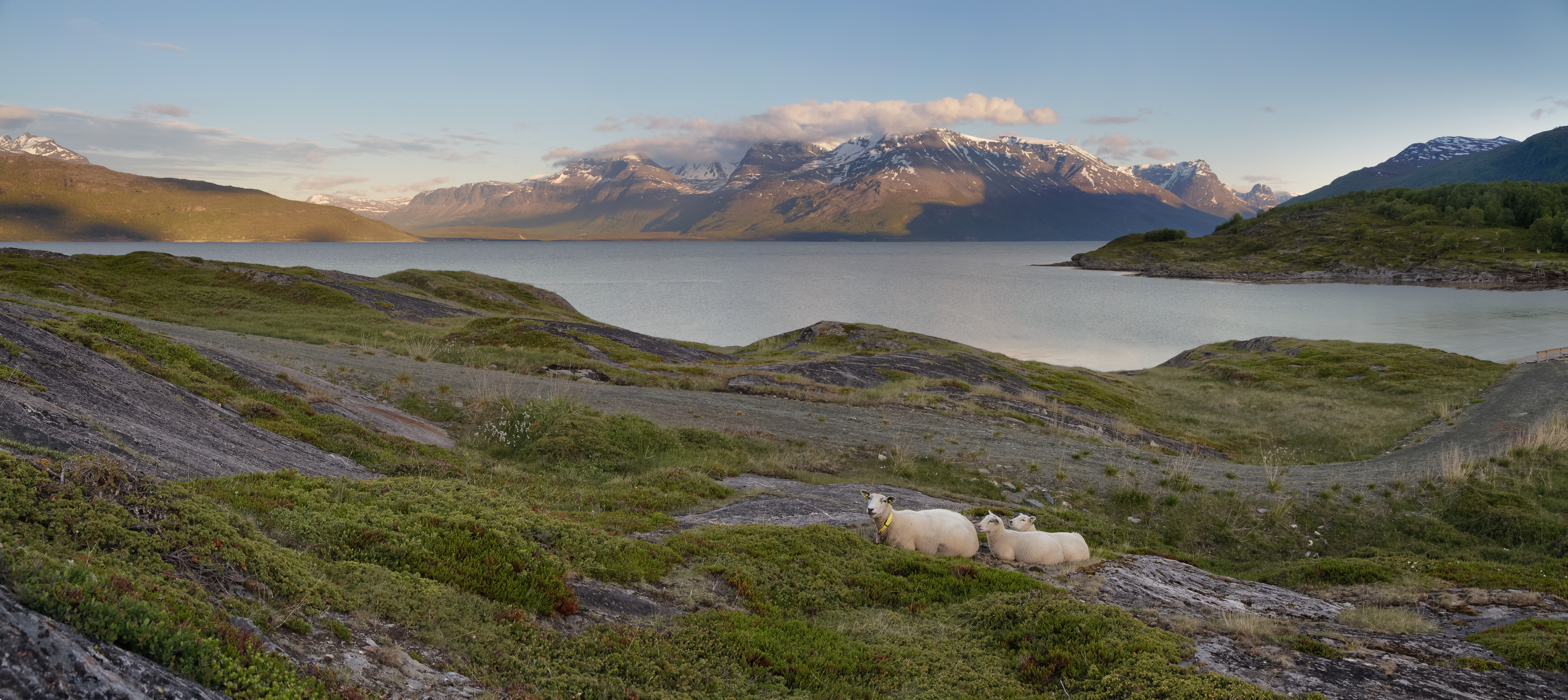
Nod-Krai is partly based on the fjords of Scandinavia, seen here.

Nod-Krai's landscape is partly based on fjord scenery with Nordic characteristics and the natural environments of the Baltic region, though its cultural setting does not correspond to any clear real-world counterpart. It is also inspired by Slavic and Scandinavian countries. The development team explained that, rather than centering on a single civilization, the region's overall design is instead shaped by the relationships between characters and factions. Nod-Krai's wilderness carries the atmosphere of a dark forest, while its urban areas exhibit a style similar to dieselpunk. Its art also deliberately emphasizes the contrast between natural landscapes and artificial, technological creations.

In version "Luna I" (6.0), a new feature called Meeting Points was introduced, allowing players to enter the everyday living spaces of certain characters from Nod-Krai. The development team wrote that the early stages of the "Song of the Welkin Moon" quest will rely on an expanded main storyline for character development, while integrating story quests and hangout events more naturally into the world. They also expressed the intent to transform certain plot elements, such as the conflict with the Wild Hunt and intelligence gathering at the Curatorium of Secrets, into playable experiences. During exploration, Lauma can transform into a centaur-like form during world exploration, while nearby wildlife will approach her and provide items or healing. Some non-player characters in Nod-Krai also perform unique greeting gestures toward her. Columbina has her own area in Nod-Krai called Silvermoon Hall, where she can ask the protagonist, the Traveler, to hum tunes, have conversations with her, or take a stroll under the moonlight in exchange for rewards.

In the early in-game history of Teyvat, three moons once existed, whose power was more primordial than the seven primordial elements upon which the world operates. A force related to these moons known as kuuvahki is an ancient energy spread throughout Nod-Krai, shaping its terrain and lifeforms. Certain characters can harness this power in combat through devices called Moon Wheels, triggering unique elemental reactions in combat known as Lunar Reactions. Nod-Krai characters also feature a system called Moonsign, which provides buffs depending on the number of Nod-Krai characters in the current party. Across Nod-Krai, monopolar fields affiliated with kuuvahki are common, and they can be used for puzzles and map traversal.

The Nod-Krai music was produced by HoYo-MiX and recorded by the London Symphony Orchestra, the London Voices choir, singer Aurora, and folk musicians.

== Setting ==
=== Geography ===
In the game, Nod-Krai is an autonomous region located northwest of Natlan and at the southernmost edge of Snezhnaya and lies on the edge of Teyvat. It is considered an autonomous region of Snezhnaya, and is ruled by the Voynich Guild, a group of local merchants. Situated on the fringes of Teyvat, it has long been influenced by multiple factions as well as the antagonistic power of the Abyss. It is said to be lawless in nature. Numerous groups from across Teyvat have gathered there, including the Knights of Favonius of Mondstadt. Another ongoing threat comes from the Abyss in the form of the Wild Hunt, which continually takes a toll on the land's vitality. In version "Luna I" of the game, the first part of Nod-Krai to be released consists of three insular regions, with the story beginning in Nasha Town. Although the town features mechanical-style streets, its overall appearance more closely resembles an industrial settlement pieced together from limited resources, reminding one author of 1990s-era art. Nasha Town is a chaotic melting pot, home to an independent organization known as the Curatorium of Secrets, which accepts commissions and handles matters that cannot be openly resolved. Further west is Hiisi Island, inhabited by the Frostmoon Scions, a group associated with ancient ruins and lunar traditions. The Lightkeepers, an ancient organization dedicated to safeguarding Nod-Krai's freedom and stability in the face of the Wild Hunt, are based at Paha Isle and Voidsea Outlook, and their members carry special lanterns that function as warning signs when the Wild Hunt is nearby. In version "Luna IV" and "Luna VII", Nod-Krai was expanded northwards and added to the launch pod that takes people to the Frost Moon.

=== Lore ===
Nod-Krai originated during Teyvat's primordial dragon era when part of one of the world's moons fell into the sea. This event infused the area with kuuvahki, a unique lunar energy that altered local flora and fauna over time. Six thousand years before the game's events, the ancient civilization of Hyperborea was destroyed by a divine Celestial Nail, coincidentally triggering a conflict known as the War of Funerary Flame, and two of Teyvat's moons were destroyed. Canon (also known as Huurrekuutar), the surviving goddess of the Frost Moon, led refugees to Hiisi Island in Nod-Krai, where they established the Frostmoon Scions. Following Huurrekuutar's death, the Scions maintained a practice of selective bloodline preservation to produce a host for her reincarnation. Five hundred years prior to the main narrative, the new Frost Moon goddess, Kuutar—later revealed as the Fatui Harbinger Columbina—was born among them.

Nod-Krai was one of the first regions corrupted by the Abyss around at the same time. Since then, it has been repeatedly invaded by the Wild Hunt, a force controlled by Rerir, one of the Five Sinners of Khaenri'ah, who uses its power to restore his strength and reconstruct his body. After receiving intelligence about Abyssal incursions, the Knights of Favonius of Mondstadt, led by Grand Master Varka, set out for Nod-Krai. Following their journey in Natlan, the Traveler, Paimon, and Ineffa, one of their friends, arrive in Nod-Krai, where they meet Lauma, leader of the Frostmoon Scions, and Flins, a Lightkeeper. Together, they begin resisting the Wild Hunt and uncover Rerir as the source of the threat. During the investigation, the Traveler discovers Columbina living in seclusion among the Frostmoon Scions, who view her as a moon goddess Kuutar. As other Fatui Harbingers search for her, Columbina then befriends the Traveler, and with Arlecchino's help, they expel Rerir from Teyvat. Columbina then attempts to return to the Frost Moon to restore her strength, but is stopped by Il Dottore, another Fatui Harbinger, who seizes the power of the three moons in an attempt to ascend to godhood. Columbina allows herself to be imprisoned in the moon's reflection to prevent him from fully controlling her power. The Traveler and allies conjoin the plans to revive Columbina and later confront Dottore. Meanwhile, Columbina travels back in time, receives divine power from the three ancient moon goddesses whom Columbina transports them back to the real world, closing the loop, and with help of the Traveler and their allies, returns to Teyvat to defeat him, bringing the Frost Moon back to Teyvat in process.

== Release and promotion ==
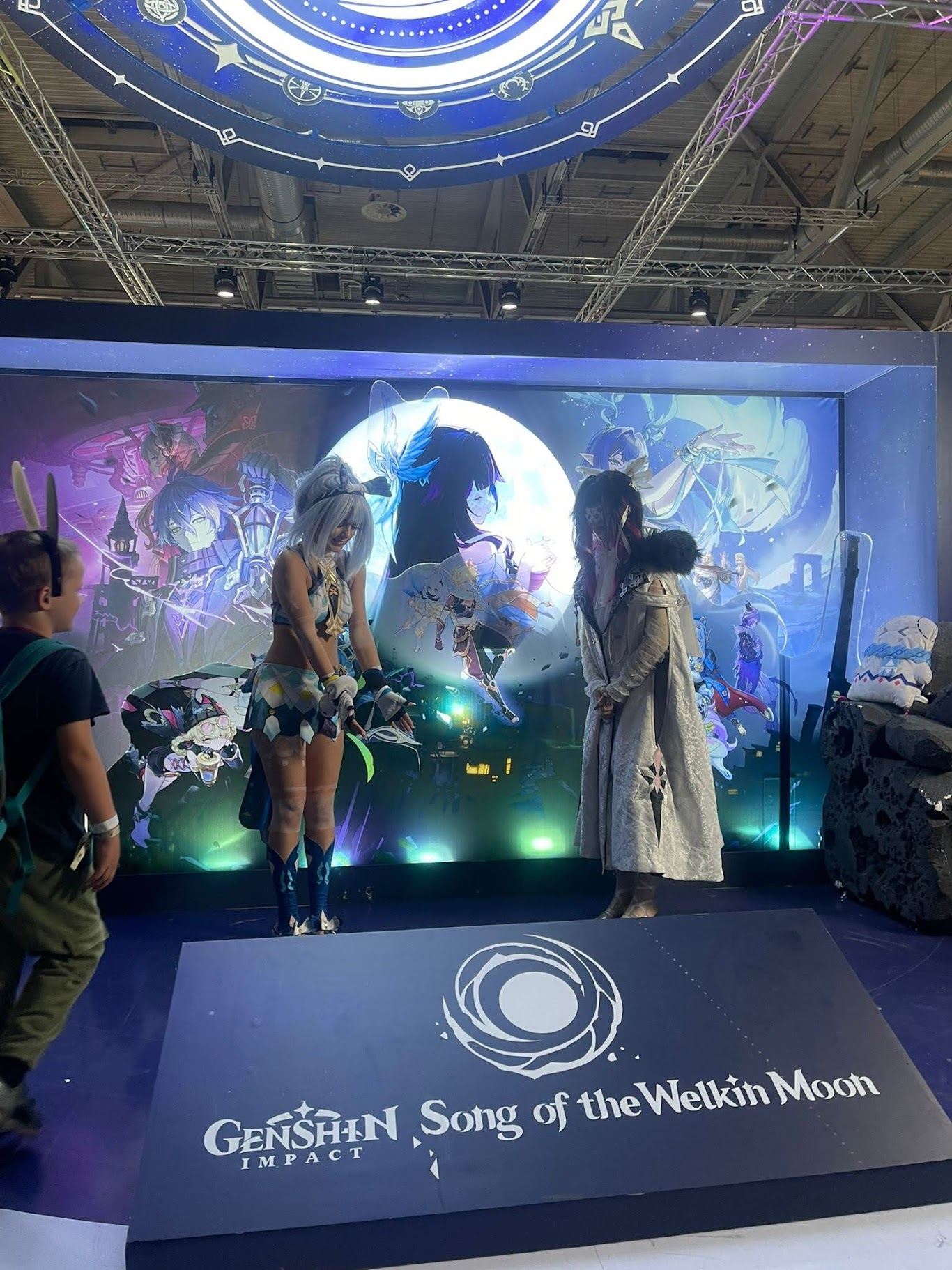
The Genshin Impact booth at Gamescom 2025, themed around Nod-Krai

A short film was released in July 2025 which showcased upcoming character and scene designs which would be used in Nod-Krai. Nod-Krai was released in Version "Luna I" of the game on September 10, 2025. Versions Luna II and III were released later that year, continuing the story. Version "Luna IV" featured the release of a new area of Nod-Krai and was released on January 13–14, 2026.

On March 10, 2025, Genshin Impact officially launched a promotional event for Nod-Krai, and players held discussions around the concept of a "moon goddess" and the three moons, with related hashtags trending across Chinese social media. An update to the web event on March 31 revealed the factions of Nod-Krai and new areas of the map. On April 30, miHoYo released a behind-the-scenes documentary which officially announced that the Nod-Krai chapter would begin after version 5.8 and last for roughly one year. The developers described Nod-Krai as a stage for reconnecting previously-existing plot threads and bringing together multiple factions across Teyvat. On July 22, they released a promotional short film for Nod-Krai which showcased the region's characters and design. It introduced eleven characters, all but one of which were new. According to GamesRadar+ editor Austin Wood, the most anticipated reveals were long-teased characters finally making their first full appearance, namely, Columbina, Varka, and Alice. Alice is the mother of Klee and leader of the Hexenzirkel, a powerful group of witches. She had previously only appeared vocally in limited-time events. Varka, meanwhile, had been mentioned as early as version 1.0. At Gamescom in 2025, miHoYo released another trailer revealing Flins, and hosted demos of the region via livestream.

After the release of the trailer, discussions related to Nod-Krai became popular on social media in China. VG247 reported that the game set up a themed demo area at Gamescom 2025, allowing attendees to experience the region firsthand. Likee and Genshin Impact announced a collaboration in September, inviting users to submit their cosplay and fan-created videos to the app through October 15. As part of the collaboration, the Fantasy Likee Fest was held on September 21, 2025, at the MTS Live Hall in Saint Petersburg, Russia. A television commercial starring Japanese actor Kento Kaku aired nationwide in Japan that month to commemorate the release of Nod-Krai. A festival called Genshin FES 2026 announced in 2025. It was held in January 2026 in Shanghai, drawing over 80,000 attendees. Large sections of the venue were dedicated to Nod-Krai exhibits and locations, and the creator marketplace featured 112 booths and over 160 participating creators. An open stage was also available for player performances, including singing and dancing. On January 2, 2026, HoYoverse president Liu Wei confirmed that a major Snezhnaya expansion is planned following Nod-Krai, and hinted at future opportunities for players to meet at a potential Genshin Impact theme park. During a gala in 2025, the game featured a themed performance set in Nod-Krai and Silvermoon Hall. The segment opened with a song called "Somnias a Luna" (performed in Chinese by Angela Zhang) and later transitioned into the game's fifth-anniversary theme, depicting the Traveler's journey.

INSIDE reviewer Tea Pudding wrote that players had generally expected the next major version after Natlan to focus on the main storyline of Snezhnaya, the last of Teyvat's seven major nations. The announcement of Nod-Krai overturned these expectations. The initial release of Nod-Krai did not follow the previously-established numbering system used by the game; players had assumed it would be called "version 6.0", but instead it was called "Luna I". miHoYo positioned it as the beginning of the "Song of the Welkin Moon" story arc. On August 6, 2025, they also announced the discontinuation of the PlayStation 4 version of the game, citing hardware limitations and performance constraints, and explicitly attributing the decision to the technical demands of the Nod-Krai expansion. At the same time, the minimum PC GPU requirements were raised (from GTX 1030 to GTX 1050) as was the minimum Android processor requirement (to Snapdragon 660).

== Reception ==
In terms of commercial performance, Genshin Impact rose from #60 to #1 on the Japanese App Store list of top-grossing games the day after Nod-Krai launched. In January 2026, during Zhihu's annual game character poll, Columbina won first place by a wide margin. Commentator Yuan Luwei remarked that the "Song of the Welkin Moon" quest series exceeded expectations and shocked the players. According to AppMagic estimates, version "Luna IV" generated over US$6,000,000 in net daily revenue after platform cuts, marking the highest single-day total in nearly six months. The game also ranked first on Japan's iOS top-grossing chart that day, third in the U.S. and fifth in China. AppMagic further estimated that Genshin Impact generated $43.5 million in net revenue in January 2026, a month-over-month increase of approximately 69%, ranking 14th globally among mobile games, up 13 positions from the previous month.

In March 2025, after HoYoverse revealed the factions of Nod-Krai, players began tagging creators known for analyzing the game's lore and asking them to interpret the relationships between these factions. Jinghe reviewer Qian Hongyan argued that Nod-Krai represents an attempt to move beyond its established nation-based structure and re-engage veteran players. Not being based on a specific real-world country or region was a challenge to the game's creative team. They hoped to transform Nod-Krai into a stage themed around individual people rather than nations, allowing groups from different pre-existing nations in Teyvat and with different personalities to better integrate into the story. Author Yang Liang of China's Do News praised this, writing that Teyvat was becoming more diverse because of the creative team's "continuous development of the local customs and culture". Following the release of the story trailer "Ballad of the Moonlit Night" on July 22, 2025, discussions about Nod-Krai's characters and narrative surged among players. Some felt the newly revealed characters exemplified the game's creative style, praising their designs as both lore-consistent and technically improved. Wood described the large cast as "massive". He emphasized the long-awaited full appearances of characters who had been hinted at for years as one of the most notable aspects of Nod-Krai, calling the density of the revelations foreshadowing. TheGamer editor Sanyam Jain argued that Nod-Krai is the first region in the main storyline primarily driven by a large number of characters not from the region itself, rather than mainly focusing on natives. He also said that the trailer sequentially introduced characters such as Varka, Hexenzirkel members Alice and Nicole, Fatui Harbingers Sandrone and Columbina, and the humanoid form of the dragon Durin, while touching on deeper lore concepts. The Times of India described Nod-Krai as a turning point in the game's narrative, suggesting its multi-faction structure would bring together previously-scattered storylines. Meanwhile, TheGamer editor Gabrielle Castania argued that, as a frontier region preceding Snezhnaya, Nod-Krai could serve as a key opportunity to draw returning players back to the game. She cited data from ActivePlayer showing that the game's monthly player count had been declining for over a year and a half prior to Nod-Krai, with only brief spikes after updates followed by rapid drop-offs. GAME Watch reviewer Sorisu similarly suggested that Nod-Krai could become a central stage for resolving long-running narrative threads.

After Nod-Krai launched in September 2025, Jinghe commentators Qian Hongyan and Zhang Longxi likewise argued that Nod-Krai functions to some extent as a version dedicated to organizing and resolving previously-scattered narrative threads. In a plot review, Qian said that with Columbina's full involvement in version "Luna IV", the Nod-Krai story arc ultimately formed a closed-loop narrative connecting several prior versions of the game. Castania called the characters "darkly intriguing". Sorisu disliked Nasha Town's appearance, saying it resembled a pile of junk.

Official artwork of Lauma. She is described as curvaceous, and shows a lot of skin. She can transform into a centaur when exploring. In this form, she can double-jump.

After the release of the character Lauma in September 2025, controversy arose within Chinese communities due to her design, which consists of a large amount of exposed skin when viewed from the side. Some players argued this conflicted with the game's 12+ age rating in China, with reports even being submitted to the Cyberspace Administration of China. Lauma is officially described as the Moonchanter (high priestess) of the Frostmoon Scions, with a design inspired by a Nordic fertility goddess. She was compared to classic Western fantasy character designs like elves and druids. Some players defended the design, arguing that the exposed elements were intentional to convey divine symbolism, and that adding more clothing would make her feel too generic. Amid ongoing debate, the App Store promotional image for Lauma was updated on September 12 to include floral elements covering exposed areas, while HoYoverse customer support stated that player feedback had been recorded. INSIDE commentator Tea Pudding said that Lauma's traditional clothing consists only of two pieces of cloth at the front and back, and a large area of bare skin can be seen from the side; however, her leader's temperament, composed demeanor, and antlers give her a more mysterious air rather than a purely sensual one. DBLTAP's Marco Wutz speculated that Lauma's ability to travel through the land quickly in deer form would be a travel mechanic unique to Nod-Krai, but this was not the case.

In previous years, HoYoverse had been the subject of controversy for a lack of ethnic representation in Natlan and Sumeru. Bruno Yonezawa of Screen Rant wrote that since Nod-Krai is based on Slavic and Scandinavian countries, that HoYoverse "may not bother to create" more characters with darker skin tones, writing that they had ignored fans' requests for more representation in Natlan and speculating that the likelihood of an increase in skin color diversity in future updates was low.
