= Lumine =

Lumine is an obsolete verb meaning "to illuminate". It may refer to:

- Lumines, a puzzle video game series
- Lumine, the main protagonist of the 2020 video game Genshin Impact
- Lumine, a Reploid character from Mega Man X8
