= Lynn (voice actress) =

Japanese voice actress

- りん
- Born: June 1 Yokosuka, Kanagawa Prefecture, Japan
- Occupation: Voice actress
- Years active: 2010–present
- Agent: Arts Vision
- Notable work: Genshin Impact as Columbina; Undefeated Bahamut Chronicle as Lisesharte Atismata; High School Fleet as Mashiro Munetani; Keijo as Nozomi Kaminashi; Fuuka as Fuuka Akitsuki; Just Because! as Ena Komiya; I Want to Eat Your Pancreas as Sakura Yamauchi; We Never Learn as Mafuyu Kirisu; Fire Force as Princess Hibana; Umamusume: Pretty Derby as Maruzensky; Mobile Suit Gundam: The Witch from Mercury as Miorine Rembran

Lynn (りん, Rin; born June 1) is a Japanese voice actress affiliated with Arts Vision. She is known primarily for her performances in anime. She voiced Columbina in Genshin Impact, Nozomi Kaminashi in Keijo, Fuuka Akitsuki in Fuuka, Ayano Yugiri in Engage Kiss, and Miorine Rembran in Mobile Suit Gundam: The Witch from Mercury.

== Biography ==
Lynn was born in Yokosuka to an American father and a Japanese mother. She became interested in acting while at nursery school. She had learned that her mother used to be part of bands, which influenced her interest in entertainment. Lynn watched Case Closed and Inuyasha while in elementary school. While in middle school, she became aware of the Japan Narration Acting Institute. She later attended the school after asking permission from her parents. She worked at the institute in her first year of high school. While visiting Niigata Prefecture at that time, she would take the Shinkansen to Tokyo every Sunday for lessons. While attending high school, she became a manager of the school's basketball club. In her third year, she performed at the school's cultural festival. The positive reception she received for her performance inspired her to continue her pursuit. She continued her studies at the training school, while starting her voice acting roles. She initially voiced roles in Japanese dubs of foreign media, while voicing background characters in anime. Her first main role was Maya Kyōdō in the anime series Sabagebu!. She voiced Lisesharte Atismata in Undefeated Bahamut Chronicle, Mashiro Munetani in High School Fleet, Nozomi Kaminashi in Keijo, Fuuka Akitsuki in Fuuka, Himari Takanashi in Interviews with Monster Girls, Mizuki Fudō in Idol Incidents, Mano Rinoda in Schoolgirl Strikers, Ena Komiya in Just Because!, Song Minhua in Girly Air Force, and Mafuyu Kirisu in We Never Learn. She also performed two insert songs for the Fuuka anime series.

Lynn enjoys betting on horse racing and won at the 99th Prix de l'Arc de Triomphe at Longchamp Racecourse in Paris, France on October 4, 2020, with a trifecta ticket of odds of 1010.8 times. On April 4, 2021, she won at the 65th Osaka Cup at Hanshin Racecourse with a trifecta ticket at odds of 1062.1, for a payout of over one million yen.

On July 29, 2022, while appearing on a live-streaming program for Engage Kiss, Lynn received the results of a PCR test taken a few days prior, confirming she was positive for COVID-19. She left the broadcast after taking an antigen test for a negative result.

== Filmography ==
=== Anime series ===
Year	Title	Role	Notes
2012	Bakuman	Assistant	
2012	Magi: The Labyrinth of Magic	Aero	Episode 4
2012	Naruto Shippuden	Academy Student	Episode 277
2012	The Pet Girl of Sakurasou	Training School Teacher	Episode 6
2013	Gingitsune	Morita	
2013	Oreshura	Female student A (ep 1), Girlfriend (ep 4)	
2013	Robotics;Notes	Female Reporter	Episode 18
2013	Sasami-san@Ganbaranai	Classmate C	Episode 10
2013	Unlimited Psychic Squad	Ikuo	Episode 5
2014	Love Live! School Idol Project	Classmate	Episode 9
2014	Magic Kaito		Episode 9
2014	Monthly Girls' Nozaki-kun	Female Student (ep 1), Heroine (ep 5), Ran (ep 10)	
2014	Recently, My Sister Is Unusual	Tennis Club captain, Yūya Kanzaki (child)	
2014	Riddle Story of Devil	Female Instructor B (ep 1), Female student (ep 4)	
2014	Sabagebu!	Maya Kyōdō	
2014	The Irregular at Magic High School	Announcer	
2014	Yowamushi Pedal	Kana	Episodes 9 and 10
2014	Babygamba	Shioji	
2015	Comet Lucifer	Sōgo Amagi (child)	
2015	Death Parade	Shigeru Miura (young)	
2015	Funassyi no Funafunafuna Biyori	Guressyi	
2015	Gate	Myuute Luna Sires (eps 11-12), Wagon girl (eps 3-4), Announcer, Clerk, Dora	
2015	Ghost in the Shell: Arise	Girl	Episode 6
2015	Lance N' Masques	Silvia Marlowe	
2015	Mobile Suit Gundam: Iron-Blooded Orphans	Masahiro Altland (child)	
2015	Plastic Memories	Riho Saito	Episode 8
2015	Rampo Kitan: Game of Laplace	Nurse	Episode 3
2015	The Heroic Legend of Arslan	Court Lady	Episode 15
2015	Unlimited Fafnir	Operator A, Female Student	
2015	Young Black Jack	Tiara	Episodes 7 and 8
2016	Bungo Stray Dogs	Atsushi Nakajima (child)	
2016	Dimension W	Atsuko Hirose	Episode 6
2016	Gate 2nd Season	Knight, Female knight, Myuute	
2016	Heavy Object	Operator	Episode 19
2016	High School Fleet	Mashiro Munetani	
2016	Keijo	Nozomi Kaminashi	
2016	Kuromukuro	Rita	
2016	Lostorage incited WIXOSS	Female Selector	Episode 7
2016	Norn9	Classmate 1	Episode 3
2016	Prince of Stride: Alternative	Child	Episodes 9 and 10
2016	Snow White with the Red Hair	Kidou	Episode 21
2016	The Disastrous Life of Saiki K.	Female Student A (ep 8), Yoriko Itano (ep 10)	
2016	The Lost Village	Pii-tan, Soy Latte	
2016	Twin Star Exorcists	Sakura Sada	
2016	Undefeated Bahamut Chronicle	Lisesharte Atismata	
2016	Working!!	Daichi Saitō (young)	
2017	Classroom of the Elite	Maya Sato	
2017	ēlDLIVE	Ninotchka	
2017	Fuuka	Fuuka Akitsuki	
2017	Idol Incidents	Mizuki Fudō	
2017	Interviews with Monster Girls	Himari Takanashi	
2017	Just Because!	Ena Komiya	
2017	Rin-ne	Hospital Girl Ghost	Episode 58
2017	Schoolgirl Strikers: Animation Channel	Mano Rinoda	
2018	Angolmois: Record of Mongol Invasion	Teruhi	
2018	A Place Further than the Universe	Yumiko Samejima	
2018	Magical Girl Site	Asahi Takiguchi	
2018	Märchen Mädchen	Yumilia Qazan	
2018	Ms. Vampire Who Lives in My Neighborhood	Hinata Natsuki	
2018	Ongaku Shōjo	Kotoko Kintoki	
2018	The Girl in Twilight	Yū Tōnaka	
2018	The Seven Heavenly Virtues	Raphael	
2019	Do You Love Your Mom and Her Two-Hit Multi-Target Attacks?	Medhi	
2019	Dr. Stone	Lillian Weinberg	
2019	Fire Force	Princess Hibana	
2019	Girly Air Force	Song Minhua	
2019	Kandagawa Jet Girls	Jennifer Peach	
2019	Manaria Friends	Poppy	
2019	The Morose Mononokean	Egen	
2019	The Promised Neverland	Gilda	
2019	Wataten!	Kōko Matsumoto	
2019	We Never Learn	Mafuyu Kirisu	
2020	Asteroid in Love	Yuki Endō	
2020	Show by Rock!! Mashumairesh!!	Rararin	
2020	Super HxEros	Shiko Murasame	
2020	Wandering Witch: The Journey of Elaina	Mirarosé	
2020	Sword Art Online: Alicization	Scheta	
2021	Cells at Work! Code Black	White Blood Cell (Neutrophilic)	
2021	Mushoku Tensei	Lillia Greyrat	
2021	Muv-Luv Alternative	Mikoto Yoroi	
2021	Night Head 2041	Reika Mutō	
2021	Re-Main	Chinu Kawakubo	
2021	Show by Rock!! Stars!!	Rararin	
2021	That Time I Got Reincarnated as a Slime	Luminus Valentine	
2021	The Aquatope on White Sand	Karin Kudaka	
2021	The Honor Student at Magic High School	Airi Isshiki	
2021	Tropical-Rouge! Pretty Cure	Eiko Mizushima	
2021	Tsukimichi: Moonlit Fantasy	Aqua	
2022	Aru Asa Dummy Head Mike ni Natteita Ore-kun no Jinsei	Tsurugi Kanegafuchi	
2022	Engage Kiss	Ayano Yugiri	
2022	Fanfare of Adolescence	Tako Kitami	
2022	Luminous Witches	Kawaguchi Fumiyo	
2022	Mobile Suit Gundam: The Witch from Mercury	Miorine Rembran	
2022	My Master Has No Tail	Shirara Tsubaki	
2023	Blue Orchestra	Shizuka Tachibana	
2023	Farming Life in Another World	Ria	
2023	I'm Giving the Disgraced Noble Lady I Rescued a Crash Course in Naughtiness	Erūka Crawford	
2023	Insomniacs After School	Motoko Kanikawa	
2023	My Daughter Left the Nest and Returned an S-Rank Adventurer	Yūri	
2023	Oshi no Ko	Miyako Saitō	
2023	The Fruit of Evolution	Beatrice Roegner	
2024	Haigakura	Hakushurin	
2024	I Was Reincarnated as the 7th Prince so I Can Take My Time Perfecting My Magical Ability	Sylpha	
2024	Meiji Gekken: 1874	Senri Kuroki	
2024	Murder Mystery of the Dead	Ranna Kuze	
2024	My Instant Death Ability Is So Overpowered	Asaka Takatō	
2024	Spice and Wolf: Merchant Meets the Wise Wolf	Elsa	
2024	The New Gate	Rionne Strail Bayreuth	
2024	Why Does Nobody Remember Me in This World?	Farin	
2024	Wistoria: Wand and Sword	Liana Owenzaus	
2024	You Are Ms. Servant	Grace	
2025	The Apothecary Diaries	Ayla	
2025	Bad Girl	Kiyoraka Sumiki	
2025	Bogus Skill "Fruitmaster"	Lena	
2025	My Awkward Senpai	Azusa Kannawa	
2025	Ninja vs. Gokudo	Prima	
2025	The 100 Girlfriends Who Really, Really, Really, Really, Really Love You	Mimimi Utsukushisugi	Season 2 onwards
2025	Trillion Game	Akari Shirotora	
2025	Umamusume: Cinderella Gray	Maruzensky	
2026	Drops of God	Sara	
2026	Fate/strange Fake	False Assassin	
2026	Firefly Wedding	Satoko Kirigaya	
2026	Full Clearing Another World Under a Goddess with Zero Believers	Nina	
2026	I'm Looking for Zombies	Natsuki	
2026	The Villager of Level 999	Paruna	
2026	Yoroi-Shinden Samurai Troopers	Mirei Aragaki	
2027	Mistress Kanan Is Devilishly Easy	Koko Kyōgi	
TBA	Millennium Family	Eve	

=== Original video animation ===
Year	Title	Role	Notes
2013	Ghost in the Shell: Arise	Operator B	Episode 2
2015	Aria		
2015	Hero Company	Saki Tsurugi/Langue de Chat White	
2015	Wakaba Girl	Female Customer A	
2016	Charlotte	Honoka	
2017	High School Fleet	Mashiro Munetani	

=== Original net animation ===
Year	Title	Role	Notes
2015	Monster Strike	Aoi Mizusawa	
2015	Ninja Slayer	Bunako (ep 3); Child (ep 16); Electronic voice (ep 6); Oiran (ep 1); Oiran B (ep 24)	
2016	Tawawa on Monday	Female employee	Episode 6
2020	Pokémon: Twilight Wings	Sonia	Episode 2
2021	Beyblade Burst Dynamite Battle	Ilya Mao	Episode 19
2021	Star Wars: Visions	Misa	Episode: "Akakiri"
2022	JoJo's Bizarre Adventure: Stone Ocean	Perla Pucci	Episode 31
2022	Kotaro Lives Alone	Akane Nitta	
2026	Yu-Gi-Oh! Card Game The Chronicles	Schietta	

=== Anime films ===
Year	Title	Role
2013	Persona 3 The Movie: No. 1, Spring of Birth	Gangster D
2014	Stand by Me Doraemon	
2015	Tamayura: Sotsugyō Shashin	
2015	Typhoon Noruda	Kenta Saijō (7 years old), Momoi
2016	Monster Strike The Movie	Aoi Mizusawa
2017	Mary and the Witch's Flower	Gib
2018	I Want to Eat Your Pancreas	Sakura Yamauchi
2020	High School Fleet: The Movie	Mashiro Munetani
2020	Josee, the Tiger and the Fish	Kana Kishimoto
2022	Wataten!: An Angel Flew Down to Me: Precious Friends	Koko Matsumoto
2023	Fate/strange Fake: Whispers of Dawn	Assassin
2025	Demon Slayer: Kimetsu no Yaiba – The Movie: Infinity Castle	Koyuki

=== Drama CDs ===
- Sukina Hito Hodo, Mugita
- Sennen Sensou Aigis Gekka no Hanayome, Katy
- The Ancient Magus' Bride, Fairy
- Tearmoon Empire, Esmeralda Etoile Greenmoon

=== Movie Comics ===
- Boku no Hatsukoi o Kimi ni Sasagu, Mayu Taneda

=== Video games ===
Year	Title	Role	Notes
2013	Conception II: Children of the Seven Stars	Fuuko	
2013	Seisou no Amazones	Tenshi	
2014	Fantasy × Runners 2	Piyo, Nora, Yuriri	
2014	Pirate's Fantasia	Emilia	
2014	Saga of Ishtaria	Ishutaru	
2014	Schoolgirl Strikers	Mano Rinoda	
2014	Tenku no Craft Fleet	Rukino, Saki, Tifa, Kodia, Josef	
2014	Yokai Hyakkitan!	Demon	
2015	Bravely Archive	Tengu	
2015	Fire Emblem Fates	Azura	
2015	One Way Heroics	Coco	
2015	Robot Girls Z ONLINE	Richter	
2015	The Tower of Princess	Vaglia, Alexia	
2015	Uchi no Hime-sama ga Ichiban Kawaii	Yuki Jūki Shoes Snowman	
2015	Xuccess Heaven	Fuyuka Yamazaki	
2016	Girls' Frontline	HK21, MP7	
2016	Idol Incidents	Mizuki Fudō	
2016	Life Is Strange	Chloe Price, Taylor Christensen	Japanese localization
2016	Overwatch	Mei	Japanese version
2016	Quiz RPG Witch and Black Cat Wiz	Adelaide Schiller	
2016	Yome Collection	Mashiro Munetani, Mashiro Souya	
2016	Yuba no Shirushi	Iru Maharu	
2017	Granblue Fantasy	Justice, Makura	
2017	Fire Emblem Heroes	Azura	
2017	Koekatsu	Tanya Kournikova	
2017	Magia Record	Konoha Shizumi	
2017	Project Tokyo Dolls	Misaki	
2017	World of Warships	Mashiro Souya	
2018	Grand Chase Dimensional Chaser	Ley von Crimson River	
2018	Life Is Strange: Before the Storm	Chloe Price	Japanese localization
2018	Umamusume: Pretty Derby	Maruzensky	
2019	Code Vein	Io	
2019	Devil May Cry 5	Nico	
2019	Seven Deadly Sins:Grand Cross	Skuld	
2020	Azur Lane	Brooklyn, Phoenix, Champagne,Musashi	
2020	Crash Fever	Vicky	
2020	Kandagawa Jet Girls	Jennifer Peach	
2020	Lost Judgment	Emily Mochizuki	
2021	Balan Wonderworld	Emma Cole	
2021	Gate of Nightmares	Emma	
2021	Shin Megami Tensei V	Sahori Itsukishima	
2021	That Time I got Reincarnated as a Slime: Isekai Memories	Luminous Valentine	
2022	Genshin Impact	Columbina	
2022	Eve: Ghost Enemies	Nanase Sawashiro	
2022	The King of Fighters XV	Isla, Re Verse	
2022	Tactics Ogre: Reborn	Catiua Pavel	
2023	Livestream 2: Escape from Togaezuka Happy Place	Himari Aitsuki	
2023	Sword Art Online: Last Recollection	Scheta	
2023	TEVI	Tevi	
2023	World Dai Star: Yume no Stellarium	Daikoku Karasumori	
2023	Ys X: Nordics	Karja Balta	
2024	Cookie Run: Kingdom	Nutmeg Tiger Cookie	Japanese version
2024	Final Fantasy XIV	Endless Sphene/Queen Eternal, Sphene Alexandros XIV, Simulant	Japanese version
2025	Blue Archive	Rio Tsukatsuki	
2025	Wuthering Waves	Iuno	
2026	Monster Strike	Mirai	
2026	Arknights: Endfield	Arcane	Japanese version
2026	Nekopara: Sekai Connect	Ringo	

=== Dubbing ===
Title	Role	Voice dub for	Notes	Ref(s)
Adventure Time	NEPTR	Andy Milonakis	Animation	
Assassination Nation	Lily Colson	Odessa Young		
Bachelorette	Katie Lawrence	Isla Fisher		
Blue Beetle	Jenny Kord	Bruna Marquezine		
Chronicles of the Ghostly Tribe	Cao Weiwei	Tiffany Tang		
Dune: Part Two	Shishakli	Souheila Yacoub		
Helluva Boss	Loona	Erica Lindbeck	Animation	
How to Marry a Millionaire	Pola Debevoise	Marilyn Monroe	New Era Movies edition	
How to Train Your Dragon	Astrid Hofferson	Nico Parker		
Little House on the Prairie	Nellie Oleson Dalton	Alison Arngrim	2019 NHK BS4K edition	
The Nutcracker and the Four Realms	Louise Stahlbaum	Ellie Bamber		
The Originals	Davina Claire	Danielle Campbell		
Ouija	Sarah Morris	Ana Coto		
The Princess	The Princess	Joey King		
Resident Evil				
Shameless	Liam Gallagher	Christian Isaiah	TV series	
Wonka	Young Wonka	Colin O'Brien		
World of Winx	Bloom		Animation	

== Discography ==
Date	Album	Performed by	Songs	Remarks	Year
August 20, 2014	Pitty Patty Survibird	Gesukawa☆Girls	Pitty Patty Survibird; Zen Joshi ka de Extarminating!!	Ending Theme for Sabagebu!	2014
October 1, 2014	Sabagebu! Character Song 2				

== Unit Member ==
Gesukawa☆Girls Momoka Sonokawa (Ayaka Ōhashi), Miou Ootori (Yumi Uchiyama), Urara Kasugano (Rumi Okubo), Maya Kyōdo (Lynn), Kayo Gōtokuji (Nao Tōyama)

SMILE X Natsuki Hoshina (Sarara Yashima), Shizuka Onimaru (Mai Fuchigami), Sachie Kondo (Reina Ueda), Mizuki Fudō (Lynn), Sakurako Īzuka (Yurika Kubo), Ume Momoi (Sayaka Nakaya)
