= Mariko Honda =

Japanese voice actress

- 本多 真梨子
- Born: Kanagawa Prefecture, Japan
- Occupation: Voice actress
- Years active: 2008–present
- Agent: Amuleto

Mariko Honda (本多 真梨子, Honda Mariko) is a Japanese voice actress affiliated with Amuleto. She was previously affiliated with Production Ace.

== Filmography ==
=== Anime ===
Year	Title	Role	Other notes
2008	Our Home's Fox Deity.	Megumi Yano	
2009	Student Council's Discretion	Kurimu Sakurano	Main role
2010	Omamori Himari	Kaya	
2010	Heaven's Lost Property: Forte	Rin Nakai	
2011	Nichijou	Yūko Aioi	Main role
2011	Ring ni Kakero 1: Sekai Taikai-hen	Pandora	
2012	Is This a Zombie? of the Dead	Lilia Lilith	
2012	Upotte!!	Galil	
2013	Fantasista Doll	Mazoon	
2014	Atelier Escha & Logy: Alchemists of the Dusk Sky	Lucille Ernella	
2014	Brynhildr in the Darkness	Kitsuka Hatsuda	
2014	Robot Girls Z	Mazinger Z/Z-chan	Main role
2015	Etotama	Inutan	
2016	Wagamama High Spec	Kaoruko Rokuonji	Main role
2016	Ace Attorney	April May	
2017	Akiba's Trip: The Animation	Suidōbashi	
2017	Kemono Friends	Lion	Ep. 6
2017	Magical Circle Guru Guru	Kuruje	Ep. 17
2018	Crossing Time	Kurobe	
2018	Steins;Gate 0	Katsumi Nakase	
2019	Fire in His Fingertips	Midori Watanabe	Standard version
2020	Tower of God	Yuri Jahad	
2023	Hyakushō Kizoku	Ishii-san	
2026	Rooster Fighter	Elizabeth	

=== Original video animation (OVA) ===
- Nichijou Episode 0 (Yūko Aioi)

=== Video games ===
- Glass Heart Princess (Satsuki Chiga)
- Glass Heart Princess:PLATINUM (Satsuki Chiga)
- Chaos;Child (Momone Takayanagi)
- Steins;Gate 0 (Katsumi Nakase)
- Megadimension Neptunia VII (Uzume Tennouboshi/天王星うずめ)
- Fate/Grand Order (Tlaloc/Tenochtitlan)
- Genkai Tokki: Seven Pirates (Rindo)
- Girls' Frontline (AA-12)
- No Straight Roads (Eve)
- Granblue Fantasy (Former Divine Boar)
- Cyberdimension Neptunia: 4 Goddesses Online (Uzume Tennouboshi)
- DC Super Hero Girls: Teen Power (Lois Lane)
- Arknights (Kazemaru)
- Genshin Impact (Sandrone)
- Anonymous;Code (Iroha Kyogoku)
- Iwakura Aria (Sui Miyauchi)

=== Dubbing ===
- Teenage Mutant Ninja Turtles: Out of the Shadows (Alessandra Ambrosio)
