= Dad Wanted =

2020 Mexican film

- Film poster
- Spanish: Se busca papá
- Directed by: Javier Colinas
- Written by: Victor Avelar; Javier Colinas; Paulette Hernandez; Fernando Barreda Luna
- Starring: Juan Pablo Medina; Ela Velden; Silvia Navarro
- Distributed by: Netflix
- Release date: September 11, 2020
- Running time: 102 minutes
- Country: Mexico
- Language: Spanish

Dad Wanted (Spanish: Se busca papá) is a 2020 Mexican comedy-drama film directed by Javier Colinas, written by Victor Avelar, Javier Colinas, Paulette Hernandez and Fernando Barreda Luna and starring Juan Pablo Medina, Ela Velden and Silvia Navarro.

== Cast ==
- Juan Pablo Medina as Alberto Díaz, a taxi driver and former actor who acts out as Blanca's dad
- Natalia Coronado as Blanca Díaz, a rebellious short-tempered tween girl who practises BMX biking, she often likes rubbing her success in other people's faces
- Ela Velden as Actriz guapa
- Silvia Navarro as Fernanda
- Joaquín Emanuel as Fabián, Blanca's school rival who also does BMX biking
- Luis Ernesto Franco as Santiago Sánchez
- Alberto Guerra as Alberto Guerra
- Patricia Reyes Spíndola as Directora del colegio, Blanca's school principal
- Rodrigo Murray as Hombre con traje
- Gonzalo Garcia Vivanco as Guapo
- Luis Arrieta as Luis Arrieta
- Marisol del Olmo as Mamá Laura
- Victoria Viera as Laura, Blanca's best friend who always has her back
- Roberto Quijano as Sergio
- Lisette Morelos as Recepcionista BMX
- Martha Claudia Moreno as Señora elegante
- Moisés Arizmendi as Moisés Arizmendi

== Plot ==
Blanca is a rebellious tween girl who does BMX biking, her mother disapproves her habit and often forbids her doing it, but she still practices daily behind her mother's back. She is overjoyed when she is handed poster for a BMX racing tournament comes up and the prize is $100,000, but since she's too young, she needs a parent to sign her in, but her mom refuses. Since she does not have a dad, she decides to do a casting to find an actor she can use to play that role to motivate her and to also sign her in without her mom noticing, which is proven to be a difficult task due to her short temper and her mom being very suspicious about it, but she tries her best to overcome those challenges and forget the worrying thoughts of her mother.
