= Snezhnaya (Genshin Impact) =

Video game location

- Genshin Impact location
- Snezhnograd, the nation's capital and largest city
- Created by: miHoYo
- Based on: Russian Empire

In-universe information
- Type: Country
- Ruled by: Anastasya
- Races: Humans; Fae
- Location: Northern portion of Teyvat
- Characters: List
- Element: Cryo
- Ideal: Love (de jure) (Note: Although Snezhnaya's ideal is love, the Tsaritsa rejects it due to it being related to the Heavenly Principles.)
- Sub-region: Nod-Krai

Snezhnaya (Chinese: 至冬; pinyin: Zhì dōng; lit. 'winter') is a fictional nation in the video game Genshin Impact, developed by miHoYo. The region became officially available to players on August 12, 2026, with the release of version 7.0 of the game. Snezhnaya is the eighth region (and the seventh sovereign nation) to be released in Genshin Impact, and it is located in the northern portion of the continent of Teyvat. Snezhnaya is the primary setting for Chapter VII of the game's storyline.

Snezhnaya is primarily based on Russia, specifically the Russian Empire. Critics largely praised Snezhnaya as a significant turning point in the game's narrative, and complimented its worldbuilding and new gameplay systems.

== Design and influences ==
Information about Snezhnaya was first released by miHoYo on April 24, 2026, although its existence had been known since the game's release in 2020. Snezhnaya is the seventh and final nation in Teyvat to be released. (Note: This does not include the autonomous region of Nod-Krai.) Snezhnaya is the home of the antagonistic Fatui, who have been present in the game since its release. Snezhnaya draws inspiration from the Russian Empire and Slavic culture. It gets its name from the Russian word снежная (snezhnaya), which means "snowy". Visually, Snezhnaya took inspiration from Eastern European and sub-Arctic regions. The game's developers also indicated that Snezhnaya is "imbued with Slavic folklore in its setting and classical symphonic music as its musical accompaniment", according to Russian gaming outlet Igromania. The region's soundtrack also consisted of songs in Russian. The London Symphony Orchestra, London Voices choir, and Russian pianist Polina Osetinskaya participated in a live performance of some of the region's music.

The developers had various technical challenges they needed to overcome when designing Snezhnaya. Its complex structures and buildings as well as geometric construction were difficult to achieve. The development team also needed to ensure that the transition between scenes that take place inside a train compared to outside was seamless, as Snezhnaya contains a significant amount of trains. These issues had a high implementation cost. After arriving in Snezhnaya, players can summon a personal train to travel along Snezhnaya's rail lines. This train functions as a mobile hub equipped with a crafting bench, a radio communicator and more.

Snezhnaya introduced several new gameplay mechanics to Genshin Impact, including a third-person shooter (TPS) gun gameplay mode which can be unlocked once players complete a certain part of the story. The TPS mode replaces standard melee combat with a TPS gameplay loop, including elemental reactions and the ability to customize guns. In TPS mode, players can leverage the local environment to their own advantage, such as by shattering the ice on which an enemy is standing so that they will drop into water. Players can also spawn objects made of ice in the area to overcome obstacles, with such objects created in one player's world able to appear in those of others for them to use. A sheer-cold survival mechanic called Kresnik's Torch was introduced using a gauge which keeps the character warm while active. Once the gauge is depleted, the active character loses hit points. A multi-purpose gadget called the Eye of Graeae was introduced to help players navigate through Snezhnaya, as well as assist them with certain environmental mechanics and survival.

== Setting and lore ==
Snezhnaya is located at the far north end of Teyvat, and features big snowscapes and mountain strongholds. Public trains are laid across tracks which are spread throughout Snezhnaya, connecting sparsely-distributed population centers. Its capital city is called Snezhnograd, which contrasts European-style architecture with fairytale-creature NPCs such as beastmen and fae folk. Technologically, Snezhnaya is much more advanced than the other regions on Teyvat with the Fatui being the strongest military force in Teyvat. Snezhnaya is structured as absolute monarchy, ruled by Tsaritsa Anastasya. Snezhnograd is located in a region called Everfrozen Earth, and it serves as the operational hub for the Tsaritsa and the Fatui. Other areas of Snezhnaya include Fellfrost Peak (a giant mountain) and the White Birch Snowgrave (the current mausoleum of the first Cryo Archon).

=== History ===
In ancient times, the people of what became Snezhnaya tried to use the remains of a slain dragon god to create a powerful artificial human, but the experiment failed, turning the region into a frozen wasteland and destroying their civilization by a powerful object called a Celestial Nail, sent by the Heavenly Principles, Teyvat's ruler who lives on the floating island of Celestia. Thousands of years later, a man named Monomakh Snezhnyi emerged from inside the dragon's remains, founded Snezhnaya's first major city, and eventually united the region under his rule as its first emperor. Around 2,000 years prior to the game's events, Monomakh ascended to the position of Cryo Archon and began to pursue a goal of overthrowing the Heavenly Principles. He died in battle five hundred years prior to the game's events and was succeeded by a woman named Anastasya Feodorovna Snezhnaya as the new Cryo Archon and Tsaritsa. Although much of the fae nobility challenged her rule, their political influence gradually declined. The Fatui were established as a group of very powerful individuals charged with enforcing the Tsaritsa's will.

Shortly before the beginning of the game's events, Tsaritsa Anastasya ordered the Fatui to gather the Gnoses (powerful objects associated with the seven elemental Archons) and granted the Harbingers an autonomy to "pursue the meaning of their existence." As a result, the actions done by the Harbingers including Tartaglia and Scaramouche cause the Traveler to be wary of the organization and also had a negative effect on Snezhnaya's relations with Liyue and Inazuma. In the present, the Fatui's campaign to gather the Gnoses brought the Traveler to Snezhnaya. By this time, Anastasya had also launched Project Stuzha, a policy with the goal of reducing energy consumption nationwide so that resources can be devoted to research.

=== Plot ===
The protagonist Traveler and their guide Paimon arrive in Snezhnaya, but are separated by a storm before reuniting with the Eye of Graeae's help. After Paimon mysteriously falls ill, they travel to the town of Sretomorozsk, where they meet Alyosha, a local hunter. Together, they uncover the corruption surrounding the distribution of Kresnik Kristall, an ore used for heating. This prompts Alyosha to join the Traveler and Paimon on their journey to Snezhnograd. There, the Traveler encounters Fatui Harbingers Sandrone and Tartaglia and learns about Project Stuzha. After meeting Mitya, an energy researcher, the Traveler discovers that the Fatui are seeking new energy sources and joins the Rokot, a secret group opposed to the project. A supernatural disaster later traps the Traveler and their companions inside a theater during a snowstorm. As people mysteriously die and the Traveler experiences strange visions, they discover that some of those present are already dead. The investigation eventually leads them to Ronova, the godlike Ruler of Death. After escaping her, the Traveler learns that Fatui director Pierro has taken Paimon to the research headquarters. Ronova appears again and reveals that a Curse of Death will activate if the research threatens Celestia. Pierro then reveals that the Tsaritsa's ultimate goal is to challenge the Heavenly Principles themselves as well as that Paimon was created by Celestia, and announces the project to be temporary suspended.

With Tartaglia's assistance, the Traveler secures an audience with Anastasya, who explains that she collects Gnoses to fight against the Heavenly Principles and prevent destruction of Snezhnaya, which would be caused by the Celestial Nail. The Traveler joins forces with the Fatui to defeat Ronova, who had been exploiting loopholes alongside Rhinedottir, a powerful witch and the Ruler of Life. The group uses Seals of Life, magical items made using Rhinedottir's power, against Ronova, luring out Rhinedottir in the process. This allows Anastasya to negotiate a meeting regarding Asmoday, the missing Ruler of Space. When Anastasya and Rhinedottir reconvene, the former secretly manipulates time and space around Rhinedottir with her obtained Gnoses to prevent her from completing a ritual, causing Celestia to strip Ronova of her authority for earlier abuses of power. Taking advantage of Ronova's weakened state, Pierro severely injures her, allowing Project Stuzha to resume afterward. After escaping and before seemingly dying, Ronova damages a Celestial Nail, a pillar that destroyed civilizations, using a rudiment called Eitr, triggering reactions across the various Celestial Nails stationed around Teyvat and contaminating the surrounding lands with Holy Soil, a process known as the Hallowing which threatens to revert Teyvat back to its original Light Realm state. The Tsaritsa was also shown to have engaged in a strategic game of chess against Rhinedottir, but no other information about this has yet been released.

In response to the Holy Soil phenomenon, Anastasya consults Hexenzirkel mage Alice to help; she reveals that the Archons must undergo "Trials of Usurpation" to slow the spread of the Hallowing. Anastasya subsequently convenes a summit with the other nations' leaders to coordinate their efforts. Meanwhile, an investigation led by Hyperborean survivor Noy reveals that the Hallowing has resurfaced remains of ancient fae among afflicted soldiers, prompting Anastasya to undertake her own Trial of Usurpation and reclaim her long-disavowed authority of Love. Following the completion of the Trials with the Traveler accompanying two of them, Anastasya, the Traveler and representatives of the other nations are summoned to a data center in Celestia, where they learn that the Heavenly Principles intend to reset Teyvat. The leaders are ordered to send the Heavenly Principles an allogene (Vision holder) to be preserved as their civilizations' final record (whose disembodied consciousnesses would be used as data to guide the course of fate) or risk annihilation in forty-two days. Refusing to accept this, Anastasya and the others decide to put up a resistance against the Heavenly Principles.

== Promotion and release ==
A promotional video was released for Snezhnaya on June 26, 2026, which introduced its characters; within a day, the video had garnered over six million views on Bilibili. Snezhnaya was released in version 7.0 of the game on August 12, 2026, along with the first part of the region's main storyline. A new elemental reaction type, Stellar Swirl, was also released then, (Note: An elemental raction type, Stellar-Conduct, was released in "Luna VIII" with the release of Sandrone.) as well as the ability to trade certain items between players.

Generally, in terms of gameplay, players typically arrive in Snezhnaya by following the Archon Quest storyline. However, because the game features an open-world design, after completing the requisite Archon Quest players can unlock a Teleport Waypoint in Snezhnaya, allowing players to start the Snezhnaya Archon Quest early.

== Reception and analysis ==
Critics and analysts have characterized Snezhnaya as a major turning point in Genshin Impact's overarching narrative. Qian Hongyan of Chinese gaming outlet Jinghe wrote that Snezhnaya is presented as the key setting for answering fundamental questions about the game such as the Tsaritsa's motives and the fight against Celestia, with Snezhnaya marking the point where the Tsaritsa's plan to fight Celestia comes into force. Qian also wrote that on the chessboard between the Tsaritsa and Rhinedottir, only two Gnoses (Cryo and Geo) remain upright; lore enthusiasts indicated that the arrangement of the chess pieces mirrors a famous 1922 chess match between Alexander Alekhine and Fred Yates. More broadly, Snezhnaya serves as a convergence point for plotlines and mysteries that have existed since the release of Mondstadt, the game's first region, while functioning as a structural transition rather than the game's conclusion. Yang Yeong-seok from Inven argued that unlike previous regions whose introductions felt like exploratory adventures, Snezhnaya is framed as entering enemy territory from the start. Yang characterized the tone of the story as serious and heavy. Jenni Lada of Siliconera wrote that miHoYo was "making good on" a promise they had made to inform players about Snezhnaya, indicating that "we got a better idea" about the Fatui as an organization, as well as about Paimon. At the time of Lada's article, only the first two acts of the Snezhnaya Archon Quest had been released, with more to come later. She speculated that there would likely be more plot reveals in the future. A writer for Meduza compared Alyosha to the late Russian political candidate Alexei Navalny, writing that the character's name and storyline evoked Navalny.

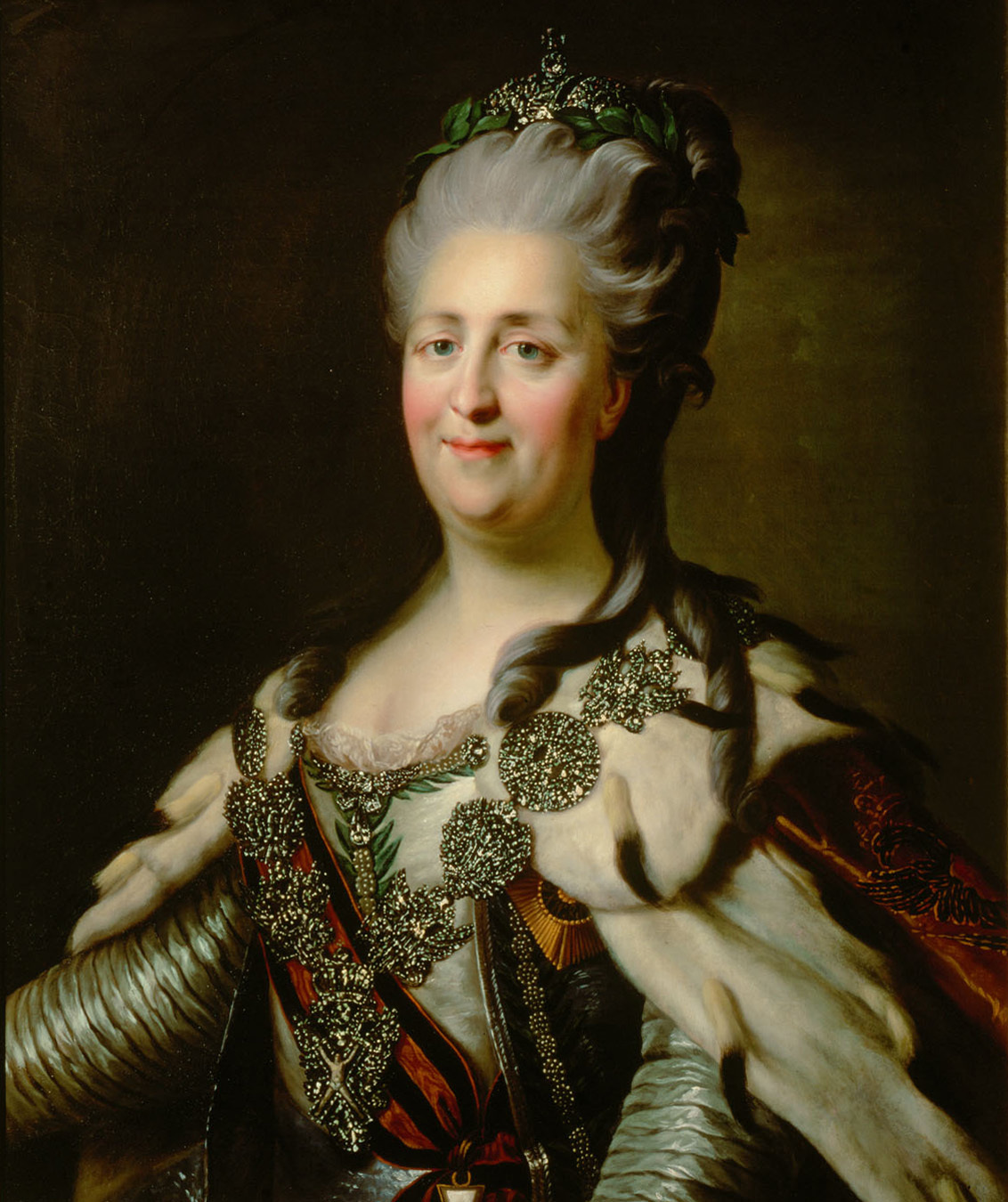
Anastasya, the Tsaritsa of Snezhnaya, was compared to Catherine the Great, who was Empress of Russia from 1762 to 1796.

Snezhnaya's introduction have been praised for combining an elegant and cold visual style with a broader depiction of the region's culture and society. Qian praised the promotional video for introducing nine new characters and argued that the inclusion of non-Fatui characters gives the region greater depth and contrast. They particularly compared the Tsaritsa to Catherine the Great, with her characterization as an expansionist ruler seeking to reshape and remold Teyvat and collect the Gnoses being compared to the Russian empress' territorial expansion and authoritarian style of ruling. Qian argued that, like Catherine, the Tsaritsa is intended to be a complex and legendary figure, reflecting players' expectations for her. Snezhnaya's use of Slavic folklore, including in its characters, resonated with international audiences, particularly Russian players who appreciated the cultural references. Xiong Mo of Game Teahouse said that Snezhnaya deliberately avoids typical post-apocalyptic frozen wasteland tropes, and that it instead shows a technologically advanced and energetic civilization. Snezhnaya, they wrote, is shaped by ancient forces and industry, particularly steel. Some players believed that the atmosphere in Snezhnaya was too different from those in other regions of the game. The region's imagery and worldbuilding have also incorporated references to contemporary culture, including what reporters from GameSpot and Polygon argued was an allusion to U.S. President Donald Trump's 2026 renovation of the Lincoln Memorial Reflecting Pool in Washington, D.C.

Snezhnaya has also been presented as a showcase for the game's evolving technical and environmental design. Xiong argues that the train imagery seen throughout Snezhnaya serves a dual purpose as both a symbol of Snezhnaya's industrial power and as a multifunctional human hub. A writer from Gamersky agreed with regards to the train being a mobile hub, adding that its presence enhances players' immersion while using it to travel. Artem Weiss of Russian site Igromania said that trains reflect Snezhnayan culture and represent a form of transportation that had yet to be introduced to the game. Lada wrote that the fact that the Traveler uses a train for safe passage around Snezhnaya indicated the dangerousness of the terrain. Yang argued that Snezhnaya acts as a critical turning point for miHoYo to demonstrate Genshin Impact's evolving quality, technical improvements and narrative depth amidst competition in the video game market.

Snezhnaya's gameplay has been received well. Jessica Orr of Eurogamer compared Snezhnaya's TPS gameplay levels to Gears of War, while GAME Watch and Dengeki Online drew comparisons to Death Stranding and Dark Souls for its systems that enable players to leave useful terrain modifications and messages for others. Game*Spark concurred, praising the ability to toggle this feature off for players who prefer solitary exploration. The TPS mode was described by Famitsu writer QMine as a fully-developed shooting system with cover, sliding, custom firearm loadouts and elemental synergy; this showed miHoYo's ambition according to QMine. QMine and a writer from Gamersky both wrote that integrating elemental reactions into firearm combat creates a seamless bridge between Genshin Impact's battle system and traditional third-person shooter gameplay. One writer believed that although TPS gameplay itself was not a new concept, it was surprising that Genshin Impact gave it a high standard of production when there were already a lot of other gameplay modes. They said that this was the result of careful consideration and long-term planning on the part of the production team. QMine also compared Snezhnaya to Dragonspine, a region in Mondstadt. They praised the fact that unlike in Dragonspine, Snezhnaya's character temperature measurement system rarely interrupts the flow of gameplay. Because heat sources are scattered abundantly across the map, energy replenishment happens naturally without players needing to adjust their routes.
