= Arlecchino (Genshin Impact) =

Fictional character in a video game

- Genshin Impact character
- Promotional artwork for Arlecchino
- First game: Genshin Impact (2023)
- Voiced by: EN: Erin Yvette; ZH: Huang Ying; JA: Nanako Mori; KO: Lee Myung-hee

In-universe information
- Aliases: The Knave, "Father"
- Weapon: Polearm
- Home: Fontaine
- Element: Pyro

Arlecchino, (Note: /ˌɑːrləˈkiːnoʊ/ AR-lə-KEE-noh; Chinese: 阿蕾奇諾; pinyin: Ālěiqínuò) real name Peruere Snezhevna, (Note: Chinese: 佩露薇利·雪奈茨芙娜; pinyin: Pèilùwēilì Xuěnàicífúnà) is a fictional character from the video game Genshin Impact developed by miHoYo. The character first appeared in version 4.1 of the game in 2023 and became playable in 2024. She is a member of the Fatui, the diplomatic organization of the fictional nation of Snezhnaya and one of the game's primary antagonistic factions. Within the Fatui, she holds the fourth seat among the Eleven Fatui Harbingers, under the codename The Knave. (Note: Chinese: 仆人; pinyin: Púrén; lit. 'servant') She is also the head of the House of the Hearth, an orphanage and intelligence agency where she is regarded by the children as their "Father".

Arlecchino's name is Italian for Harlequin, a stock character from commedia dell'arte. In terms of characterization, she is portrayed as an anti-hero, embodying both righteous and villainous traits. Before her release as a playable character, Arlecchino had become a fan favorite for her charisma and complexity, and she was praised by critics for her visual design and characterization.

== Design and voice acting ==
Arlecchino's name derives from the Italian term arlecchino, 'harlequin', a stock character from commedia dell'arte. Her birth name, Peruere, means "to burn away" in Latin. In Japanese, Arlecchino is voiced by Nanako Mori. Mori explained that when she first received Arlecchino's character profile, she reflected on how to portray such a morally ambiguous figure. Although a member of the antagonistic Fatui, Arlecchino is not driven by malice, and her relationship with the protagonists, while distant, is not hostile. In terms of tone and delivery, Mori said that the developers wanted Arlecchino to convey an image "cooler than a man", leading her to use a strong and charismatic voice. Arlecchino is voiced by Huang Ying in Chinese, Erin Yvette in English, and Lee Myung-hee in Korean.

== Appearances ==
Arlecchino's real name is Peruere Snezhevna. An orphan from the ancient Crimson Moon Dynasty, she was adopted by the previous bearer of the "Knave" codename, Crucabena. Crucabena ruled the House of the Hearth with cruelty, seeking to determine her successor through a deadly battle royale. Peruere and Crucabena's own daughter, Clervie, resisted her tyranny but repeatedly failed. At sixteen, unable to fight or escape, Clervie chose to die at Peruere's hands. One year later, Peruere, hardened by suffering and newly granted a Vision, finally killed Crucabena. She then entered the service of the Tsaritsa of Snezhnaya as the new Knave, and was bestowed the name "Arlecchino". Taking control of the House of the Hearth, she abandoned the title of "Mother" used by her predecessor, instead declaring herself "Father". Under her leadership, the children came to trust and respect her, and gained the freedom to choose their own futures.

Arlecchino is the master of the Fatui's intelligence agency in Fontaine, the House of the Hearth. Rather than a wholly villainous figure, she is portrayed as an antihero. Although cold and ruthless, she cares deeply for the children of the House of the Hearth, serving as their steadfast protector and "Father". She is known to sympathize with the death of her colleague "La Signora", and despises and distrusts her fellow Fatui Harbinger "Il Dottore" for his obsession with human experimentation, wishing she could kill him. Despite her high standing among the children, her reputation among fellow Fatui Harbingers is poor, with Tartaglia and the Wanderer calling her crazy and insane.

The House of the Hearth is both an orphanage and an intelligence agency. Arlecchino adopts orphans from across Teyvat, training them as Fatui operatives tasked with combat missions or espionage. Children raised there take new surnames: males as "Snezhnevich" and females as "Snezhevna", meaning "son/daughter of snow".

=== Gameplay ===
Arlecchino is a five-star Pyro user who wields a long-handled scythe in combat and shes classified as a polearm character. Her signature weapons name is called the "Crimson Moon's Semblance" and increases her CRIT Rate. Arlecchino's combat skills involve using a mechanic known as the Bond of Life, which hinders healing in exchange for increasing attack damage. Arlecchino gains Bond of Life by using her Elemental Skill "All Is Ash". Her Elemental Burst "Balemoon Rising" can undo this and restore her health. Her main gameplay is centralized on fast, high damage slashes to quickly kill enemies, using her Elemental Skill to increase damage output. The recommended artifact set to use is "Fragment of Harmonic Whimsy". Arlecchino also appears as a weekly boss.

== Promotion ==
Arlecchino first appeared in the teaser "A Winter Night's Lazzo" for the Sumeru chapter of the game's main storyline. In the game, Arlecchino makes her debut in the Fontaine chapter, first appearing as a non-playable character. Prior to her appearance, three children from the House of the Hearth were introduced as playable characters in version 4.0, where their identities as agents were revealed in the main story. miHoYo also released Harbinger-style artwork cards for the three, highlighting their affiliation with the House of the Hearth, which also included commentary from Arlecchino. On March 11, 2024, miHoYo published Arlecchino's own artwork card.

Before miHoYo released Arlecchino as a playable character, she had already gained popularity among players as a charismatic antagonist. Even though she did not appear in the game until the Fontaine chapter, a Reddit community dedicated to discussing Arlecchino had accumulated 26,000 members within two years. Some players expressed their fondness for the character through cosplay. On April 17, 2024, miHoYo released "Song of the Embers", the first fully hand-drawn (rather than Live2D) animated short for Genshin Impact, which depicts Arlecchino's backstory prior to becoming a Fatui Harbinger. On April 18, her character teaser "As the Curtain Falls" was released, followed by a combat demonstration trailer, "Cradle Song", on April 23. Arlecchino became a playable character in version 4.6, and miHoYo also created her signature weapon, "Crimson Moon's Semblance". Alongside her release as a playable character, she was also added as a boss that players could fight weekly.

Marco Wutz of Sports Illustrated, Gray Pigeon of Game Grapes and Matsushiro Katamura of Japanese site Real Sound all praised the "Song of the Embers" animated short, considering its seven-minute runtime nonetheless full of audiovisual tension, and arguing that it demonstrates miHoYo's "comprehensive strengths beyond game production." Gray Piegon said that the song in "Song of the Embers" differed from the Fatui's traditionally sorrowful and somber musical themes, instead featuring gentle vocals to emphasize Arlecchino's struggle to break free from her cage and resist fate; at the climax, the blend of solo female vocals and a children's choir symbolized her moment of enlightenment in overcoming said fate. He also praised the soundtrack for Arlecchino's boss battle, describing it as the first time Genshin Impact employed the use of electronic dance music (EDM) as the core of its composition rather than relying on orchestral music as the foundation with EDM as embellishment. Bruno Yonezawa of Screen Rant praised the decision to add Arlecchino as a boss, writing that the game had not had a boss that took humanoid form in combat since the Raiden Shogun's boss fight in version 2.5. He wrote that fighting opponents who are roughly the same size as the player gives a sense of equality in battle.

== Critical reception ==
Josh Broadwell of VG247 compared Arlecchino to Kafka from another miHoYo game, Honkai: Star Rail, as well as Fagin from Oliver Twist. He suggested that although Arlecchino's actions mark her as ruthless and corrupt, traces of compassion beneath her villainy make it difficult to judge her character. Gray Pigeon, an editor on Chinese gaming site Game Grapes, remarked on miHoYo's approach to Arlecchino's characterization, saying that production constraints forced the company to frontload her development. Even so, miHoYo experimented with new narrative techniques, which he described as another "iteration" of the studio's storytelling ability.

The staff of Japanese gaming website Inside Games described her as a "cool villain" archetype, stating that alongside her black and white hair, distinctive eyes, and a somewhat androgynous face, Nanako Mori's portrayal of the character became addictive and helped her gain popularity as an "overly handsome female executive". They further praised how she was portrayed as strict and adhering to the rules of the House, but at the same time willing to utilize the player's character to circumvent them. Analysis was also given to how her character as "Father" serves as a contrast to the previous "Mother" figure of the House, and her caring acted as a testament to her role as a parental figure as her story arc examines what family means. Lastly they felt her scythe was a fitting weapon for her character, and enjoyed the character's nuances such as incorporating red X's into her cooking, her inability to comprehend buzzwords, and her poor attempts at telling jokes. Despite this, they noted there was still a brutal atmosphere around the character, even when made playable.

Yahoo News writer Yan Ku stated that while she and other players of the game enjoyed Arlecchino's "elegant character design", prior to the character's playable release, she felt Arlecchino was portrayed as a cruel authoritarian who happened to be soft underneath. In this context, she felt that this posed a challenge to the developers on how to write her joining forces with the player, but after playing her storyline, considered her to be one of the best-written characters in the game. In particular, she emphasized that while the character had superhuman abilities, she was shown to have very human struggles. Ku pointed out that while the game's narrative initially reinforces the preconception of Arlecchino as an authoritarian villain continuing a cycle of abuse, later story elements presented her as instead as a flawed person, trying to change a morally questionable organization from the inside. She additionally enjoyed the exploration of her past identity of Peruere, describing it as "one of the most poignant sequences in the entire game". Regarding her gameplay, Ku stated in a later article that Arlecchino is a powerful unit who performs exceptionally well in combat.
