= Polina Osetinskaya =

Russian pianist

- Полина Осетинская
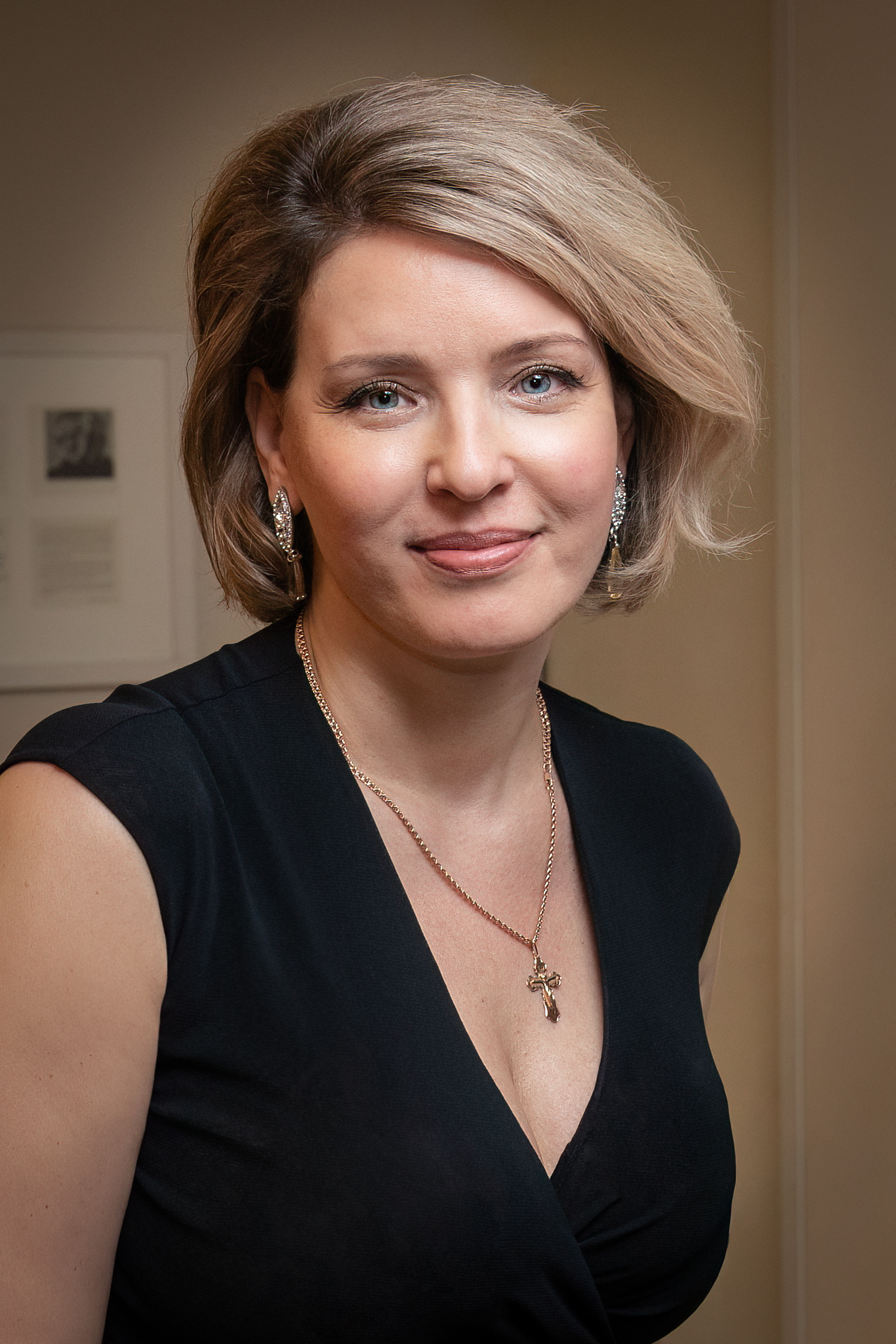
- Toronto, June 2023
- Born: 11 December 1975 (age 50); Moscow, Russian SFSR, Soviet Union
- Occupation: Pianist

Polina Olegovna Osetinskaya (Russian: Полина Олеговна Осетинская; 11 December 1975) is a Russian pianist.

== Biography ==
Osetinskaya was born in Moscow on 11 December 1975 to cinematographer Oleg Osetinsky (1937–2020). She began playing the piano at the age of five. She performed on stage for the first time at the age of six. In 1982, she entered the Central Music School at the Moscow Conservatory. In the winter of 1983, she gave her first solo concert in Moscow. At the age of eight, in Vilnius, she performed Johann Sebastian Bach's Concerto in D minor with the Lithuanian Chamber Orchestra conducted by Saulius Sondeckis. In 1987, when Osetinskaya was eleven years old, she made her debut in the Great Hall of the Moscow Conservatory, where she played Mozart's Concerto No. 23 in A major with the Chamber Orchestra conducted by Georgy Vetvitsky. Osetinskaya continued her musical education at a lyceum school in St. Petersburg, where Marina Wolf was her teacher. In 1998 she graduated from the Saint Petersburg Conservatory as an external student. In 2000, she completed an assistantship-internship at the Moscow Conservatory with Professor Vera Gornostayeva.

== Concert activity ==
Osetinskaya gives tour concerts in Russia and abroad. She also gives solo concerts, as well as with leading Russian and foreign orchestras. She likes to play in an ensemble, participates in various musical projects together with other musicians. Presents non-standard programs to the public, which, along with classical works, often includes works by modern post-avant-garde composers: Silvestrov, Desyatnikov, Pärt, Martynov, Karmanov, Pelecis and others.

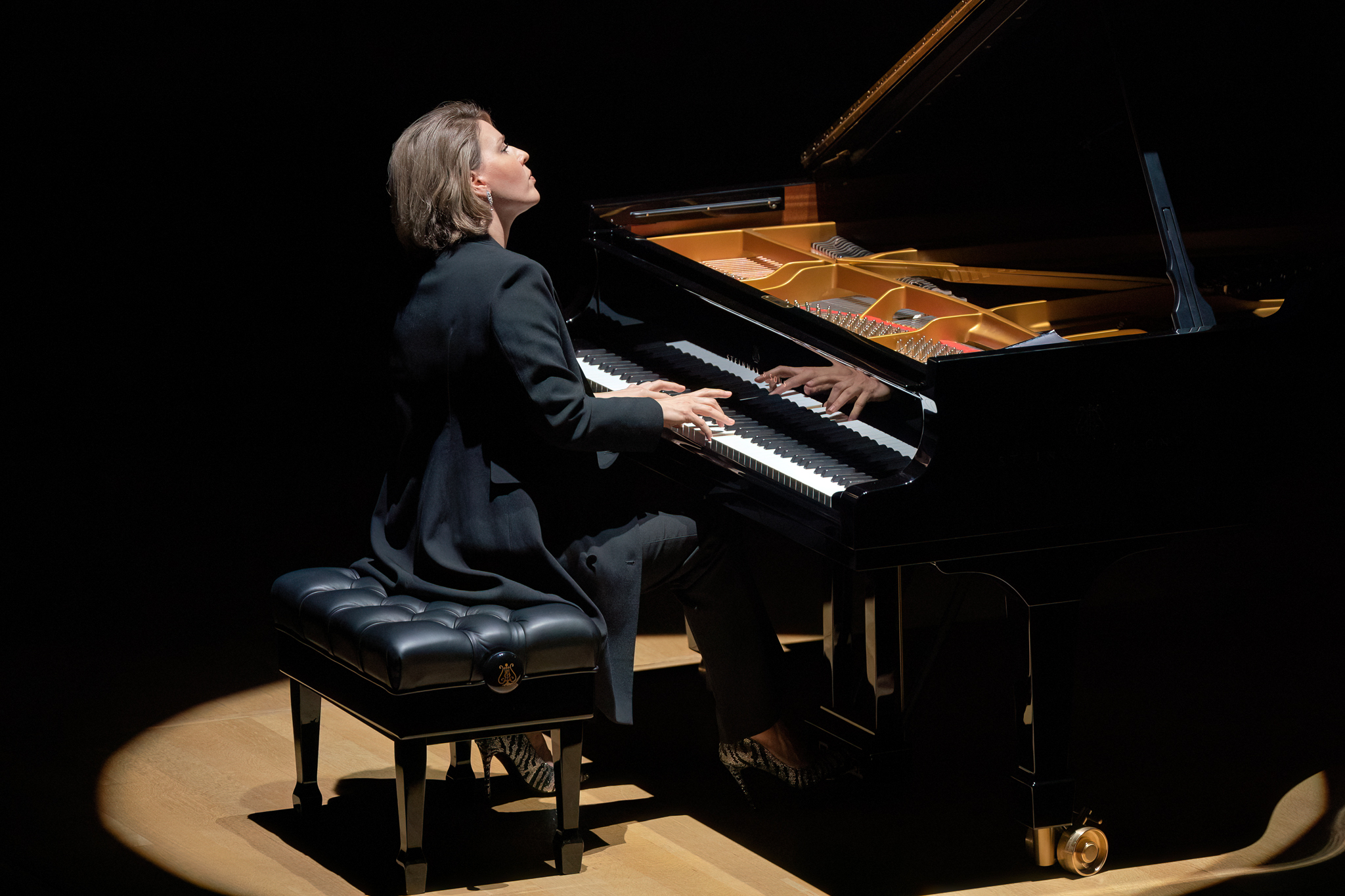
Pianist Polina Osetinskaya performing at Koerner Hall

Osetinskaya has taken part in many prestigious music festivals: Du Wallonie (Brussels), Mainly Mozart Festival (San Diego, California), "December Evenings" (Moscow), "Crescendo", "Stars on Baikal" (Irkutsk), the Diaghilev Festival (Perm), "Faces of Modern Pianoism" and "Stars of the White Nights" (St. Petersburg).

At the Diaghilev Festival and other stage venues, Osetinskaya presented several interesting musical projects with different musicians such as violinist Maxim Vengerov, pianist Alexei Goribol, composer and pianist Anton Batagov, and actress Kseniya Rappoport. Osetinskaya has performed with such conductors as Tugan Sokhiev, Alexander Sladkovsky, Vasily Sinaisky, Teodor Currentzis, Saulius Sondetskis, Thomas Sanderling, and Dmitry Sitkovetsky. The pianist's recordings have been released on many labels – Sony Music, Naxos, Bel Air, Quartz, etc.

== Social activities ==
Osetinskaya created and headed the "Polina Osetinskaya Professional Health Support Center for Musicians", which helps musicians and people of creative professions in solving problems related to the peculiarities of the profession, such as overplayed hands, muscle cramps, fear of going on stage, vegetative stress and many others.

Osetinskaya is engaged in charitable activities. She is a trustee of the Oxygen Foundation, which helps patients with cystic fibrosis. Osetinskaya opposed the Russian invasion of Ukraine. In 2022, she and other Russian artists signed a letter against the invasion. After that, she has faced cancellation of her concerts in all state and government concert halls in Russia.

== Personal life ==
Osetinskaya has been divorced twice and has two children.

In 2006, Osetinskaya married journalist Igor Poroshin. Their children are Alexandra (born 2008) and Anton (born 2011), in addition, she raised Anastasia (born 2003), her husband's daughter from her first marriage. Osetinskaya and Poroshin divorced in 2016.

== Bibliography ==
Osetinskaya wrote her autobiographical book Farewell to Sadness, which became a bestseller. In the book, the author talks about the unusual circumstances of her childhood, as well as her difficult development as a musician.
